= Robert Adam =

British neoclassical architect (1728–1792)

Robert Adam FRSE FRS FSAScot FSA FRSA
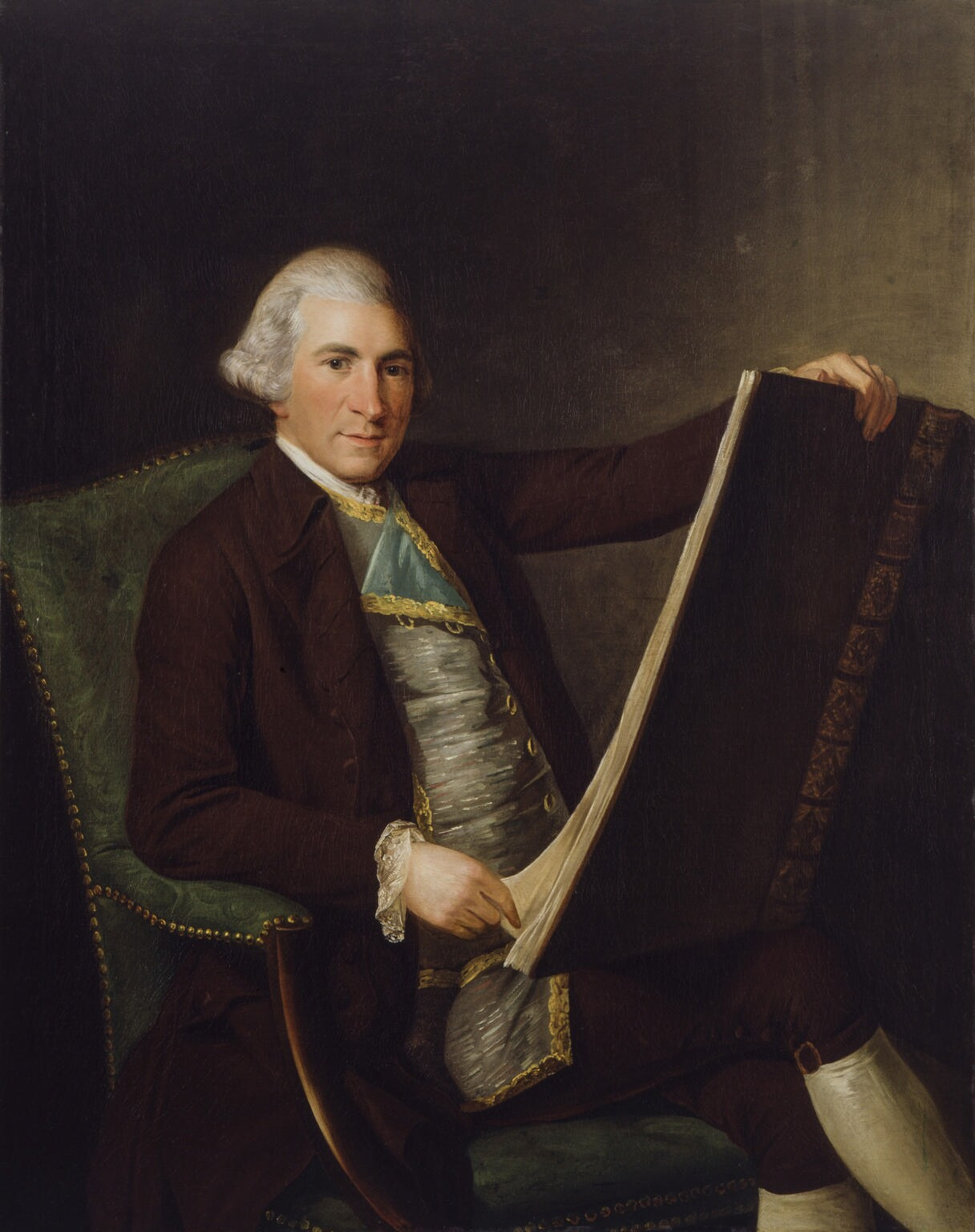
- Portrait attributed to George Willison, c. 1770–1775
- Born: 3 July 1728; Kirkcaldy, Fife, Scotland
- Died: 3 March 1792 (aged 63); London, England
- Burial place: Westminster Abbey
- Education: University of Edinburgh
- Style: Neoclassical
- Parents: William Adam (father); Mary Robertson (mother)
- Relatives: John Adam (brother); James Adam (brother)
- Occupation: Architect
- Practice: Adam Brothers (Edinburgh, London)
- Buildings: Syon House; Culzean Castle; Kedleston Hall; Pulteney Bridge; Harewood House; Charlotte Square

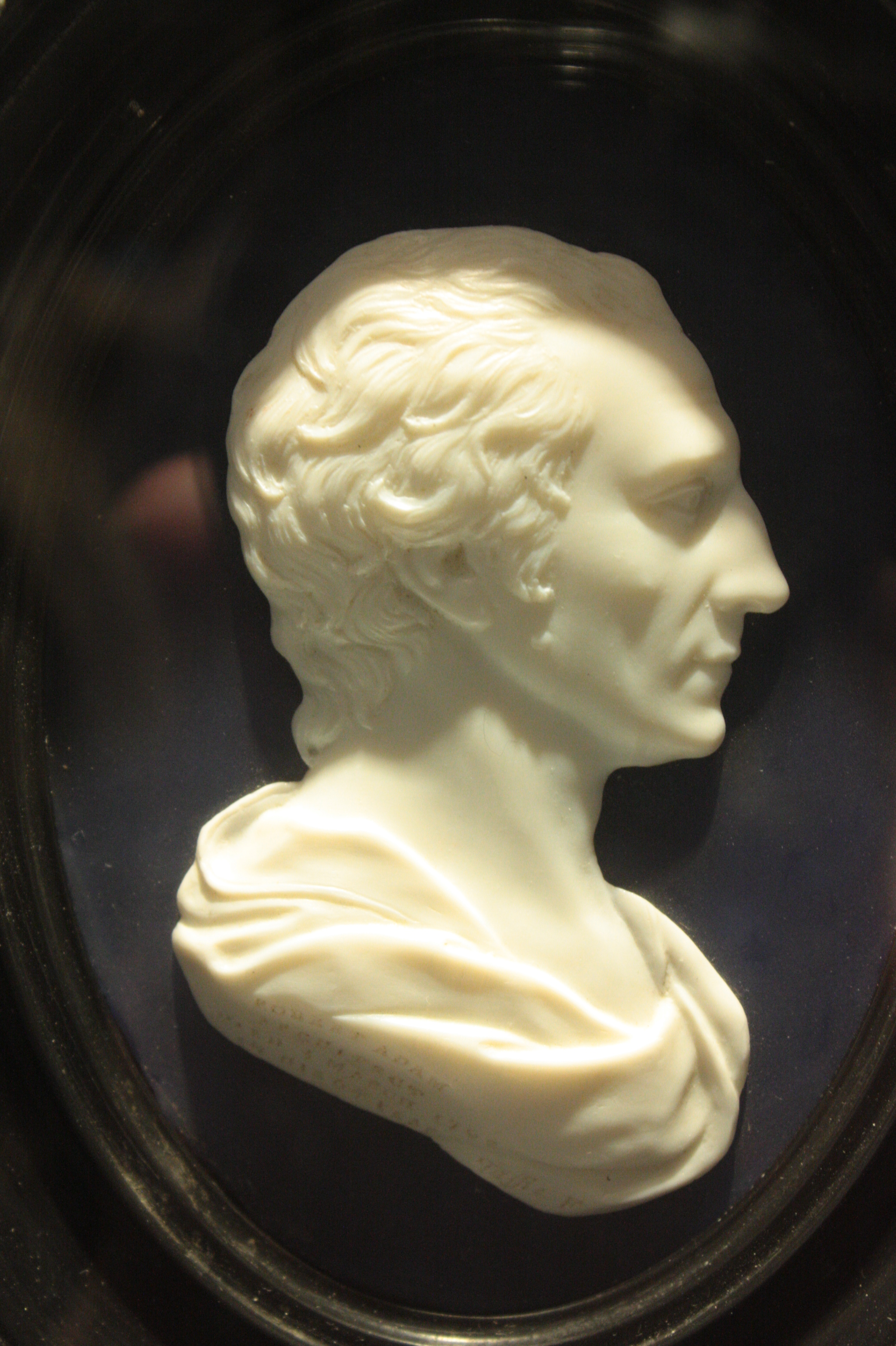
Robert Adam by James Tassie (medallion)

Robert Adam (3 July 1728 – 3 March 1792) was a Scottish neoclassical architect, interior designer and furniture designer. He was the son of William Adam (1689–1748), Scotland's foremost architect of the time, and trained under him. With his older brother John, Robert took on the family business, which included lucrative work for the Board of Ordnance, after William's death.

In 1754, he left for Rome, spending nearly five years on the continent studying architecture under Charles-Louis Clérisseau and Giovanni Battista Piranesi. On his return to Britain he established a practice in London, where he was joined by his younger brother James. Here he developed the "Adam Style", and his theory of "movement" in architecture, based on his studies of antiquity, and became one of the most successful and fashionable architects in the country. Adam held the post of Architect of the King's Works from 1761 to 1769.

Robert Adam was a leader of the first phase of the classical revival in England and Scotland from around 1760 until his death. He influenced the development of Western architecture, both in Europe and in North America. Adam designed interiors and fittings as well as houses. Much of his work consisted of remodelling existing houses, as well as contributions to Edinburgh's townscape and designing romantic pseudo-mediaeval country houses in Scotland.

He served as the member of Parliament for Kinross-shire from 1768 to 1774.

== Biography ==
=== Early life ===
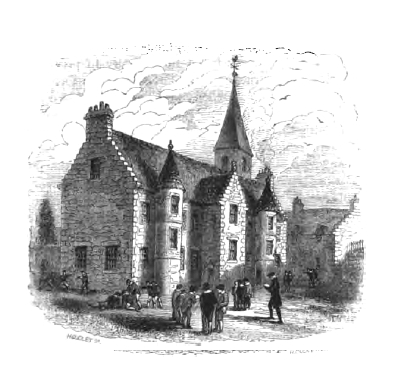
Royal High School (1578–1777) on site of Blackfriars Monastery, Edinburgh.

Adam was born on 3 July 1728 at Gladney House in Kirkcaldy, Fife, the second son of Mary Robertson (1699–1761), the daughter of William Robertson of Gladney, and architect William Adam. As a child he was noted as having a "feeble constitution". From 1734 at the age of six Adam attended the Royal High School, Edinburgh where he learned Latin (from the second year lessons were conducted in Latin) until he was 15. He was taught to read works by Virgil, Horace, Sallust and parts of Cicero and in his final year Livy.

In autumn 1743, he matriculated at the University of Edinburgh, and compulsory classes for all students were: the Greek language, logic, metaphysics and natural philosophy. Students could choose three elective subjects, Adam attended classes in mathematics, taught by Colin Maclaurin, and anatomy, taught by Alexander Monro primus. His studies were interrupted by the arrival of Bonnie Prince Charlie and his Highlanders, who occupied Edinburgh during the Jacobite rising of 1745. At the end of the year, Robert fell seriously ill for some months, and it seems unlikely that he returned to university, having completed only two years of study.

On his recovery from illness in 1746, he joined his elder brother John as apprentice to his father. He assisted William Adam on projects such as the building of Inveraray Castle and the continuing extensions of Hopetoun House. William's position as Master Mason to the Board of Ordnance also began to generate much work, as the Highlands were fortified following the failed Jacobite revolt. Robert's early ambition was to be an artist rather than architect, and the style of his early sketches in the manner of Salvator Rosa is reflected in his earliest surviving architectural drawings, which show picturesque gothic follies. William Adam died in June 1748, and left Dowhill, a part of the Blair Adam estate which included Dowhill Castle, to Robert. From his father, Robert inherited an extensive library and extended it.

=== Architectural practice in Edinburgh ===
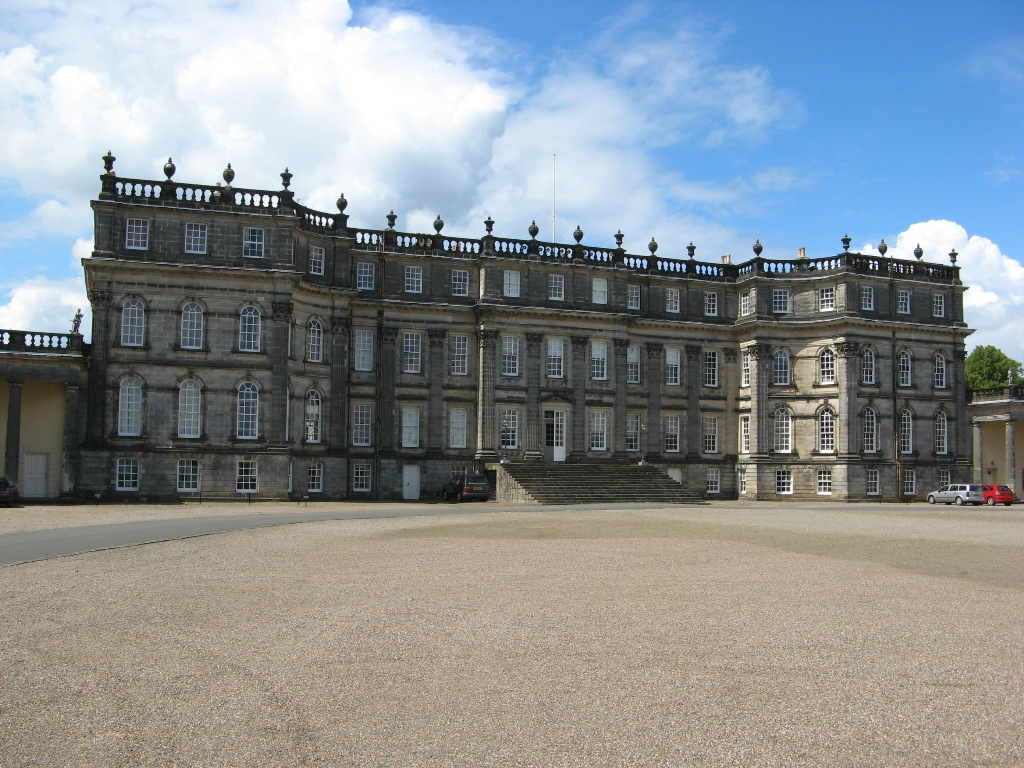
Entrance front of Hopetoun House, designed by William Adam and modified by the Adam Brothers

On William Adam's death, John Adam inherited both the family business and the position of Master Mason to the Board of Ordnance. He immediately took Robert into partnership, later to be joined by James Adam. The Adam Brothers' first major commission was the decoration of the grand state apartments on the first floor at Hopetoun House, followed by their first "new build" at Dumfries House. For the Board of Ordnance, the brothers were the main contractor at Fort George, a large modern fort near Inverness designed by military engineer Colonel William Skinner. Visits to this project, begun in 1750, would occupy the brothers every summer for the next 10 years, and, along with works at many other barracks and forts, provided Robert with a solid foundation in practical building.

In the winter of 1749–1750, Adam travelled to London with his friend, the poet John Home. He took the opportunity for architectural study, visiting Wilton, designed by Inigo Jones, and the Queens Hermitage in Richmond by Roger Morris. His sketchbook of the trip also shows a continuing interest in Gothic architecture.

Among his friends at Edinburgh were the philosophers Adam Ferguson and David Hume and the artist Paul Sandby whom he met in the Highlands. Other Edinburgh acquaintances included Gilbert Elliot, William Wilkie, John Home and Alexander Wedderburn.

Initiated, 29 Nov 1752, Masonic Lodge Canongate Kilwinning, No. 2 (SC), Edinburgh, together with his younger brother James Adam.

=== Grand Tour ===
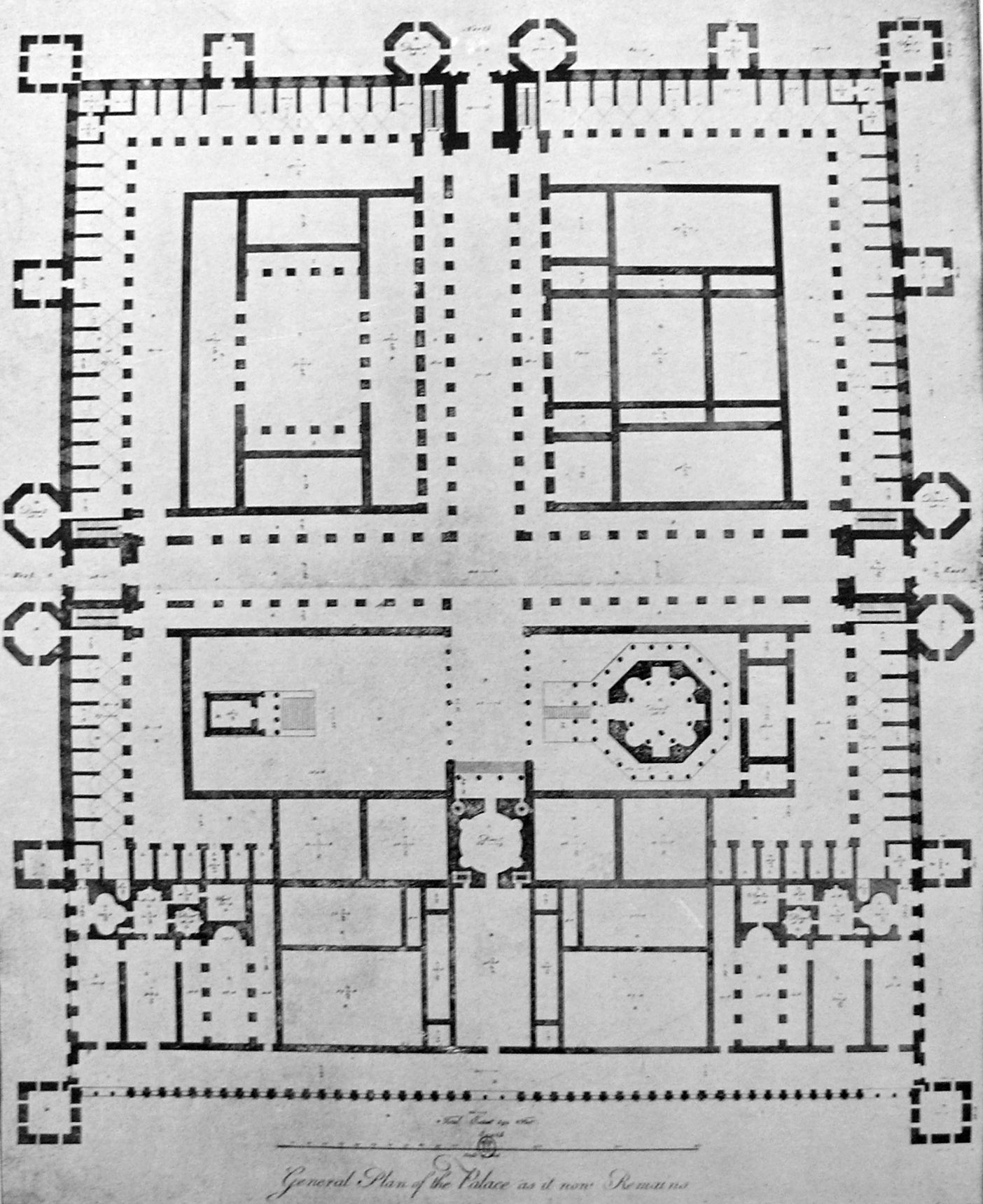
Plan of the Diocletian palace in Split, Croatia. R. Adam 1764

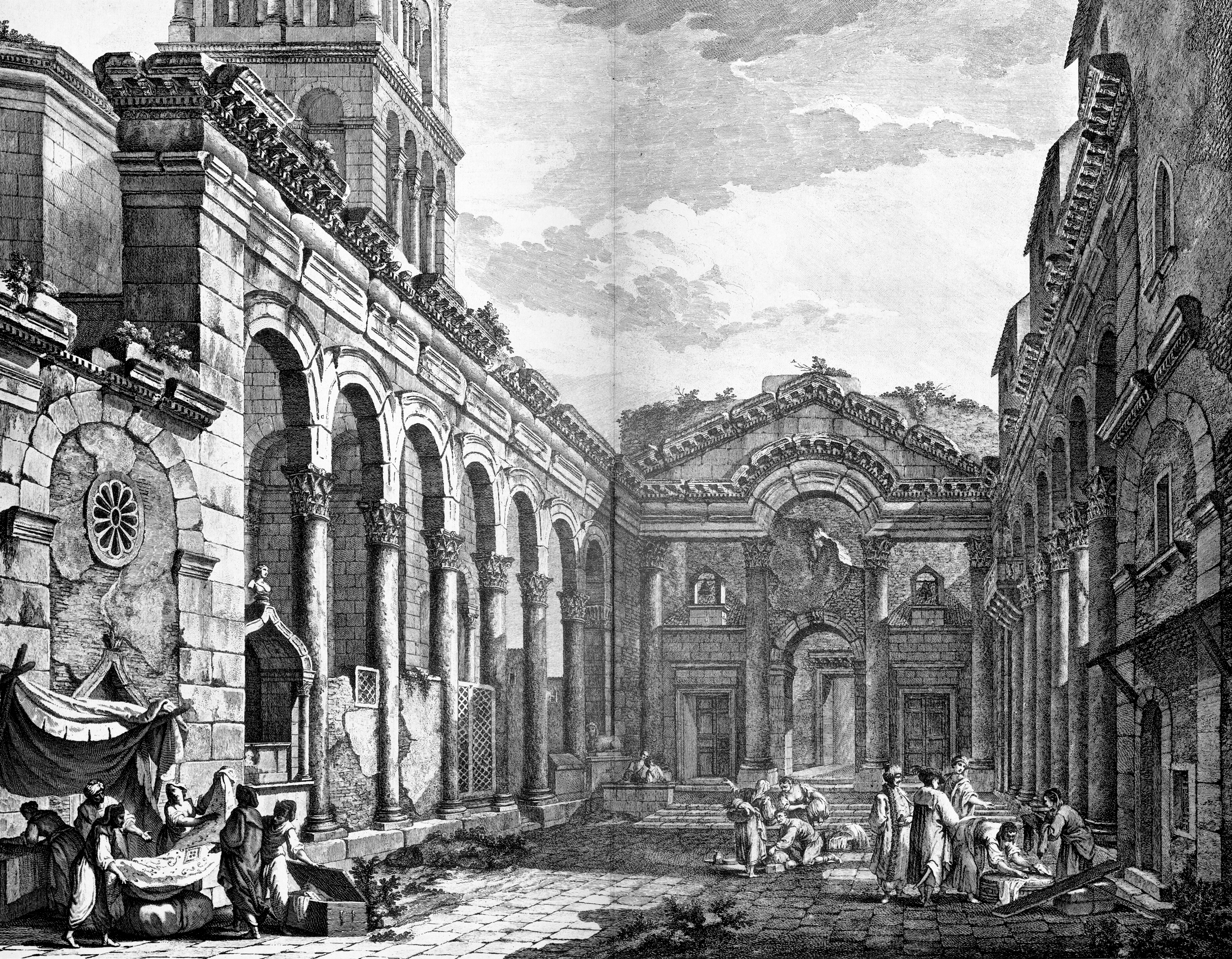
Peristyle of Diocletian's Palace in Split, Croatia. R. Adam 1764

On 3 October 1754, Robert Adam in the company of his brother James (who went as far as Brussels) set off from Edinburgh for his Grand Tour, stopping for a few days in London, where they visited the Mansion House, London, St Stephen Walbrook, St Paul's Cathedral, Windsor, Berkshire, in the company of Thomas Sandby who showed them his landscaping at Windsor Great Park and Virginia Water Lake. They sailed from Dover arriving in Calais on 28 October 1754. He joined Charles Hope-Weir, brother of the Earl of Hopetoun in Brussels and together they travelled to Rome. Hope agreed to take Adam on the tour at the suggestion of his uncle, the Marquess of Annandale, who had undertaken the Grand Tour himself. While in Brussels the pair attended a Play and Masquerade, as well as visiting churches and palaces in the city. They travelled on to Tournai, then Lille, where they visited the citadel designed by Sébastien Le Prestre de Vauban. By 12 November 1754 Adam and Hope were in Paris where they took lodgings in Hotel de Notre Dame.

Adam and Hope travelled on to Italy together, before falling out in Rome over travelling expenses and accommodation. Robert Adam stayed on in Rome until 1757, studying classical architecture and honing his drawing skills. His tutors included the French architect and artist Charles-Louis Clérisseau, and the Italian artist Giovanni Battista Piranesi. Here, he became acquainted with the work of the pioneering classical archaeologist and art historian, theorist Johann Joachim Winckelmann. On his return journey, Adam and Clerisseau spent time intensively studying the ruins of Diocletian's Palace at Spalatro in Dalmatia (now known as Split, in modern Croatia). These studies were later published as Ruins of the Palace of the Emperor Diocletian at Spalatro in Dalmatia in 1764.

=== Architectural practice in London ===
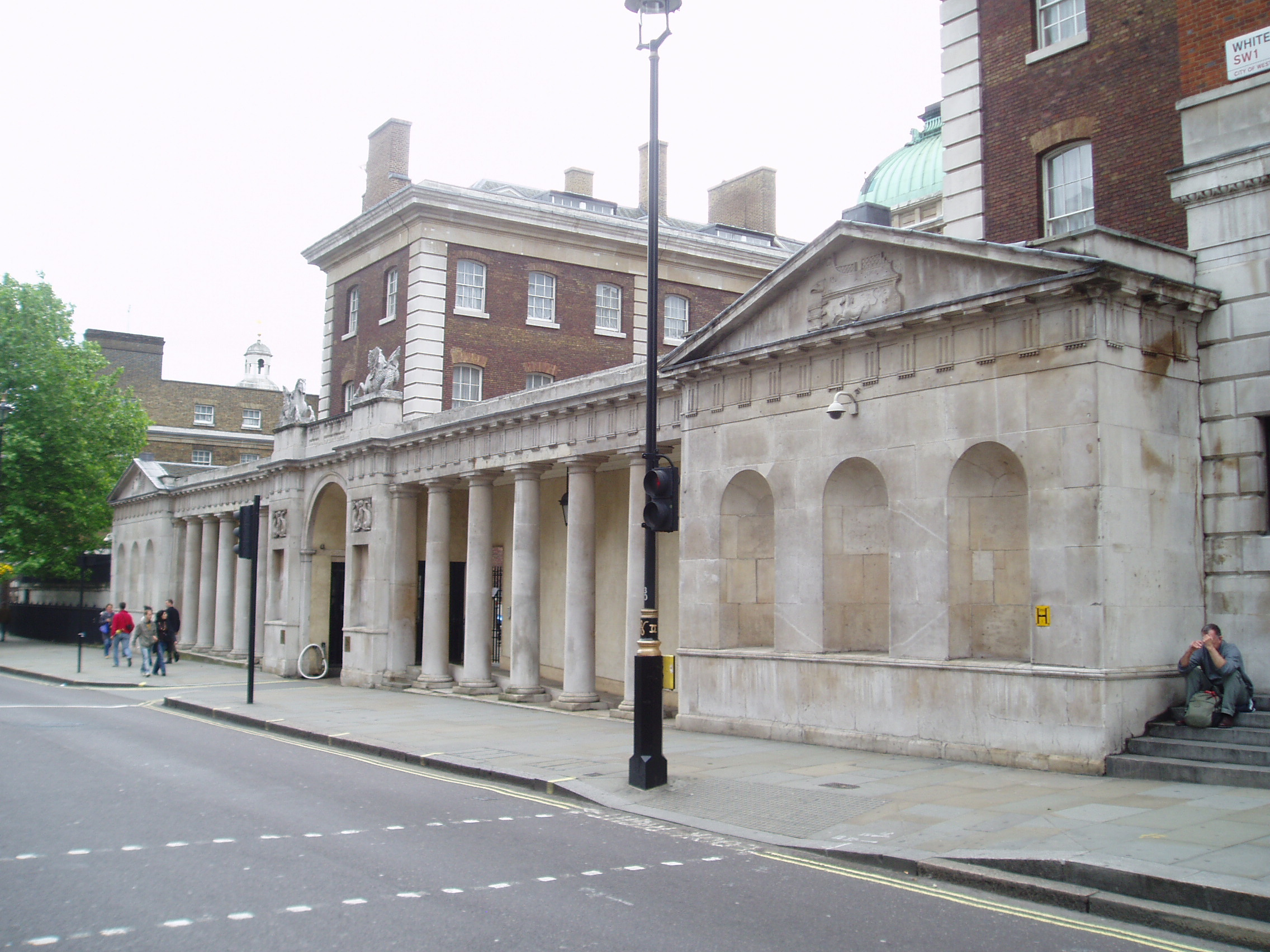
Admiralty Screen 1759–61, Whitehall, London, one of Adam's first executed buildings after his grand tour

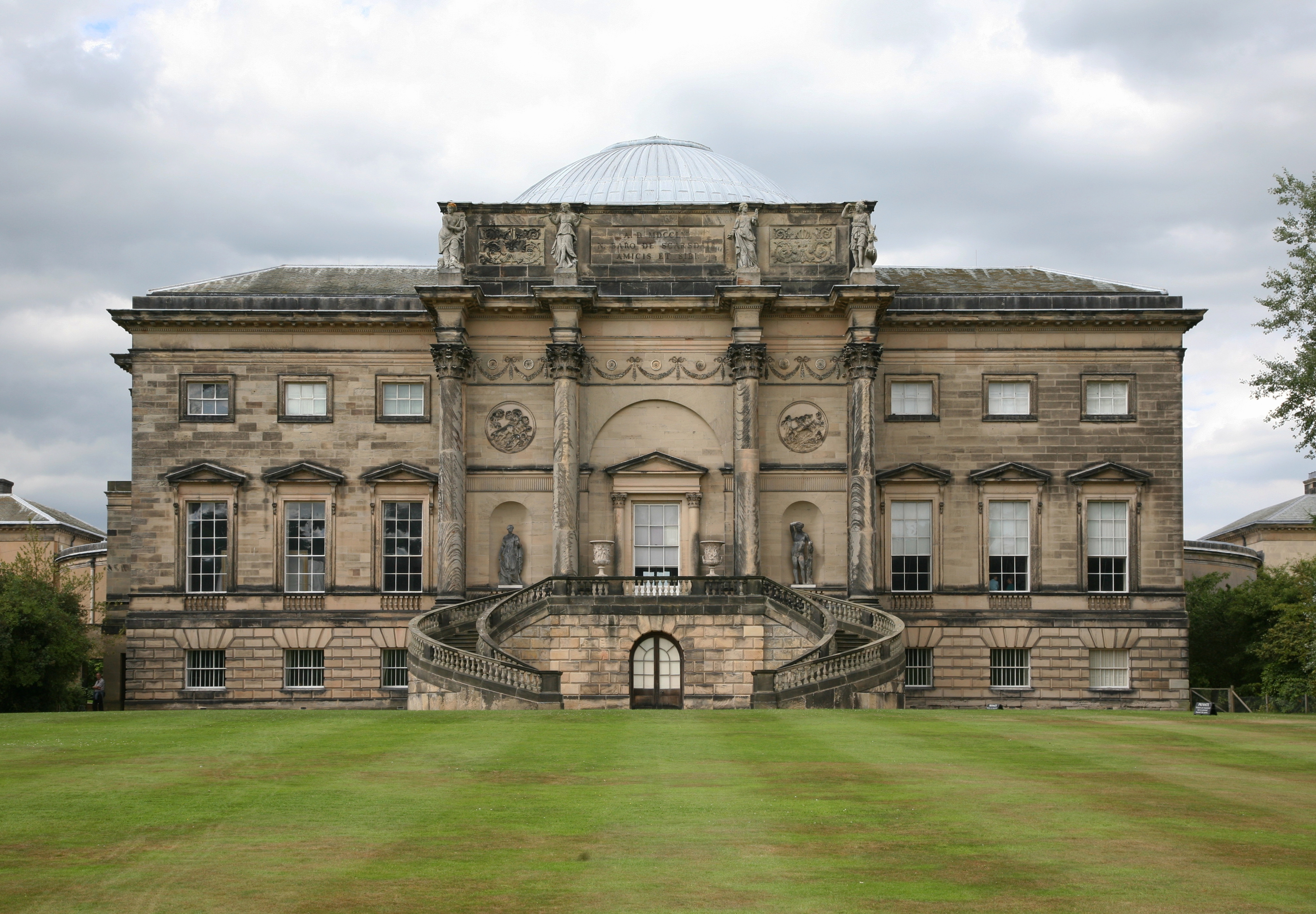
Kedleston Hall in Derbyshire. The south front by Robert Adam, based on the Arch of Constantine in Rome

He returned to Britain in 1758 and set up in business in London with his brother James Adam. They focused on designing complete schemes for the decoration and furnishing of houses. Palladian design was popular, and Robert designed a number of country houses in this style, but he evolved a new, more flexible style incorporating elements of classical Roman design alongside influences from Greek, Byzantine and Baroque styles. The Adam brothers' success can also be attributed to a desire to design everything down to the smallest detail, ensuring a sense of unity in their design. In Adam interiors, all the furnishings were custom designed to accord with the decoration of the room in a unified harmony. Often the carpets were woven to match the intricate patterns of the ceiling above, while every fitting including sconces, mirrors, and doorknobs also received a custom design emulating the motifs of the room.

Adam Buildings Act 1772
- Act of Parliament
- Parliament of Great Britain
- Long title: An Act for enabling John, Robert, James, and William Adam, to dispose of several Houses and Buildings, in the Parish of Saint Martin in the Fields, and Saint Mary le Bone, in the County of Middlesex, and other their Effects, by Way of Chance, in such Manner as may be most for the Benefit of themselves and Creditors.
- Citation: 13 Geo. 3. c. 75

Dates
- Royal assent: 1 July 1773

The Adam practice was not without mishap, however. In 1768 the brothers purchased a 99-year lease for a marshy plot of land beside the Thames in Westminster, where they built a 24-house terrace development known as the Adelphi. The project was very ambitious and is the first instance where terraced houses were designed individually to give unified harmony to the whole development (previously terraced houses were built to one replicated design, side-by-side around a square). However, the project became a white elephant for Robert and his brothers, with uncertain financing and costs spiralling out of control. The houses were built on a huge artificial terrace resting on vaulted substructures on the level of the Thames, which Robert Adam was certain could be leased to the British government as warehouses. However, this intention failed to materialize; the Adam brothers were left with huge debts and, in 1772, had to lay off 3,000 workmen and cease building. Robert Adam himself moved into one of the houses in the Adelphi, along with supportive friends like David Garrick and Josiah Wedgwood, who opened a showroom for his ceramics in one of the houses. In 1774, a public lottery authorised under the Adam Buildings Act 1772 (13 Geo. 3. c. 75) was held to raise funds for the brothers, which allowed them to avert bankruptcy.

== Public life ==
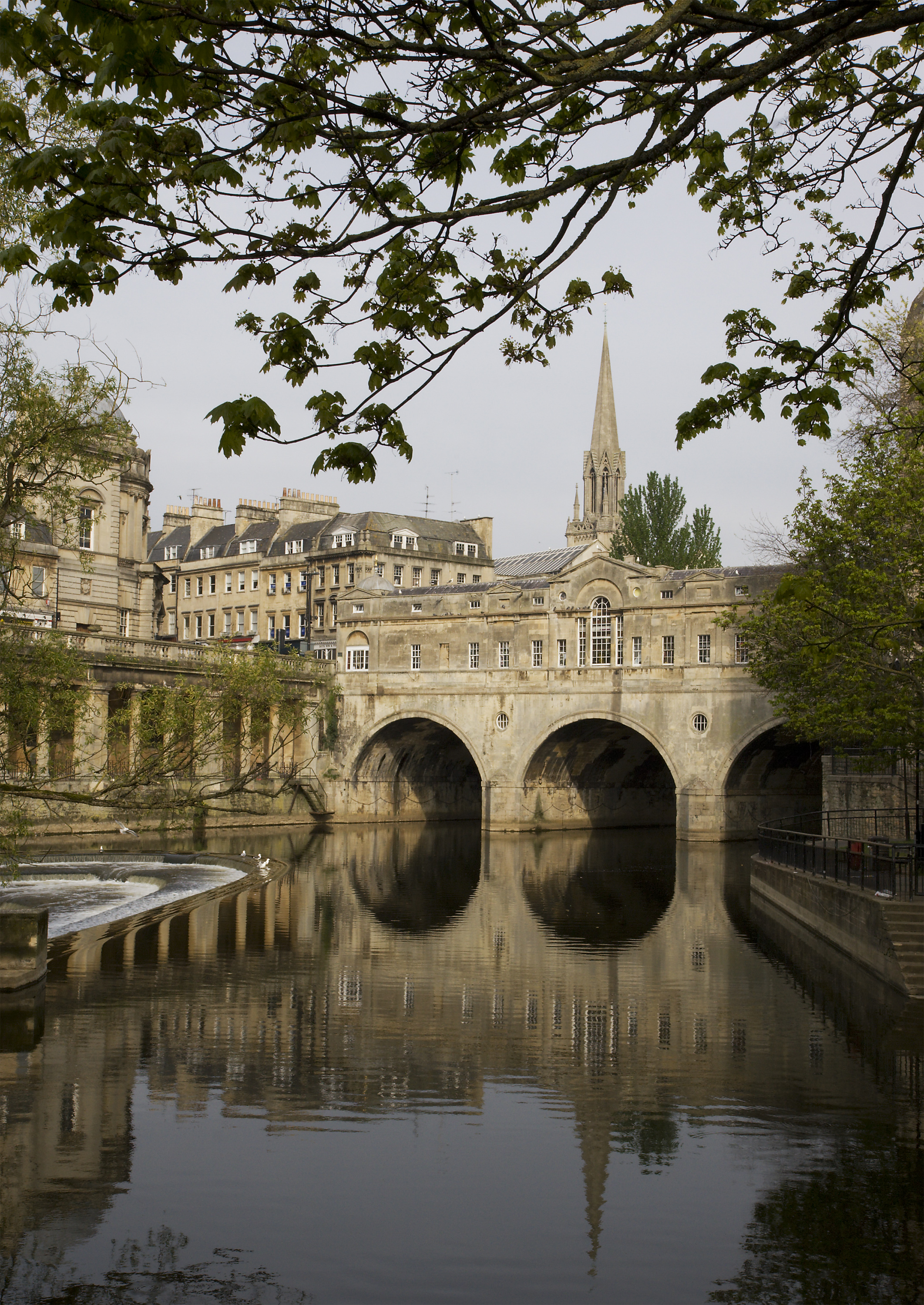
One of Adam's masterpieces: Pulteney Bridge, Bath

Adam was elected a fellow of the Society for the Encouragement of Arts, Manufactures and Commerce in 1758 and of the Society of Antiquaries in 1761, the same year he was appointed Architect of the King's Works (jointly with Sir William Chambers). His younger brother James succeeded him in this post when he relinquished the role in 1768 to devote more time to his elected office as member of Parliament for Kinross-shire.

== Architectural style ==
Adam rejected the Palladian style, as introduced to England by Inigo Jones, and advocated by Lord Burlington, as "ponderous" and "disgustful". However, he continued their tradition of drawing inspiration directly from classical antiquity, during his four-year stay in Europe. Adam developed a new style of architectural decoration, one which was more archaeologically accurate than past neoclassical styles, but nonetheless innovative and not bound only by ancient precedents. In Works in Architecture, co-authored by Robert and James, the brothers stated that Graeco-Roman examples should "serve as models which we should imitate, and as standards by which we ought to judge." The discoveries being made in Herculaneum and Pompeii at the time provided ample material for Robert Adam to draw on for inspiration.

The Adam brothers' principle of "movement" was largely Robert's conception, although the theory was first written down by James. "Movement" relied on dramatic contrasts and diversity of form, and drew on the picturesque aesthetic. The first volume of the Adam brothers' Works (1773) cited Kedleston Hall, designed by Robert in 1761, as an outstanding example of movement in architecture.

By contrasting room sizes and decorative schemes, Adam applied the concept of movement to his interiors also. His style of decoration, described by Pevsner as "Classical Rococo", drew on Roman "grotesque" stucco decoration.

== Influence ==
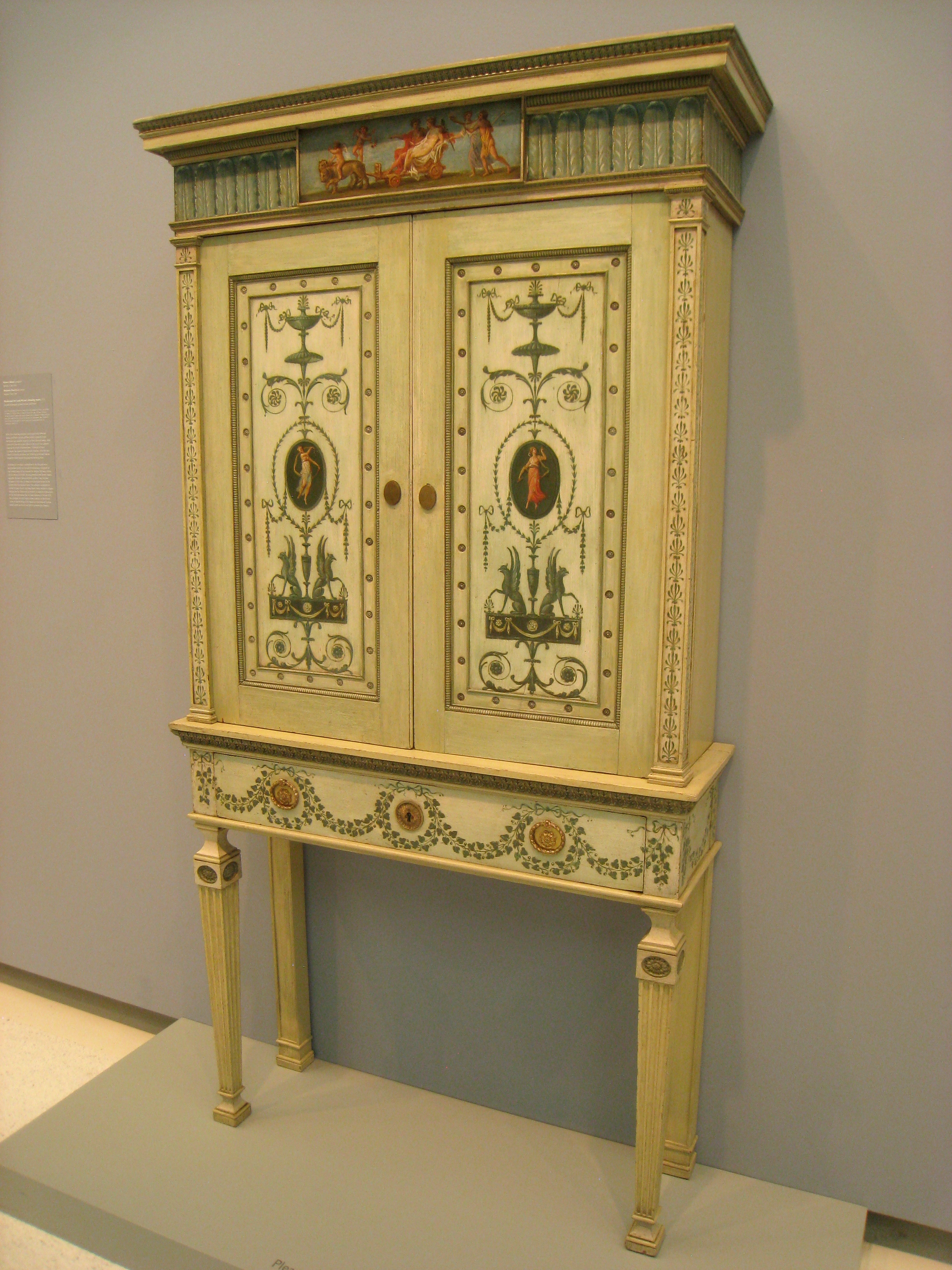
Adam designed bookcase 1776, probably built by Thomas Chippendale

Adam's work had influenced the direction of architecture and design across the western world. In England his collaboration with Thomas Chippendale resulted in some of the finest neoclassicist designs of the time, most notably in the Harewood House collection of Chippendale's work. In North America, the Federal style owes much to neoclassicism as practised by Adam. In Europe, Adam notably influenced Charles Cameron, the Scotsman who designed apartments in the Catherine Palace, Tsarskoye Selo and other Russian palaces for Catherine the Great. However, by the time of his death, Adam's neoclassicism was being superseded in Britain by a more severe, Greek phase of the classical revival, as practised by James "Athenian" Stuart. The Adam brothers employed several draughtsmen who would go on to establish themselves as architects, including George Richardson, and the Italian Joseph Bonomi, whom Robert originally hired in Rome.

=== Written works ===
During their lifetime Robert and James Adam published two volumes of their designs, Works in Architecture of Robert and James Adam (in 1773–1778 and 1779; a third volume was published posthumously, in 1822).

== Death and burial ==
Adam had long suffered from stomach and bowel problems, probably caused by a peptic ulcer and irritable bowel syndrome. While at home – 11 Albemarle Street, London – on 1 March 1792, one of the ulcers burst, and on 3 March Adam died.

The funeral was held on 10 March; he was buried in the south aisle of Westminster Abbey. The pall-bearers were several of his clients: Henry Scott, 3rd Duke of Buccleuch; George Coventry, 6th Earl of Coventry; James Maitland, 8th Earl of Lauderdale; David Murray, 2nd Earl of Mansfield; Lord Frederick Campbell and Sir William Pulteney, 5th Baronet.

Knowing he was dying, he drafted his will on 2 March 1792. Having never married, Adam left his estate to his sisters Elizabeth Adam and Margaret Adam.

His obituary appeared in the March 1792 edition of The Gentleman's Magazine:

It is somewhat remarkable that the Arts should be deprived at the same time of two of their greatest ornaments, Sir Joshua Reynolds and Mr Adam: and it is difficult to say which of them excelled most in his particular profession. ... Mr Adam produced a total change in the architecture of this country: and his fertile genius in elegant ornament was not confined to the decoration of buildings, but has been diffused to every branch of manufacture. His talents extend beyond the lie of his own profession: he displayed in his numerous drawings in landscape a luxuriance of composition, and an effect of light and shadow, which have scarcely been equalled ... to the last period of his life, Mr Adam displayed an increasing vigour of genius and refinement of taste: for in the space of one year preceding his death, he designed eight great public works, besides twenty five private buildings, so various in their style, and so beautiful in their composition, that they have been allowed by the best judges, sufficient of themselves, to establish his fame unrivalled as an artist.

He left nearly 9,000 drawings, 8,856 of which (by both Robert and James Adam) were subsequently purchased in 1833 for £200 by the architect John Soane and are now at the Soane Museum in London.

== List of architectural works ==
Works include:

=== Public buildings ===
- Fort George, Scotland, the buildings within the fort were designed by William Adam, after his death his sons oversaw completion (1748–1769)
- The Argyll Arms, Inveraray (1750–1756)
- The Town House, Inveraray (1750–1757)
- Royal Exchange, Edinburgh, with his brother John Adam (1753–1754)
- Screen in front of the Old Admiralty, Whitehall, London (1760)
- Kedleston Hotel, Quarndon (1760)
- Little Market Hall, High Wycombe, Buckinghamshire (1761) later altered
- Riding School, Edinburgh (1763) demolished
- Courts of Justice and Corn Market, Hertford, Hertfordshire, now Shire Hall (1768). Altered, but partially restored to original design. A joint project with James Adam.
- Pulteney Bridge, Bath (1770)
- County House, Kinross (1771)
- Royal Society for the encouragement of Arts, Manufactures & Commerce (1772)
- Register House, Edinburgh (1774–1789)
- Market Cross, Bury St Edmunds, refaced and upper floor added (a theatre now art gallery) (1776)
- Theatre Royal, Drury Lane, London, remodelled, (1775) demolished
- Red Lion Inn, Pontefract (1776)
- Drummonds Bank, Charing Cross, London (1777–1778) demolished
- Home House, London (1777)
- Old College, University of Edinburgh, (1788–onwards) completed to an amended design by William Henry Playfair 1831
- The Bridewell, Edinburgh, (1791) demolished
- The Assembly Rooms, Glasgow (1791–1794) demolished
- Trades Hall, Glasgow, Scotland (1791–1792) (completed 1792–1802 by his brothers)
- Glasgow Royal Infirmary (1791–1794) rebuilt 1914
- Coutts Bank enclosed bridge, John Adam Street (1799) later demolished
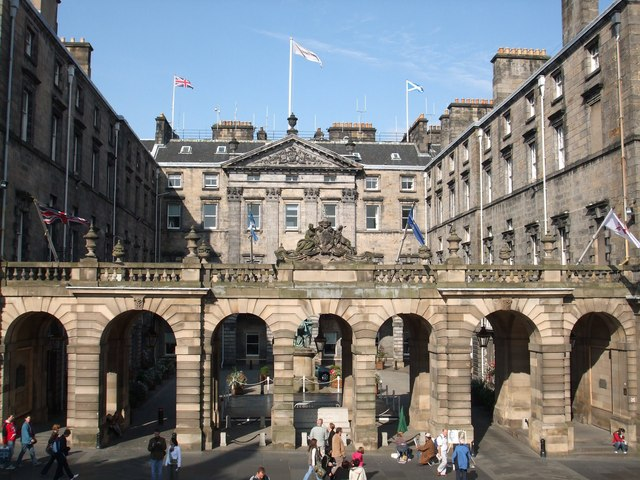
City Chambers, Edinburgh

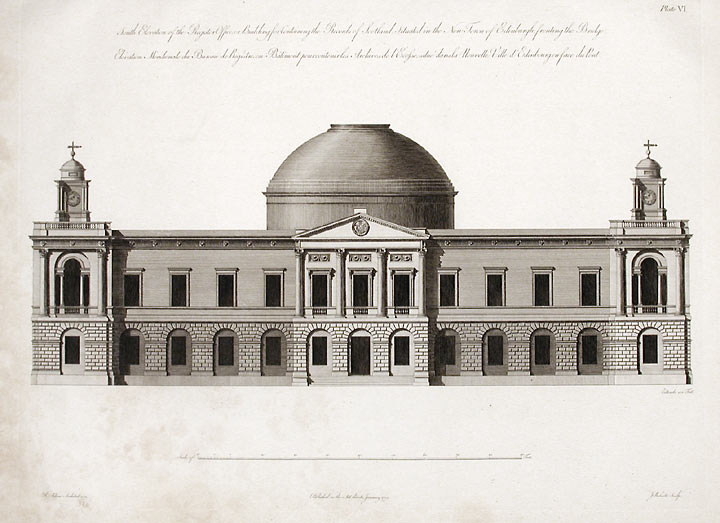
Register House, Edinburgh

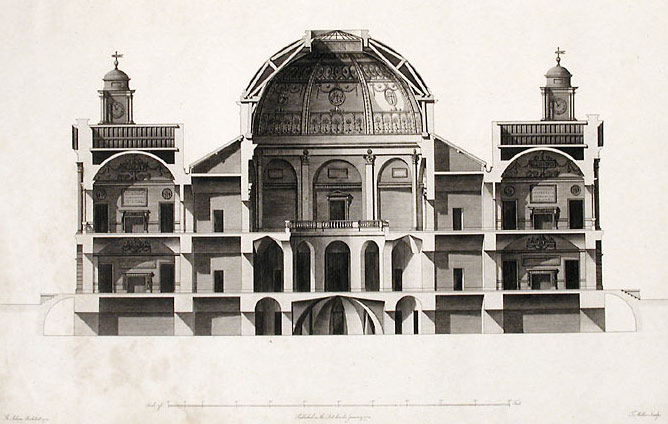
Register House, cross section, Edinburgh

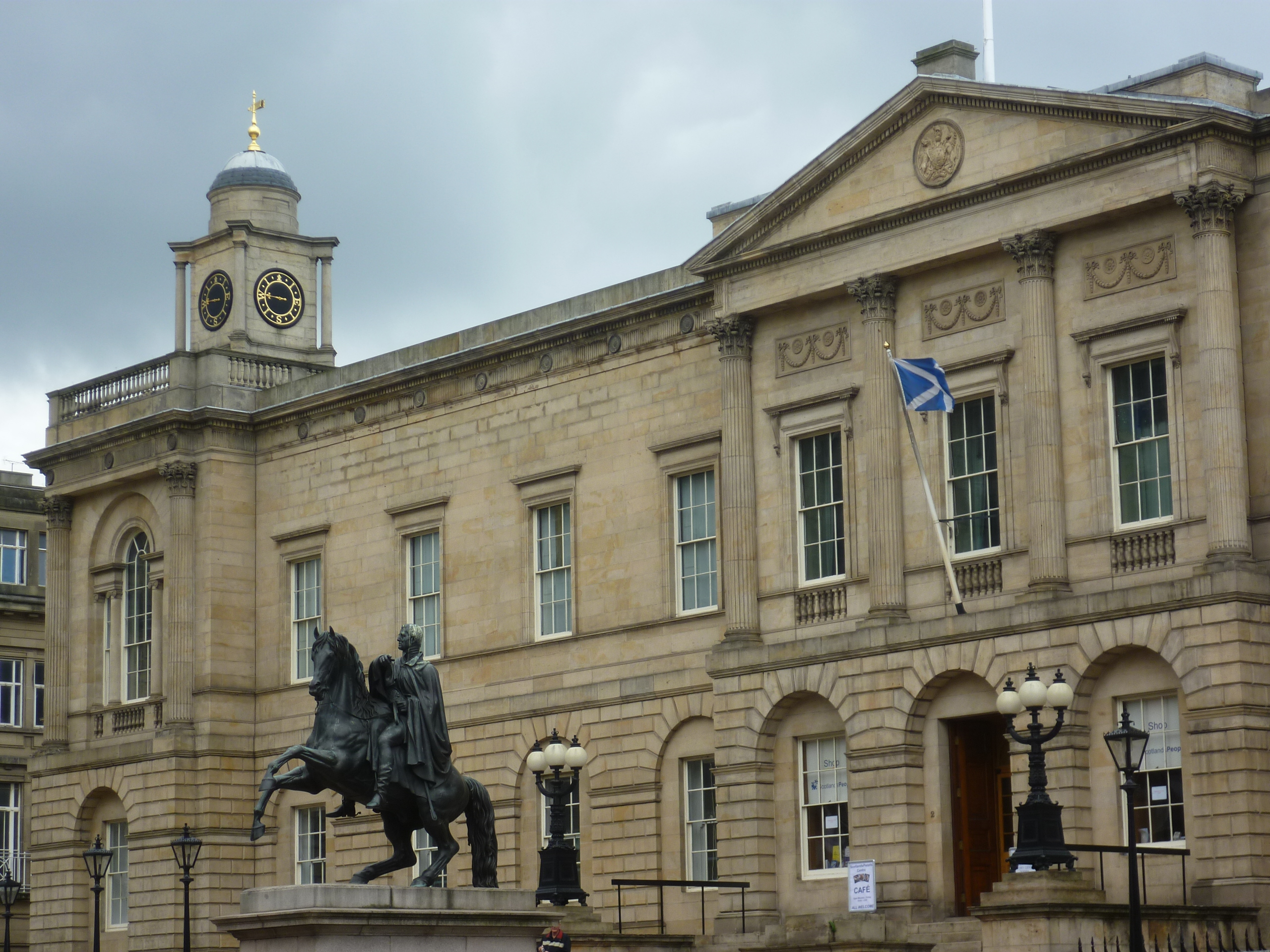
Register House, Edinburgh

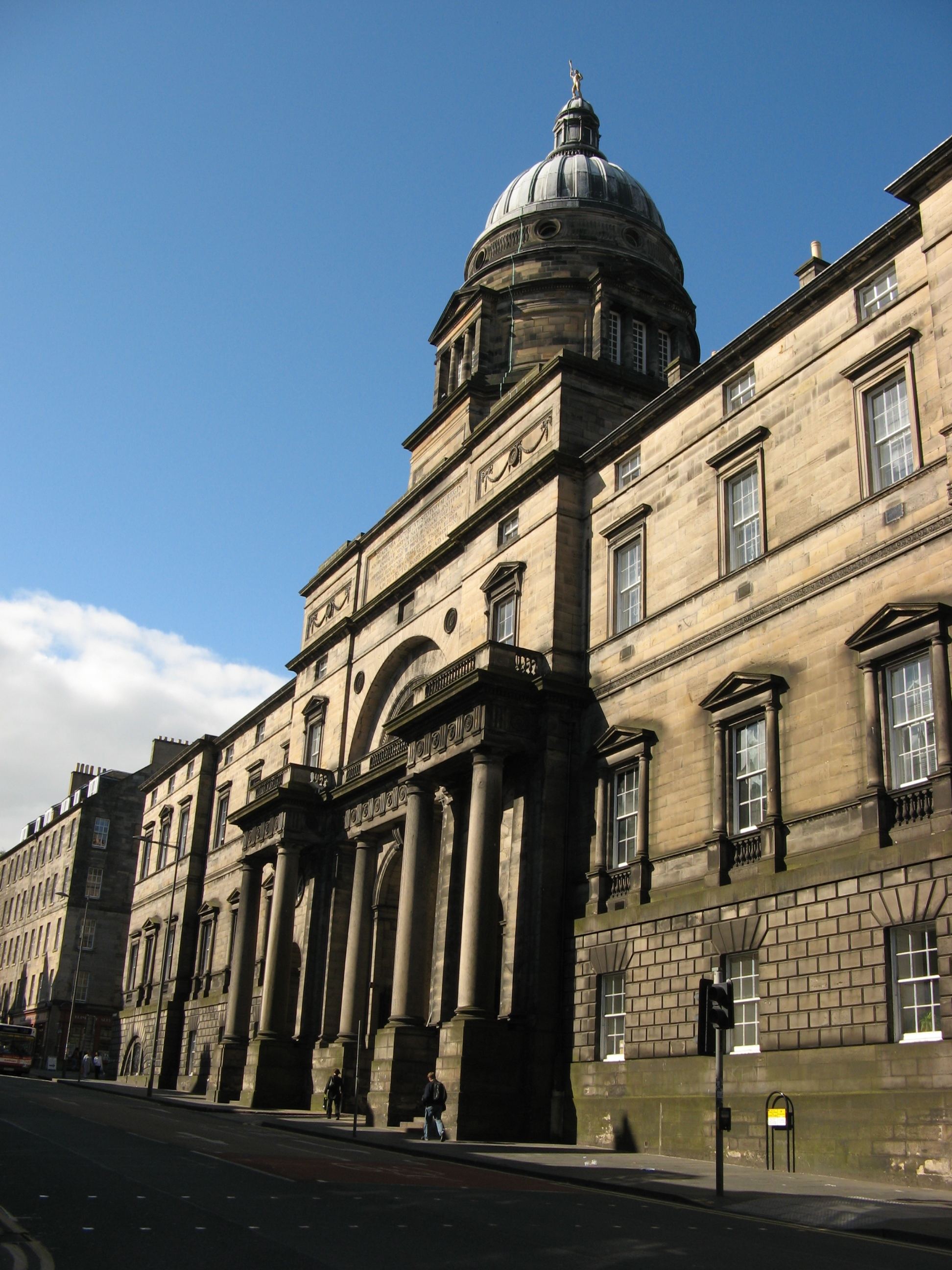
Old College Edinburgh, Dome added later

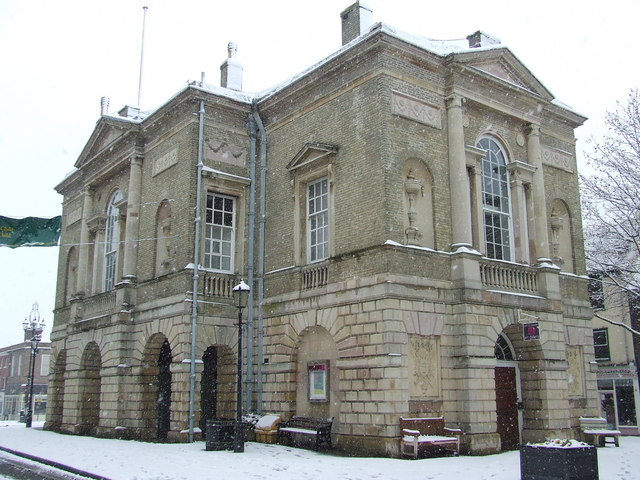
Market Cross, Bury St Edmunds

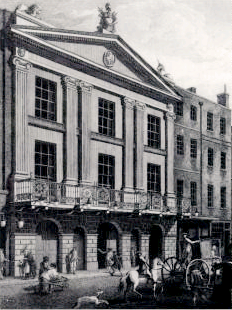
Theatre Royal Drury Lane, London, rebuilt

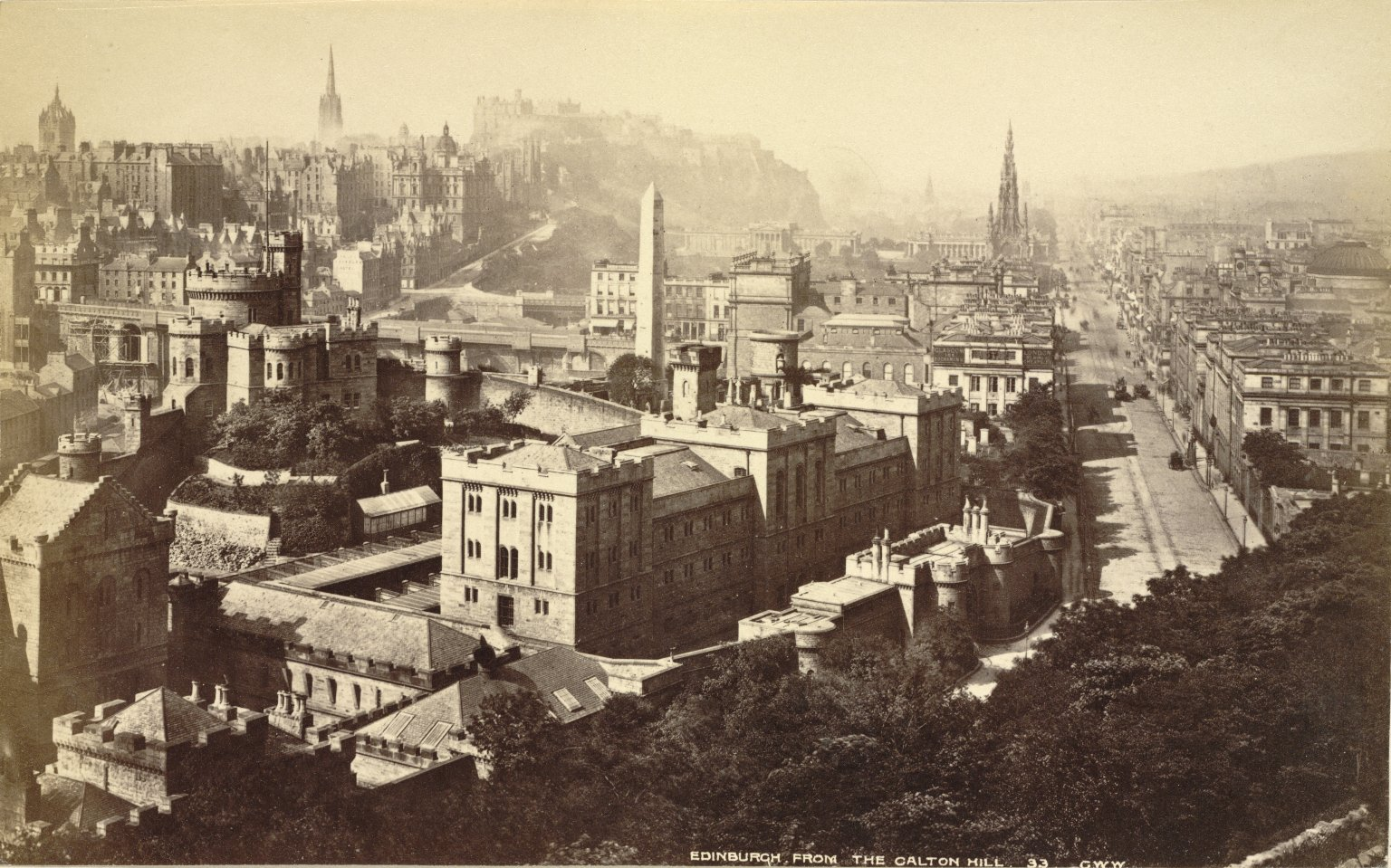
Edinburgh Bridewell in foreground, demolished

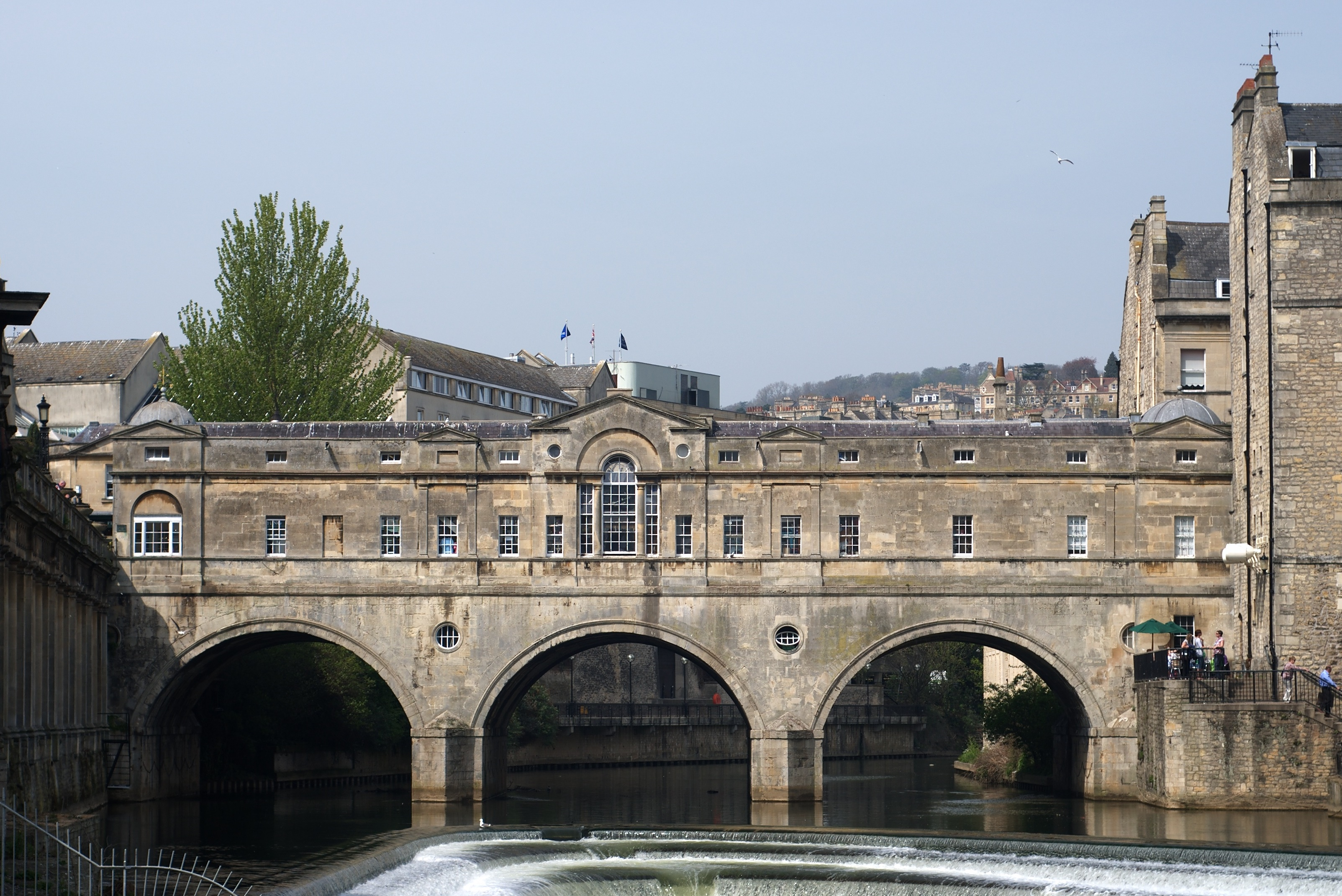
Pulteney Bridge, Bath

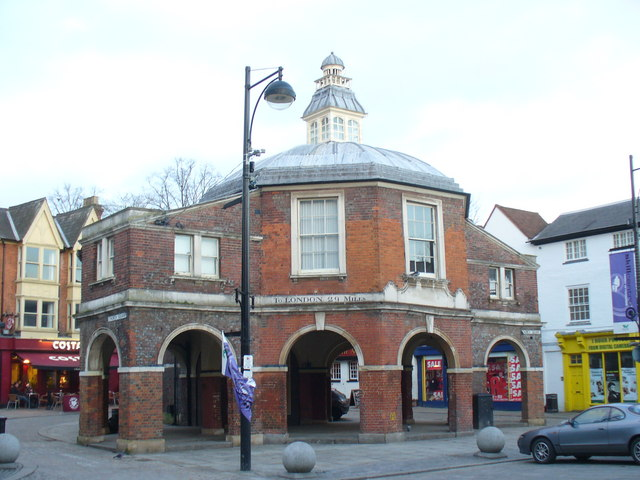
Little Market Hall, High Wycombe

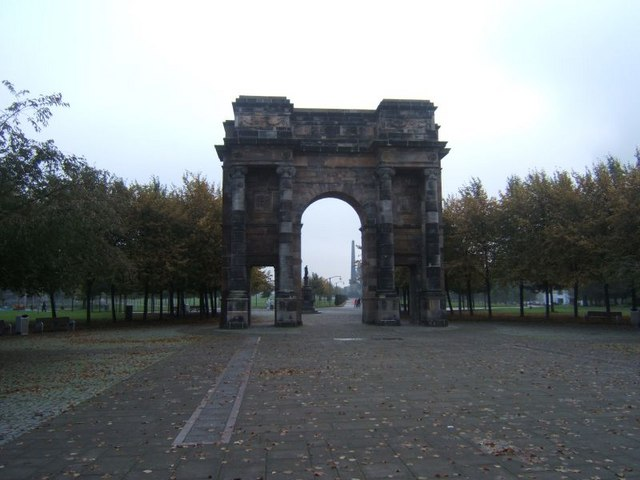
McLennan Arch, Glasgow, built from the remains of Glasgow Assembly Rooms

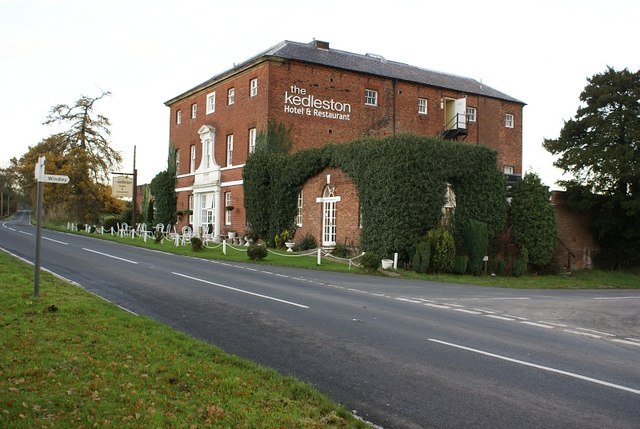
Kedleston Hotel, Quarndon

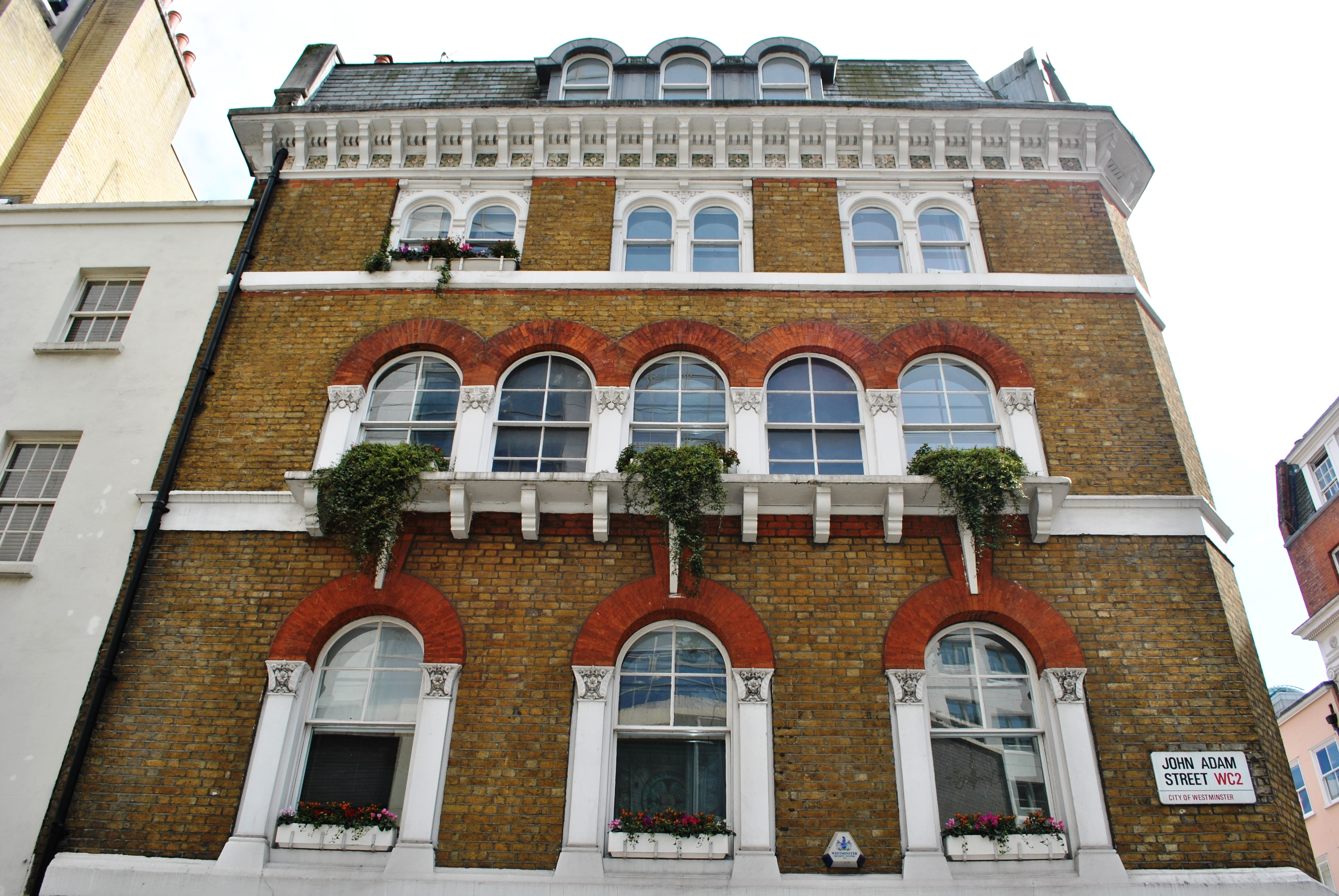
Coutts Bank, John Adam Street, demolished and replaced with this building

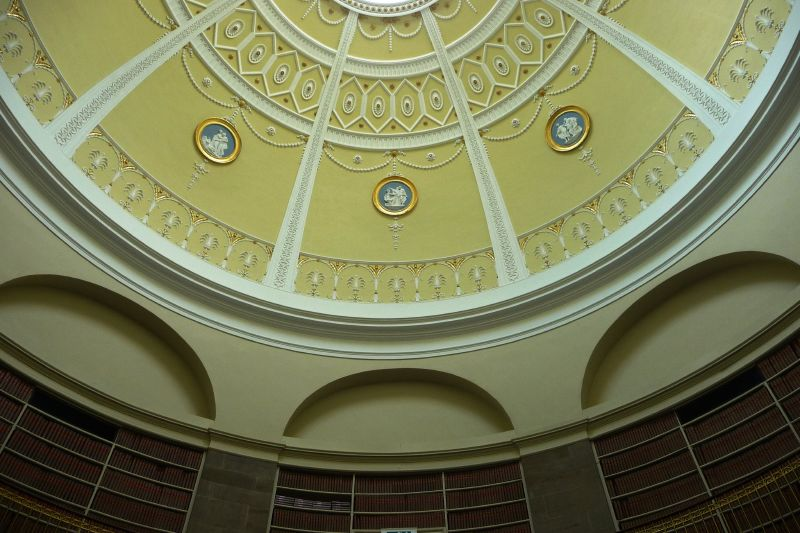
Register House Edinburgh, interior of the dome

=== Churches ===
- Yester Chapel, Lothian, new west front in Gothic style (1753)
- Cumnock church, Ayrshire (1753–1754) demolished
- St. Mary Magdalene, Croome Park, interior (1761–1763) the church was designed by Lancelot "Capability" Brown
- St. Andrew's Church, Gunton Hall, Gunton, Norfolk (1769)
- St Mary's, Mistley (1776) only the towers survive
- St. George's Chapel, Edinburgh, (1792) demolished
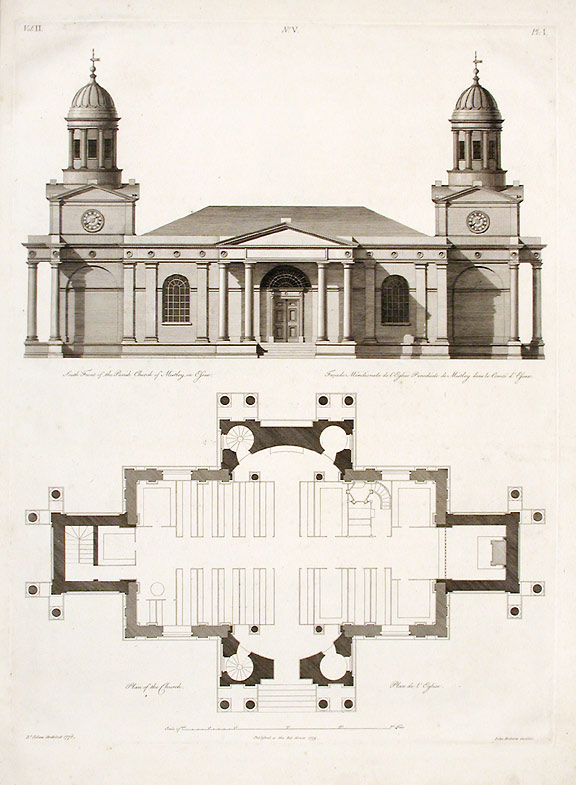
Mistley Church as built

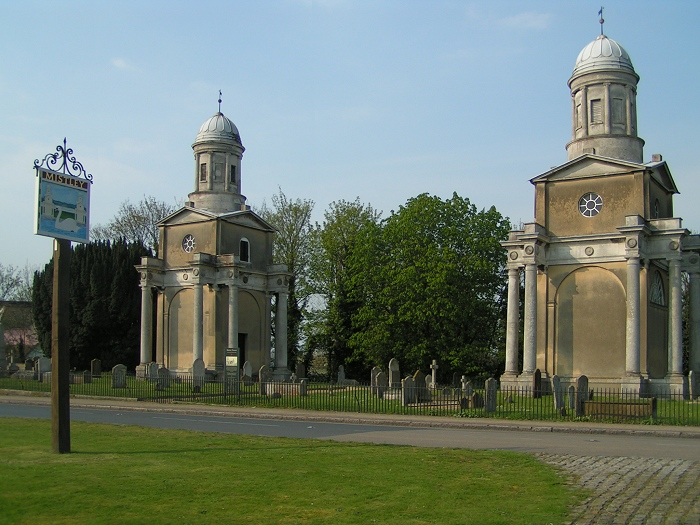
Mistley Church as it survives

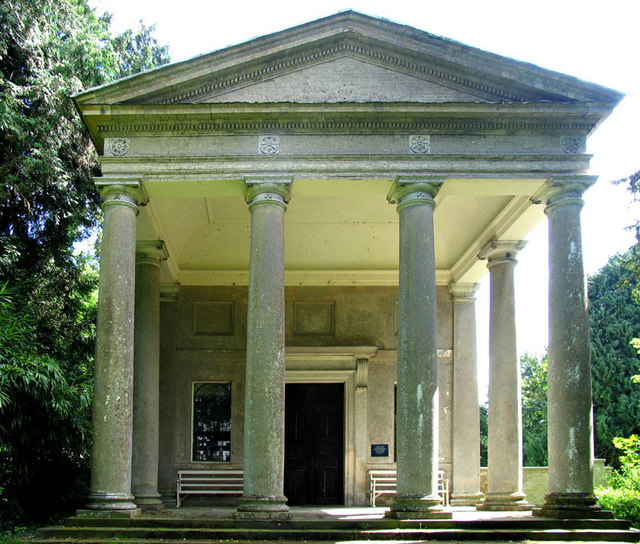
St. Andrew's Church Gunton

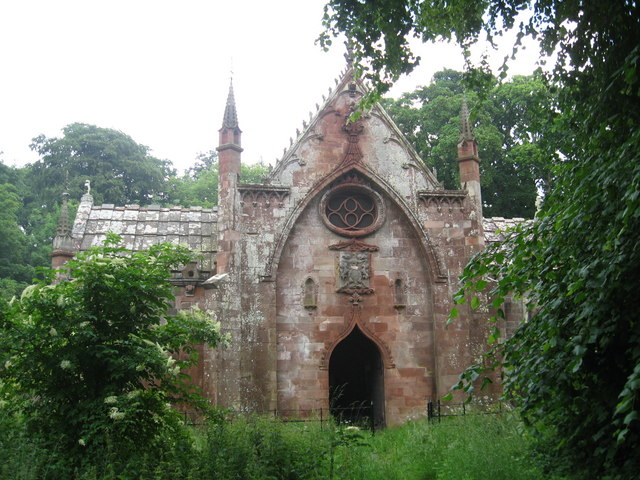
Yester Chapel, west front

=== Mausoleums ===
- William Adam Mausoleum, Greyfriars Kirkyard (1753–1755)
- Bowood House Mausoleum (1761–1764)
- David Hume Mausoleum, Old Calton Cemetery (1777–1778)
- Templetown Mausoleum, Castle Upton, County Antrim Ireland (1789) for 2nd Lord Templetown.
- Johnstone Family Mausoleum, Ochil Road graveyard, Alva, Clackmannanshire (1789–1790)
- Johnstone Family Mausoleum, Westerkirk graveyard, near Bentpath, Dumfries and Galloway (1790)
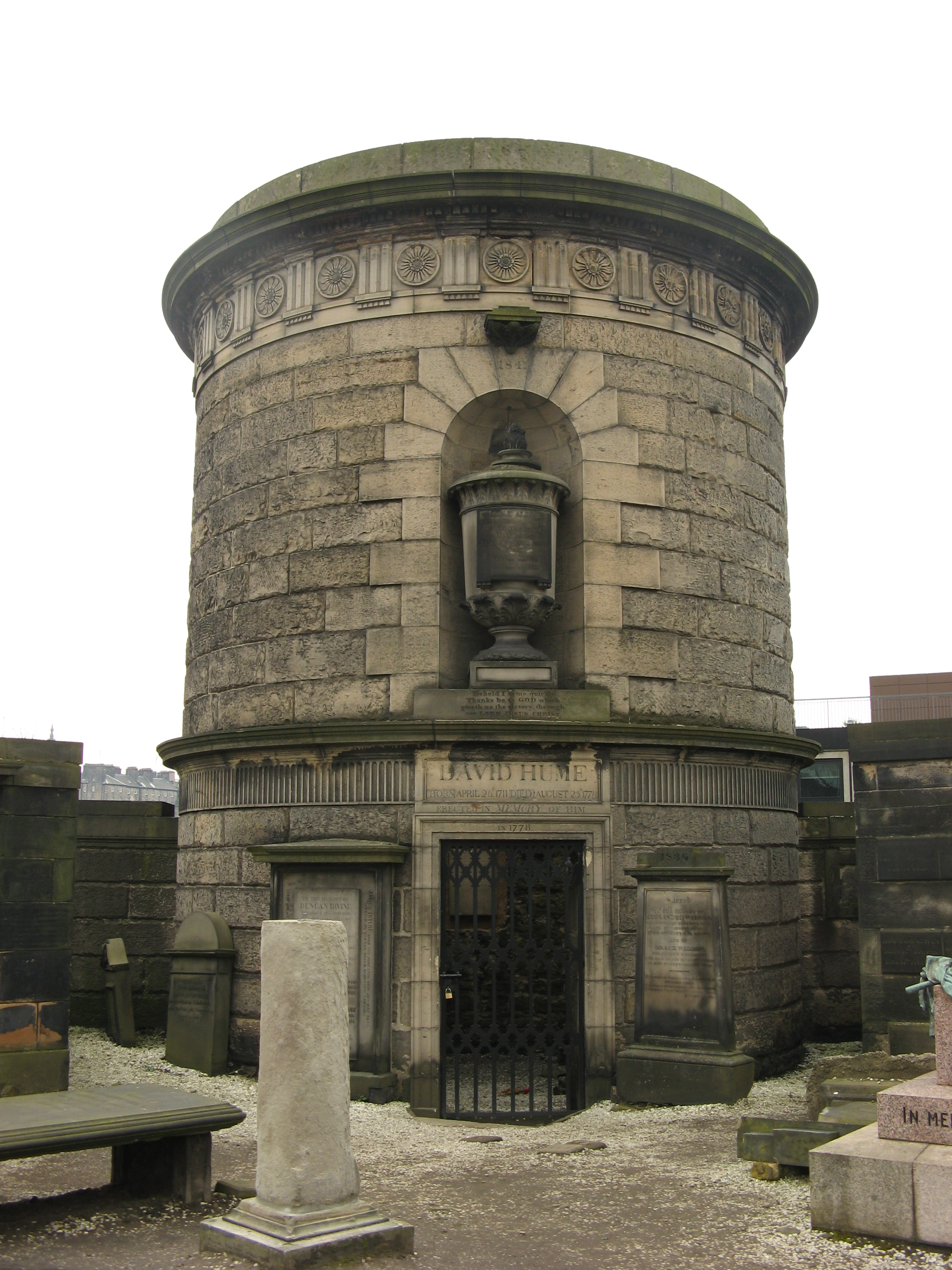
David Hume Mausoleum

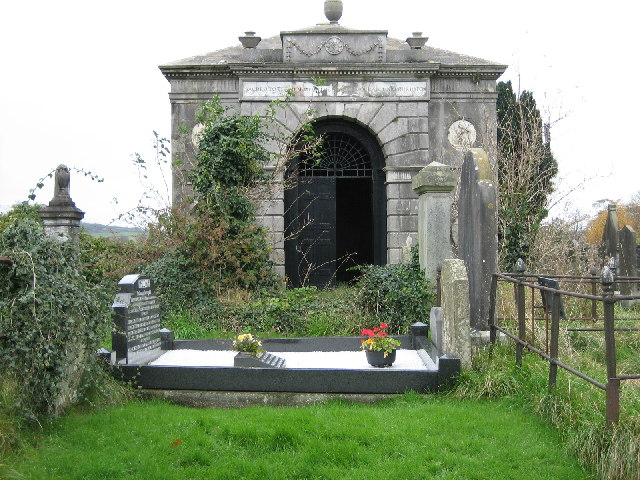
Templetown Mausoleum

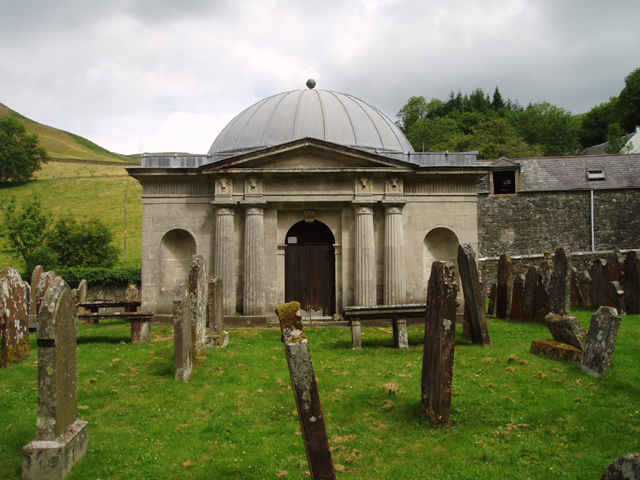
Johnstone Family Mausoleum, Bentpath

=== Urban domestic work ===
- Little Wallingford House, Whitehall, London, alterations (1761) demolished
- Lansdowne House, Berkeley Square, London (1762–1767), partially demolished, the Dining Room is in the Metropolitan Museum of Art and the Drawing Room is in Philadelphia Museum of Art
- 34 Pall Mall, London (1765–1766) demolished
- Langford House, Mary Street, Dublin, Ireland. (1765) First recorded work in Ireland remodelling of house for Rt. Hon. Hercules Langford Rowley. Demolished 1931.
- 16 Hanover Square, London, alterations (1766–1767) demolished
- Deputy Ranger's lodge, Green Park, London (1768–1771) demolished in the 19th century
- The Adelphi development, London (1768–1775) mostly demolished 1930s, a ceiling & fireplace are in the Victoria and Albert Museum
- Chandos House, London (1770–1771)
- 8 Queen Street, Edinburgh (1770–1771) originally designed for Lord Chief Baron Ord, now housing the Royal College of Physicians of Edinburgh
- Mansfield Street, London (1770–1772)
- Northumberland House, London, alterations (1770) demolished, parts of the Glass Drawing Room survive in the Victoria and Albert Museum
- 20 St. James's Square (1771–1774)
- 33 St. James's Square (1771–1773)
- Ashburnham House, Dover Street, London, alterations (1773)
- Derby House, 26 Grosvenor Square (1773–1774) demolished
- Portland Place, London (1773–1794) (only a few houses survive)
- 11 St. James's Square (1774–1776)
- Frederick's Place, London (1775–1778)
- Roxburghe House, Hanover Square, London (1776–1778) demolished
- Home House, London (1777 – before 1784)
- 31 (now 17) Hill Street, London alterations (1777–1779)
- Apsley House, London (1778) altered
- Cumberland House, Pall Mall, London, alterations and interiors (1780–1788) demolished
- Marlborough House, Brighton (1786)
- Fitzroy Square, London (1790–1794) only the south and east sides were built
- Charlotte Square (north side), Edinburgh (1791–1794)
- 169–185 High Street, Glasgow (1793) demolished
- 1–3 Robert Street
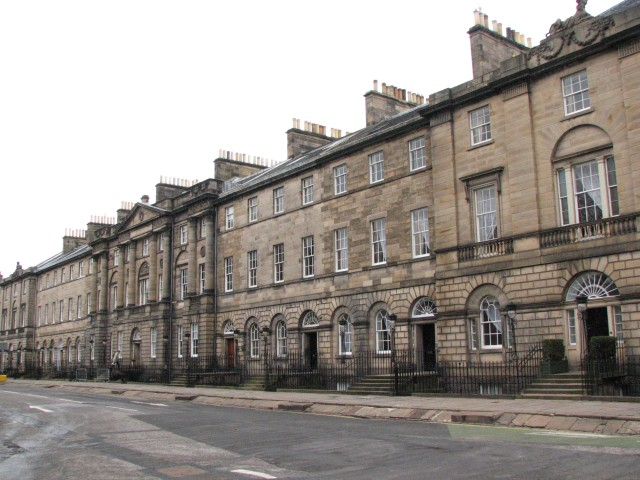
North side, Charlotte Square, Edinburgh

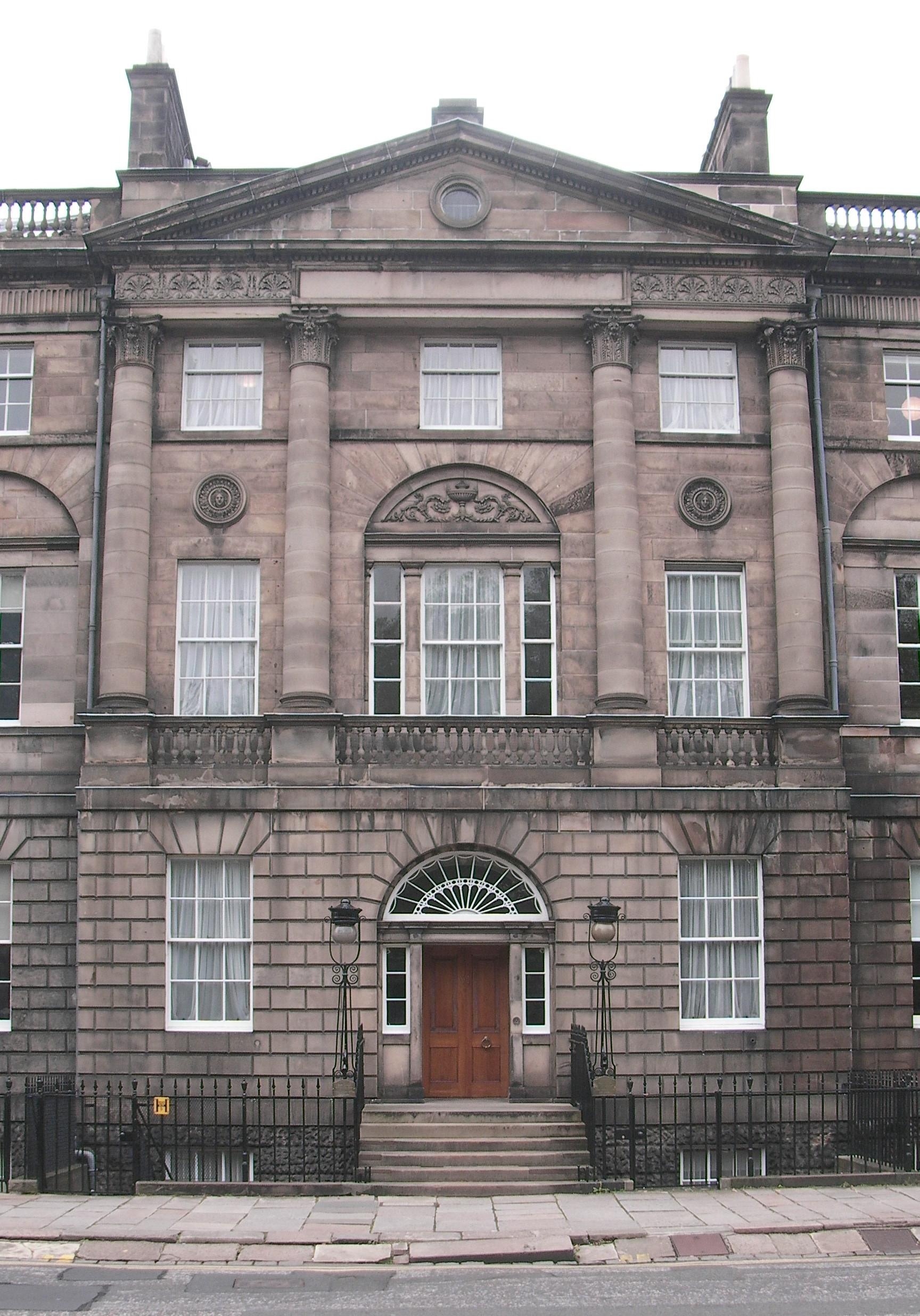
Centre of North side, Charlotte Square, Edinburgh

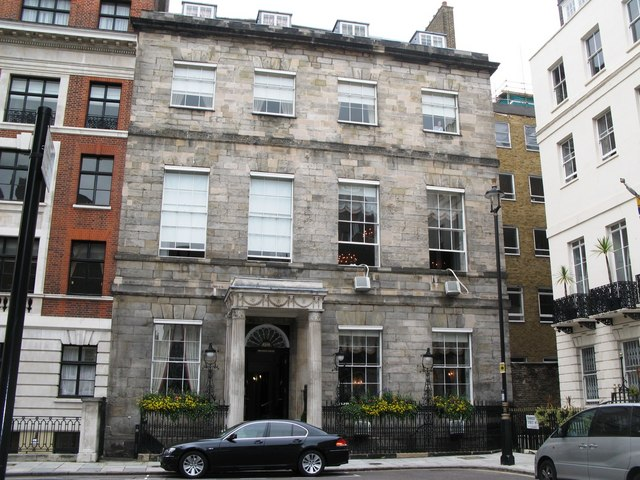
Chandos House London

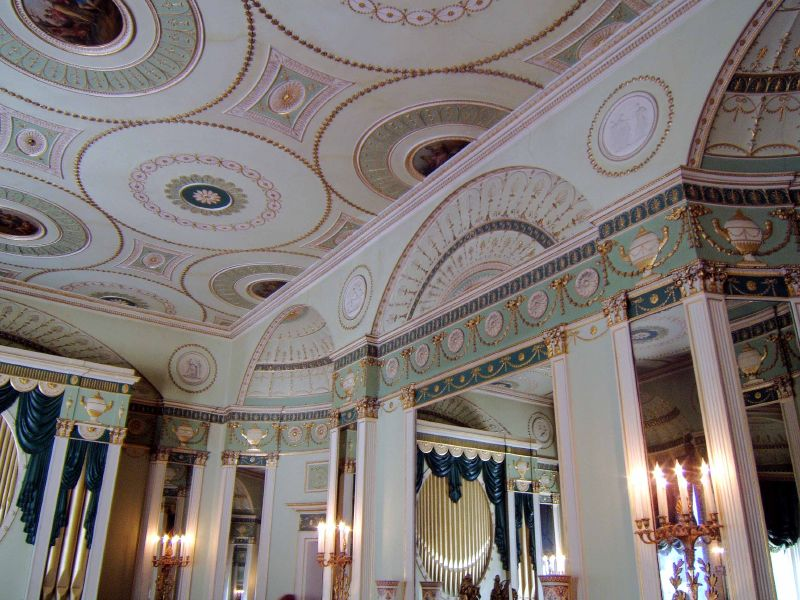
Music Room, Home House, London

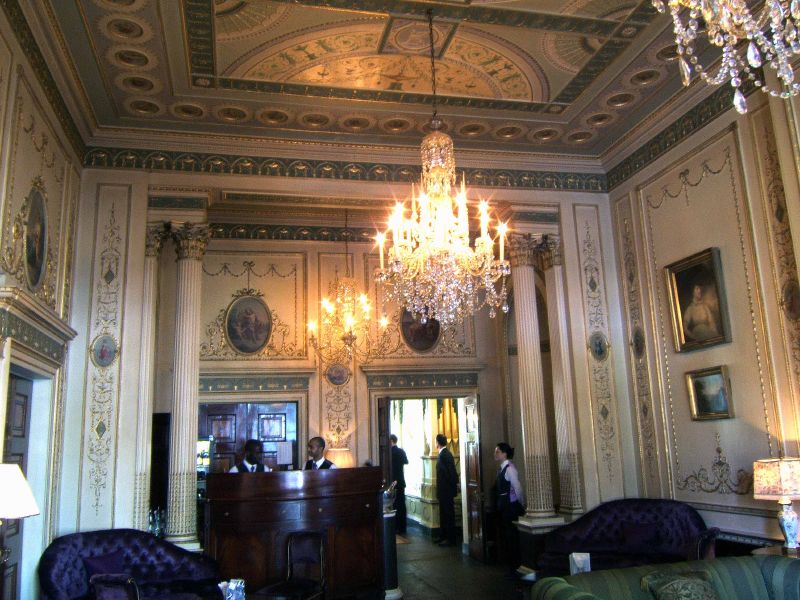
Drawing Room, Home House, London

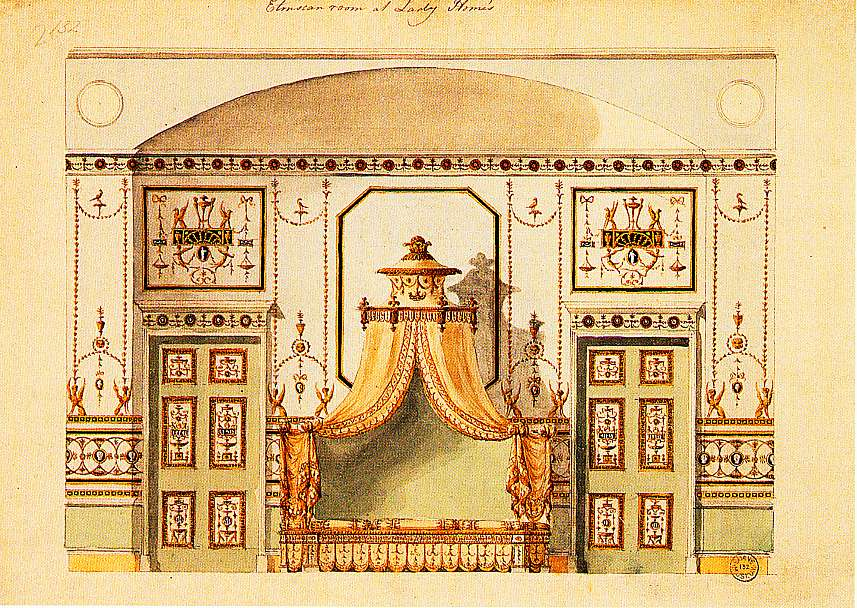
Design for the Etruscan Room, Home House, London

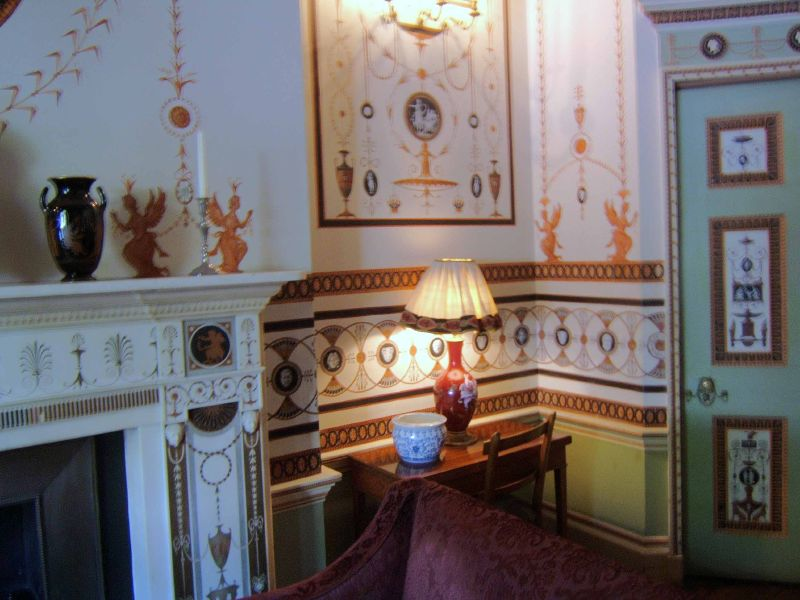
Detail of the Etruscan Room, Home House, London

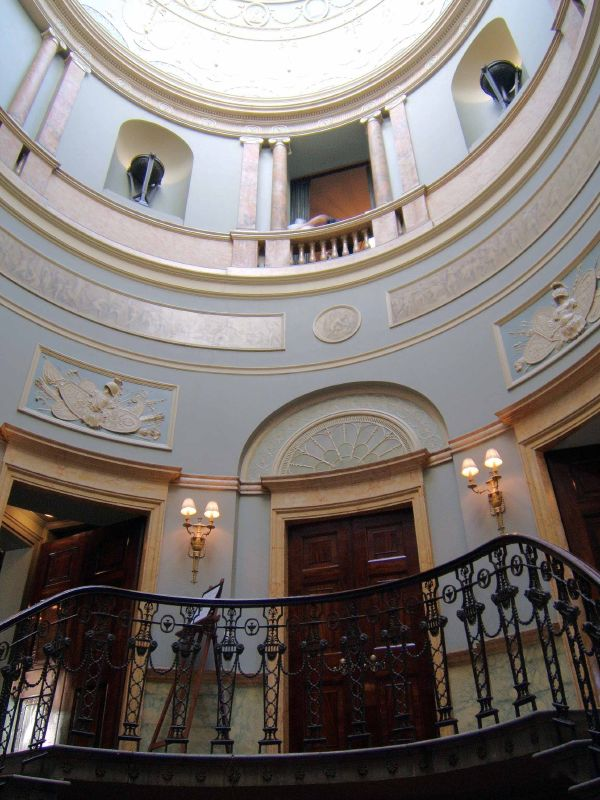
Staircase, Home House, London

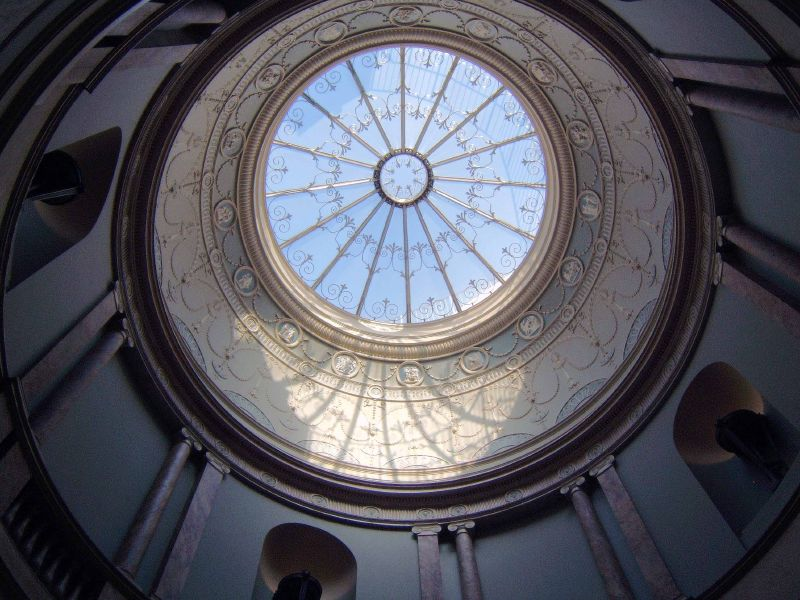
Staircase Dome, Home House, London

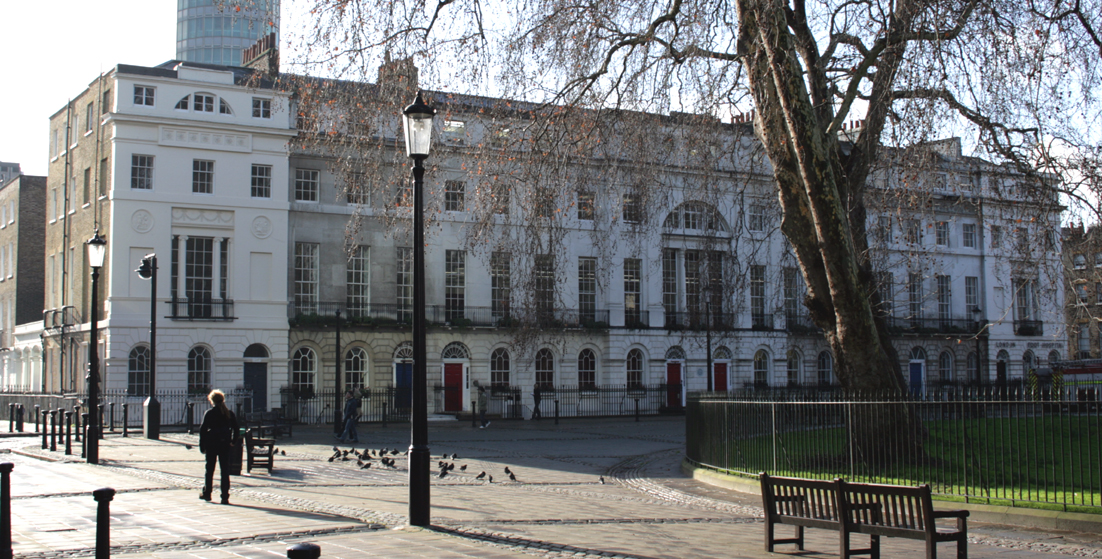
South side, Fitzroy Square, London

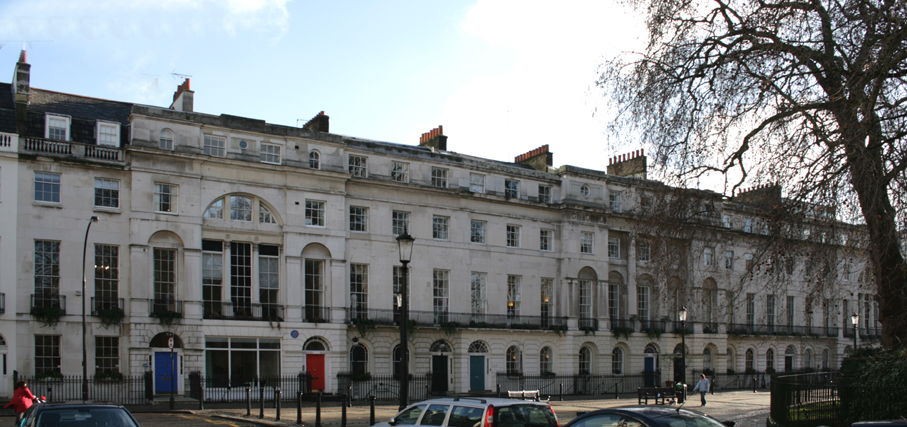
East side, Fitzroy Square, London

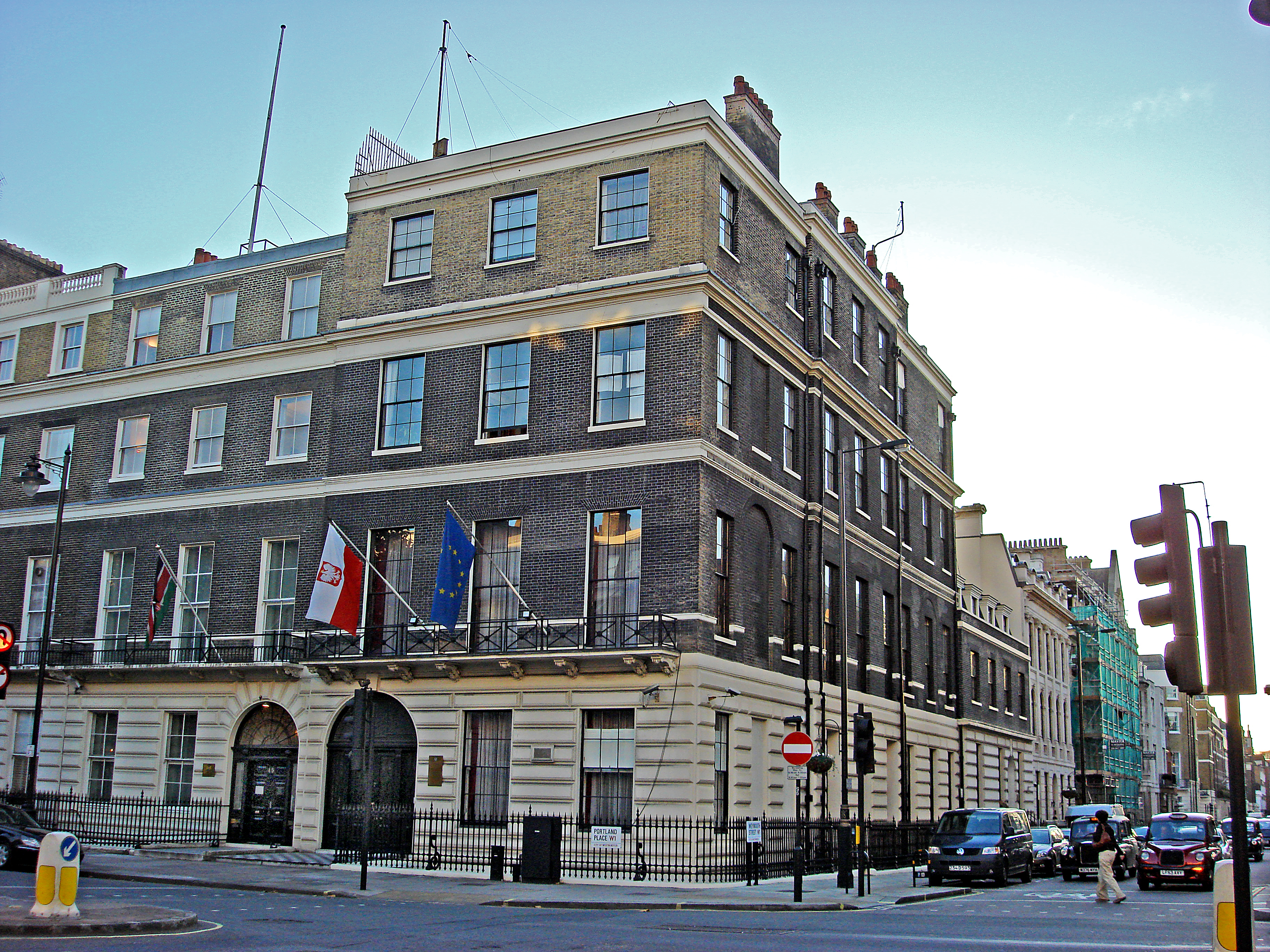
Surviving Adam Houses, Portland Place, London

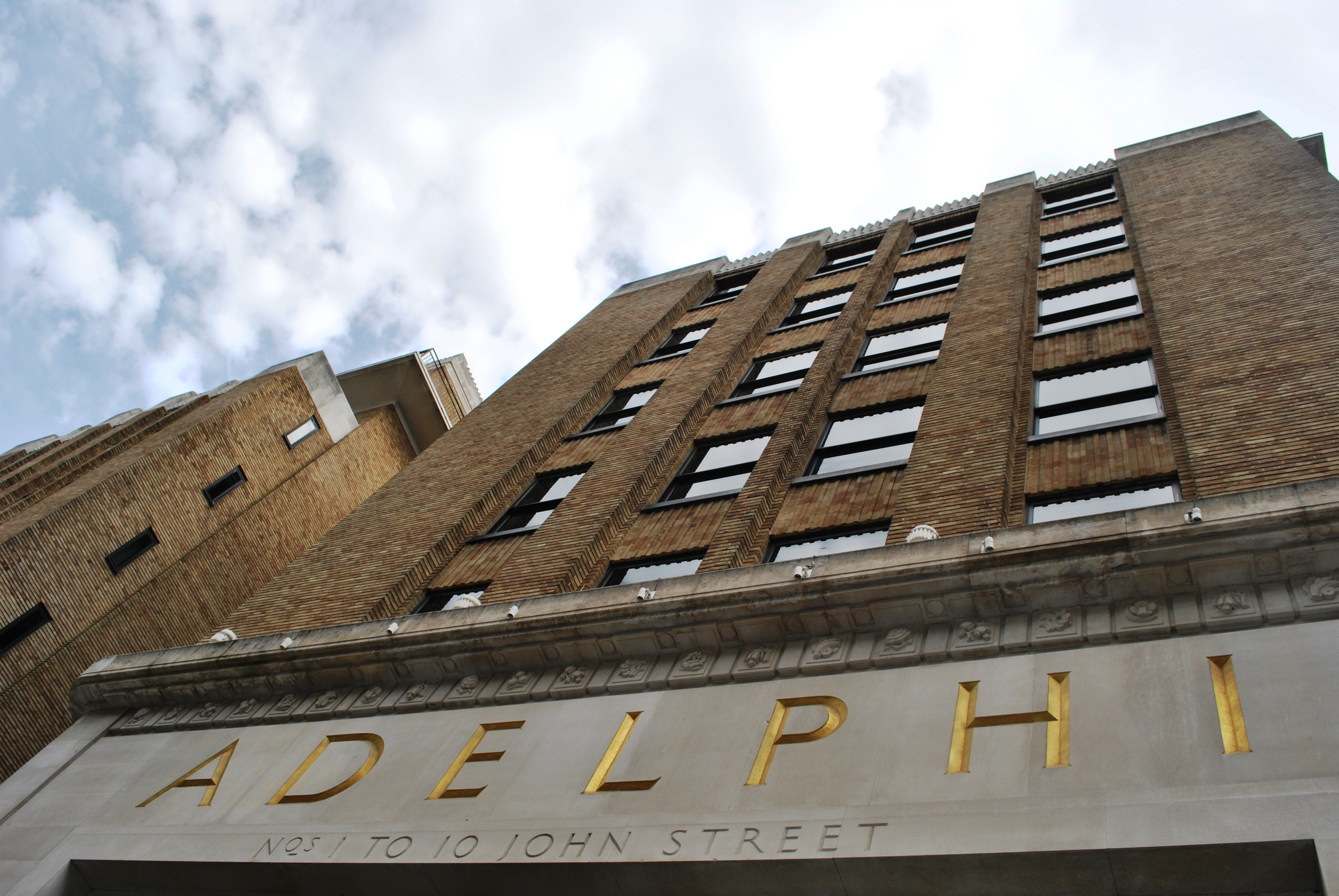
The Adelphi, London, largely demolished

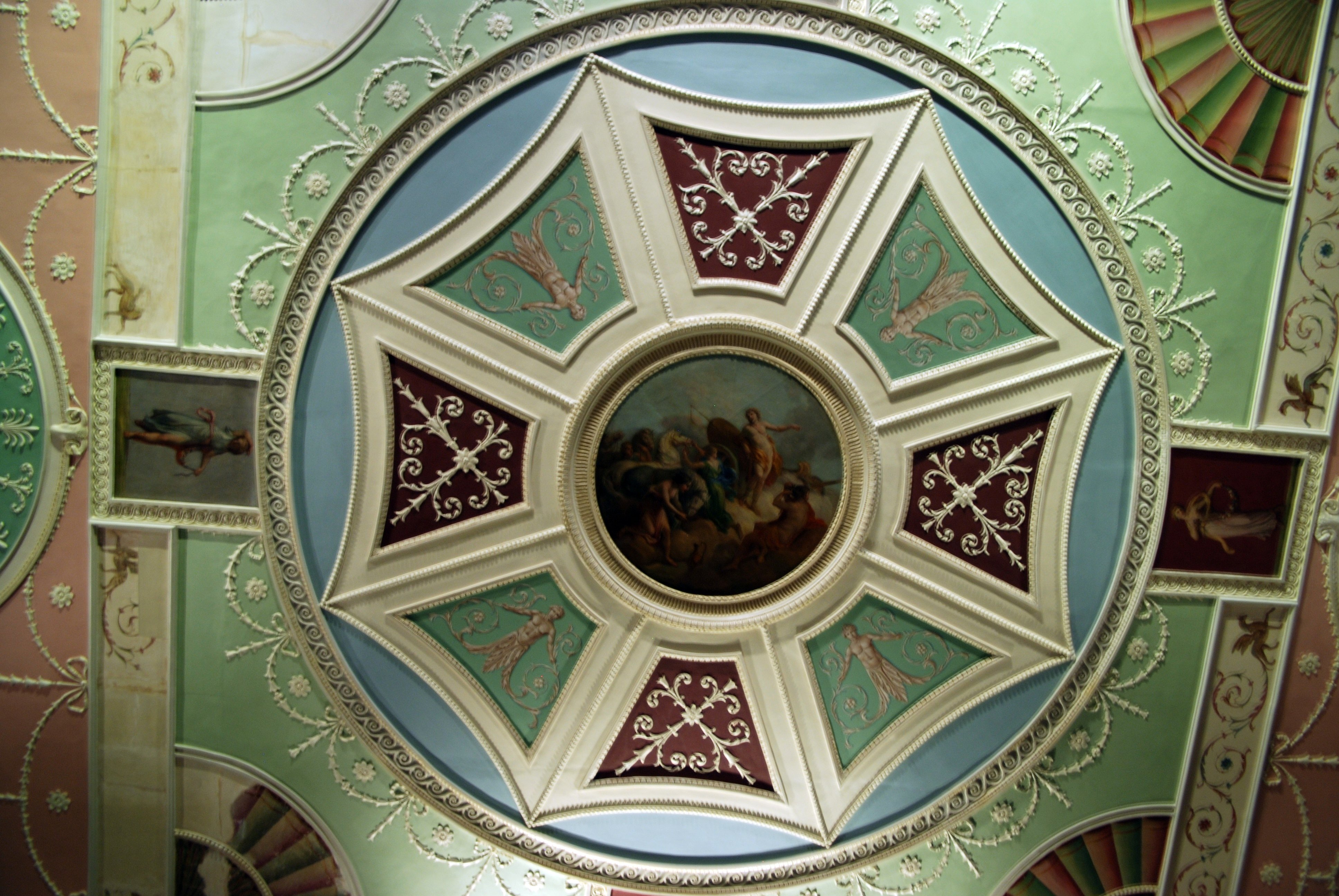
Robert Adam ceiling from the Adelphi, now in the V&A

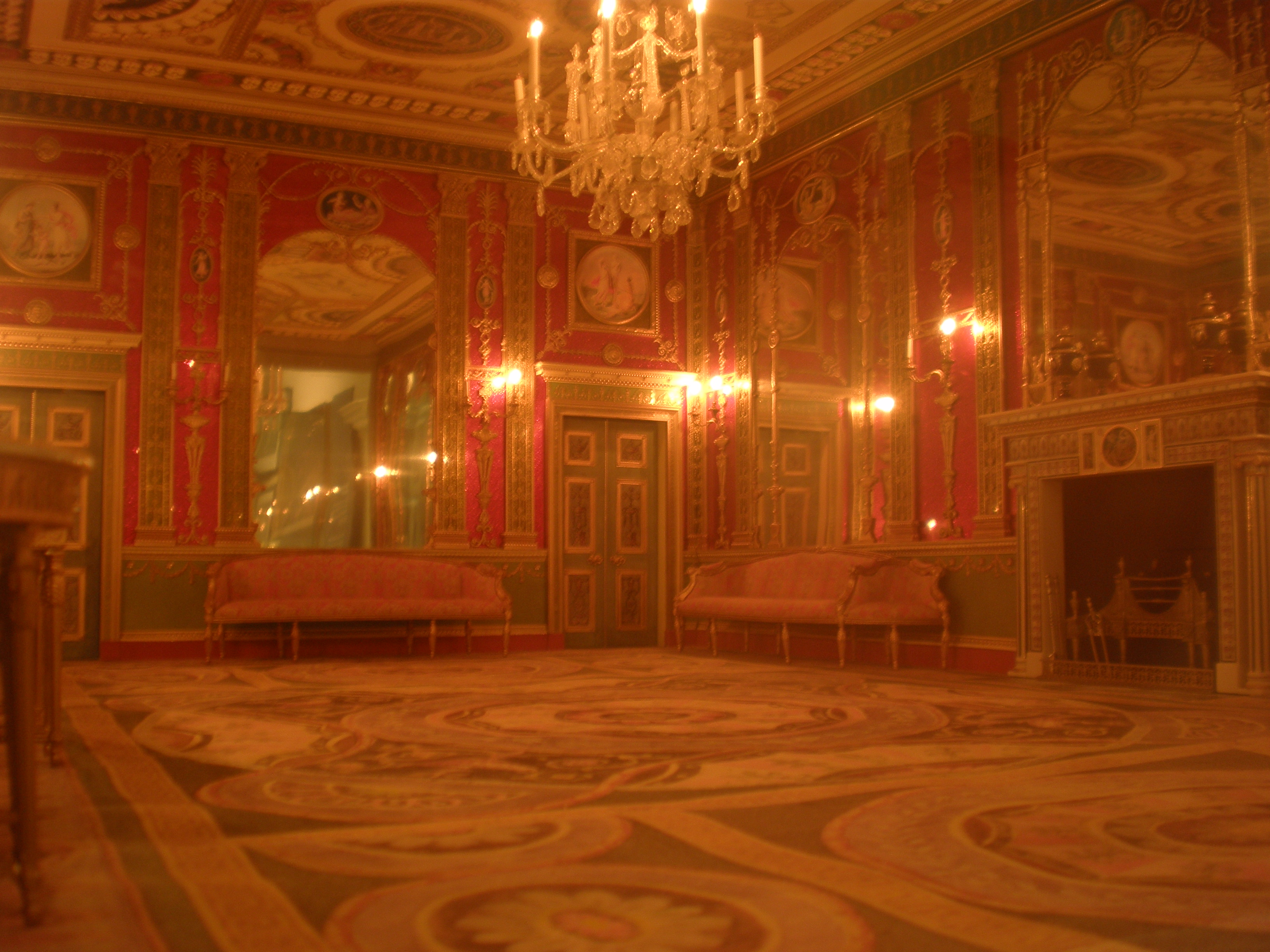
Model of the Glass Drawing Room Northumberland House, in the V&A

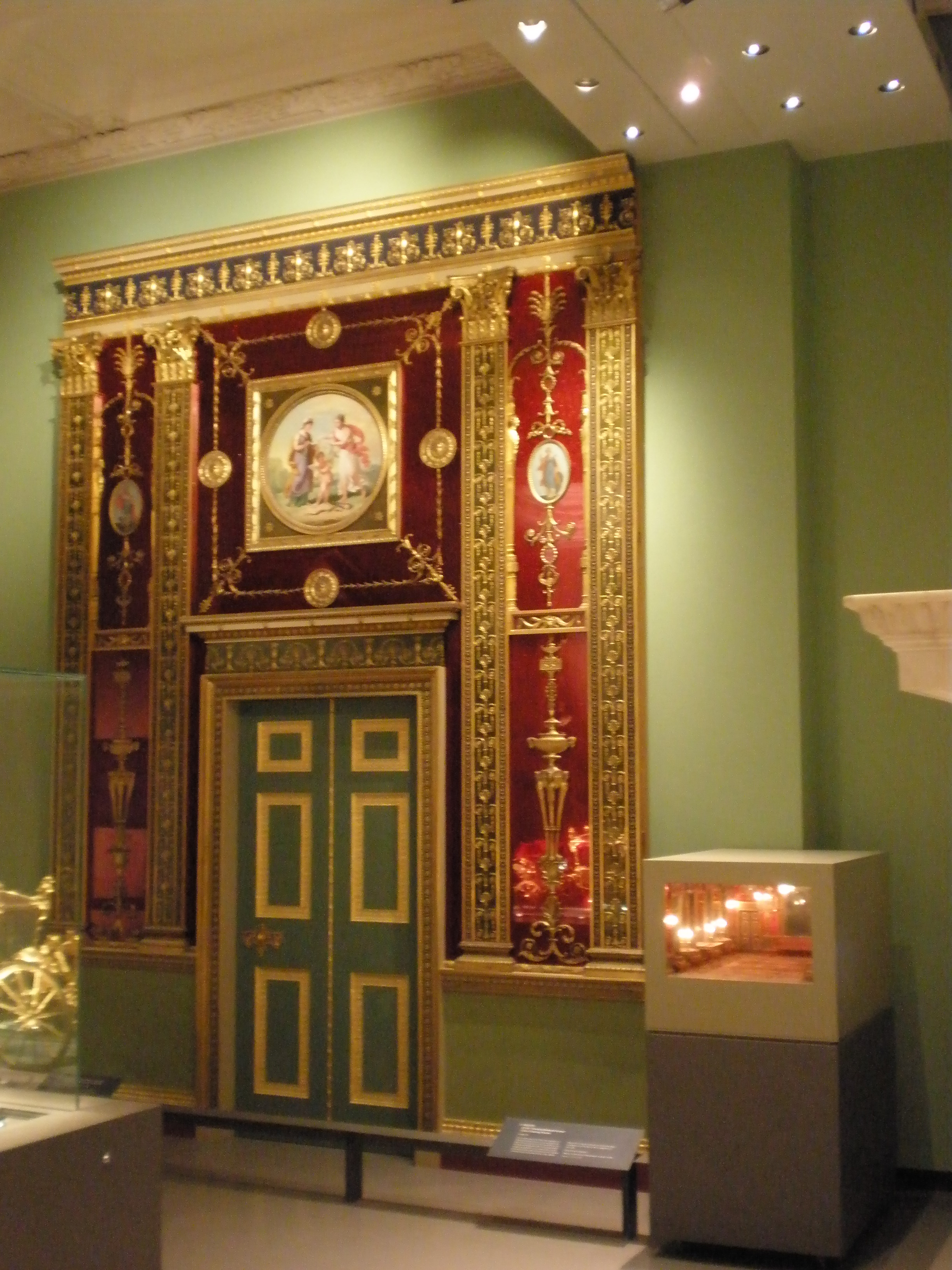
Panels from the Glass Drawing Room Northumberland House, in the V&A

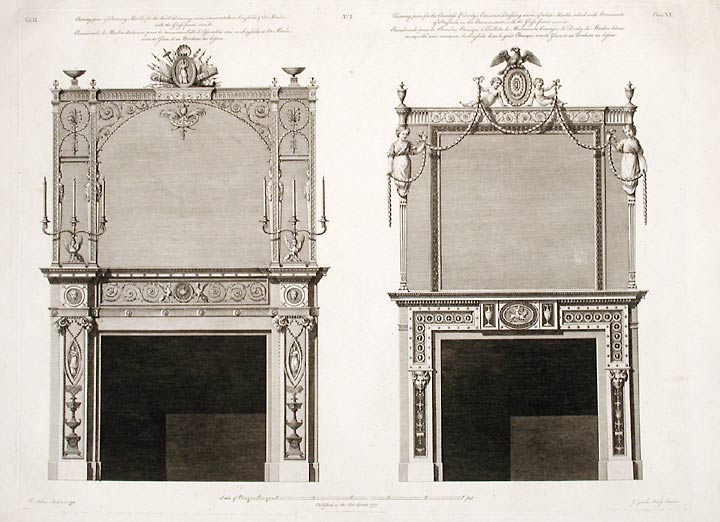
Design for fireplaces in the withdrawing room and the Countess of Derby's dressing room, Derby House

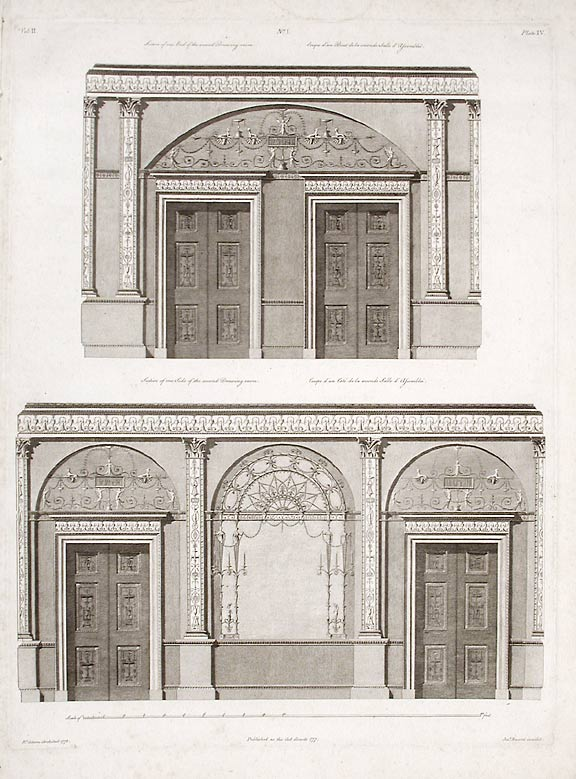
Drawing Room, Derby House

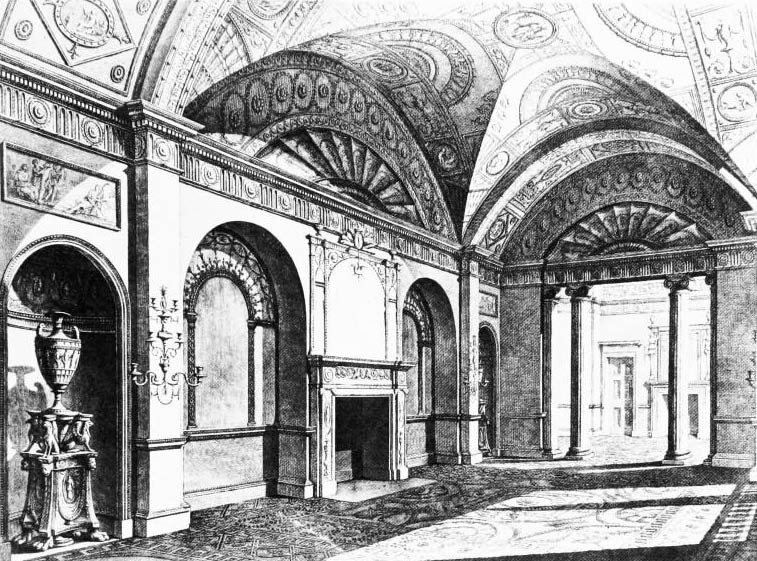
Drawing Room, Derby House

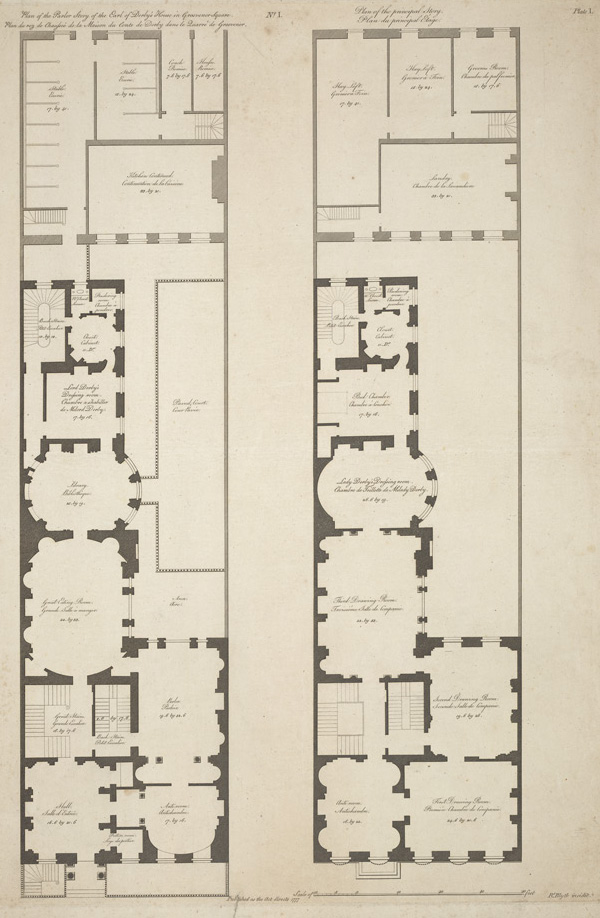
Plan, Derby House

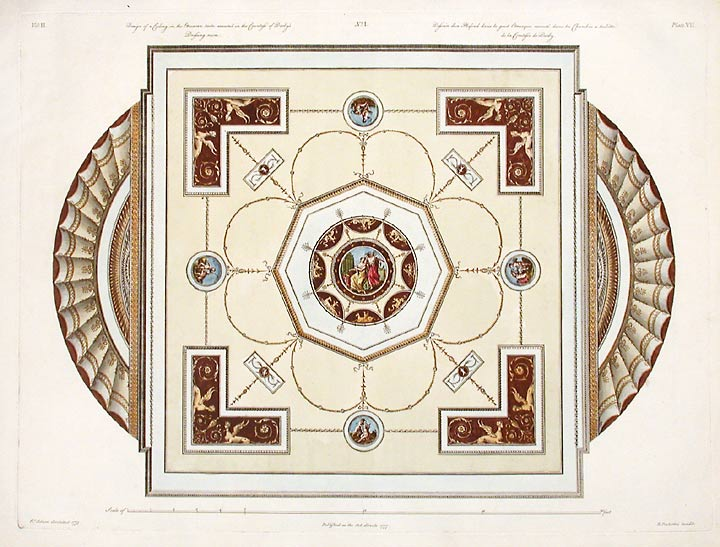
Ceiling, Countess of Derby's Dressing Room, Derby House

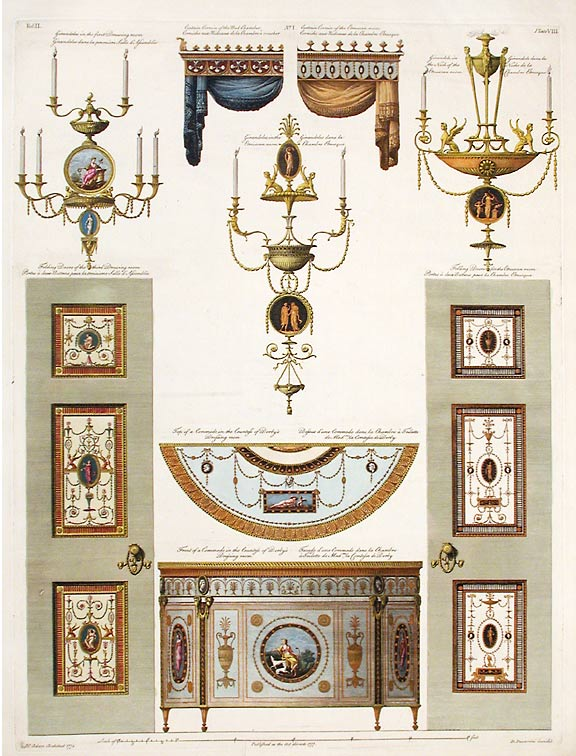
Details for Derby House in Grosvenor Square, an example of the Adam Brothers' decorative designs

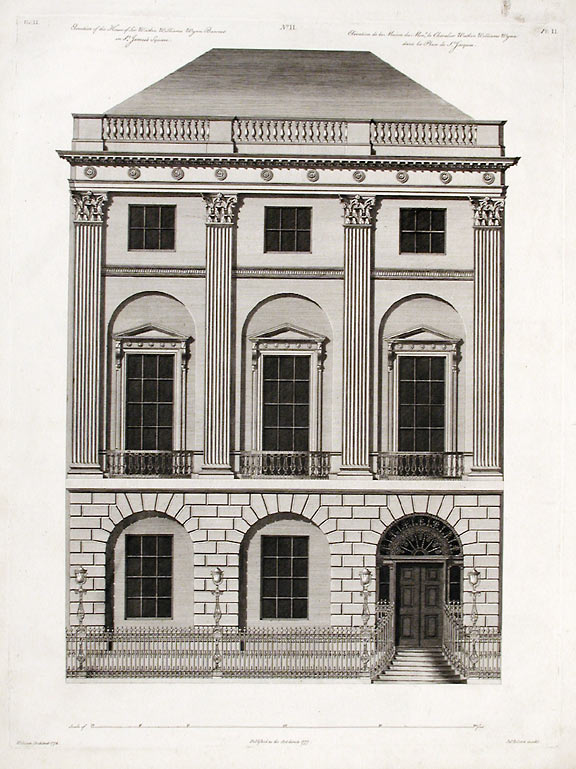
20 St. James's Square, London, front facade

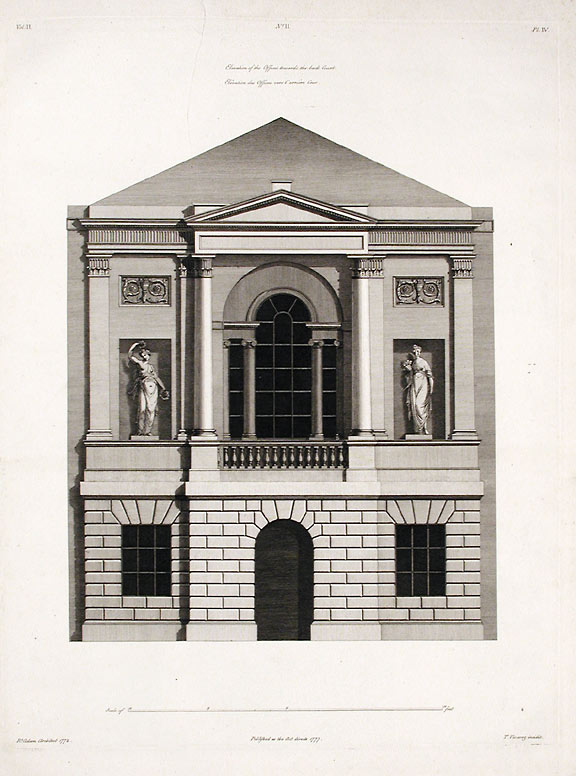
20 St. James's Square, London, rear facade

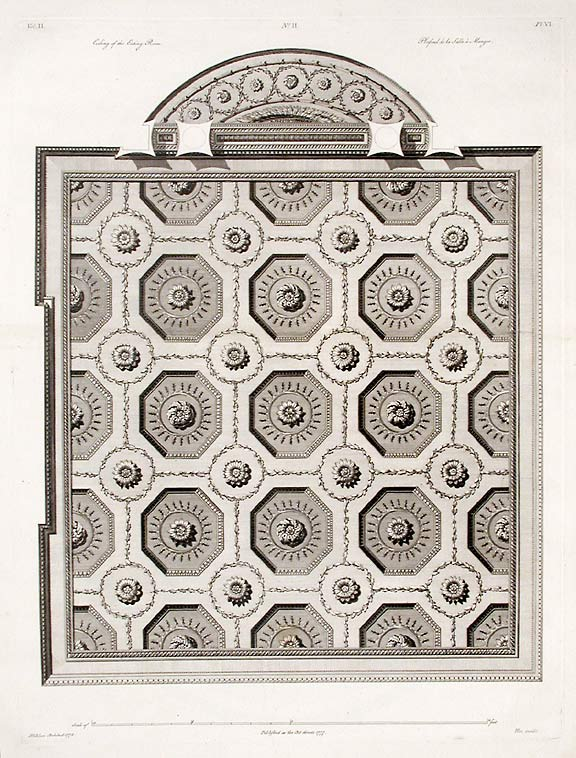
Dining Room ceiling, 20 St. James's Square, London

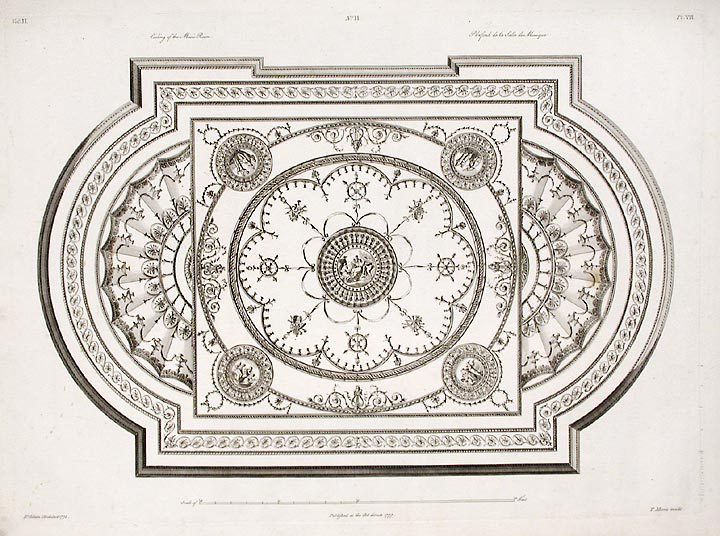
Music Room ceiling, 20 St. James's Square, London

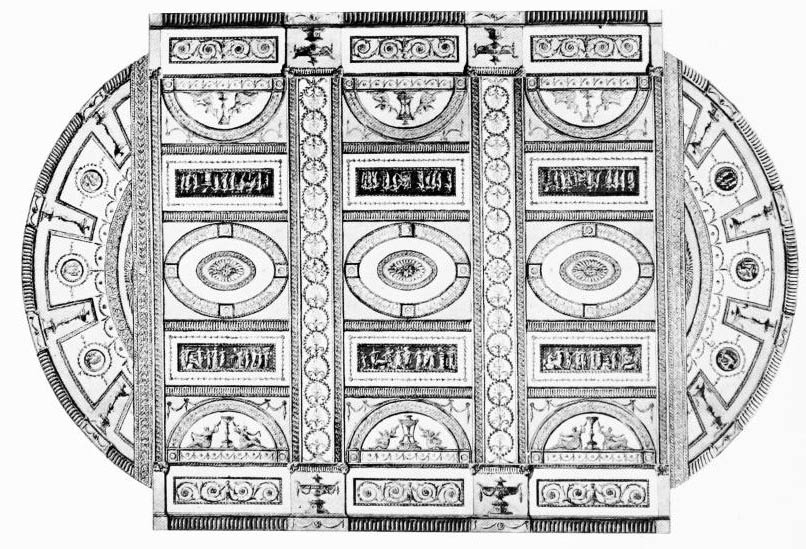
Drawing Room ceiling, 20 St. James's Square, London

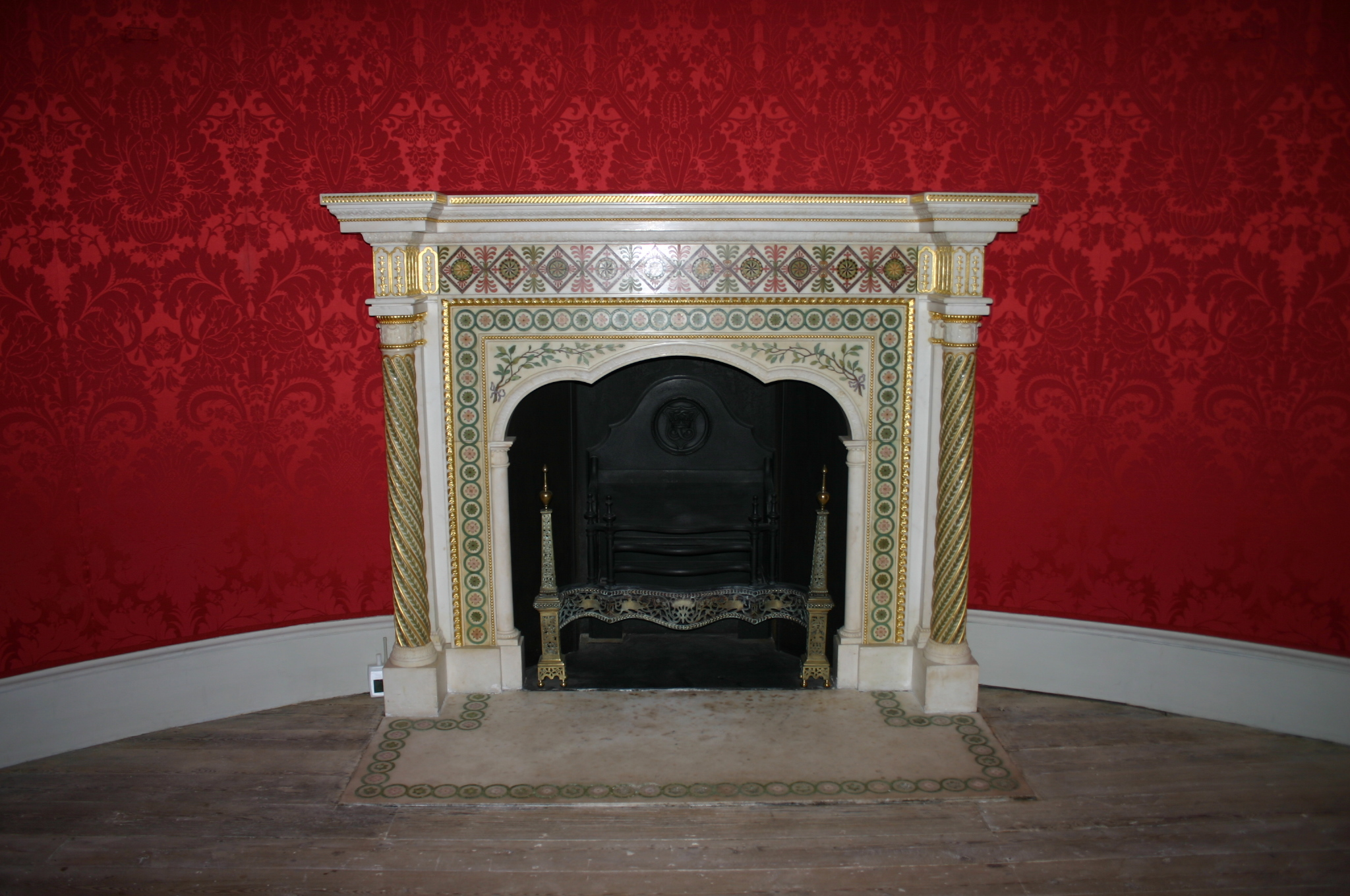
Fireplace, Round room, Strawberry Hill House, Middlesex

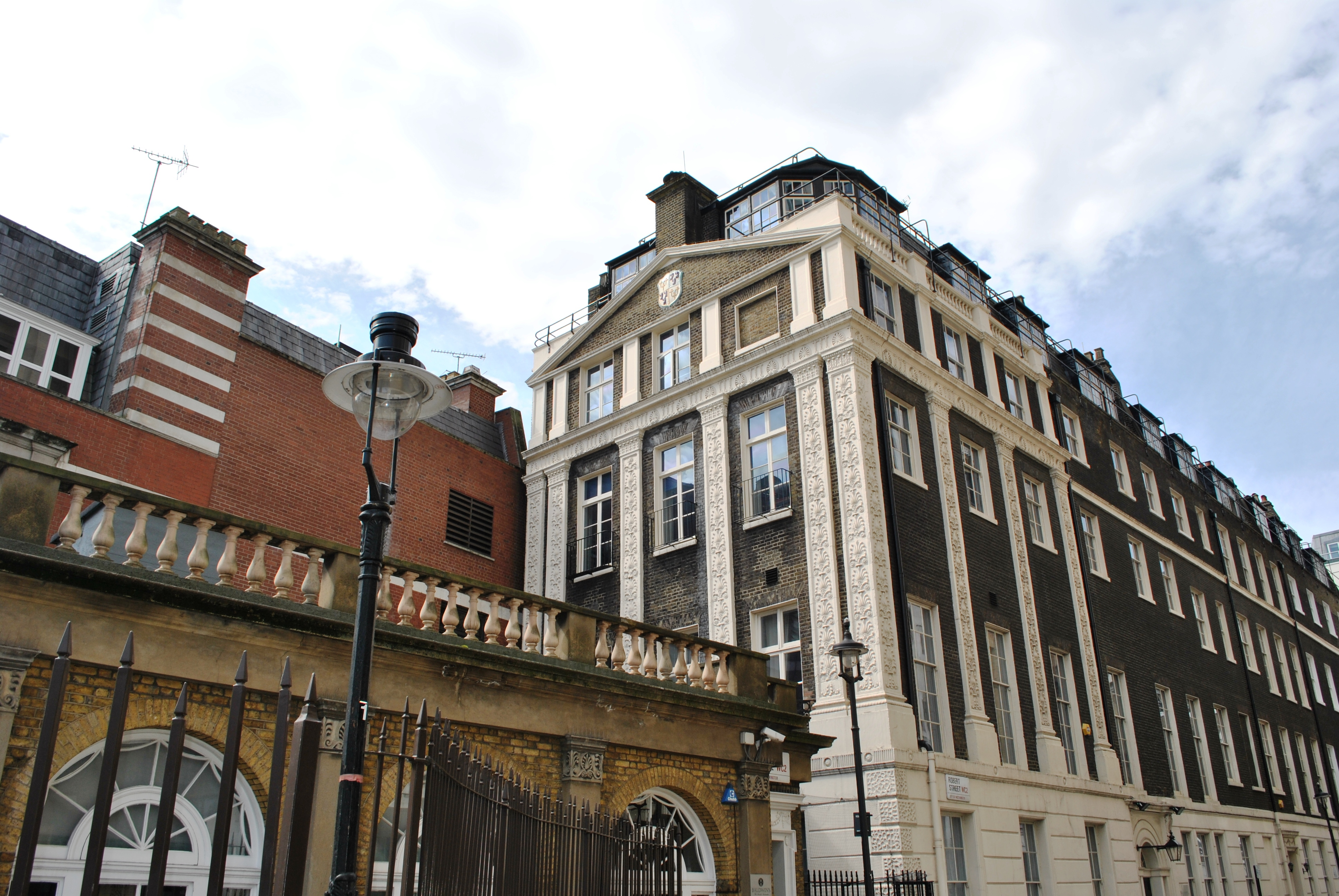
1-3 Robert Street

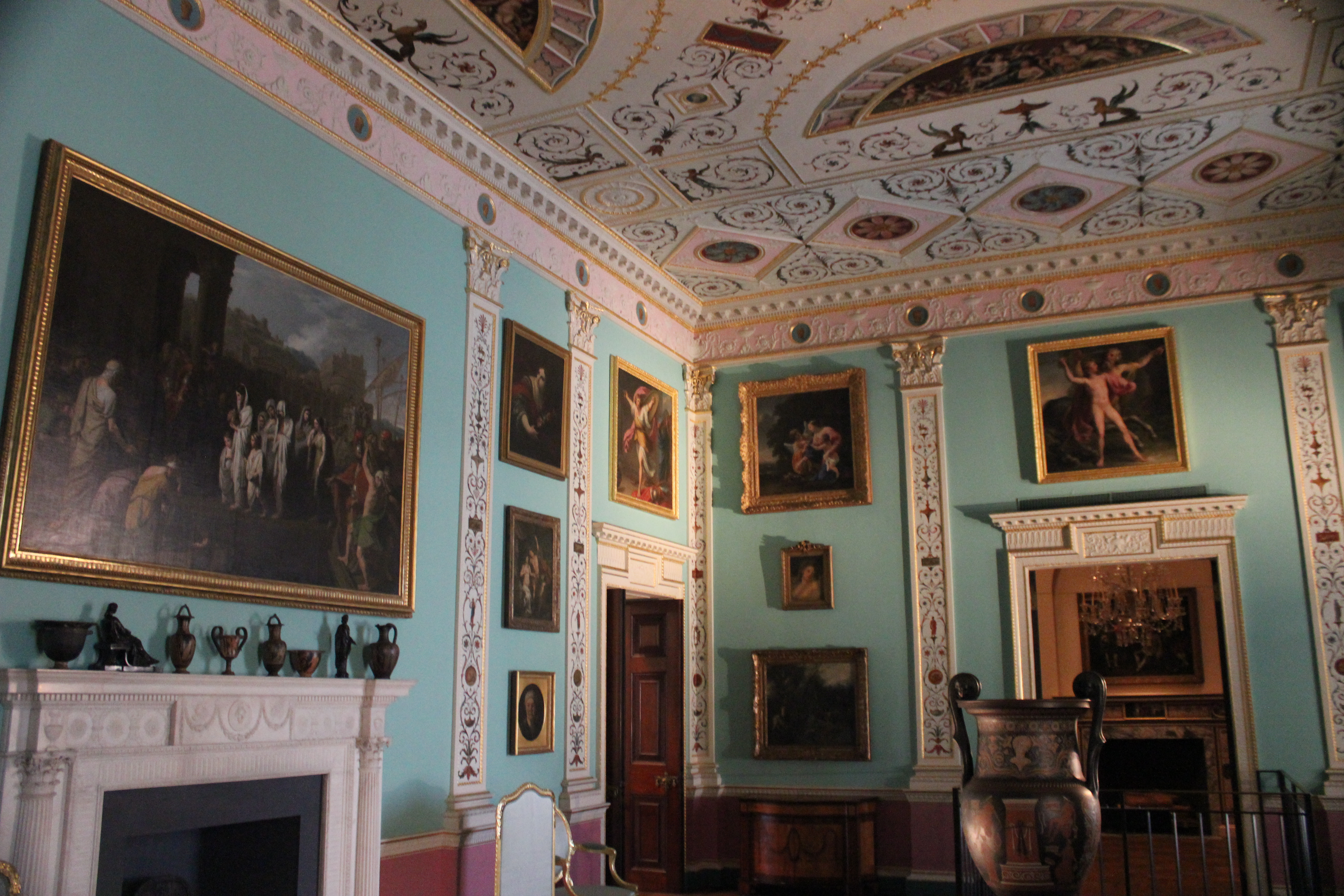
Lansdowne House Drawing Room, now in Philadelphia Art Museum

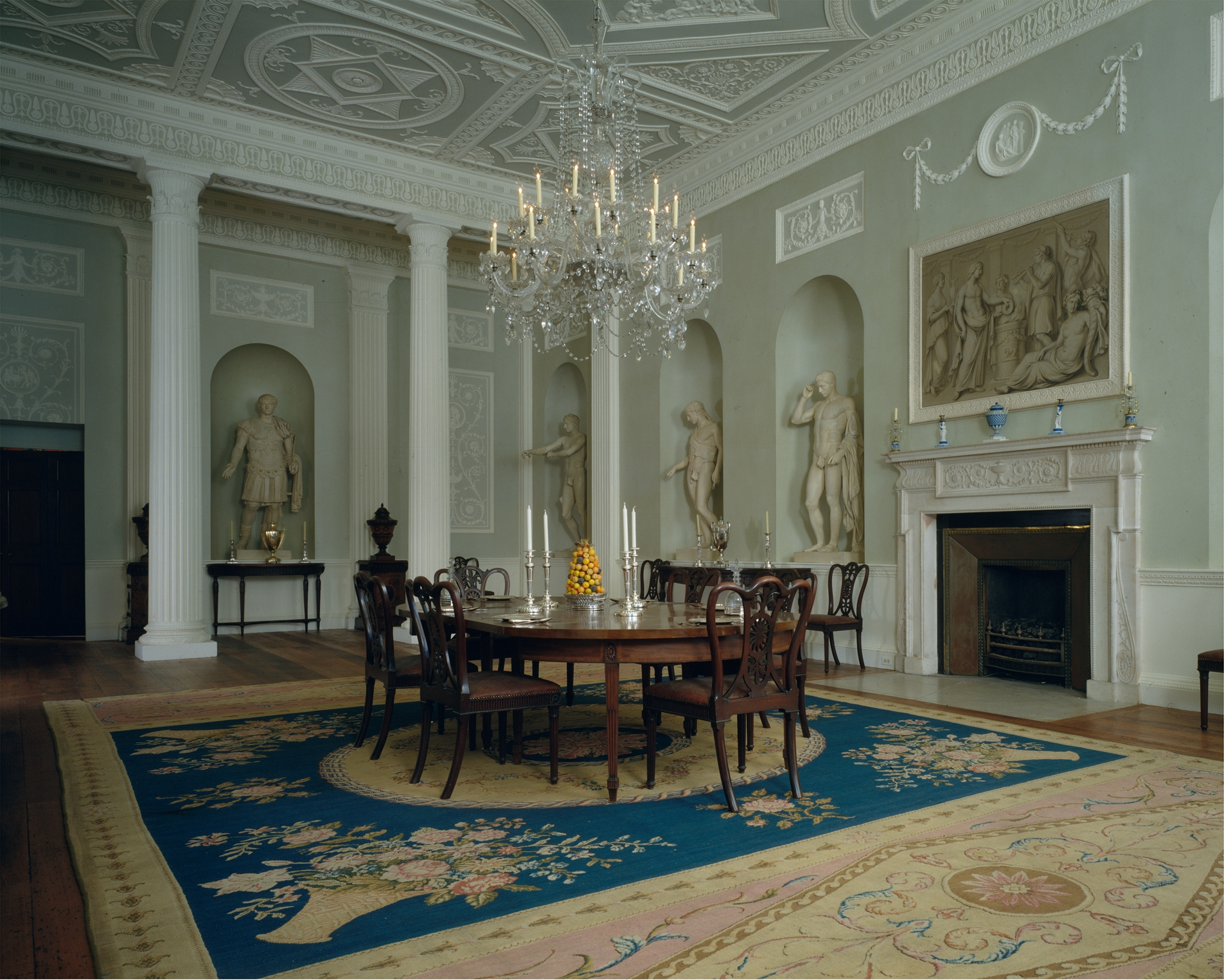
Lansdown House dining room, now in the Metropolitan Museum of Art, New York

=== Country houses with major work ===
- Dumfries House, Ayrshire (1754–1759)
- Hatchlands Park, Surrey, interiors (1756)
- Douglas Castle, Lanarkshire (1757–1761)
- Paxton House, near Berwick-upon-Tweed (1758)
- Shardeloes, Amersham, Buckinghamshire (altered and completed the original design by Stiff Leadbetter) (1759–63)
- Harewood House, West Yorkshire (1759–1771)
- Kedleston Hall, near Derby (1759–1765)
- Mellerstain House, Kelso, Scottish Borders (1760–1768)
- Ugbrooke, Devon
- Osterley Park, west London (1761–1780)
- Mersham le Hatch, Mersham, Ashford, Kent (1762–1766)
- Syon House interior, Brentford (1762–1769)
- Luton Hoo, Bedfordshire (1766–1770) later extensively reconstructed 1816 by Robert Smirke and other architects later
- Nostell Priory (1766–80)
- Newby Hall, Newby Boroughbridge, North Yorkshire (1767–76)
- Kenwood House, Hampstead, London (1768)
- Saltram House, Plymouth, Devon (1768–69)
- Bowood House, near Calne, Wiltshire, Diocletian wing, and other interiors (1770)
- Wedderburn Castle, Duns, Scottish Borders, Berwickshire (1770–1778)
- Culzean Castle, South Ayrshire (1772–1790)
- Moreton Hall, Suffolk (1773–1776), building and interiors
- Stowe, Buckinghamshire (1774)
- Moreton Hall, Bury St Edmund (1783)
- Brasted Place, Kent (c. 1783)
- Pitfour Castle, Tayside, attributed (c. 1785–90)
- Seton Castle, East Lothian (1789)
- Newliston, Lothian (1789)
- Dalquharran Castle, South Ayrshire (1789–1792); now a ruin
- Airthrey Castle, Stirlingshire (1790–1791)
- Balbardie House, Lothian (1792); demolished
- Gosford House, near Longniddry, East Lothian (1790–1800)
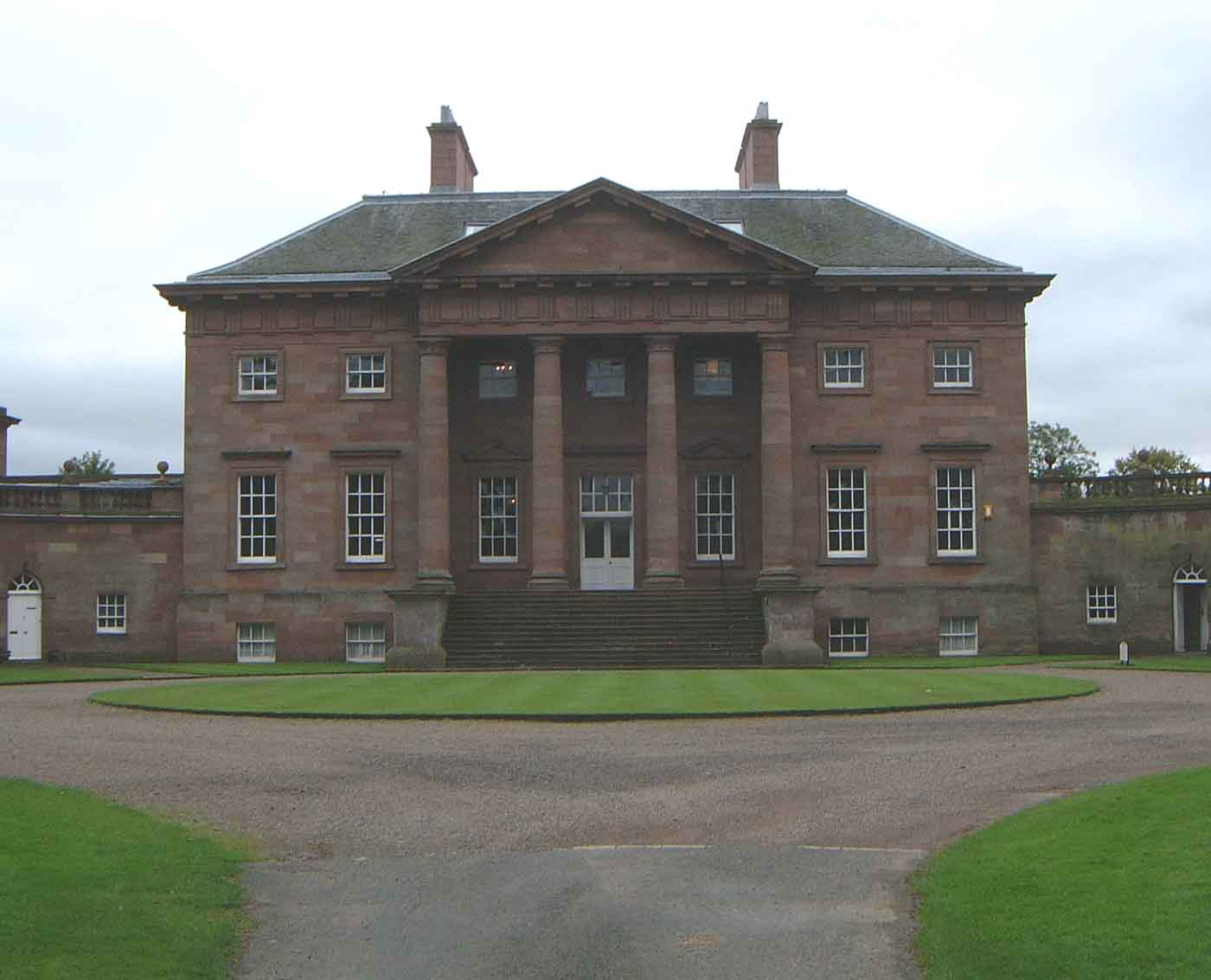
Paxton House, Berwickshire

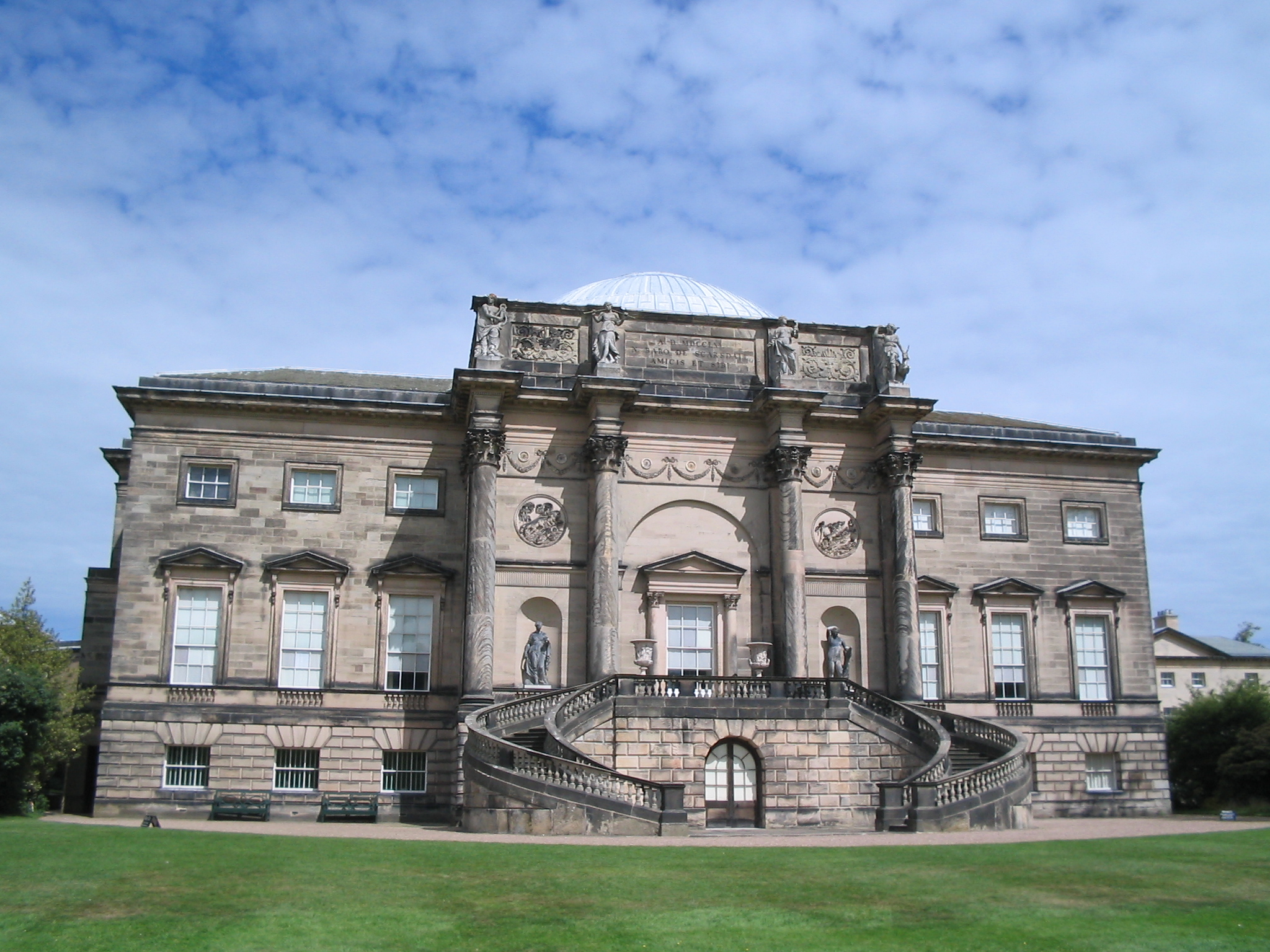
South front, Kedleston Hall

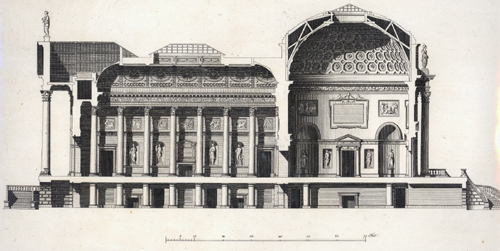
Cross section, Kedleston Hall

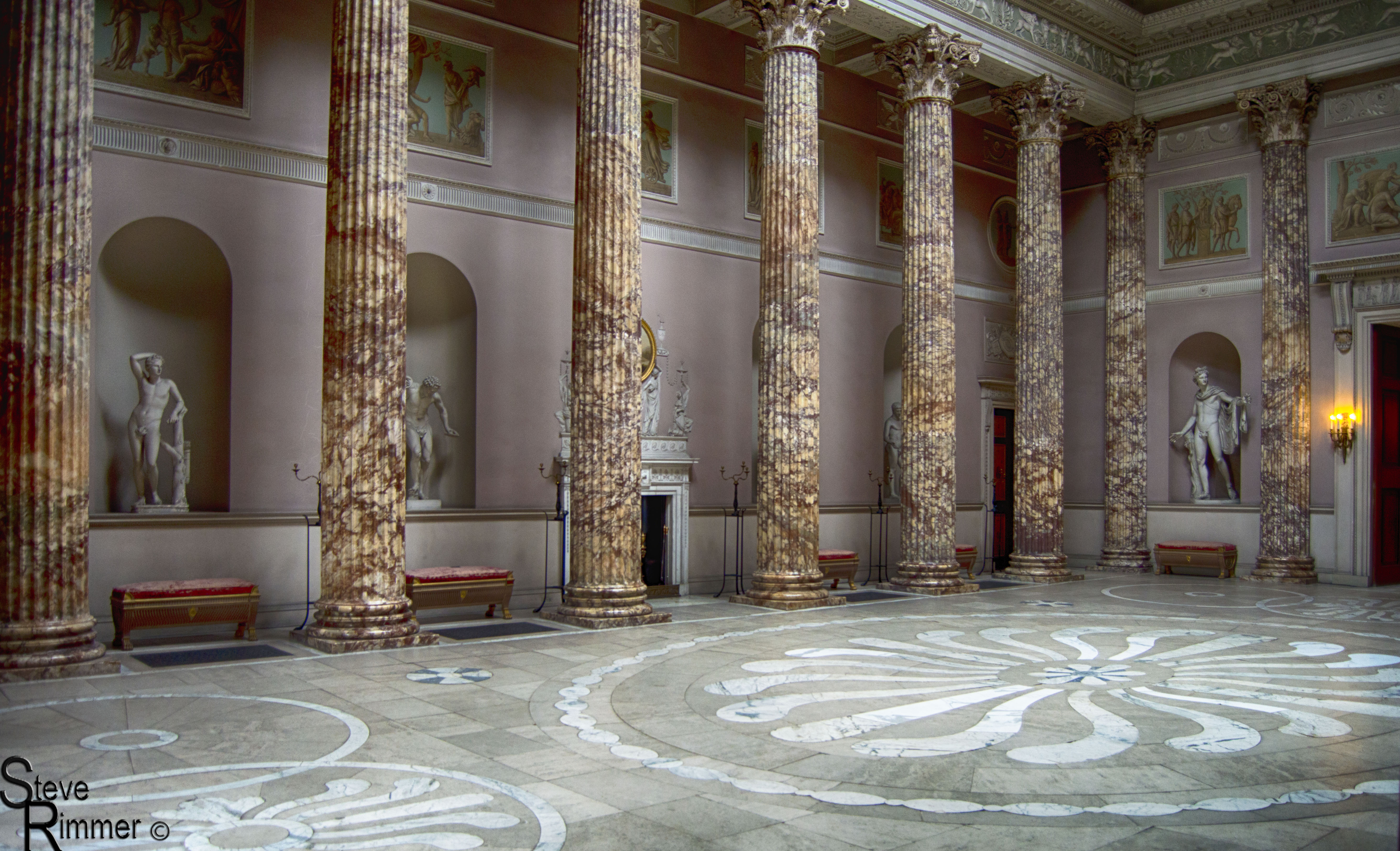
Kedleston Hall, Marble Hall

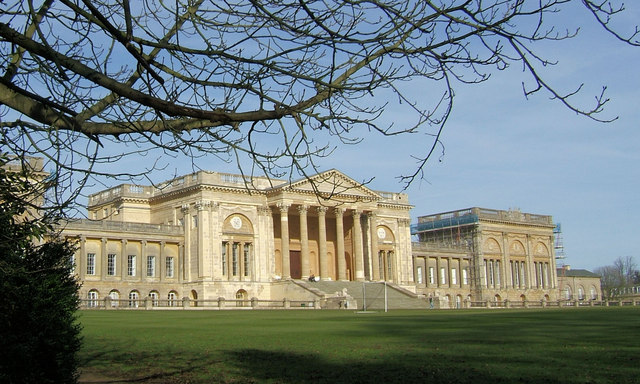
South front, Stowe House, slightly modified in execution

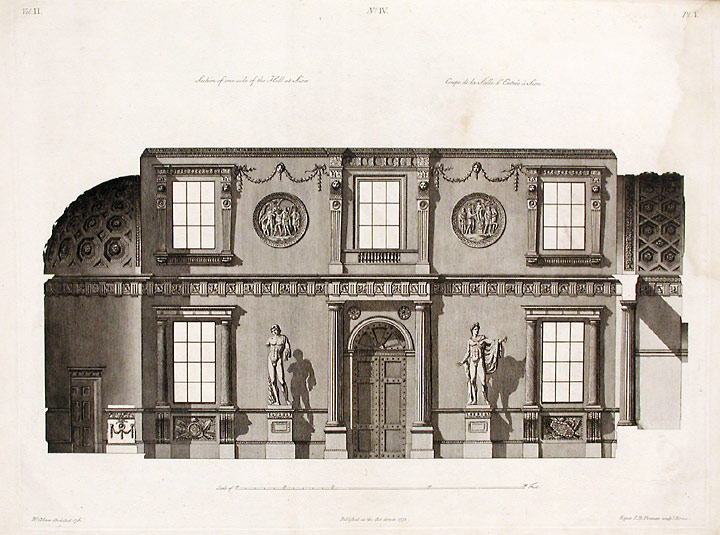
Cross section of Hall, Syon House, London

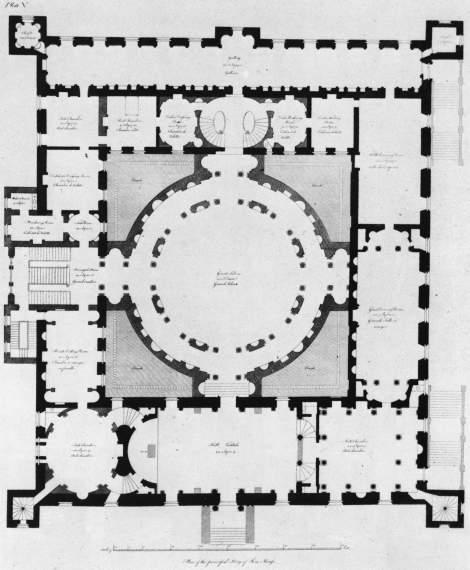
Plan, Syon House, London

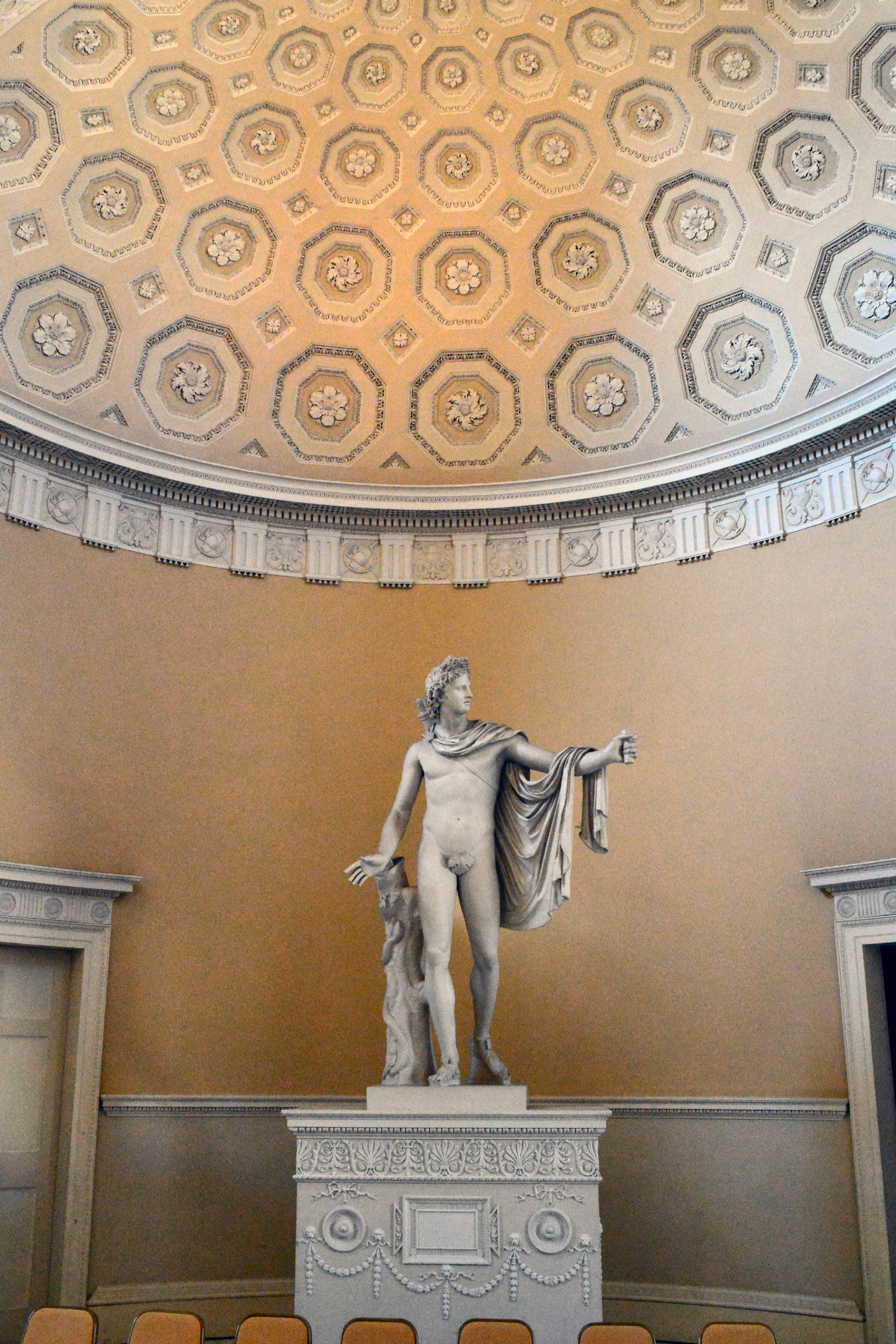
Apse, Entrance Hall, Syon House

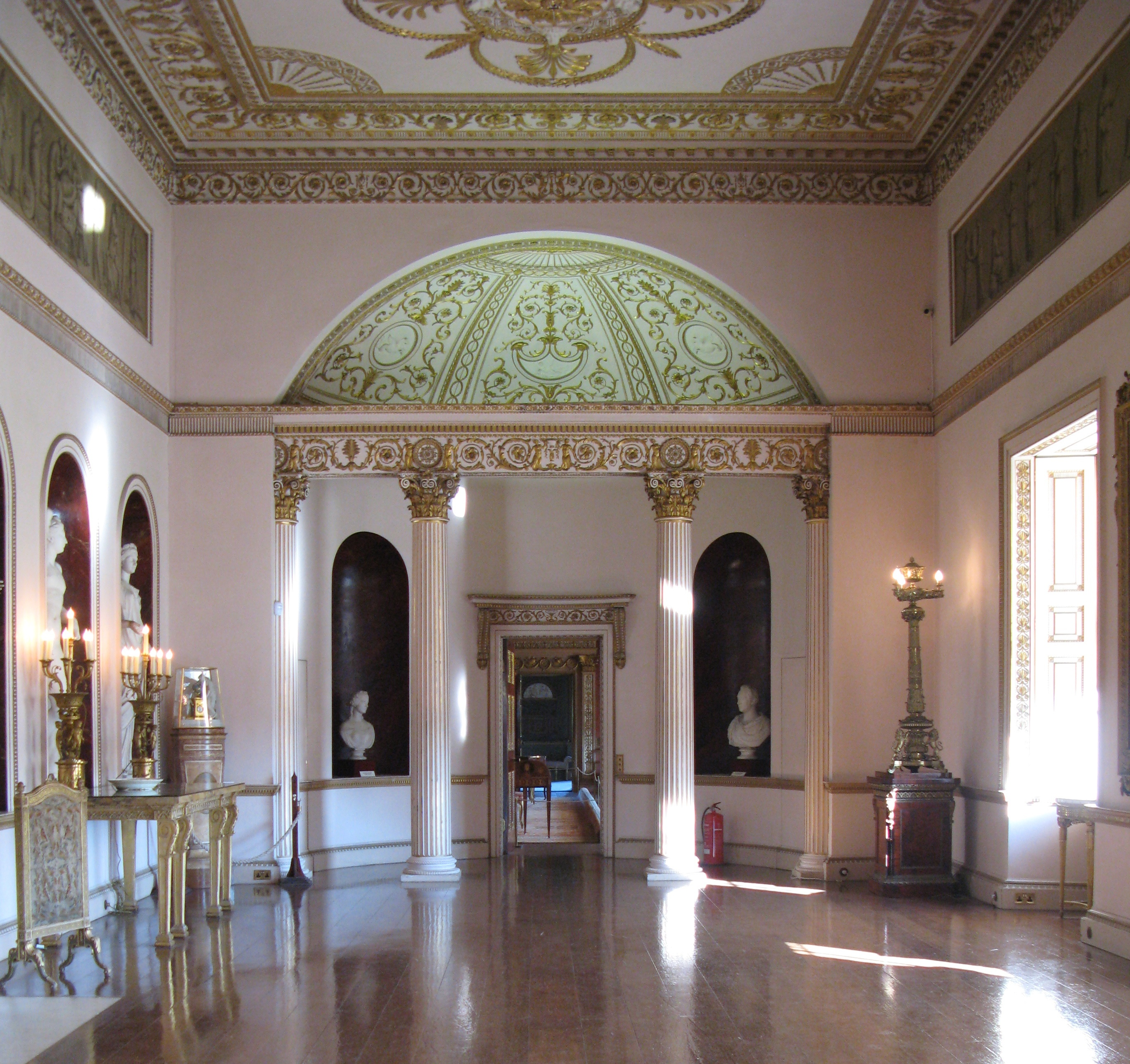
The Dining Room, Syon House

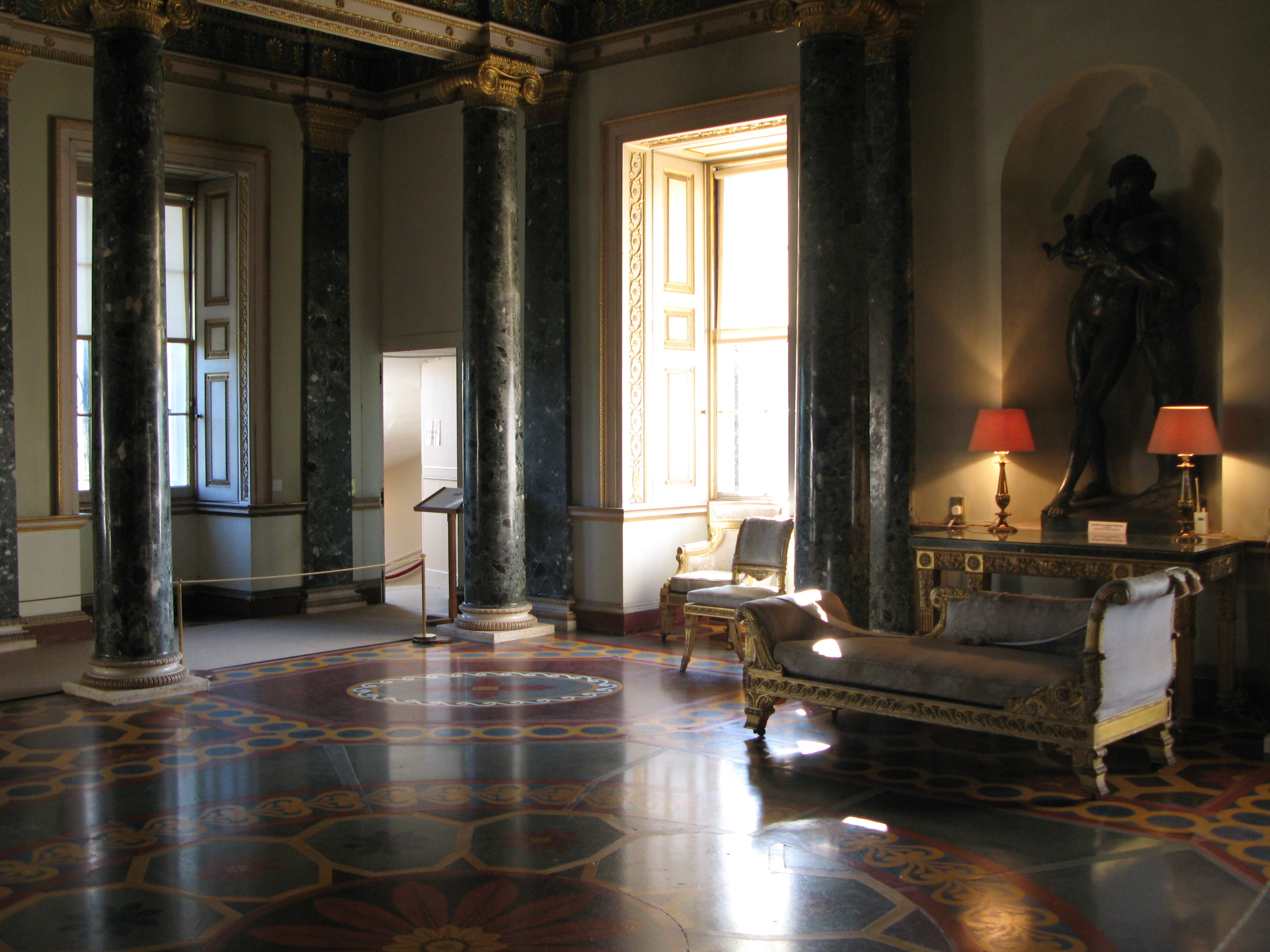
The Ante-Room, Syon House

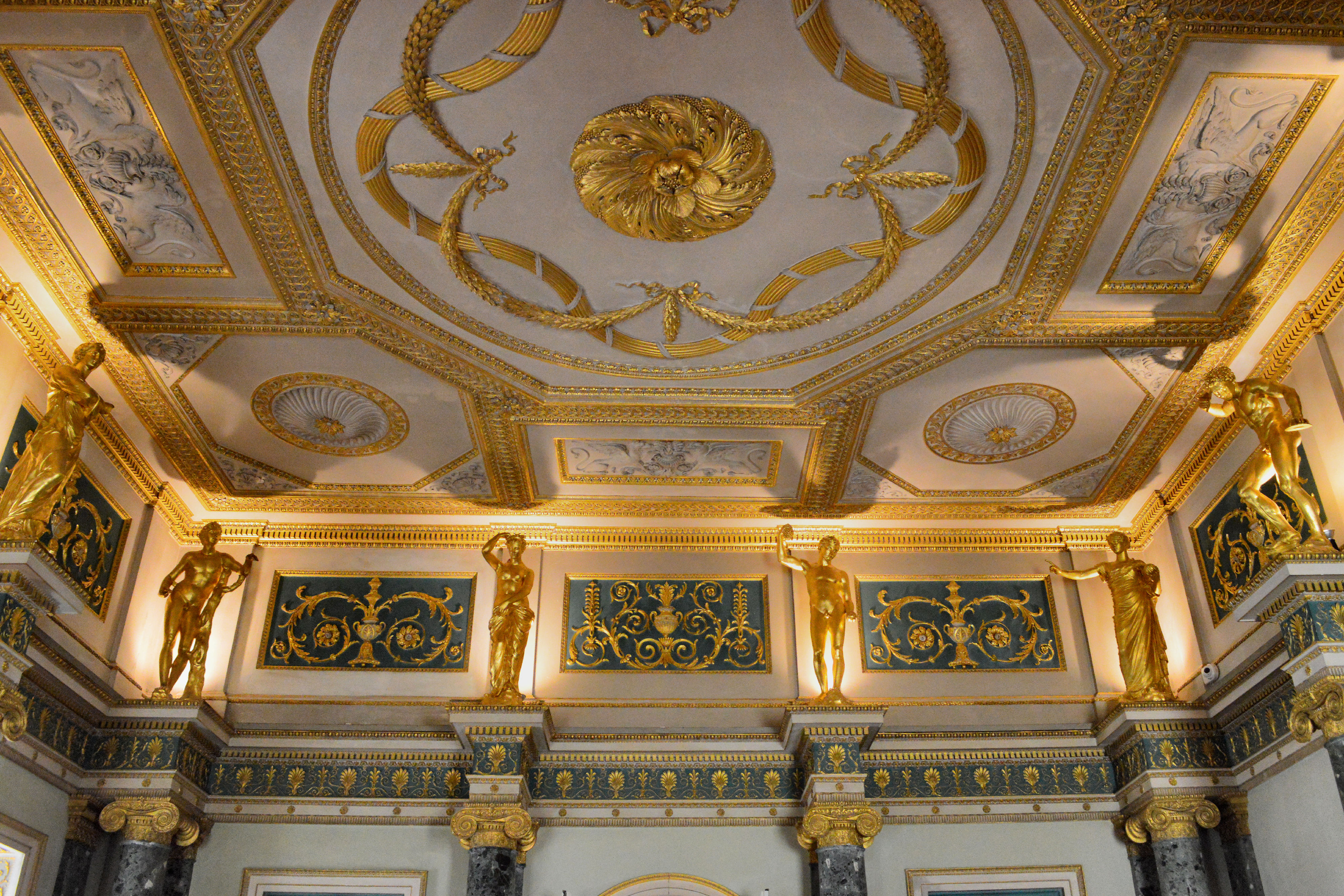
The ceiling, Ante-Room, Syon House

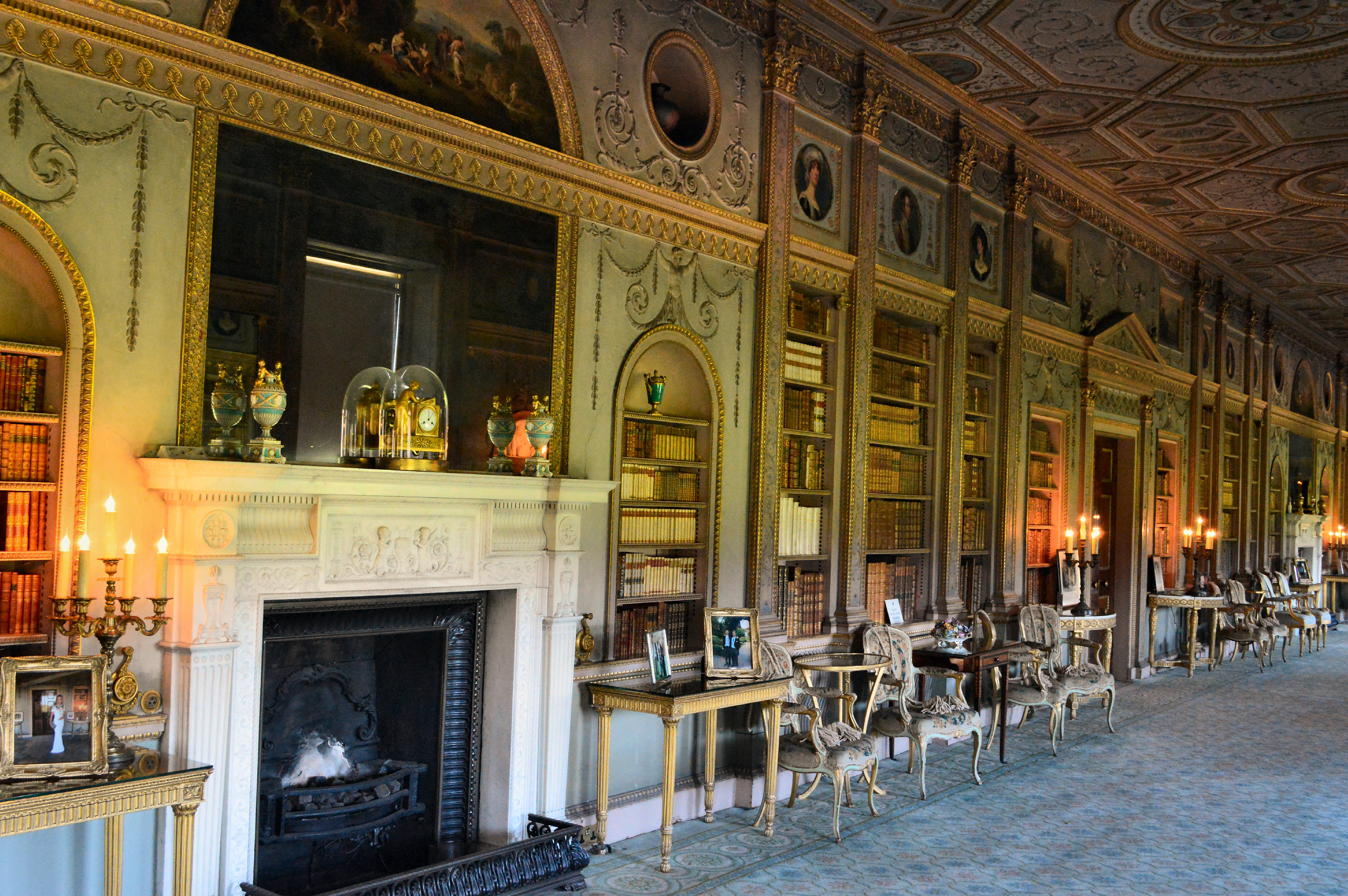
Long Gallery, Syon House

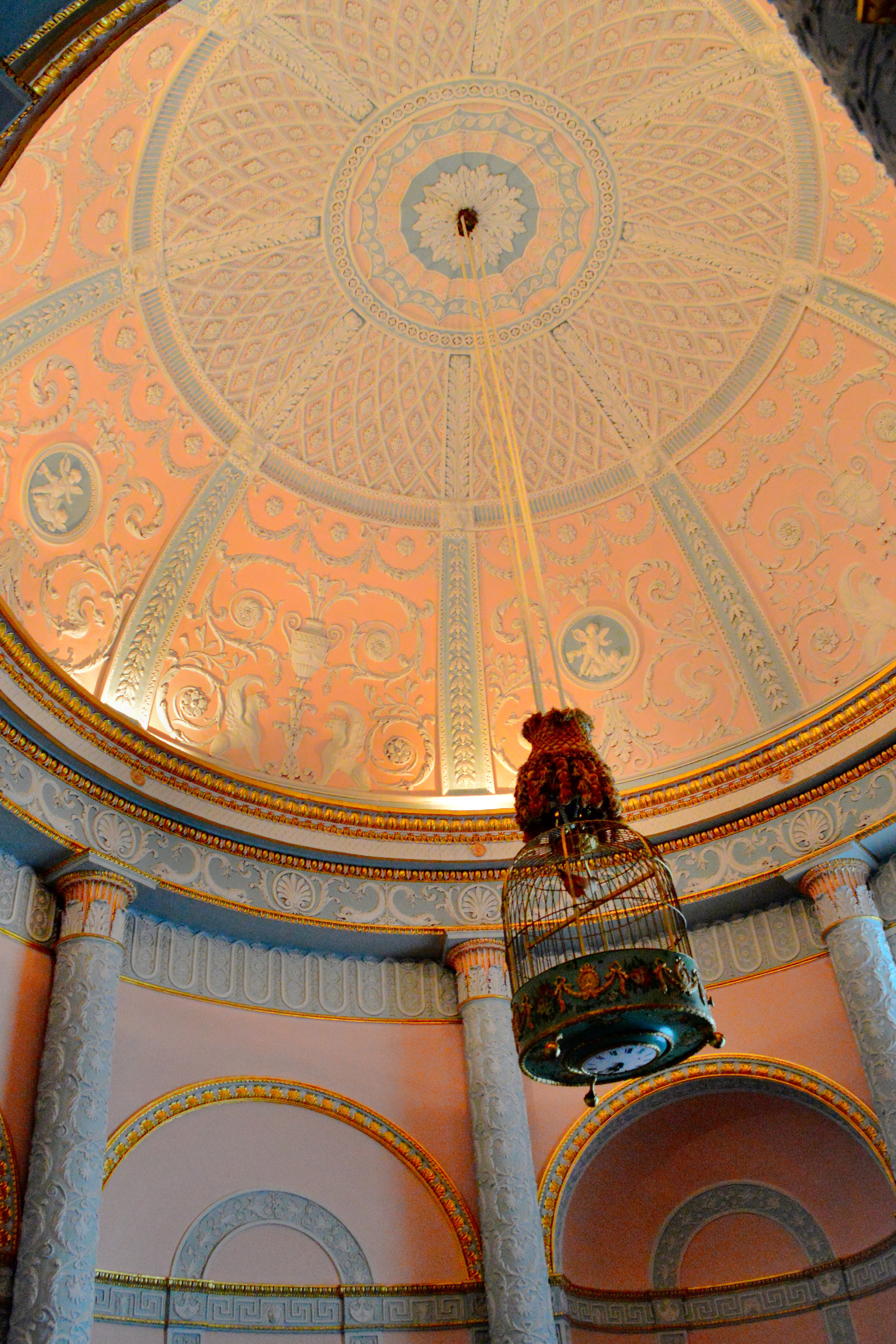
Closet off Long Gallery, Syon House

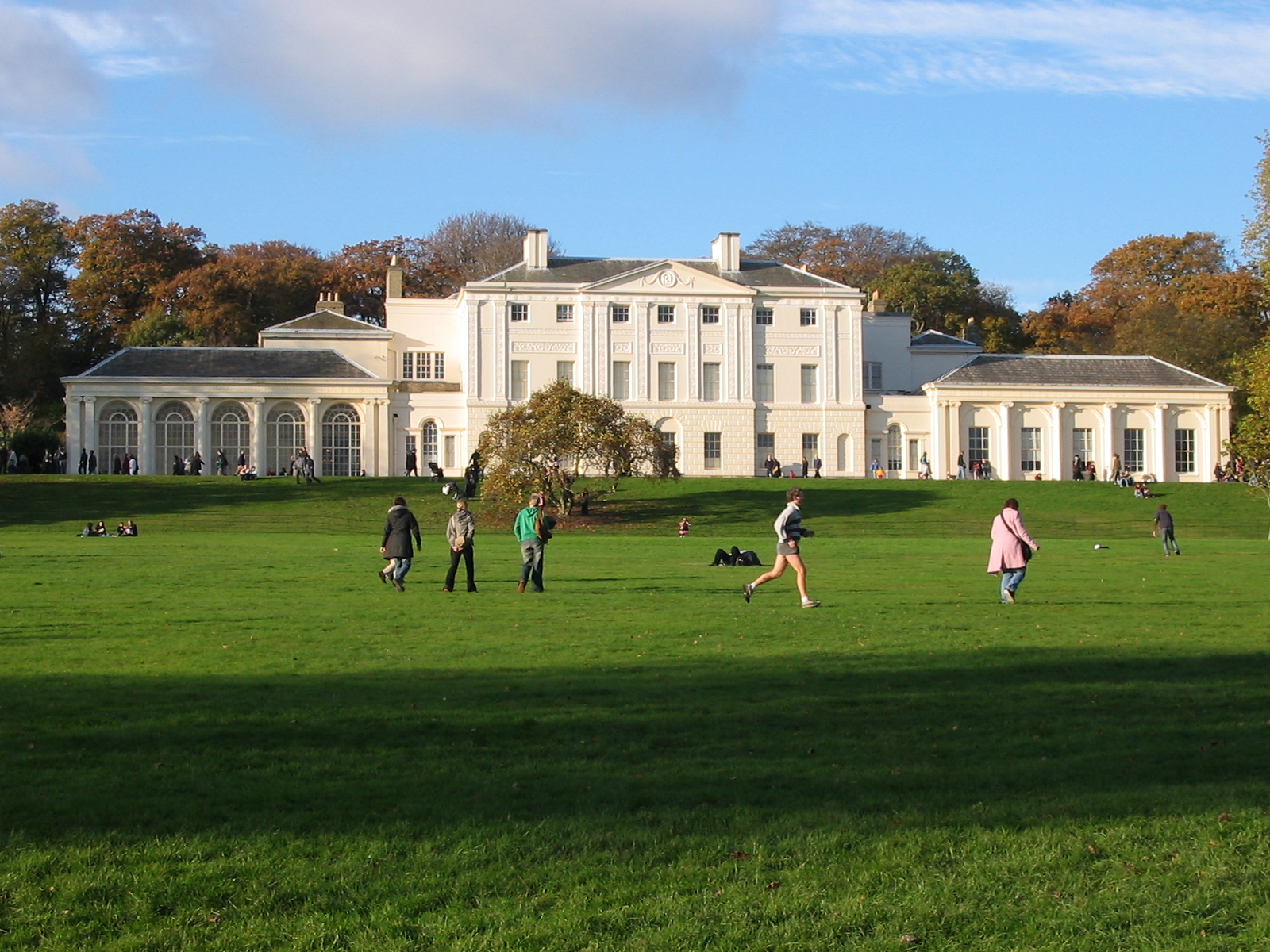
Kenwood House, London

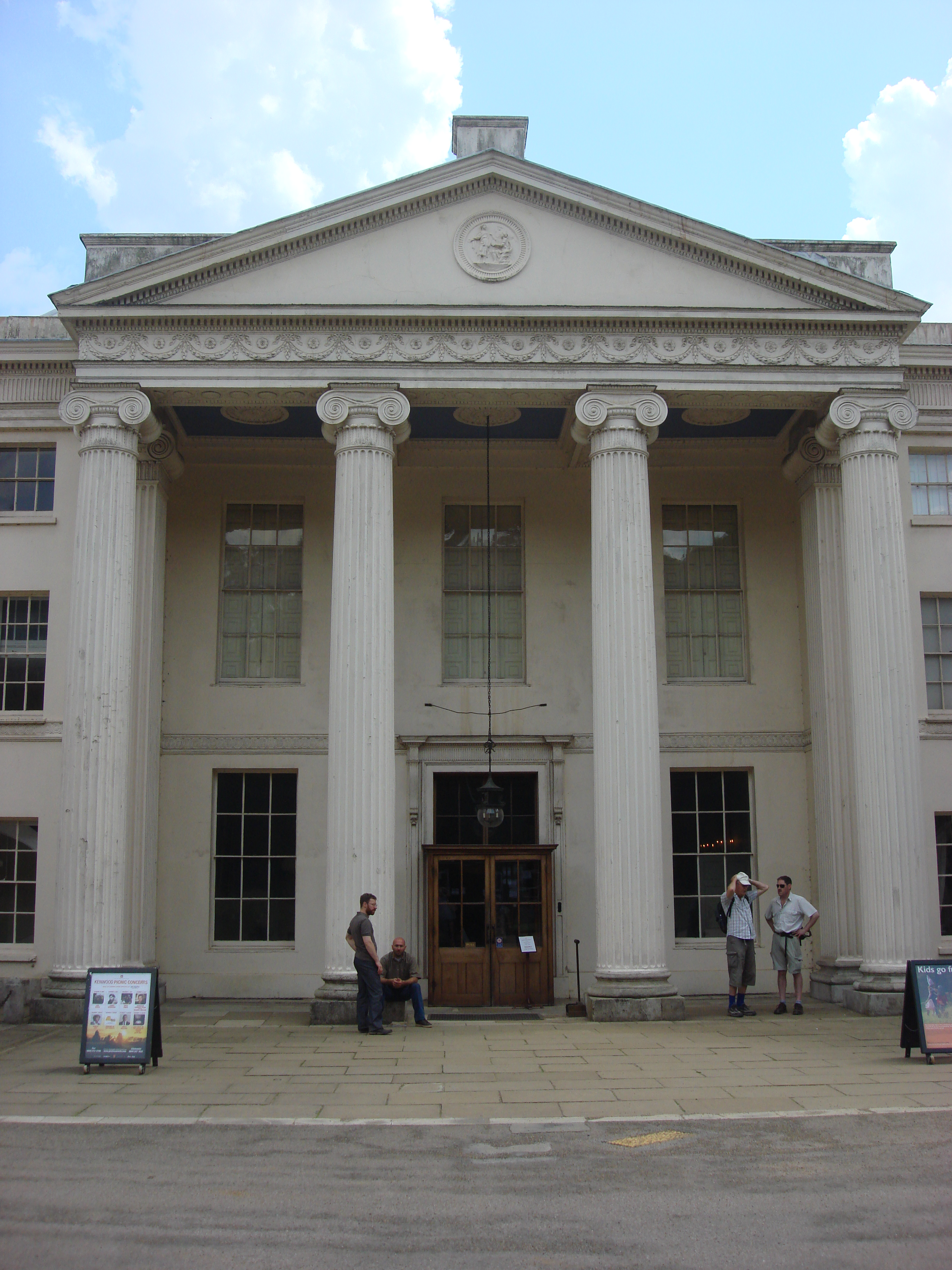
Entrance portico, Kenwood House, London

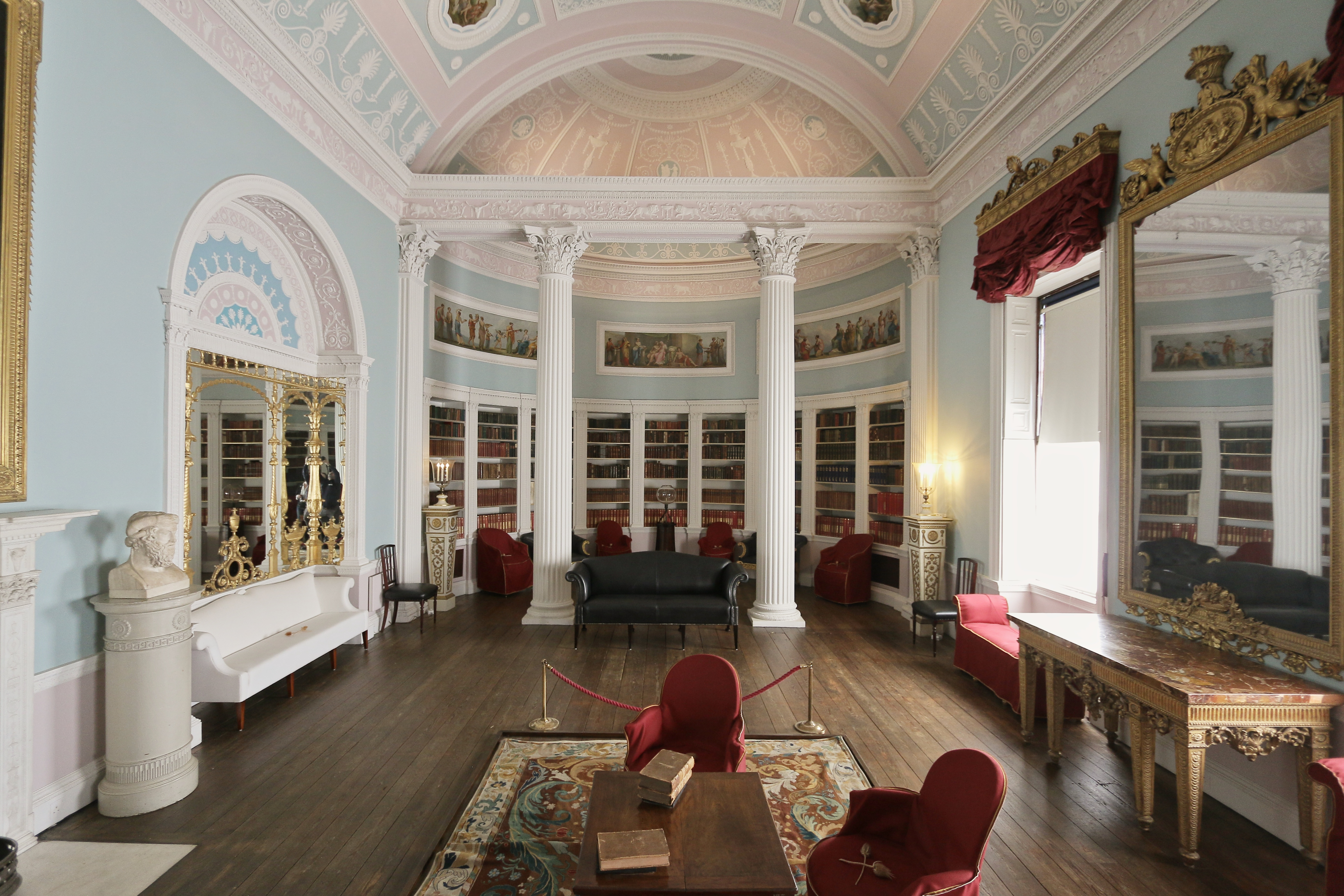
Kenwood House, Library

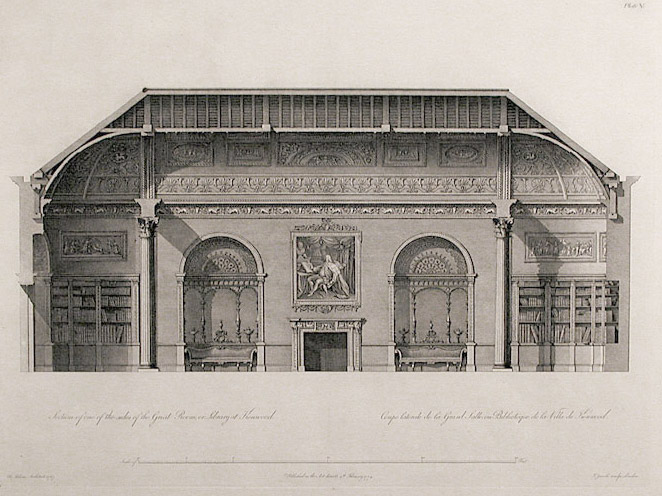
Cross section of the library, Kenwood House, London

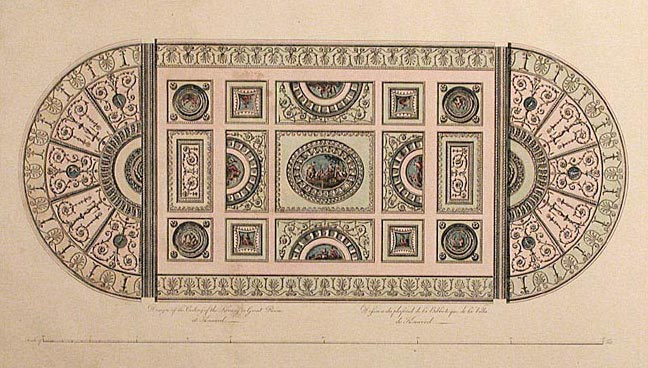
The library ceiling, Kenwood House, London

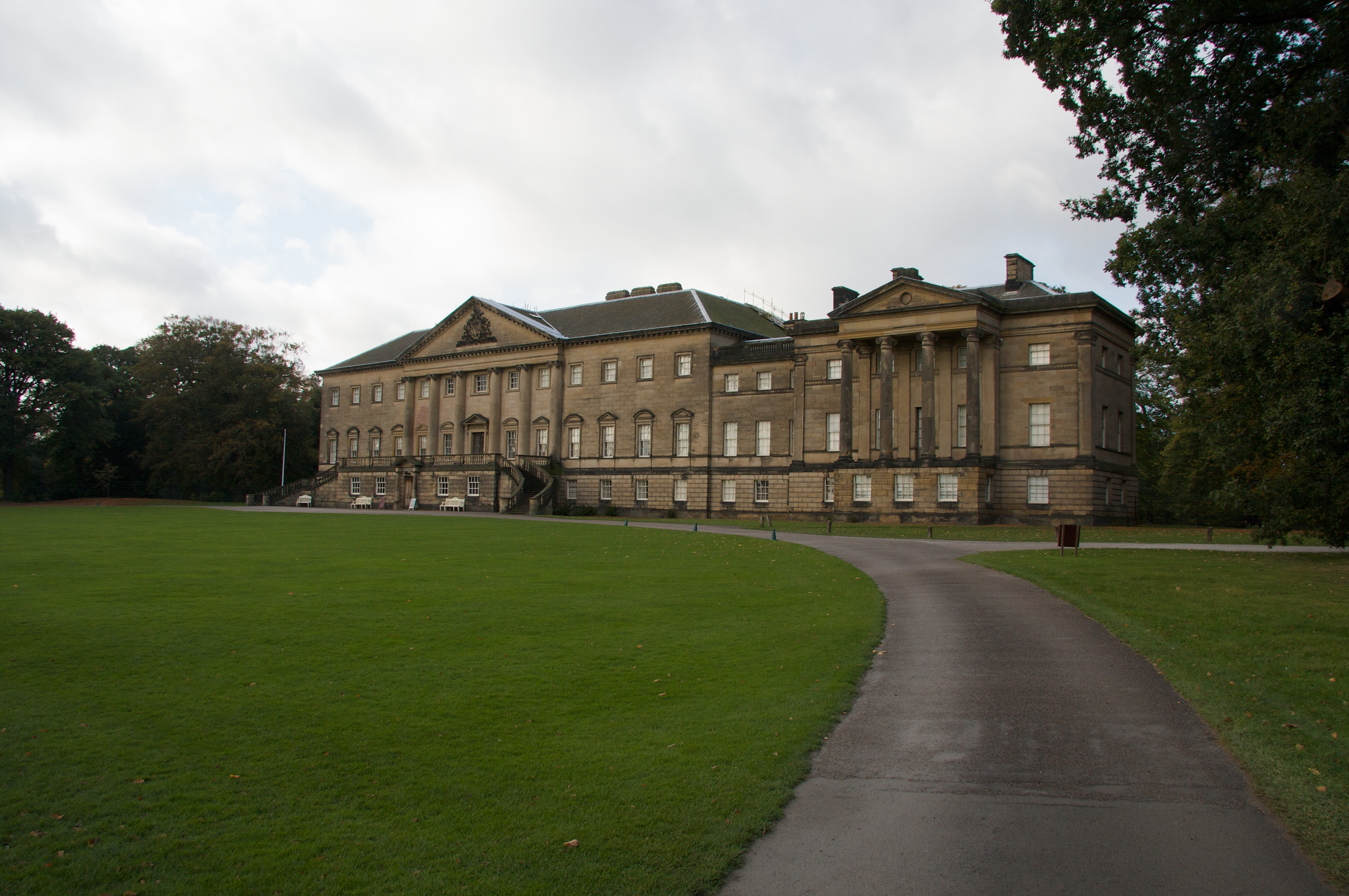
Nostell Priory, Yorkshire, Adam wing on right

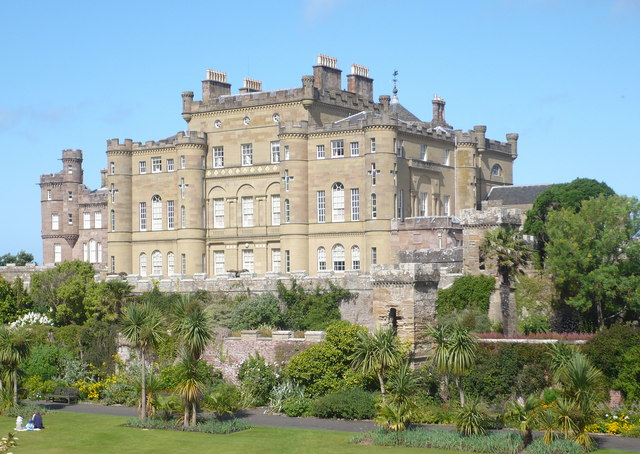
Culzean Castle, Ayrshire

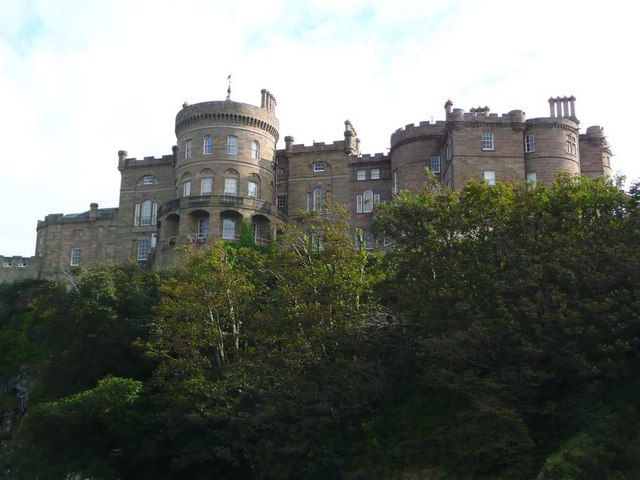
Culzean Castle, Ayrshire

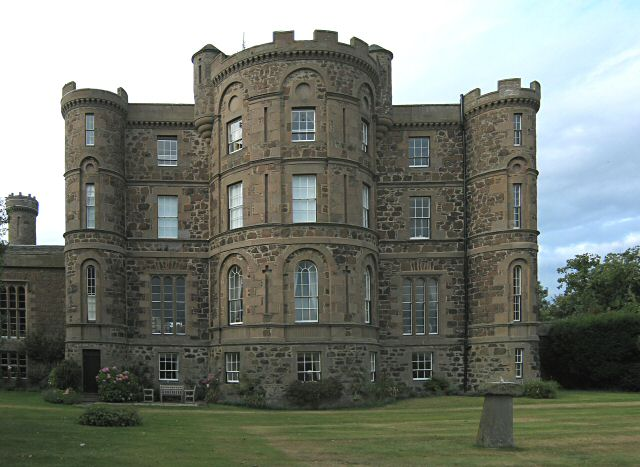
Pitfour Castle, Tayside

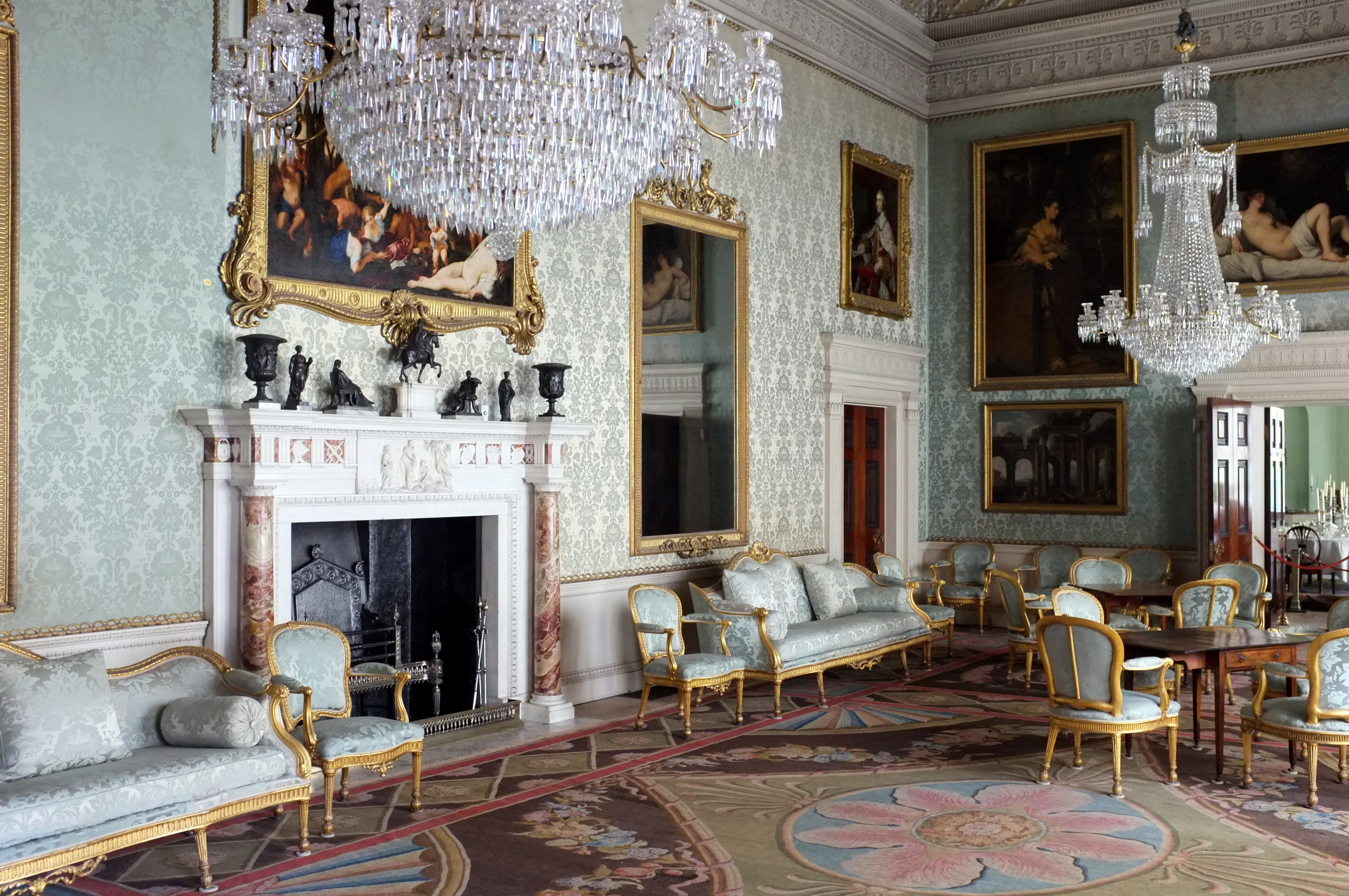
The Saloon, Saltram House

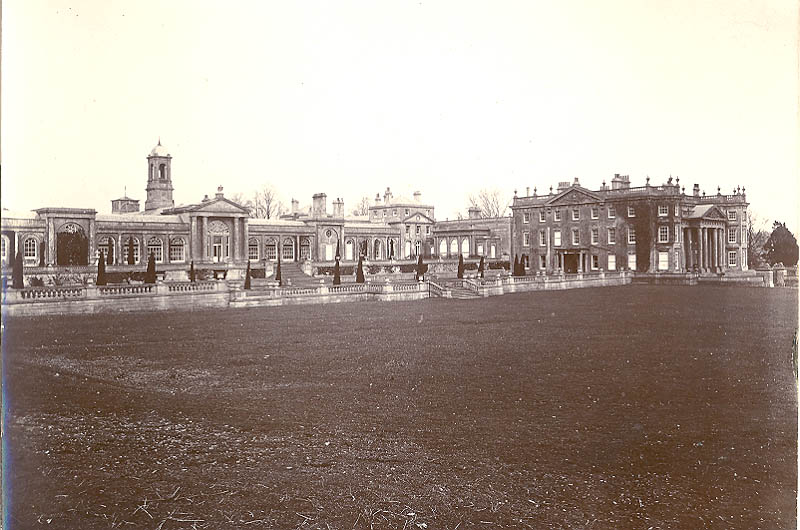
Bowood House, Adam's Diocletian wing on left, the main block demolished in 1950s

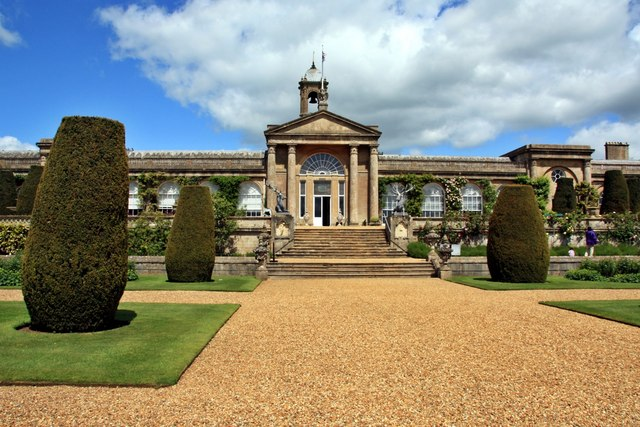
Bowood House, Diocletian wing

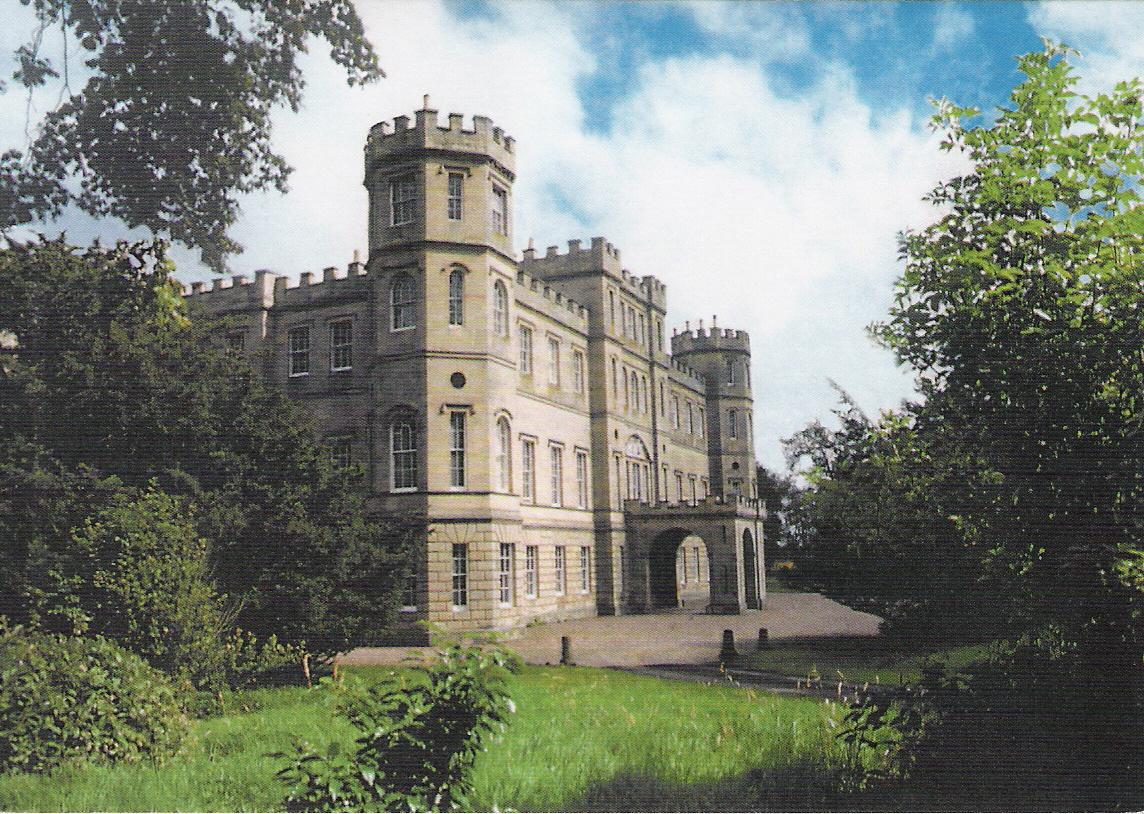
Wedderburn Castle, Berwickshire

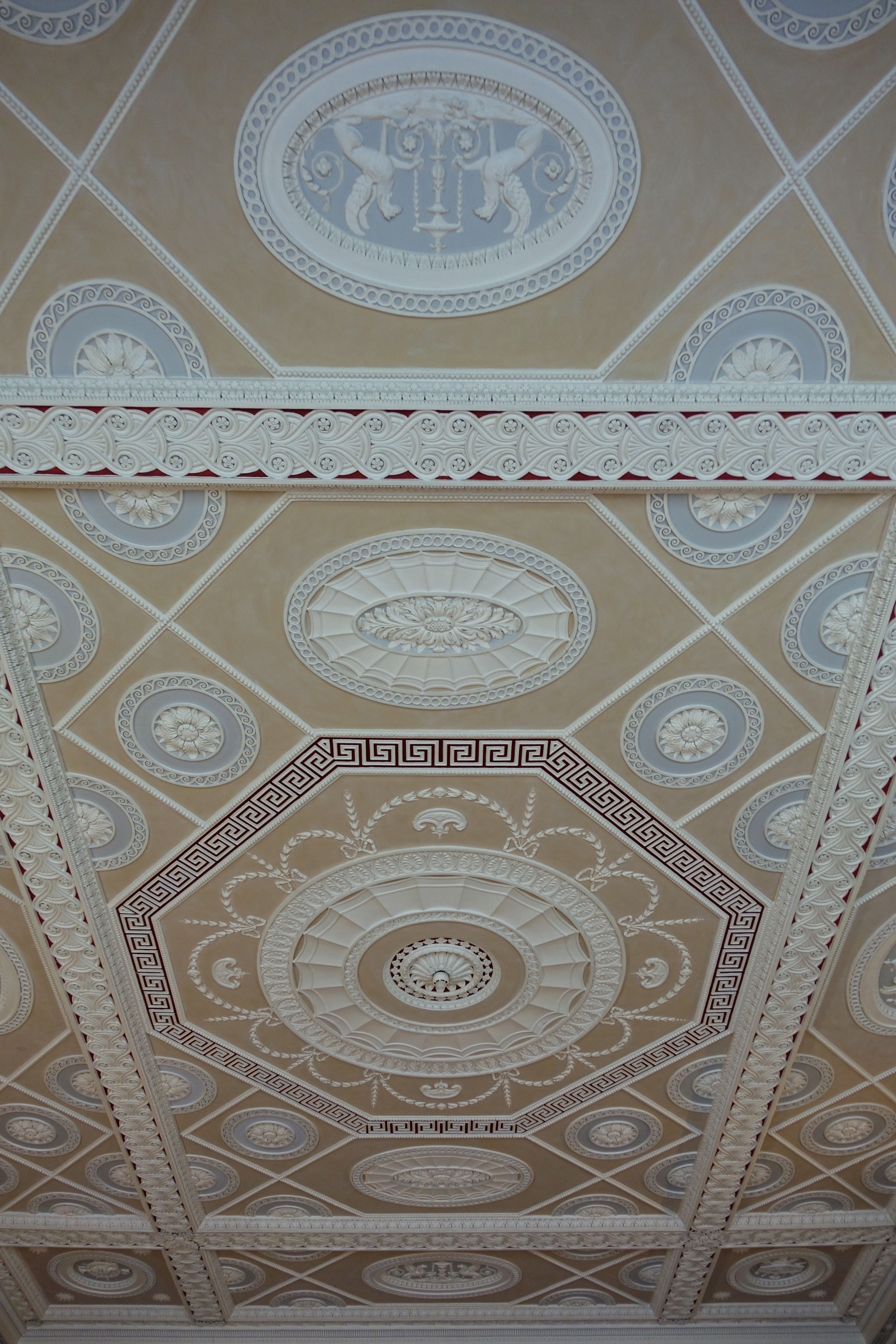
The Entrance Hall Ceiling, Harewood House

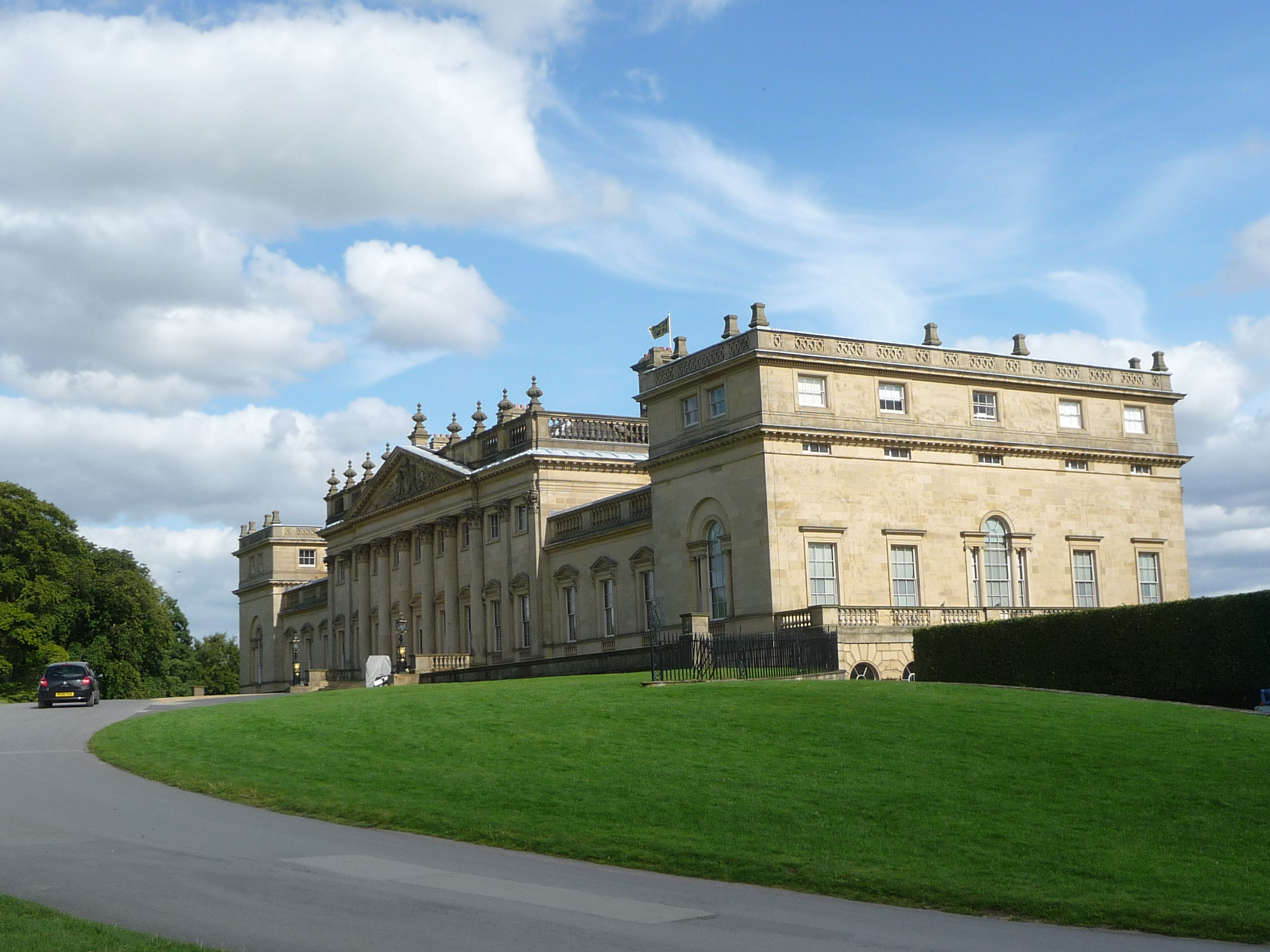
Harewood House, Yorkshire, altered by Sir Charles Barry

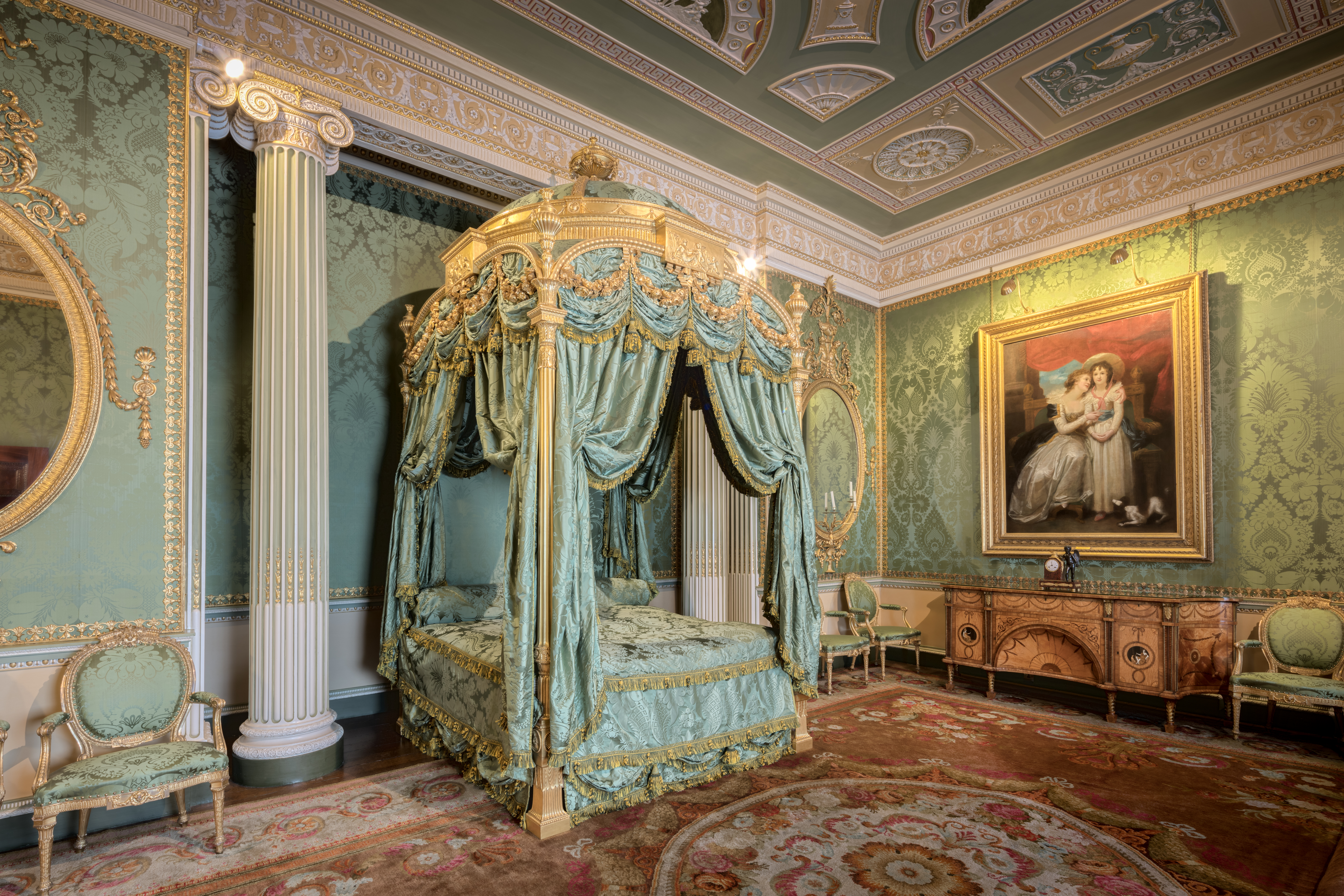
Harewood House, State Bedroom

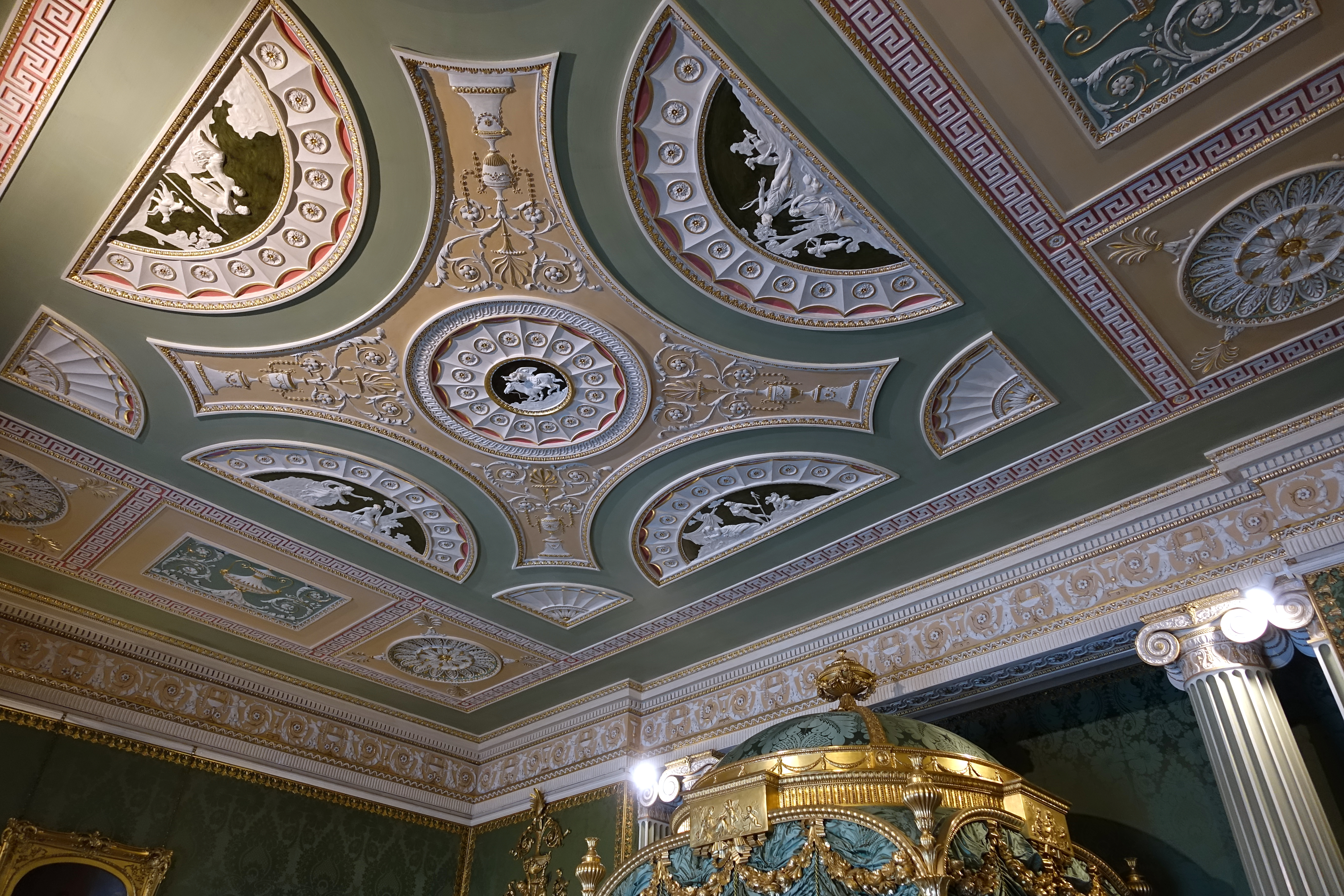
The Ceiling, State Bedroom, Harewood House

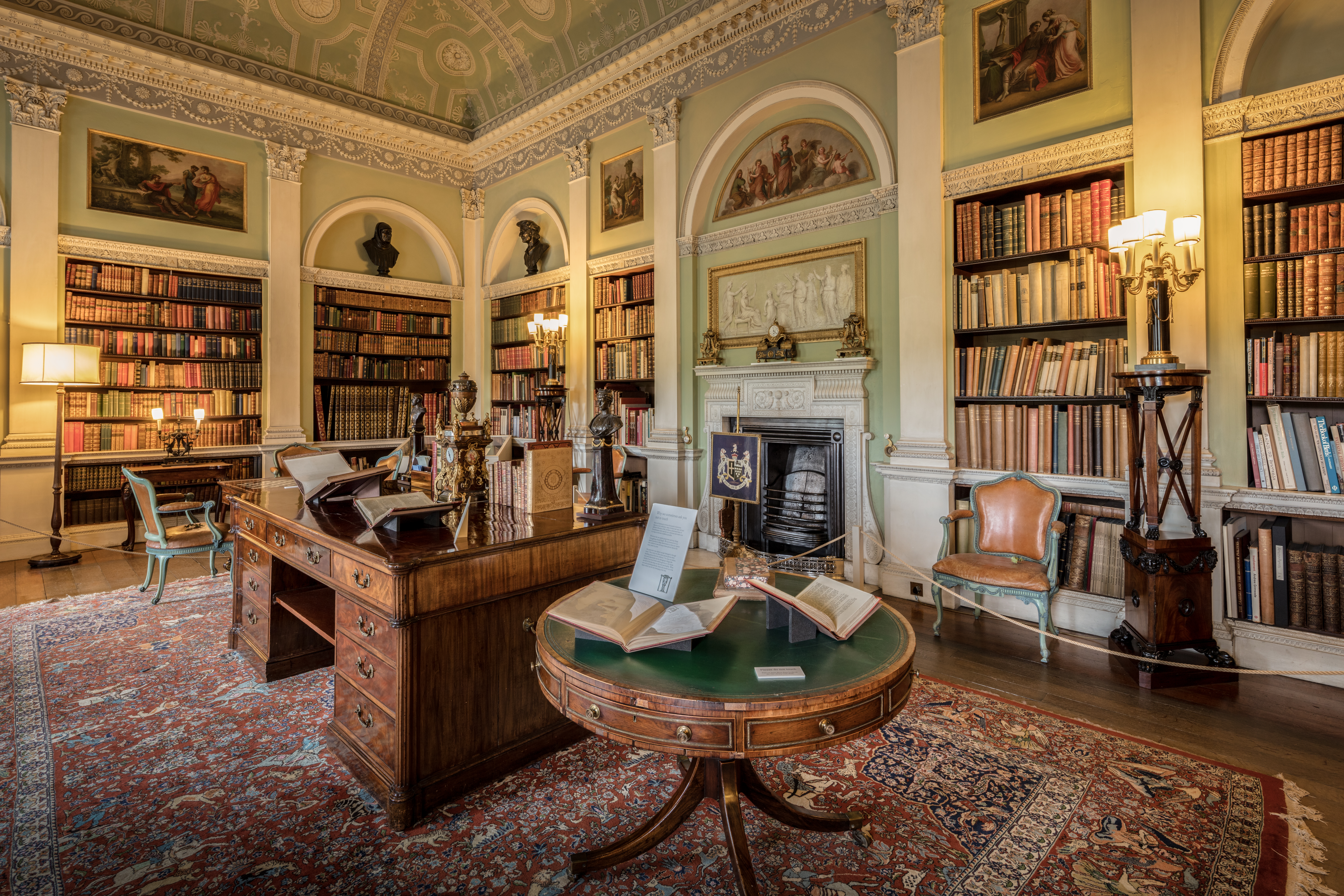
Harewood House, Old Library

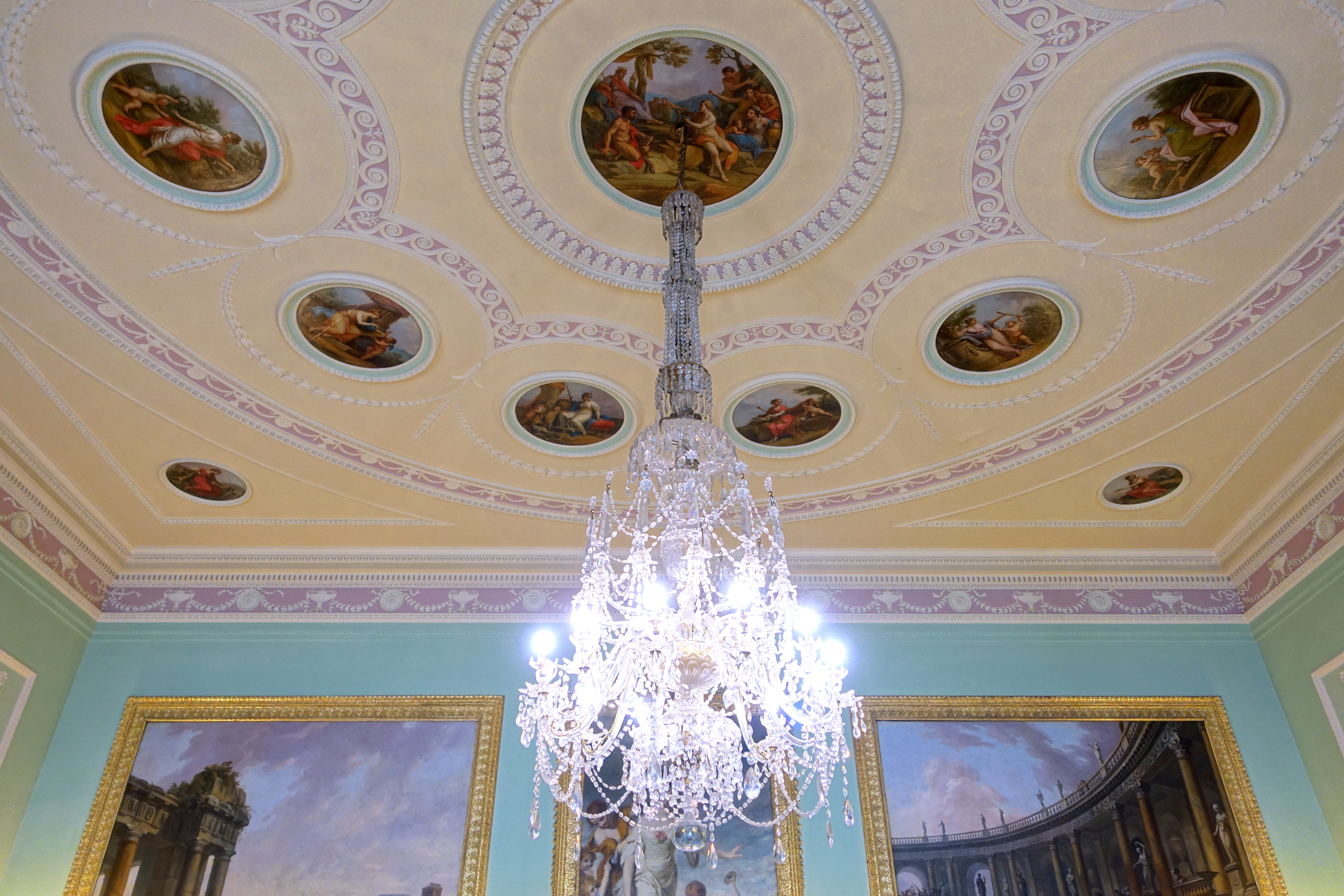
Harewood House, Music Room Ceiling

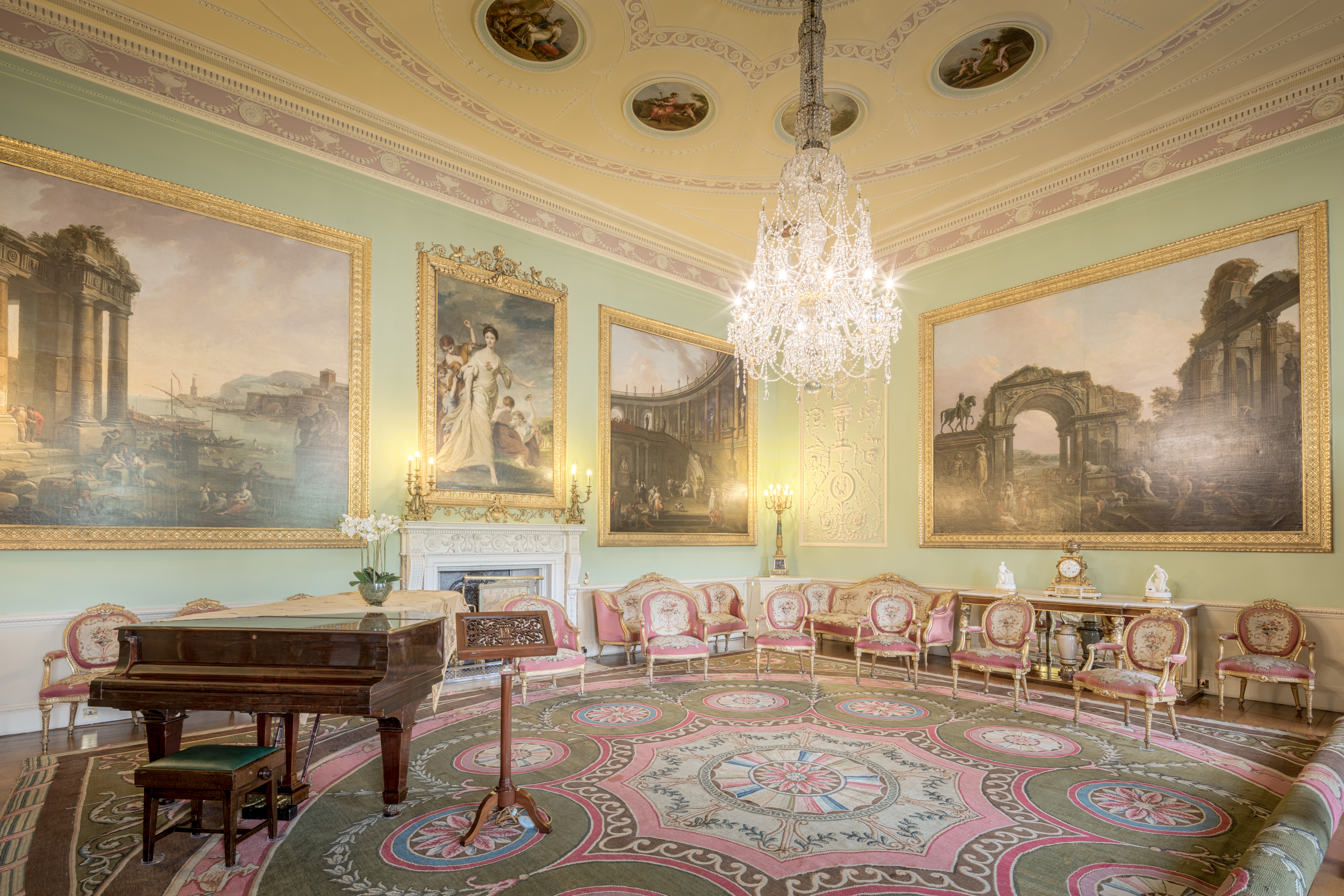
The Music Room, Harewood House

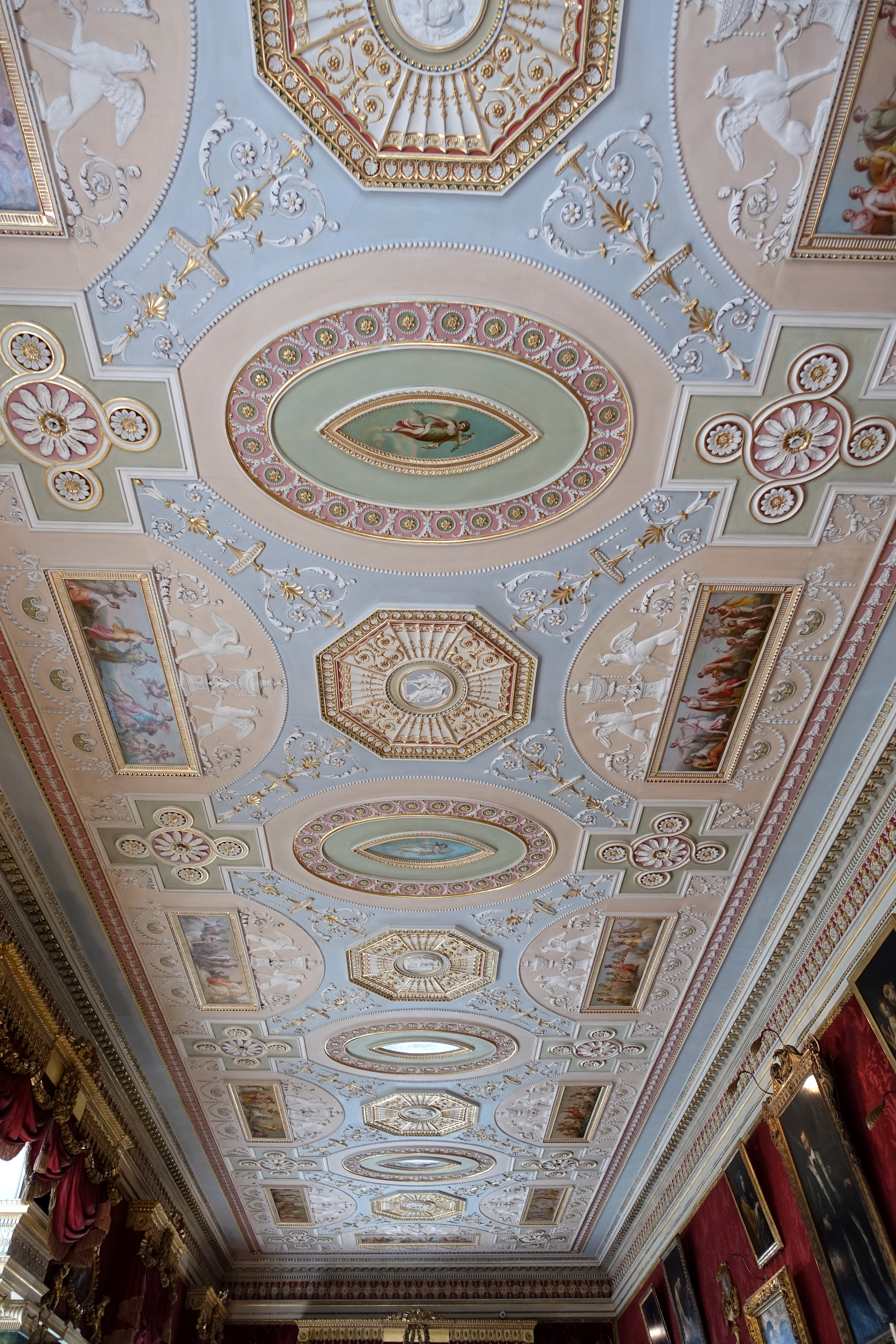
Gallery ceiling, Harewood House

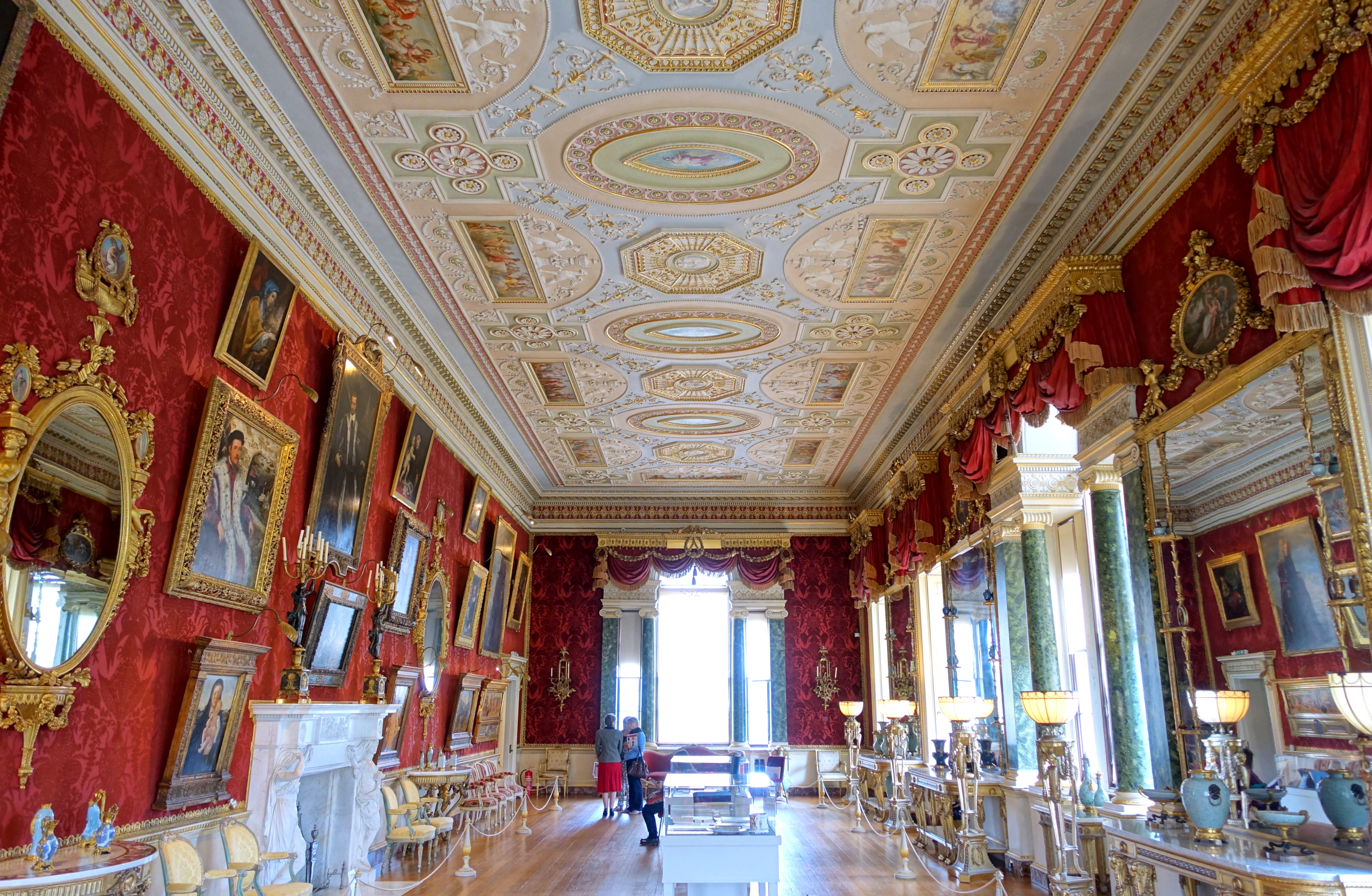
The Gallery, Harewood House

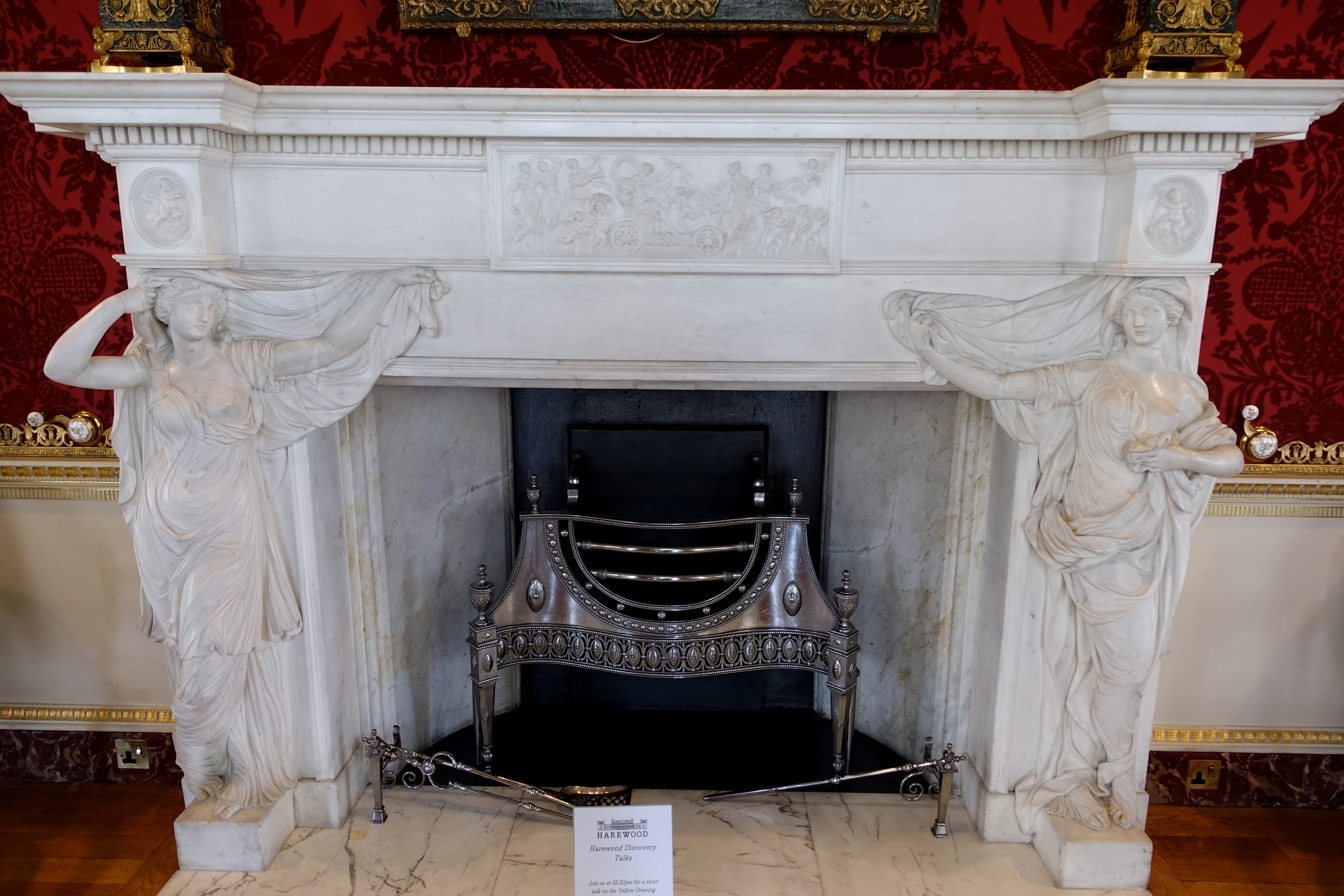
Gallery fireplace, Harewood House

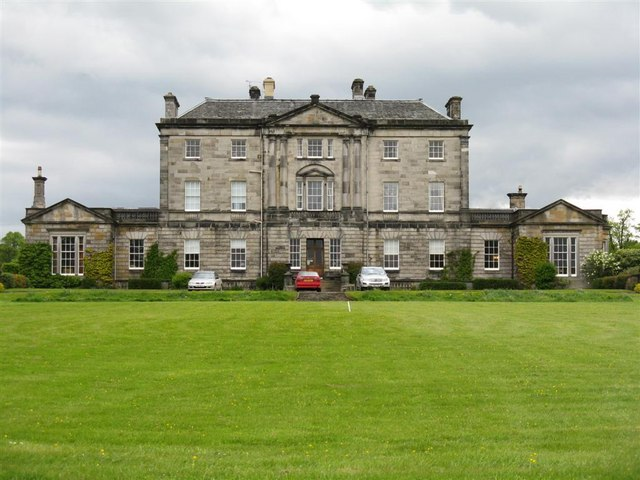
Newliston House

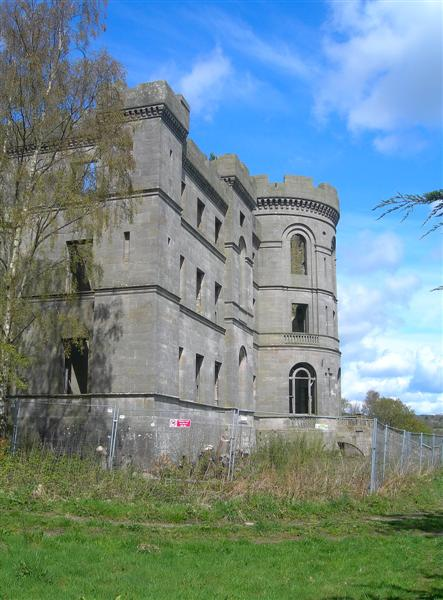
Dalquarran Castle, Ayrshire

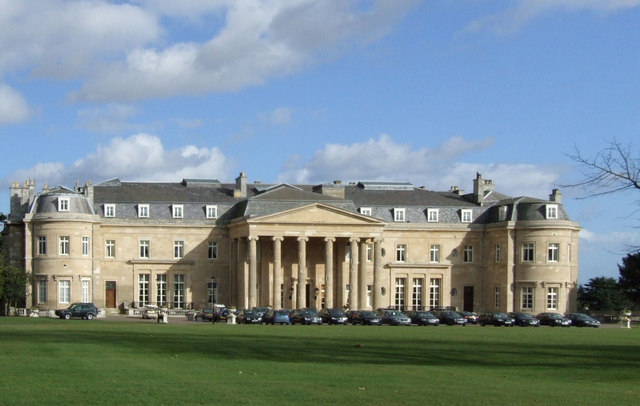
Luton Hoo House, Bedfordshire, altered by Sir Robert Smirke and again in the late 19th century

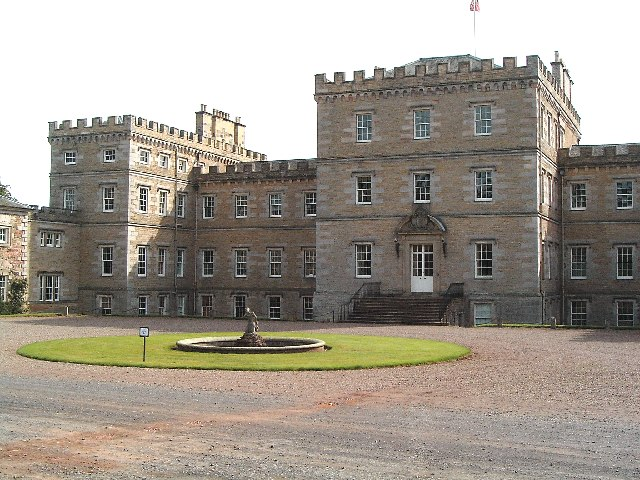
Mellerstain House, Berwickshire

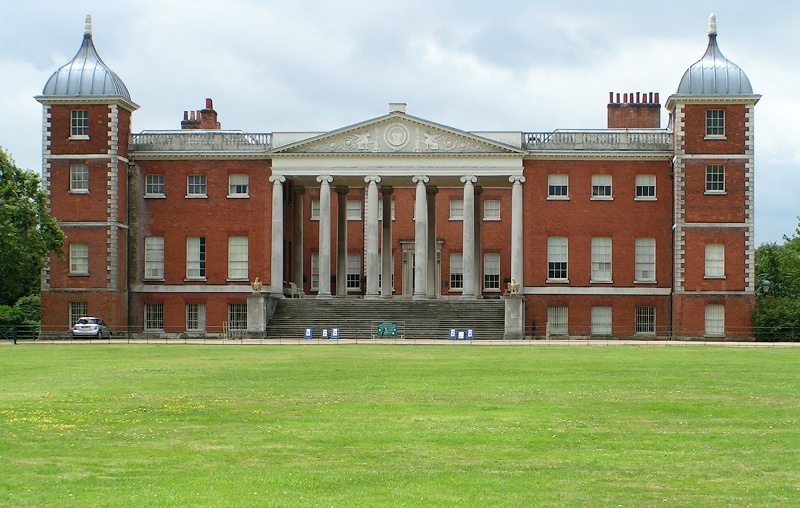
Osterley Park, London

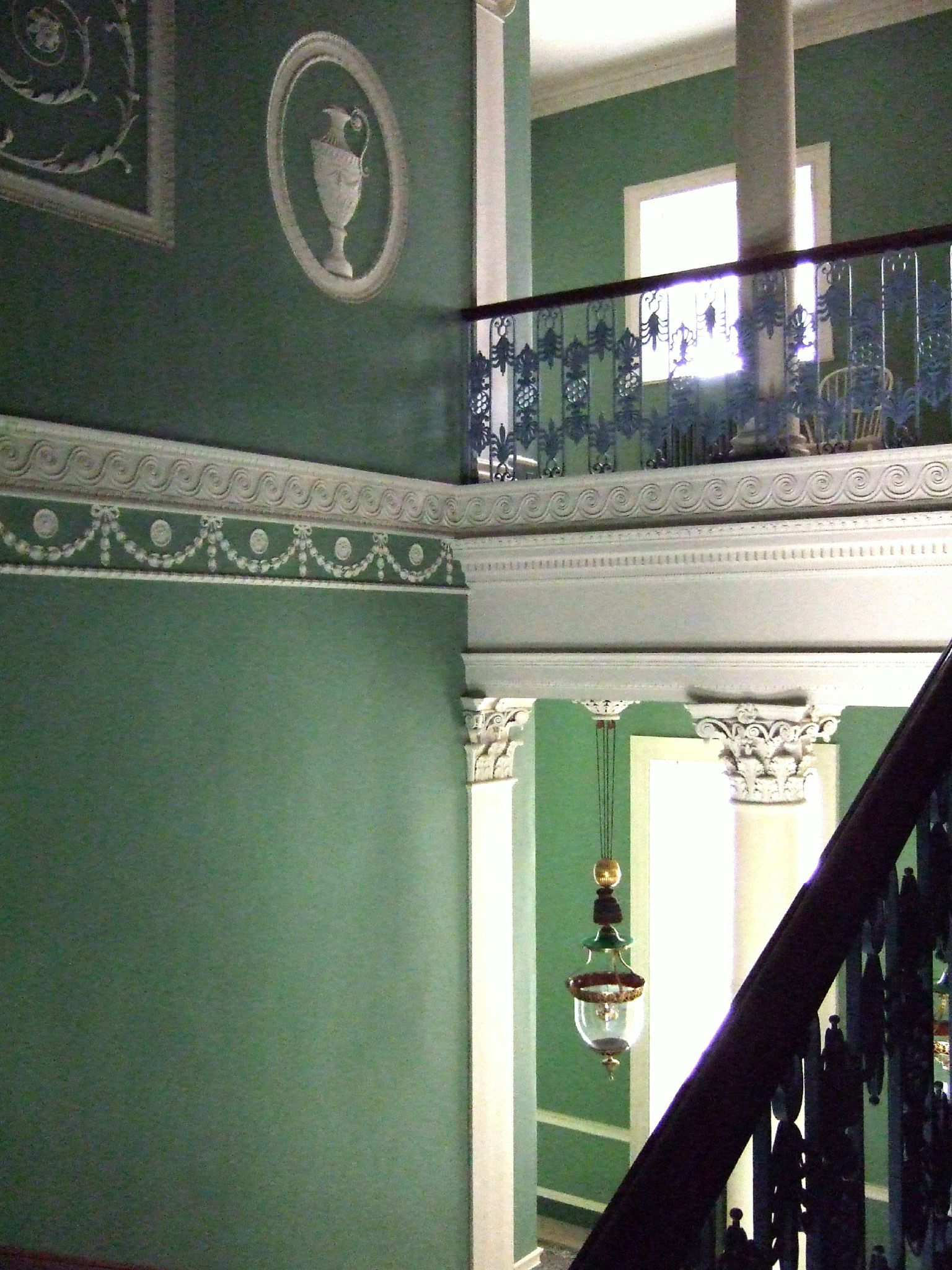
Main Staircase, Osterley Park, London

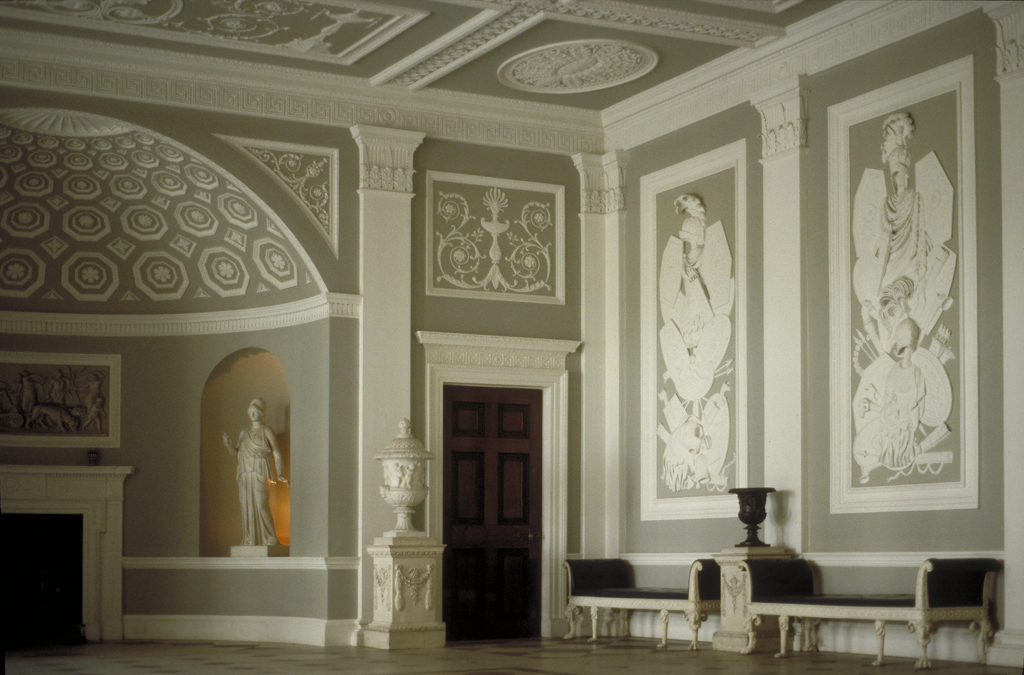
Entrance Hall, Osterley Park, London

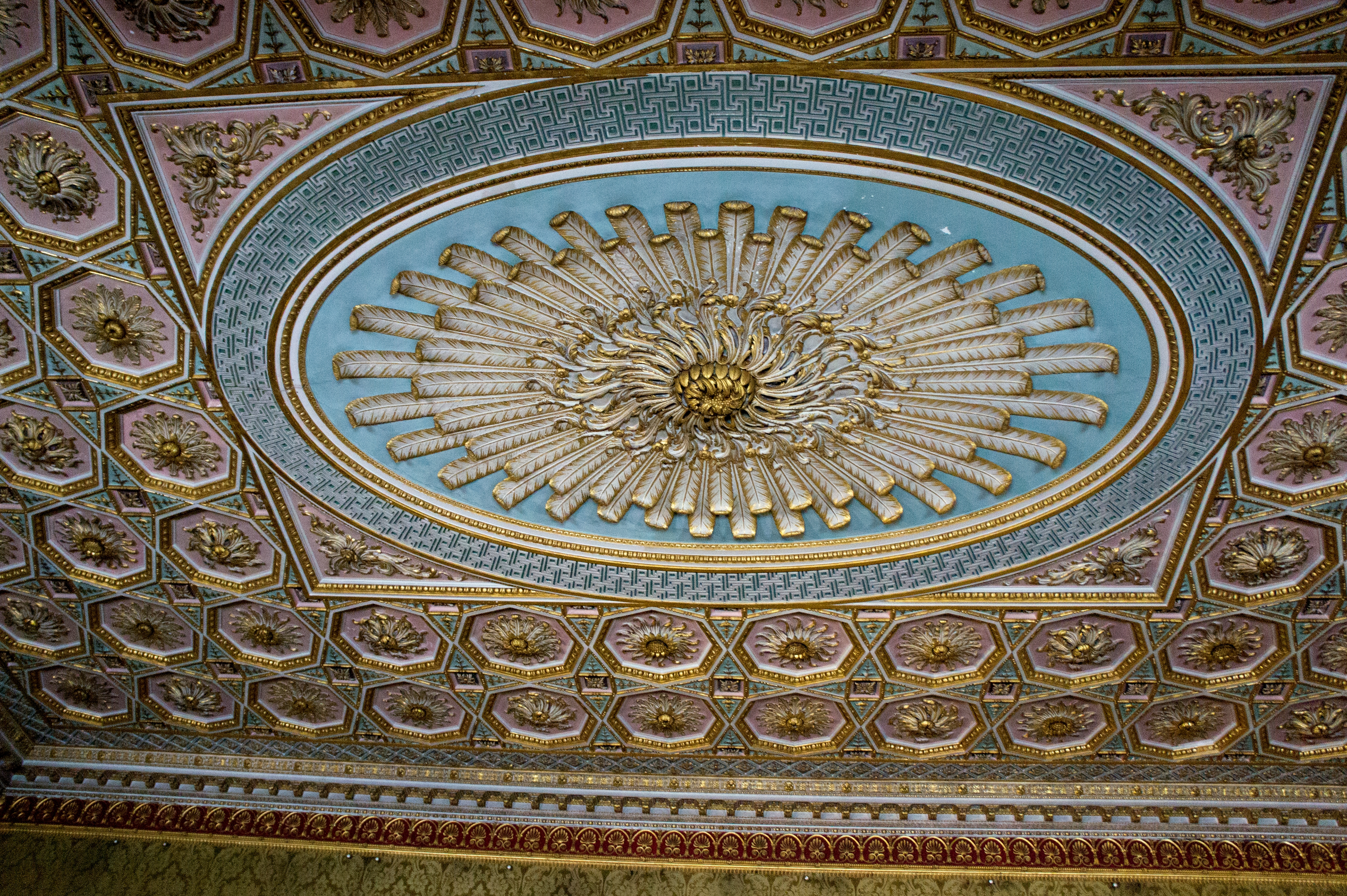
Osterley Park, Drawing Room Ceiling

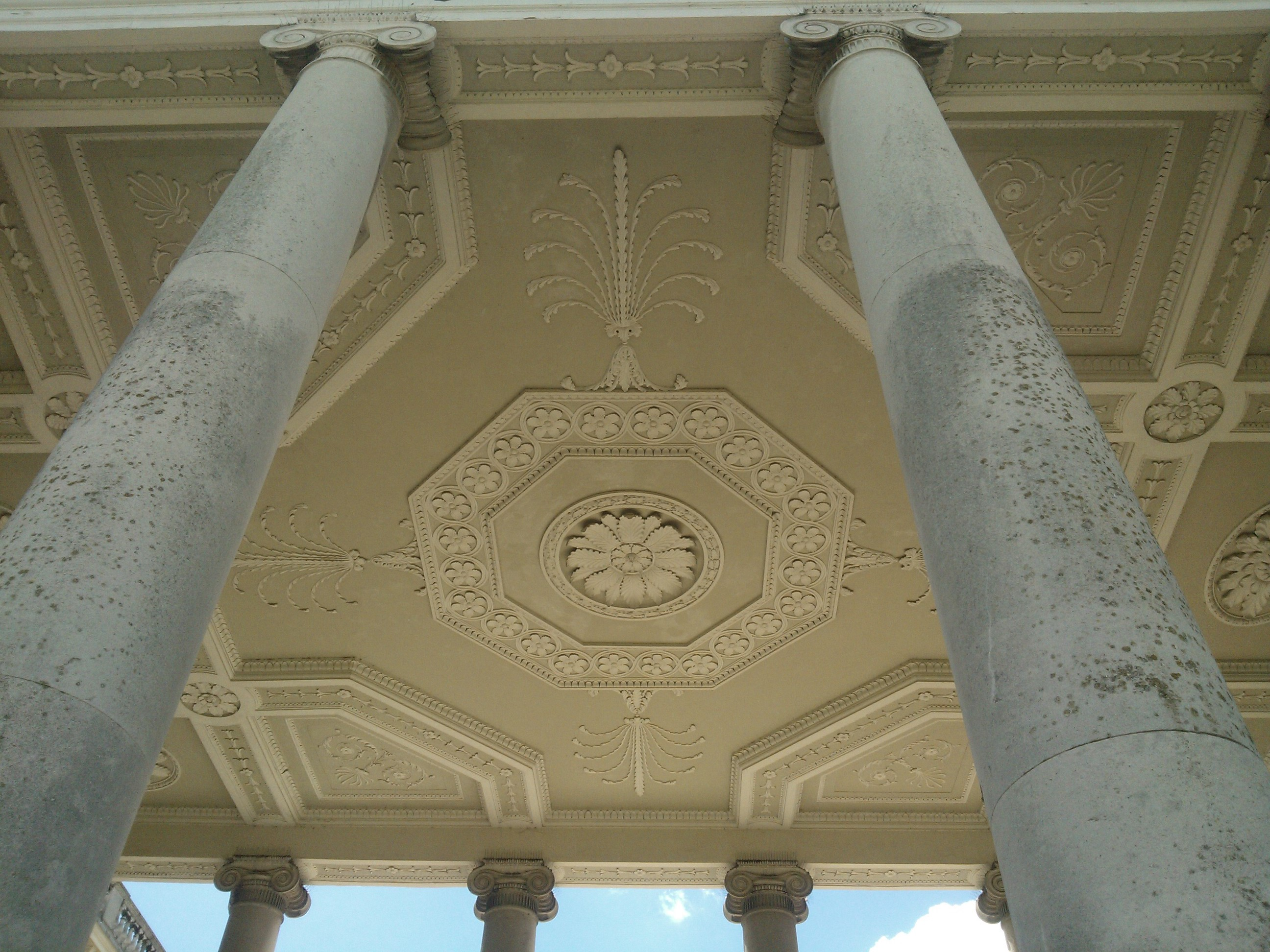
Portico Ceiling, Osterley Park

=== Garden buildings and follies ===
- Stables, Inveraray Castle, joint work with his brother John (1758–1760)
- North Lodge, Kedleston Hall (1759)
- Circular and Octagon pavilion, La Trappe, Hammersmith (1760) for George Bubb Dodington (demolished)
- Conservatory Croome Park (1760)
- Rotunda Croome Park, attributed (1760)
- Old Rectory, Kedleston Hall (c. 1761)
- Entrance screen, Moor Park, Hertfordshire (1763)
- The Conservatory, Osterley Park (1763)
- Bridge, Audley End House, Essex (c. 1763–1764)
- Tea Pavilion, Moor Park, Hertfordshire (c. 1764)
- Gatehouse Kimbolton Castle (c. 1764)
- Bridge, Kedleston Hall (1764)
- Estate Village Lowther, Cumbria (1766)
- Dunstall 'Castle' and Garden Alcove, Croome Park (1766)
- Entrance arch, Croome Court (1767)
- Entrance Screen, Cullen House, Cullen, Moray (1767)
- Bridge, Osterley Park (c. 1768)
- Entrance screen, Syon House (1769)
- Fishing, Boat & Bath House, Kedleston Hall (1770–71)
- Circular Temple, Audley End House, Essex (1771)
- Lion Bridge, Alnwick (1773)
- Stag Lodge, Saltram House, Devon (c. 1773)
- The Stables, Featherstone entrance & Huntwick arch Nostell Priory (1776)
- Wyke Green Lodges, Osterley, Middlesex (1777); remodelled
- The Home Farm, Culzean Castle, Ayrshire (1777–1779)
- Brizlee Tower, Alnwick, Gothic tower (1777–1781)
- Oswald's Temple, Auchincruive, Ayrshire (1778)
- 'Ruined' arch and viaduct, Culzean Castle (1780)
- The semi-circular conservatory, Osterley Park (1780)
- Tea House Bridge, Audley End House, Essex (1782)
- The Stables, Culzean Castle (c. 1785)
- Stables, Castle Upton, Templepatrick, County Antrim, Ireland. (1788–1789). Important range of office buildings in castle style
- Montagu Bridge, Dalkeith Palace, Lothian (1792)
- Loftus Hall, Fethard-on-sea, County Wexford, Ireland. Date unknown. Proposed gates
- Lion Gate and Lodge, Syon Park, London. Date unknown
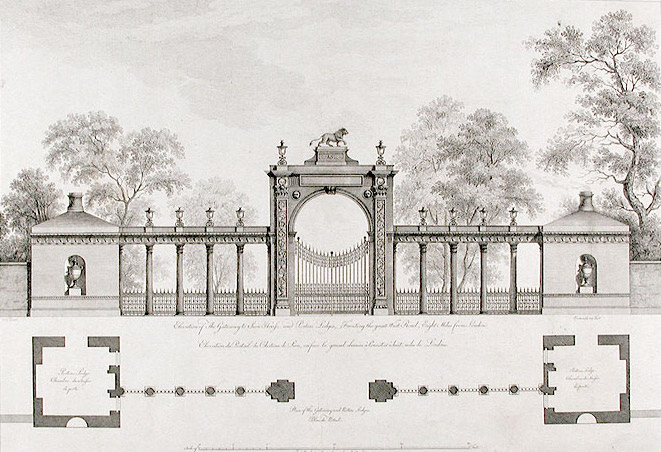
Screen, Syon House, London

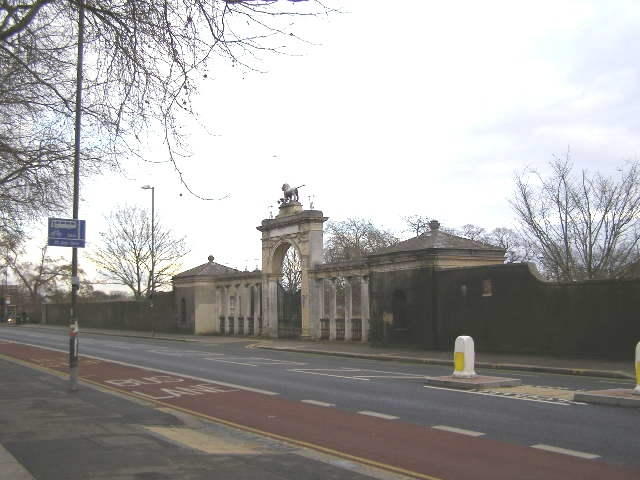
The Lion Gate, Syon Park, London

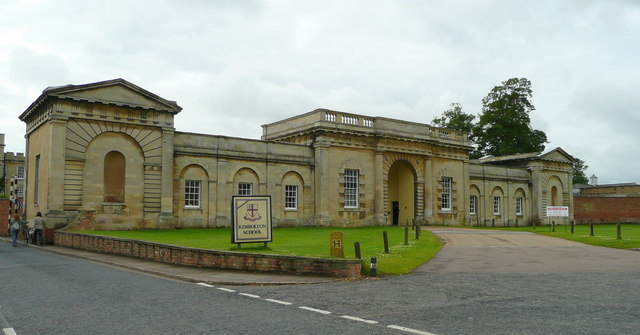
Gatehouse, Kimbolton Castle

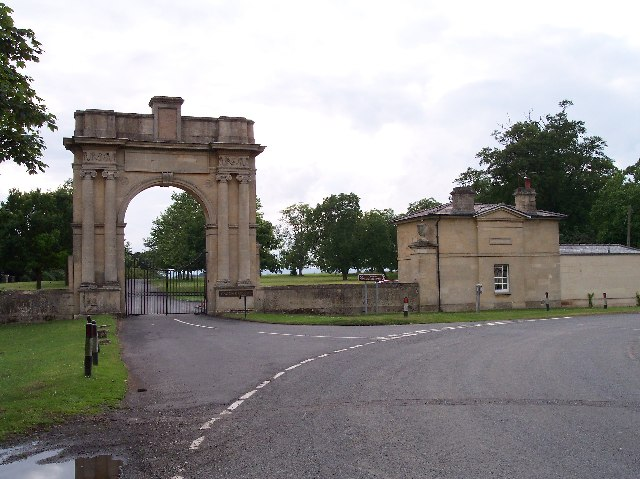
Entrance Arch, Croome Park, Worcestershire

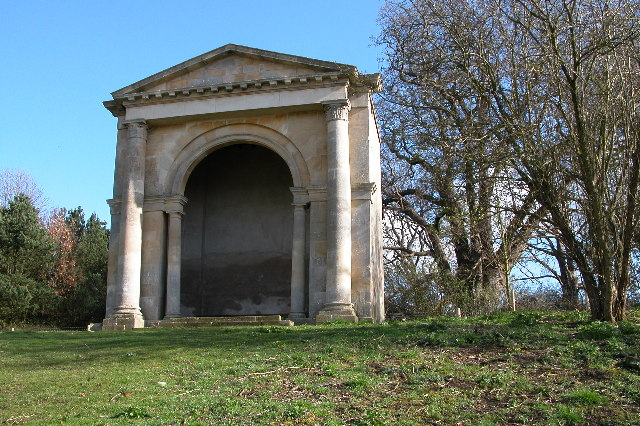
Garden Alcove, Croome Court, Worcestershire

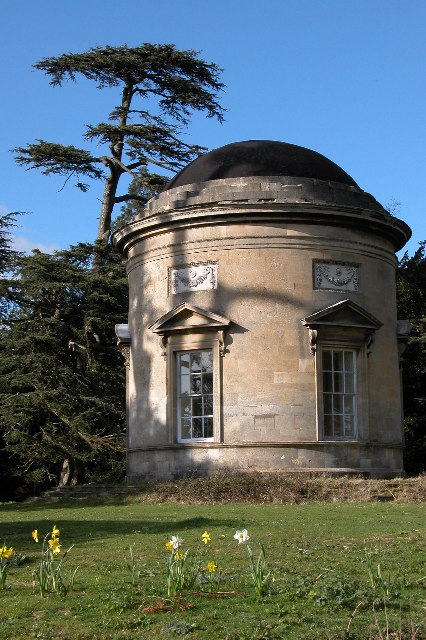
Rotunda, Croome Park, Worcestershire

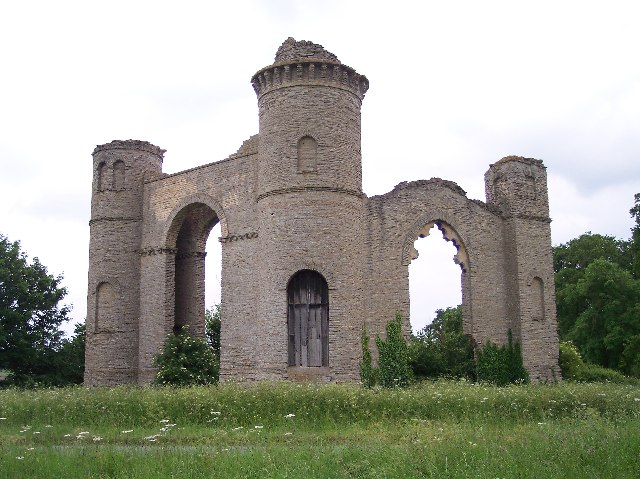
Dunstall "Castle", Croome Court, Worcestershire

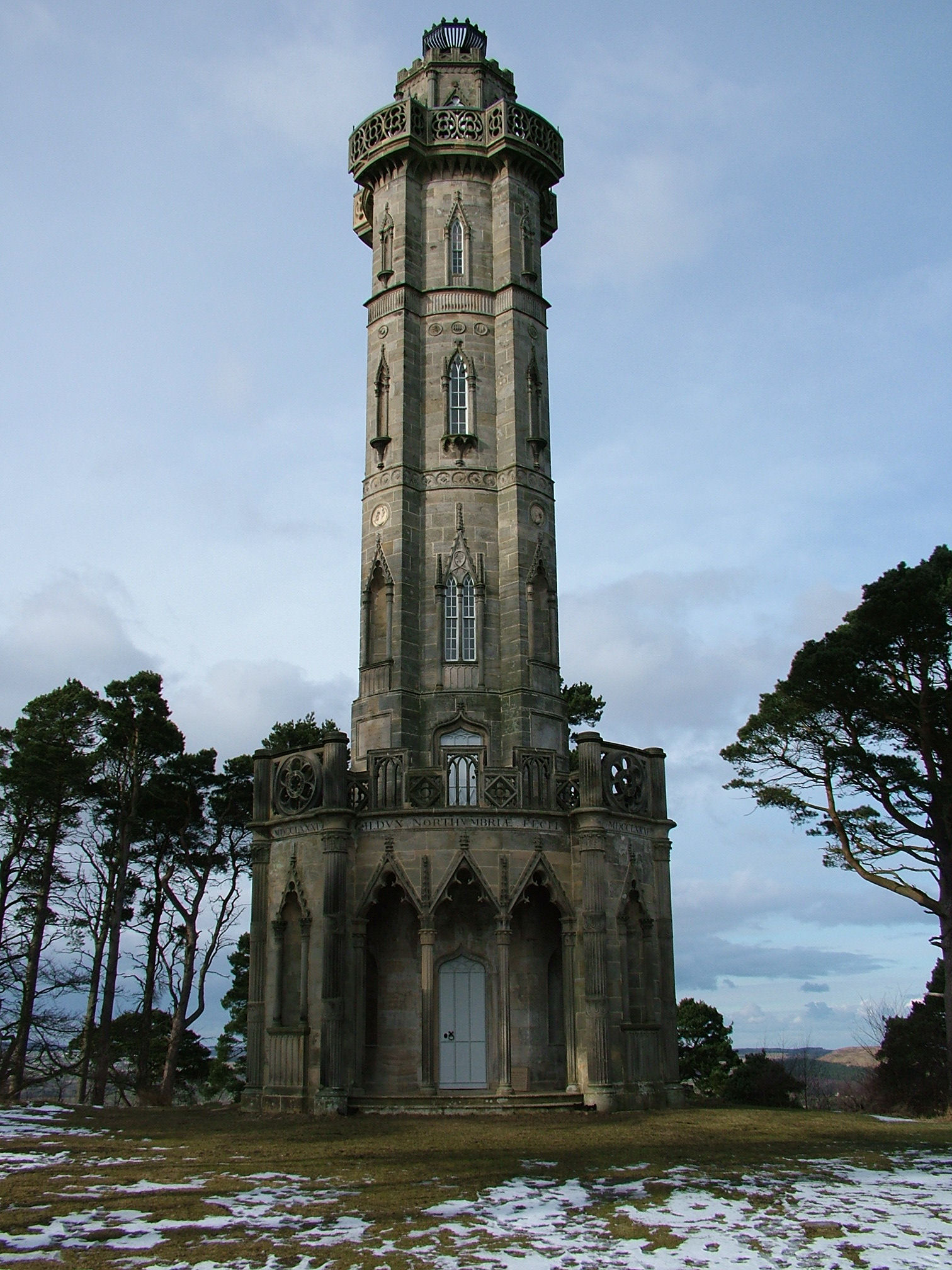
Brizlee Tower, Alnwick

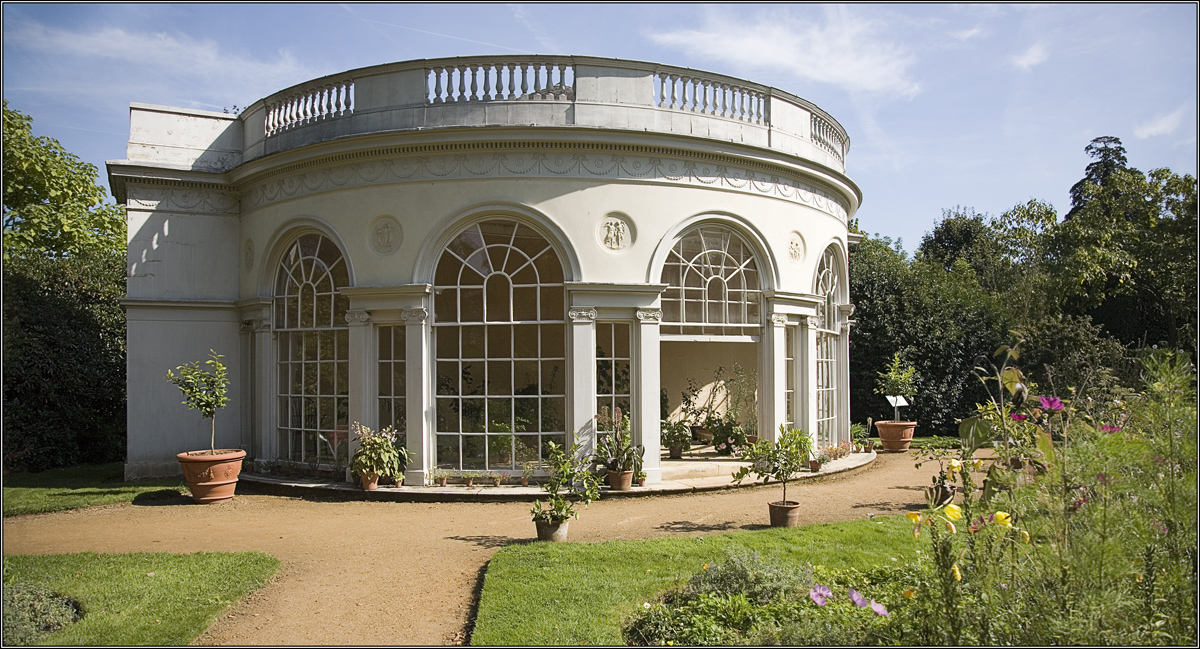
The semi-circular conservatory, Osterley Park

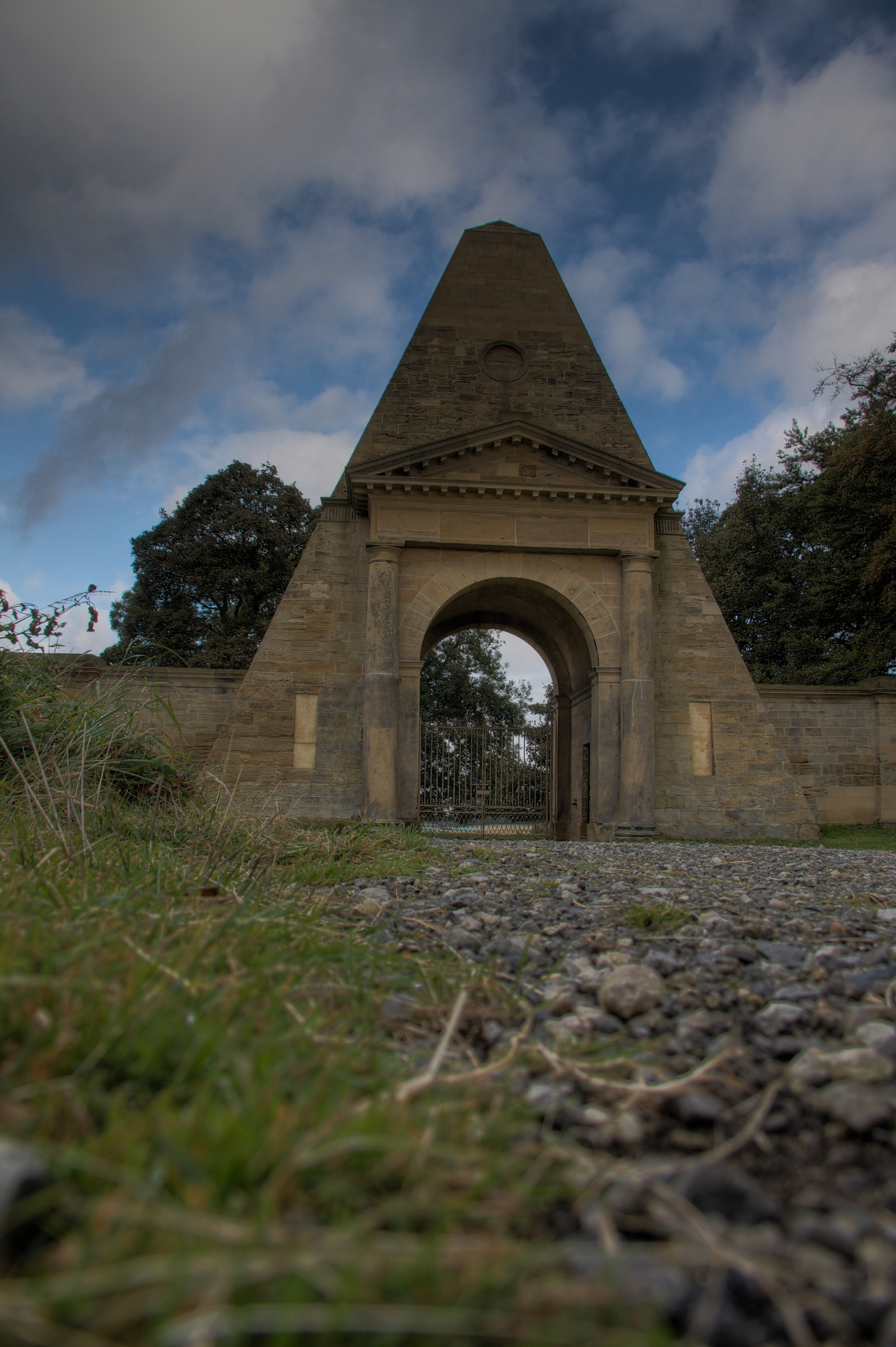
Featherstone entrance, Nostell Priory, Yorkshire

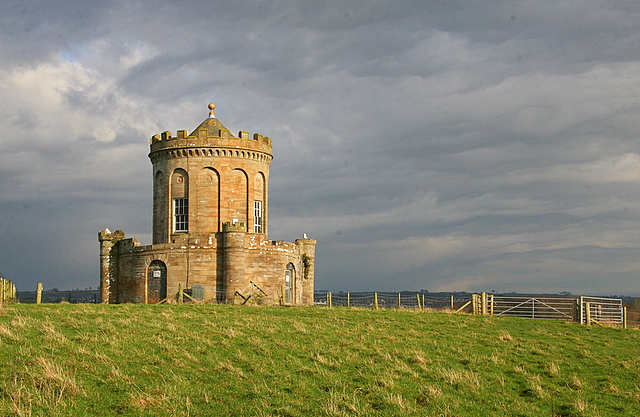
Oswald's Temple, Auchincruive, Ayrshire

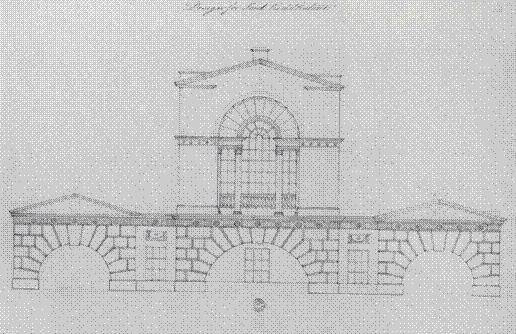
Kedleston Fishing, Bathing & Boat House

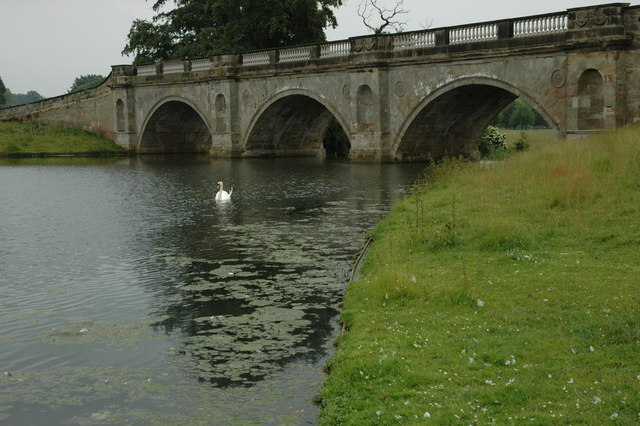
Kedleston Bridge

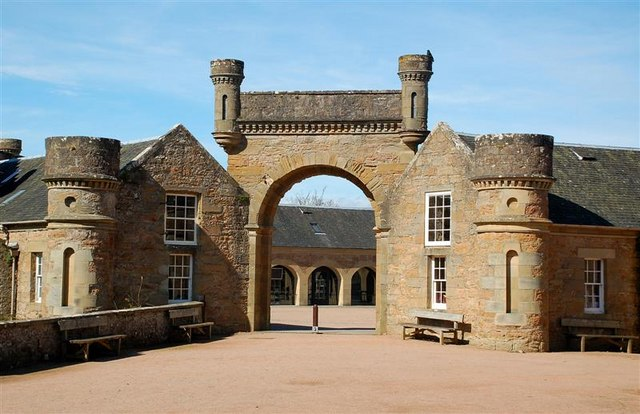
Former Home Farm, Culzean Castle

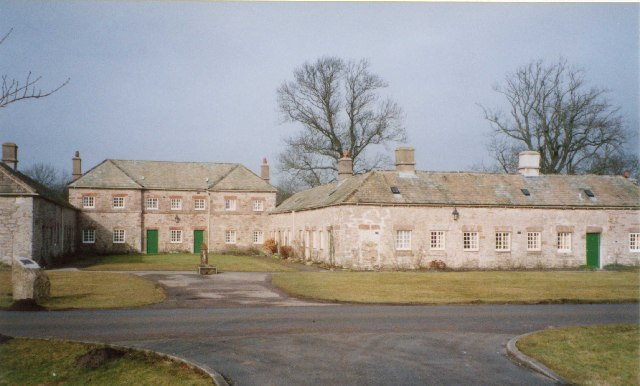
Lowther Castle Model Village

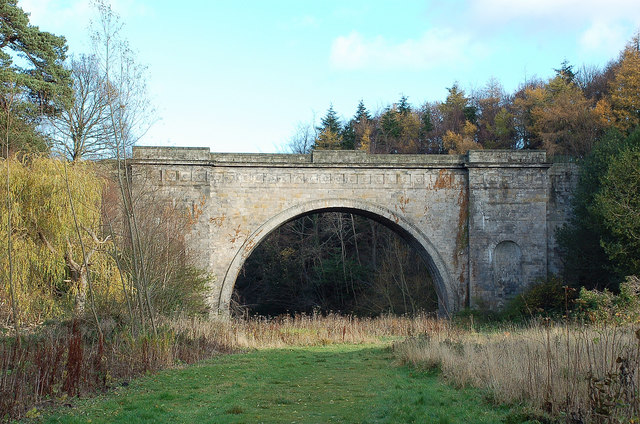
Montagu Bridge, Dalkeith Palace

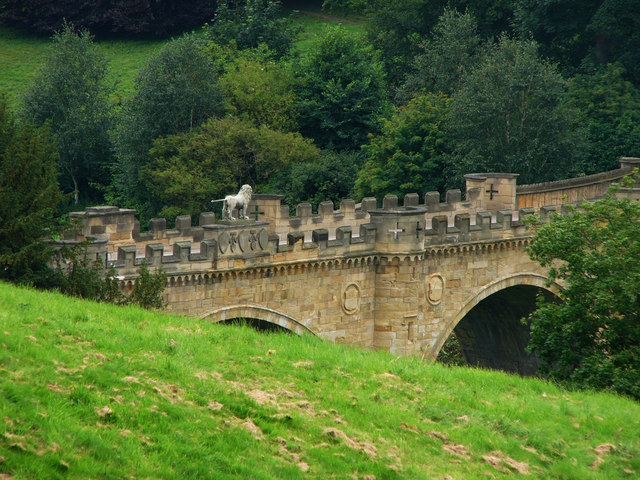
The Lion Bridge, Alnwick

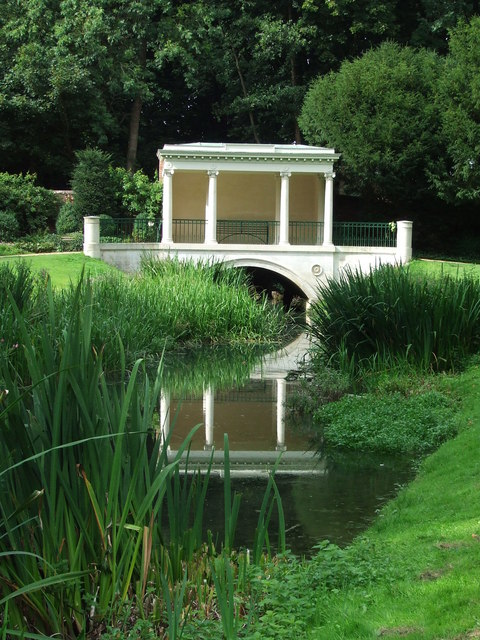
Tea House Bridge, Audley End

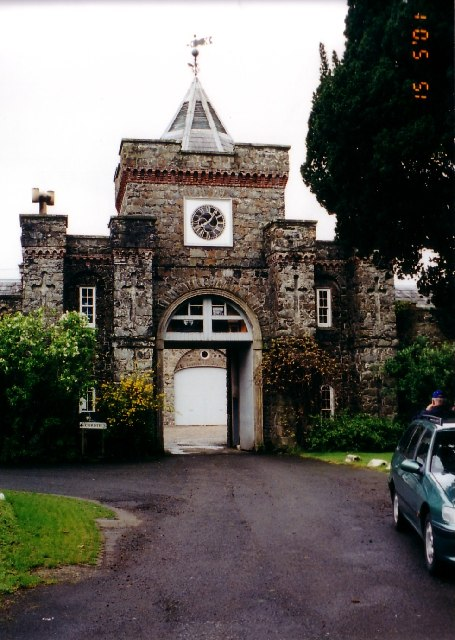
Clock Tower, Stables, Castle Upton, County Meath

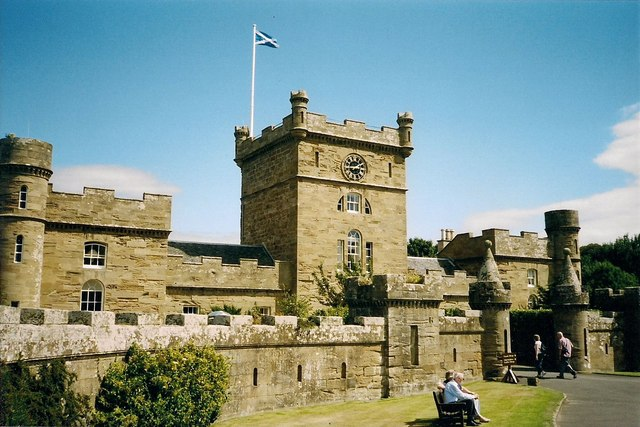
Stables, Culzean Castle, Ayrshire

=== Country houses with minor work ===
- Hopetoun House, West Lothian (interiors) (1750–1754), the house was designed by William Adam
- Ballochmyle House, Ayrshire (c. 1757–1760)
- Compton Verney House, added the wings and interiors (1760–1763)
- Croome Park, three interiors: the Library the fittings are in the Victoria and Albert Museum, Gallery and Tapestry Room this is now in the Metropolitan Museum of Art, (1760–1765)
- Audley End House, redecoration of ground floor rooms (1763–1765)
- Goldsborough Hall, near Knaresborough, North Yorkshire (1764–1765)
- Alnwick Castle, Northumberland (interiors) (1766) destroyed when Anthony Salvin created the current state rooms
- Woolton Hall, Woolton, Merseyside (1772), remodelled main façade and the interior
- Headfort House, County Meath, Ireland. Internal work, including stairs and notably the Great Eating Room (1775) for Thomas Taylour, 1st. Earl Bective.
- Wormleybury, Hertfordshire, internal work including entrance hall & staircase (1777)
- Downhill, near Coleraine, County Londonderry, Ireland. (1780) Design for dining room. Not executed. House is now a crumbling ruin.
- Moccas Court, Moccas, Herefordshire, internal work including drawing room (1781)
- Castle Upton, Templepartick, County Antrim, Ireland. Remodelling of house. (1782–1783) for 1st. Lord Templetown.
- Archerfield House, Lothian, internal work including library (1791)
- Summerhill House, County Meath, Ireland. 1765 unexecuted. Proposed alterations including a quadrant link connecting two wings.
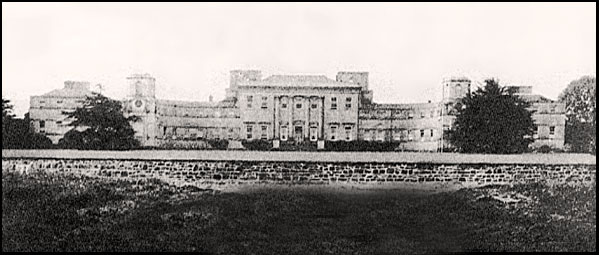
Summerhill House, Main Front.

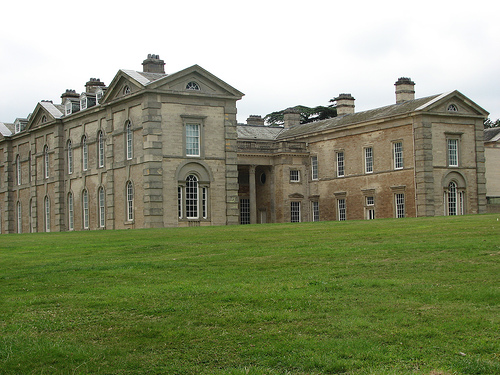
Compton Verney House, wings by Adam

== See also ==
- Adam style
- Category:Robert Adam buildings

== Sources ==
- Adam, Robert (1764) Ruins of the palace of the Emperor Diocletian at Spalatro in Dalmatia
- Beard, Geoffrey (1978) The Work of Robert Adam, John Bartholomew & Son. ISBN 0-702810-87-8
- Bolton, Arthur T. (1922, reprinted 1984) The Architecture of Robert & James Adam, 1785–1794, 2 volumes ISBN 0-907462-49-9
- Curl, James Stevens (2006) Oxford Dictionary of Architecture and Landscape Architecture 2nd Edition. Oxford University Press. ISBN 0-19-860678-8
- Fleming, John (1962) Robert Adam and his Circle John Murray ISBN 0-7195-0000-1
- Glendinning, Miles, and McKechnie, Aonghus, (2004) Scottish Architecture, Thames and Hudson. ISBN 0-500-20374-1
- Graham, Roderick (2009) Arbiter of Elegance: A Biography of Robert Adam (Birlinn, ISBN 978-1-84158-802-5)
- Harris, Eileen (1963) The Furniture of Robert Adam Alec Tiranti, London. ISBN 0-85458-929-5.
- Harris, Eileen (2001) The Genius of Robert Adam: His Interiors ISBN 0-300-08129-4
- Lees-Milne, James (1947) The Age of Adam, London: B. T. Batsford.
- Pevsner, Nikolaus (1951) An Outline of European Architecture 2nd Edition. Pelican
- Roth, Leland M. (1993). Understanding Architecture: Its Elements, History and Meaning (First ed.). Boulder, CO: Westview Press. ISBN 0-06-430158-3.
- Stillman, Damie (1966) The Decorative Work of Robert Adam ISBN 0-85458-160-X
- Tait, A. A. (2004) "Adam, Robert (1728–1792)", Oxford Dictionary of National Biography, Oxford University Press, doi:10.1093/ref:odnb/105
- Yarwood, Doreen (1970) Robert Adam ISBN 0-460-03824-9 and ISBN 0-460-02130-3 (1973 paperback)
- Belamarić, Joško – Šverko, Ana (eds.): Robert Adam and Diocletian's Palace in Split, Zagreb 2017, ISBN 978-953-0-60975-4

Parliament of Great Britain
Preceded by Robert Colvile (to 1761)	Member of Parliament for Kinross-shire; 1768–1774	Succeeded by George Graham (from 1780)
Government offices
New office	Architect of the King's Works; 1761–1769; Served alongside: Sir William Chambers	Succeeded by Sir Robert Taylor and James Adam
