= Woodland View =

- NHS Ayrshire and Arran
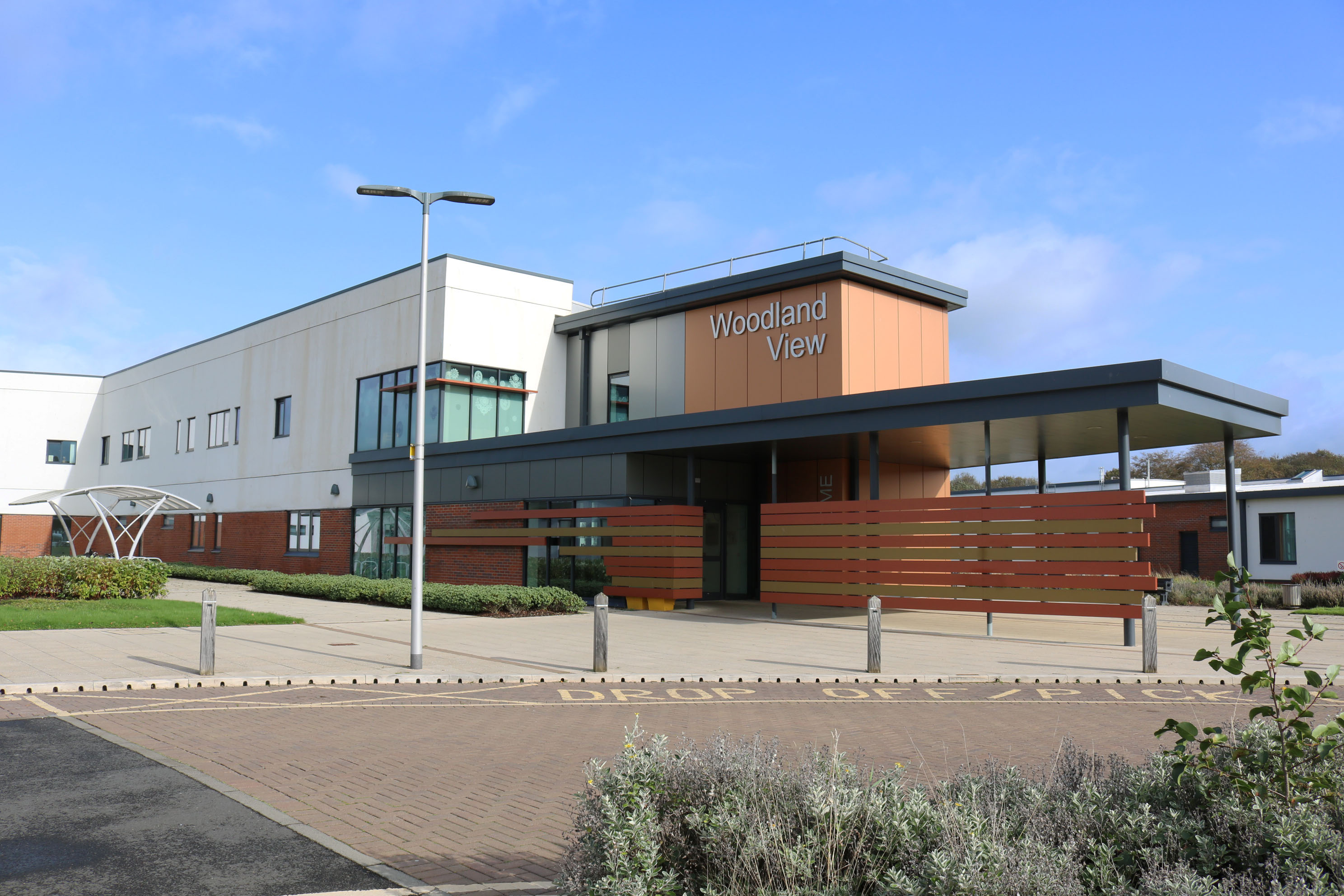
- Woodland View in 2019

Geography
- Location: Irvine, North Ayrshire, Scotland
- Coordinates: 55.634574°N 4.676549°W

Organisation
- Care system: NHS Scotland
- Type: Acute mental health facility and community hospital

Services
- Emergency department: No
- Beds: 206

Helipads
- Helipad: No

History
- Opened: 2016

Woodland View is an acute mental health hospital, acute adult services and elderly and community rehabilitation facility located within the grounds of Ayrshire Central Hospital, Irvine, North Ayrshire, Scotland. The hospital was constructed by Balfour Beattie Construction, and opened in 2016.

== History ==
Mental health services and community rehabilitation services were previously provided within hospital wards at hospitals such as University Hospital Crosshouse and Ailsa Hospital next to University Hospital Ayr. NHS Ayrshire and Arran wished to bring mental health, acute care and rehabilitation services into one centralised location. The majority of patients from Ailsa Hospital and two mental health wards at University Hospital Crosshouse moved to Woodland View, with the hospital officially opening in 2016.

In 2024, a new Mental Health Unscheduled Care Assessment Hub opened at Woodland View, the first such facility in Scotland.

== Facilities ==
Woodland View has 13 separate ward areas with 206 beds provided for patients.

== Accolades and recognition ==
Soon within the hospital opening, Woodland View has been recognised with various awards for its pioneering approaches and design. These awards include the Building Better Healthcare Award, Best Mental Health Development 2016 and the European Healthcare Design Mental Health Award 2017.

== See also ==
- NHS Ayrshire and Arran
- Ayrshire Central Hospital
