= Woldingham School =

Coordinates: 51°16′33″N 0°03′07″W

Woldingham
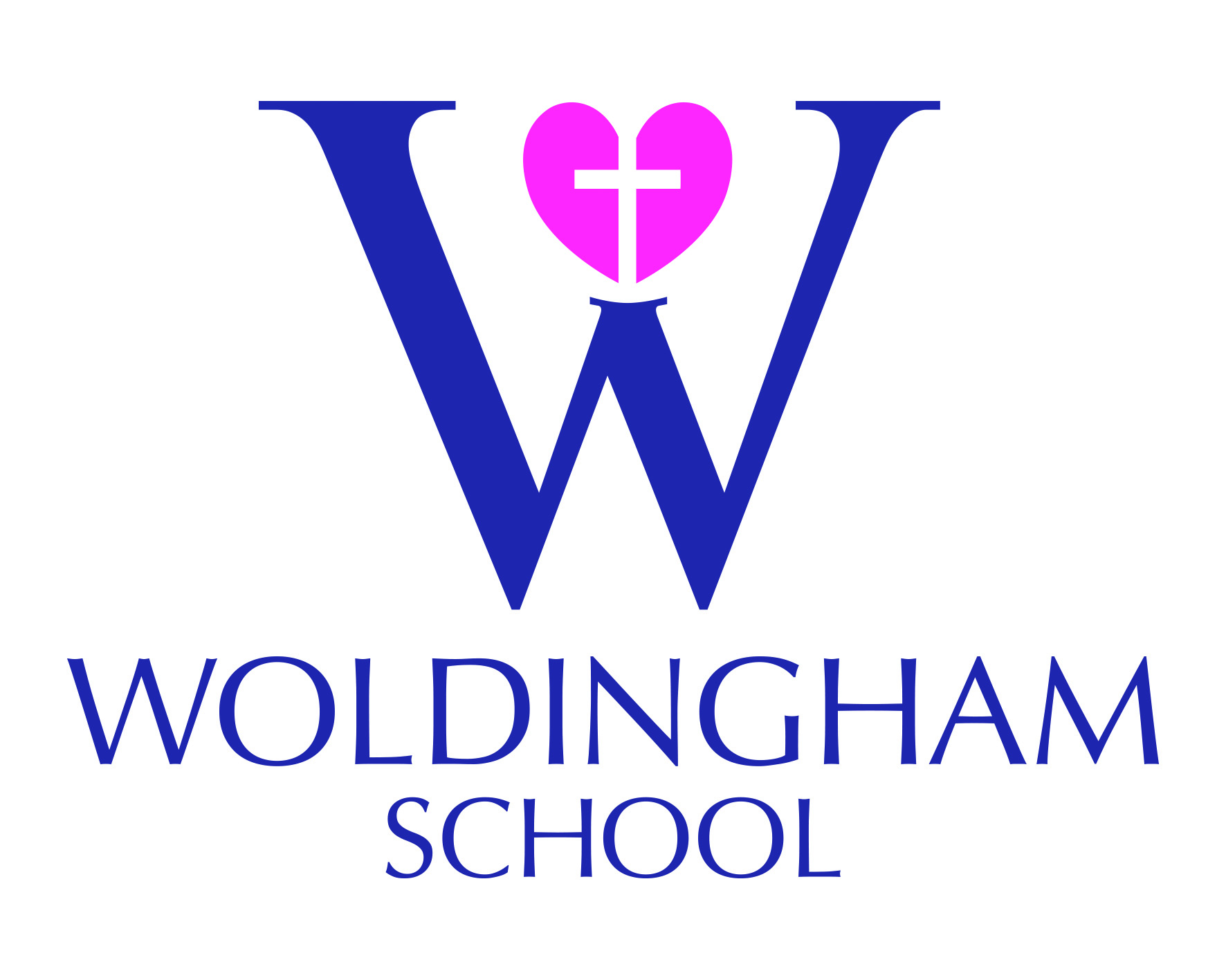

Location
- Marden Park; Woldingham, Surrey, CR3 7YA; England

Information
- Type: Independent school Boarding and day school
- Religious affiliation: Roman Catholic
- Established: 1842; 184 years ago
- Local authority: Caterham
- Department for Education URN: 125369 Tables
- Chair of Governors: Catharine Berwick
- Head: Sue Baillie
- Gender: Girls
- Age: 11 to 18
- Enrolment: 550
- Campus: 700 acres (280 ha)
- Houses: Barat; Digby; Duchesne; Stuart
- Website: www.woldinghamschool.co.uk

Woldingham School is an independent boarding and day school for girls, located in the former Marden Park of 700 acres (280 ha) outside the village of Woldingham, Surrey, in South East England.

It is a Roman Catholic school and a member of the global Network of Sacred Heart Schools.

== History ==
The school was founded as the Convent of the Sacred Heart in 1842 in Berrymead, London by the Society of the Sacred Heart; the first Convent of the Sacred Heart in England. The Society had been founded in France in 1800 by Madeleine Sophie Barat (canonized in 1925) immediately after the French Revolution (1789–1799). The first Sacred Heart school had opened in 1801 at Amiens, France; others were soon established in France and across Europe.

The Convent of the Sacred Heart moved to Roehampton, London, in 1850. Shortly after the 1939 outbreak of the Second World War, the school was evacuated, first to Newquay and later to Stanford Hall, near Rugby. Because the house at the Roehampton site was badly damaged during a 1941 air raid and later had to be demolished, the school decided, at the end of the war, to find a new location. Marden Park was purchased by the Society in 1945, and the school moved in one year later. Early in the 1980s, the Society decided to commit the school to lay management under the trusteeship of the Society. In 1984, Philomena Dineen was appointed first lay Head of School for the newly renamed Woldingham School; she took up her duties in January 1985.

== Campus ==
At over 200 hectares (490 acres), Woldingham has a campus that covers a large expanse of countryside, with sports facilities including squash courts, a fitness studio, a dance and gymnastics studio, an indoor tennis dome, an indoor swimming pool, outdoor courts and pitches and an all-weather pitch.

== Accommodation structure and House system ==
Girls in different year-groups live in different boarding houses: Marden House (Years 7 and 8, i.e. 11- to 13-year-olds), Main House (Years 9, 10 and 11, i.e. 13- to 16-year-olds). Sixth Form girls are accommodated in Berwick House and Shanley House, named respectively after Dr Edward Berwick, Chairman of Governors (1989–1995) and Sister Claire Shanley, Mistress General (1947–1968). On entering the school, girls are placed into one of four house tutor groups named after four nuns who were influential figures in the development of the Society. They are Saint Madeleine Sophie Barat, who founded the Society; Saint Rose Philippine Duchesne; Mother Janet Stuart; and Mother Mabel Digby.

Woldingham educates girls between age 11 to 18 who can join the school at ages 11, 12, 13 or 16, i.e. at any stage in the junior school (Marden House) or upon entering senior school (Main House). Girls can also join after completing the General Certificate of Secondary Education and enter straight into the Sixth Form.

== School fee fixing scandal ==
The school was involved in the Independent school fee fixing scandal in the mid-2000s. On 20 November 2006, the Office of Fair Trading (OFT) announced its decision following a 2005–2006 investigation into allegations that fifty of England's top independent schools, including Woldingham, had broken competition law (section 2[1] of the Competition Act 1998) by sharing information about fees via the so-called "Sevenoaks Survey". The OFT made no finding as to whether there was an effect on the fee levels of the schools concerned. The schools agreed to pay nominal penalties of £10,000 each, a reduced penalty in view of a number of exceptional features in the case: a voluntary admission had been made, the bodies were all non-profit making charities and they had set up a £3 million educational trust fund for those who had attended the schools in the relevant period.

This situation came about as a result of a dispute between the U.K. Charity Commission for England and Wales, which regulates the behaviour of U.K. charitable organizations, and the Office of Fair Trading, responsible for profit-making businesses. Although U.K. charities are required to publish financial and other information, U.K. businesses are not allowed to collaborate to set prices. The U.K.Competition Act 1998, which regulates the behaviour of businesses, was altered in 2000 to place independent schools – which are charities – in the same category as businesses as far as exchange of financial information is concerned.

== Notable former pupils ==
=== Convent of the Sacred Heart, Roehampton ===
All of those listed attended the school for at least one term and the names used are those by which they are best known:

- Evelyn Anthony, writer
- Eunice Kennedy Shriver, philanthropist
- Candy Atherton, politician
- Sonia Brownell, editor and wife of George Orwell
- Dame Mary Douglas, social anthropologist
- Tessa Fraser who became Lady Keswick
- Vivien Leigh (1920), actress
- Maureen O'Sullivan, actress
- Valerie Hunter Gordon, inventor of the disposable nappy
- Princess Elisabeth, Duchess of Hohenberg (Luxembourg)
- Princess Irmingard of Bavaria (1936)
- Princess Maria Adelgunde of Hohenzollern
- Princess Marie-Adélaïde of Luxembourg
- Antonia White, writer

=== Woldingham School ===
- Carey Mulligan (2003), Academy Award-nominated actor
- Emma Corrin (2014), award-winning actor known for playing Diana, Princess of Wales in The Crown as well as subsequent film and television roles
- Emma Greenwell (2008), British-American actress
- Moet Abebe (2007), Nigerian VJ
- Sofia Ellar, singer-songwriter
- Princess Theodora of Greece and Denmark (2001)
- Florence Brudenell-Bruce (2003), lingerie model and socialite
- Tilly Bagshawe, journalist and writer
- Lady Isabella Hervey (2000), socialite, model and actor
- Suzanne Bertish (1969), actor
- Artemis Cooper, writer
- Clarissa Dickson Wright (expelled), celebrity chef and former barrister
- Leslie Ferrar, treasurer to Charles, Prince of Wales
- Lucy Ferry née Helmore, socialite
- Marsha Fitzalan, actor
- Tanya Hamilton (née Nation), Marchioness of Hamilton
- Dillie Keane (expelled), actor, singer and comedian
- Louise Mensch (1989), Conservative MP for Corby (2010–2012), novelist (as Louise Bagshawe)
- Helen Whately, Conservative MP for Faversham and Mid Kent
- Caroline Wyatt (1984), BBC news journalist
- Caroline Waldegrave, cookery writer and president of the Hospital Caterers Association

== See also ==
- List of Schools of the Sacred Heart
