= Peggy Boyd =

Scottish nurse (1905–1999)

Peggy Boyd (9 November 1905 – 21 September 1999) was one of Scotland's first air ambulance nurses, serving in this role during World War II.

She was a trained nurse and midwife. She set up a nursing home in Paisley, Scotland.

== Early life ==
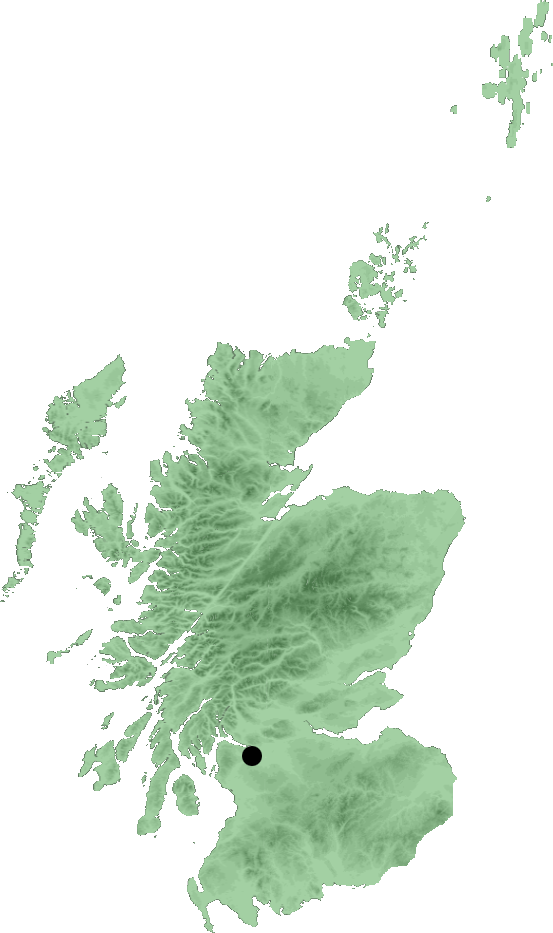
Paisley, Scotland

Boyd was born in Maybole, South Ayrshire, as Maggie Paton Davidson Boyd. Penny Boyd was her parents' sixth child. She had six siblings and was the daughter of Jessie Paton, and James Boyd, a plumber. Boyd qualified as a midwife in 1932 after training as a nurse at the Biggart Hospital in Prestwick and the Royal Alexandra Infirmary in Paisley.

== Achievements in nursing ==
With Jane Gilmour Govan (1895–1982), Boyd founded the Paisley Trained Nurses Association which in turn became the Ashtrees maternity nursing home.

The pair went on to become the first Scottish Air Ambulance Nurses. Boyd's first flight was on 4 March 1938 when she flew with a child who was suffering from appendicitis. She flew with the child from Islay, in the Inner Hebrides. The air ambulances often make flights in poor weather conditions.

Before this, local district nurses on remote islands had accompanied patients to the mainland. However, nurses then had to make their way back to the islands, which took several days. As such, the Medical Officer of Health for Argyllshire arranged for mainland nurses to be flown out to the islands and then accompany patients back to the mainland. Before 1948, an air ambulance flight was not publicly financed; rather the expense fell to the patient.

Boyd is also recorded as flying with a patient suffering from brucellosis.

== World War II ==
From 1939–1941, after the outbreak of World War II, Peggy Boyd and Jean Govan continued in their roles as air ambulance nurses. Windows of the plane had to be painted black or covered in line with Blitz regulations and a military permit was required to allow the air ambulances to fly.

In 1941, Boyd and Govan returned to their roles in their nursing home, as a result of the lack of qualified nurses at the time. The nursing home continued to run until 1951.

Until 1993, nurses from the Southern General Hospital in Glasgow volunteered for the service to provide the air ambulance provision.

== Awards and recognition ==
Boyd was to receive an OBE for her work, however, she declined when she learnt that Jean Govan had not been offered an OBE.

== Later life ==
After 1951, Boyd spent time in New Zealand. Upon her return to Scotland, she worked as a health visitor in Ayrshire until her retirement.
