= Davidson Hospital =

- NHS Ayrshire and Arran
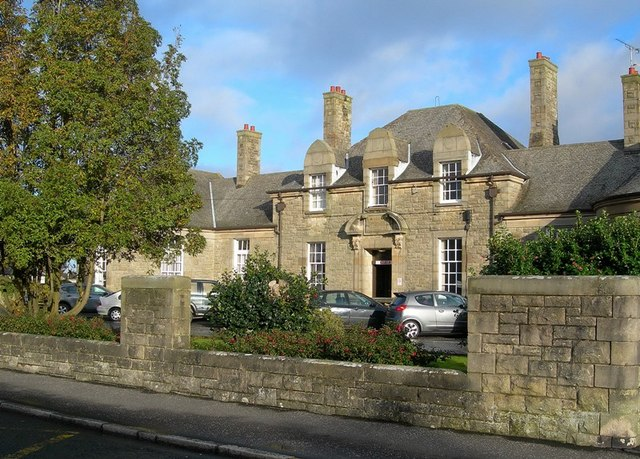
- Davidson Hospital

- Shown in South Ayrshire

Geography
- Location: Girvan, South Ayrshire, Scotland
- Coordinates: 55.2424°N 4.8496°W

Organisation
- Care system: NHS Scotland
- Type: General

History
- Founded: 1921
- Closed: 2010

Links
- Lists: Hospitals in Scotland

The Davidson Hospital was a health facility in Girvan, South Ayrshire, Scotland. It was managed by NHS Ayrshire and Arran. It remains a Category B listed building.

== History ==
The facility was financed by a gift from Thomas, James and Janet Davidson, in memory of their mother, Margaret Davidson. It was designed by Watson, Salmond and Gray and opened in 1921. It joined the National Health Service in 1948 and a new out‑patients' department was added in 1970. After services transferred to the new Girvan Community Hospital, the Davidson Hospital closed in March 2010. It was subsequently placed on the Buildings at Risk Register.
