= Ballochmyle House =

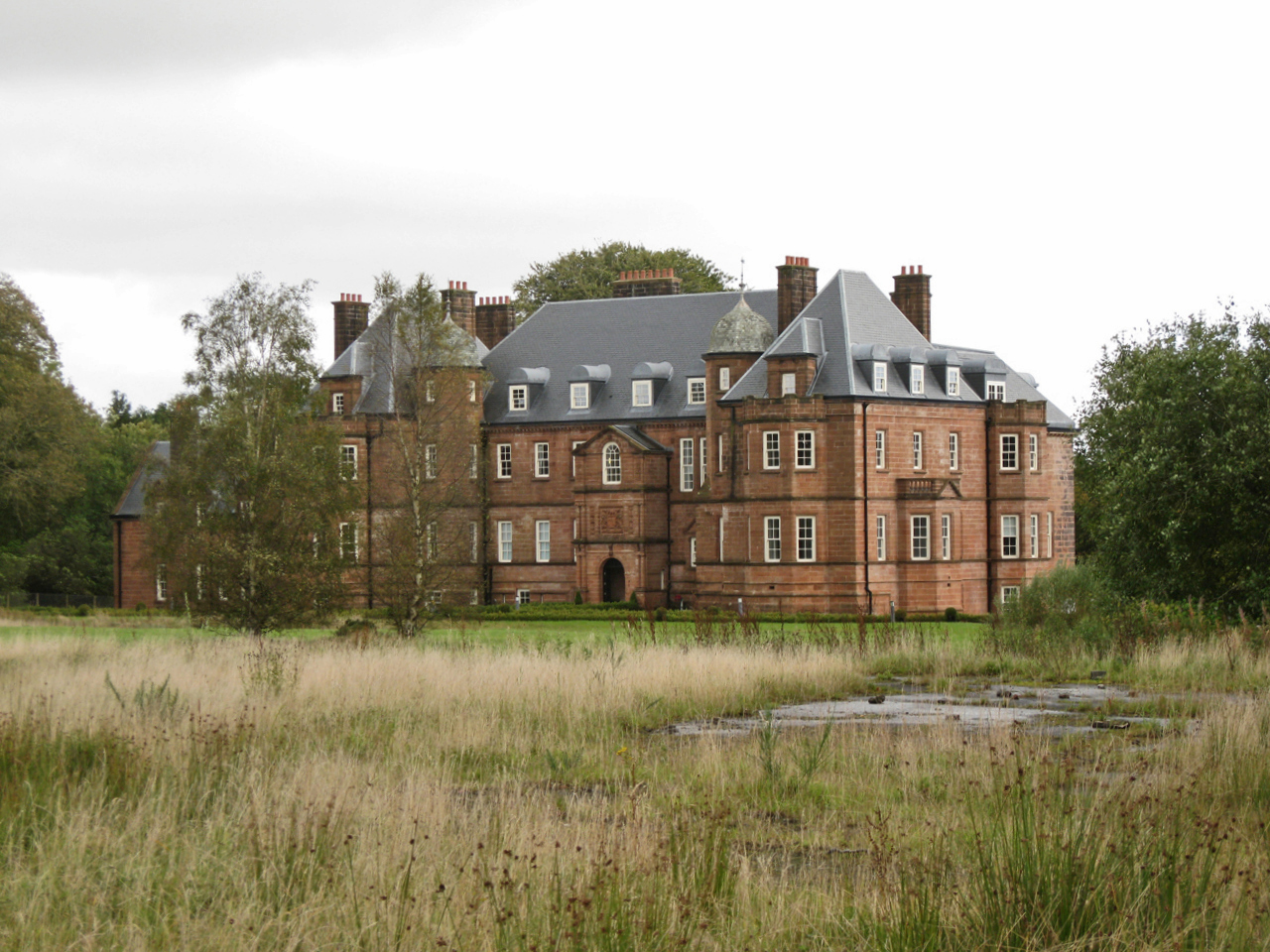
- Ballochmyle House

- Location in East Ayrshire

General information
- Type: Mansion
- Location: Catrine, East Ayrshire, Scotland
- Coordinates: 55.5086°N 4.3432°W
- Completed: 1760
- Renovated: 1887; 2009
- Renovation cost: £5m

Technical details
- Material: red sandstone

Design and construction
- Architect: Robert Adam
- Other designers: Hew Montgomerie Wardrop; George Mackie Watson

Listed Building – Category B
- Designated: 12 June 1972
- Reference no.: LB14487

Ballochmyle Hospital
- NHS Ayrshire and Arran

Geography
- Location: Scotland

Organisation
- Care system: NHS
- Type: General hospital

History
- Founded: 1939
- Closed: 2000

Links
- Lists: Hospitals in Scotland

Ballochmyle House is an 18th-century country house near Catrine in East Ayrshire, Scotland that was the seat of the Alexander of Ballochmyle family. From 1939 to 2000, it was the location of Ballochmyle Hospital operated by NHS Ayrshire and Arran. Following a £5m restoration that began in 2009, it was converted to luxury flats.

== History ==
Ballochmyle House was designed by Robert Adam and completed in 1760 before being substantially rebuilt to a design by Hew Montgomerie Wardrop with assistance from George Mackie Watson in 1887. It was the home of Wilhelmina Alexander whose lasting fame derives from being Robert Burns's 'The Bonnie Lass o'Ballochmyle' in the song of that title.

In 1939, Ballochmyle Hospital was established as one of seven Emergency Hospital Service facilities for military casualties when Ballochmyle House was requisitioned from Sir Claud Alexander. The wooden huts which had been erected during the war continued to be used for civilian purposes after the war. After services transferred to East Ayrshire Community Hospital, Ballochmyle Hospital closed in 2000. The house has since been converted into luxury apartments and the site redeveloped for residential use.

== See also ==
- List of listed buildings in Mauchline, East Ayrshire

== Sources ==
- Westwood, Peter J. (2008). Who's Who in the World of Robert Burns. Robert Burns World Federation. ISBN 978-1-899316-98-4.
