= Leslie Ferrar =

Leslie Jane Ferrar, CVO (born 20 July 1955) was Treasurer to Charles, Prince of Wales from January 2005 until July 2012.

Since leaving the Royal Household, she has taken on a number of Non-Executive and Trustee roles. These include

- Non-executive director of HMRC's Audit and Risk Committee.
- Non-executive director of Penna Consulting (until 2016).
- Non-executive director of Secure Income REIT plc
- Non-executive Chairwoman of The Risk Advisory Group
- Trustee of the Roman Catholic Archdiocese of Westminster
- Non-exec director of The Rothschild Foundation
- Trustee of Breakthrough Breast Cancer (Until 2015).
- Non-exec Director of Institute for the Works of Religion (aka The Vatican Bank)

Notes: Penna Consulting was bought by Adecco www.adecco.co.uk in 2016. Breakthrough Breast Cancer is now Breast Cancer Now after merging with Breast Cancer Campaign

She has served as a director of Duchy Originals and a trustee of the National Eczema Society.

Leslie Ferrar is the granddaughter of the author Bruce Marshall and Dr. William Ferrar (D.Sc.) former principal of Hertford College, Oxford. She was educated at Woldingham School and St Mary's College, Durham where she graduated in Chemistry. In 1996 she attended Harvard Business School's Program for Management Development.

She joined KPMG in 1976, becoming a partner in 1988. Prior to joining the Prince of Wales office in January 2005, she ran the International Expatriates Services group at KPMG as Executive Tax Partner.

She was appointed Commander of the Royal Victorian Order (CVO) in the 2012 Birthday Honours.

She married her longtime partner, David Unwin at the Lady Chapel, Westminster Cathedral on 10 June 2011.
