= University Hospital Ayr =

- NHS Ayrshire and Arran
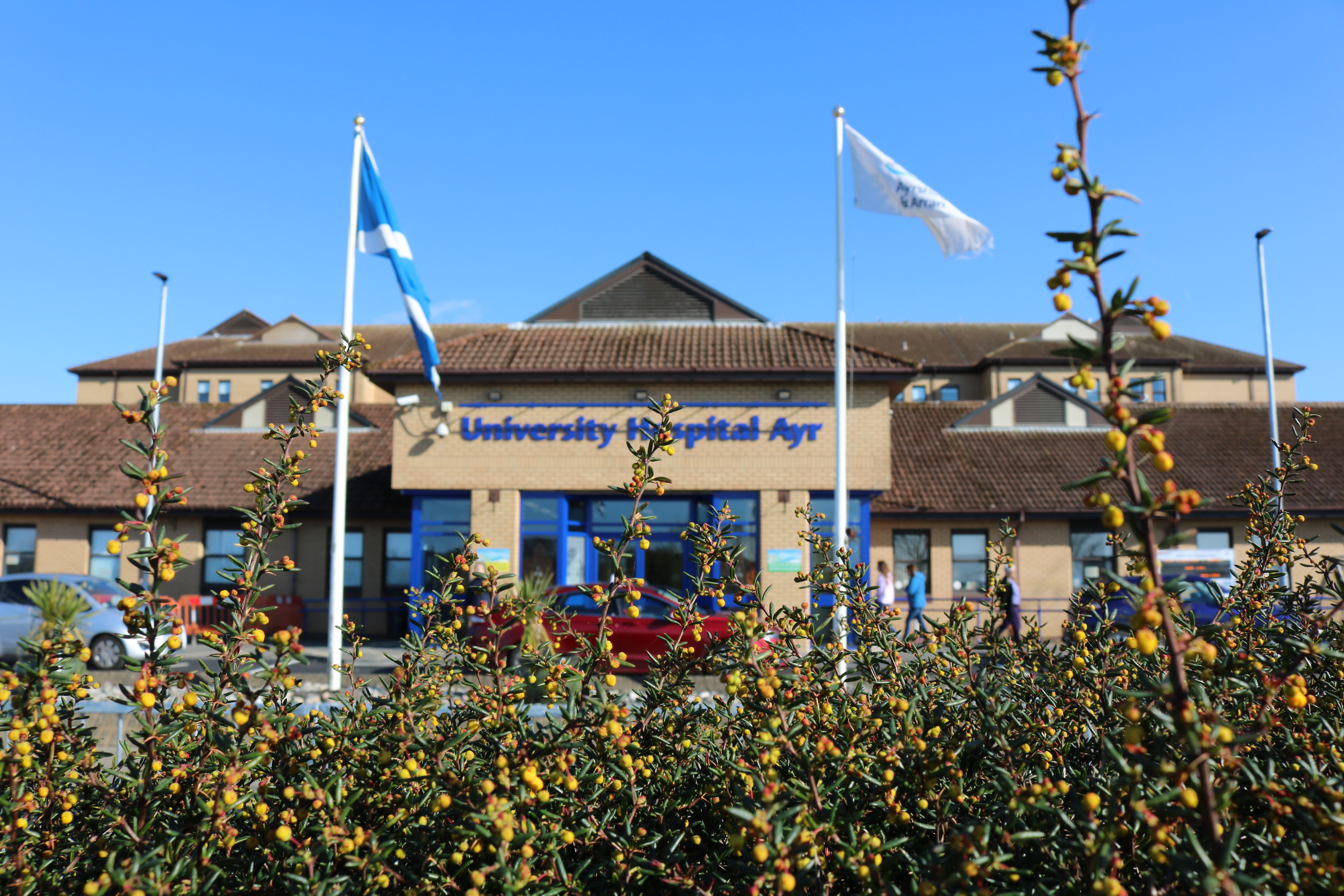
- University Hospital Ayr

- Shown in South Ayrshire

Geography
- Location: Ayr, South Ayrshire, Scotland
- Coordinates: 55°25′50″N 4°35′35″W

Organisation
- Care system: NHS Scotland
- Type: District general
- Affiliated university: University of the West of Scotland

Services
- Emergency department: Yes Accident & Emergency
- Beds: 333

History
- Founded: 1991

Links
- Website: University Hospital Ayr
- Lists: Hospitals in Scotland

University Hospital Ayr is a general hospital on the outskirts of Ayr, Scotland. It covers a catchment area of approximately 100,000 people in South Ayrshire and is managed by NHS Ayrshire and Arran.

== History ==
The hospital, which replaced the Ayr County Hospital, Heathfield Hospital and Seafield Children's Hospital, was built on part of the site of Ailsa Hospital and opened as the Ayr Hospital by then-Prime Minister John Major in 1991.

In March 2012 it became University Hospital Ayr as a result of the partnership with the University of the West of Scotland.

The accident and emergency department had been due to close with services being transferred to Crosshouse Hospital in Kilmarnock. However, the incoming SNP government cancelled the planned closure in June 2007.

== Services ==
The hospital has 333 beds and provides a number of services including ophthalmology and audiology.
