= Heathfield Hospital =

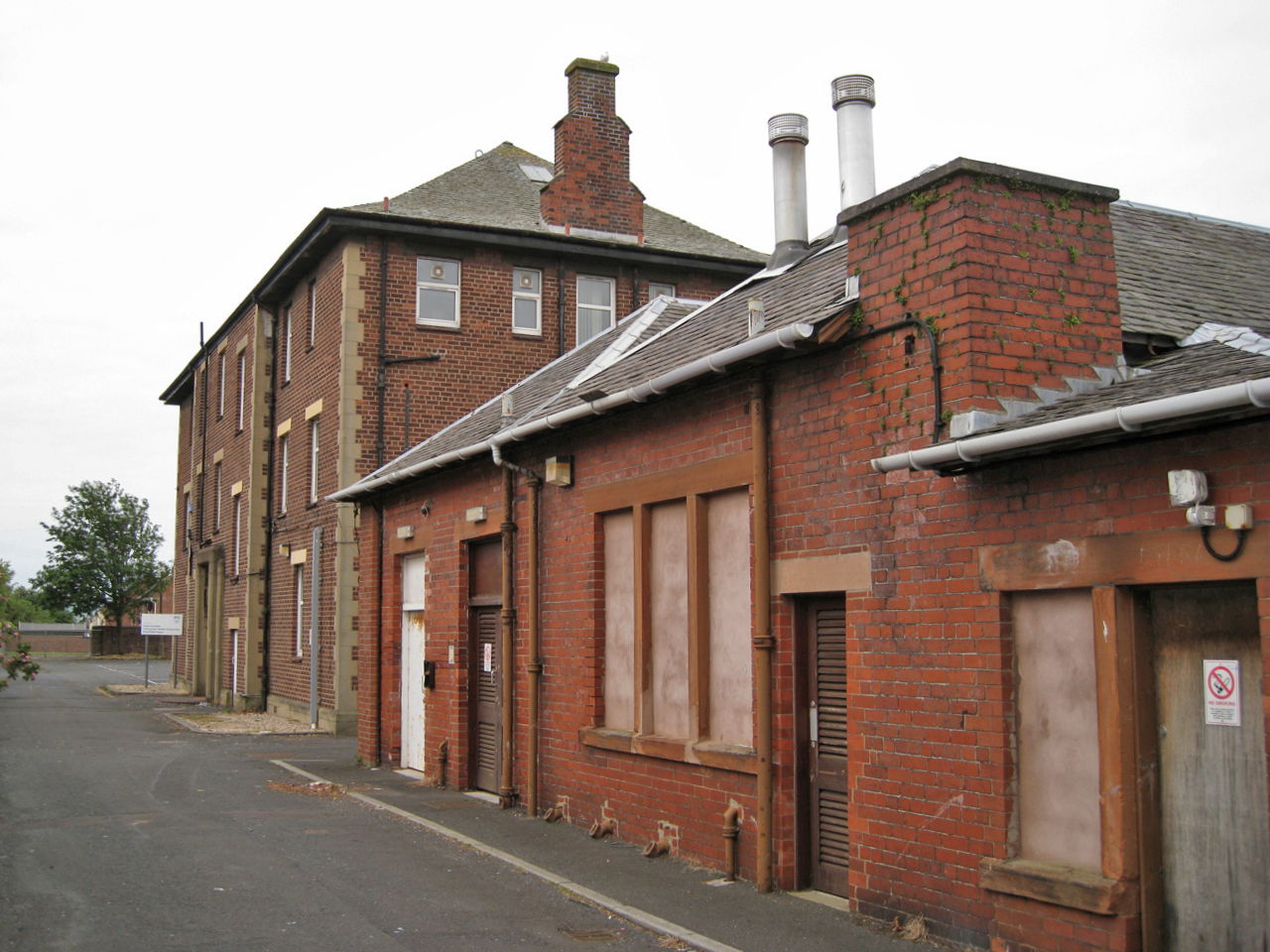
- Heathfield Hospital

- Shown in South Ayrshire

Geography
- Location: Heathfield Road, Ayr, South Ayrshire, Scotland
- Coordinates: 55.4820°N 4.6148°W

Organisation
- Care system: NHS Scotland
- Type: General

History
- Founded: 1905
- Closed: 1991

Links
- Lists: Hospitals in Scotland

Heathfield Hospital was a health facility in Heathfield Road, Ayr, South Ayrshire, Scotland.

== History ==
The facility, which was designed by John Eaglesham (1855–1922), opened as the Burgh Fever Hospital in June 1905. It joined the National Health Service in 1948 and a large outpatients' department was built on an adjacent site in 1962. After services transferred to the new Ayr Hospital, the inpatient facilities at Heathfield Hospital closed in 1991 and the buildings were subsequently demolished. The out‑patients' department became known as the Heathfield Clinic and continued to provide services until 2015 when it also closed and was also subsequently demolished.

The regional headquarters for the Scottish Ambulance Service serving south-west Scotland (Ayrshire, Dumfries and Galloway) and west South Lanarkshire remains located on an adjacent site in Maryfield Road.
