= Arran War Memorial Hospital =

- NHS Ayrshire and Arran
- Shown on Arran

Geography
- Location: Lamlash, Isle of Arran, KA27 8LE, Scotland
- Coordinates: 55.543009°N 5.115292°W

Organisation
- Care system: NHS Scotland

Services
- Beds: 17

History
- Founded: 1922

Links
- Website: www.nhsaaa.net/services/hospitals/arran-war-memorial-hospital/
- Lists: Hospitals in Scotland

The Arran War Memorial Hospital is a healthcare facility located in Lamlash on the Isle of Arran, Scotland. It has seventeen staffed beds for in-patient medical care, x-ray facilities, and is the base for a community maternity unit. It is managed by NHS Ayrshire and Arran.

== History ==
In 1919 a committee was formed to establish a cottage hospital. Archibald Cook designed the building the following year. A range of gifts and donations allowed the hospital to be established with two four-bedded wards, two single rooms, a consulting room and an operating theatre. An official opening ceremony was held on 8 July 1922. A maternity ward was added in 1930. During the Second World War the hospital took civilian and military casualties.

In 1948, following the formation of the NHS in Scotland, the hospital was run by the Board of Management for Isle of Arran Hospitals. In 1972, after some campaigning by the community, an eight-bed extension was built. In 1974 responsibility passed to North Ayrshire and Arran District of Ayrshire and Arran Health Board. Around 1980 a modern surgical theatre was installed and in 1981 a part-time general surgeon was appointed but within two years his hours were being reduced.

Two new single rooms were added in 2011. In July 2013, the health board commissioned a new biomass boiler, fuelled by woodchips from locally grown timber.

The dental facility at the hospital was refurbished and extended in 2013. There were ten births at the hospital in the year ended 31 March 2015.
