= Kilmarnock Infirmary =

Coordinates: 55°36′51″N 4°29′41″W

- NHS Scotland (1948–1982)
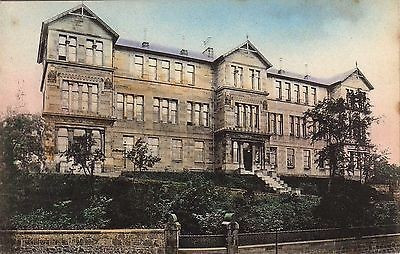
- Kilmarnock Infirmary

Geography
- Location: Wellington Street, Kilmarnock, Ayrshire, Scotland

Organisation
- Type: General
- Affiliated university: University of Glasgow

Services
- Beds: 504

History
- Founded: 1868
- Closed: 1982

Kilmarnock Infirmary was a general hospital in Kilmarnock, Ayrshire in Scotland. Opened in 1868, it was designed by renowned Kilmarnock architect William Atkinson Railton. In 1948, the National Health Service (NHS Scotland) was established, meaning Kilmarnock Infirmary had come under national control. Following hospital services for Kilmarnock and the surrounding population being transferred to Crosshouse Hospital in the early 1980s, Kilmarnock Infirmary closed in 1982.

== History ==
=== Construction and opening ===
Kilmarnock Infirmary opened in 1868 in Wellington Street, to meet the needs of the growing population in Kilmarnock. The original building was designed by the prolific Kilmarnock architect, William Atkinson Railton. The foundation stone was laid in September 1867 and the building opened in October 1868. A children's block and a nurses' training school were added in 1891. In 1923 it had a capacity of 130 beds.

=== Expansion ===
Built on land used by neighbouring Mount Pleasant House, following the opening of the Kilmarnock Infirmary, Mount Pleasant House began to be used for administrative duties and functions of the hospital, but was later demolished in order to clear land to allow for the new construction of additional wings to the main hospital building. A children's ward was added to the Kilmarnock Infirmary in 1891, totalling £4,100 to construct. The vast majority of the money used to construct the children's ward was donated to the project by Dowager Lady Howard de Walden. Additions to the ward occurred in 1893, followed by the creation of a new fevers block in 1899.

A further additional wards, as well as new dining rooms, kitchen, mortuary and administration block were opened at the hospital on 19 May 1923 by a Miss Finnie, after plans had to be postponed due to the outbreak of World War I. The 1923 expansion project was designed by Sir John Burrnett who had sought the advice and experience of Dr Mackintosh at the Western Infirmary in Glasgow, and used the information he had gained from their discussion to create his plans for the 1923 expansion. Following the expansion, the hospitals total bed capacity had increased to 130 beds being available for patients. Further expansions in the 1930s included the addition of a new recreation hall and lecture theatre.

=== Closure ===
After a new clock was completed in 1921, the original building became the nurses' home. Kilmarnock Infirmary was seen as a hospital which had become largely constrained by its small and prominent town centre location, and discussions began to commence to merge Kilmarnock Infirmary with Ayr County Hospital in a new building located on Grassyards Road in Kilmarnock. Plans eventually fell through, and the proposals were eventually abandoned due to the outbreak of World War II.

After services transferred to Crosshouse Hospital, Kilmarnock Infirmary closed in 1982. Following a period of remaining vacant due to refusal to demolish the infirmary building, it was eventually demolished together with the accident and emergency building in the late 1980s. Demolition occurred, despite there being plans to turn the site and building into a nursing home, but these proposals were not granted permission. The listed nurses' home building was demolished under a Dangerous Building Notice in September 1997, following the building suffering severe damage after a fire in 1994.

== Location ==
Kilmarnock Infirmary was situated upon the hillside at the bottom of Wellington Street in Kilmarnock. Mount Pleasant House was situated next to the main hospital building, with their land being used to construct the hospital. Following construction, Mount Pleasant House was initially used for administrative duties regarding the hospital.

== See also ==
- Kilmarnock; the town in which the hospital was located
- NHS Scotland; the health board created in 1948 which brought the hospital under national control
- Ayrshire; the geographical region in which both the hospital and Kilmarnock were located during the hospitals operational period
- Health care in Scotland
