= McEwan Hall =

Auditorium in Edinburgh

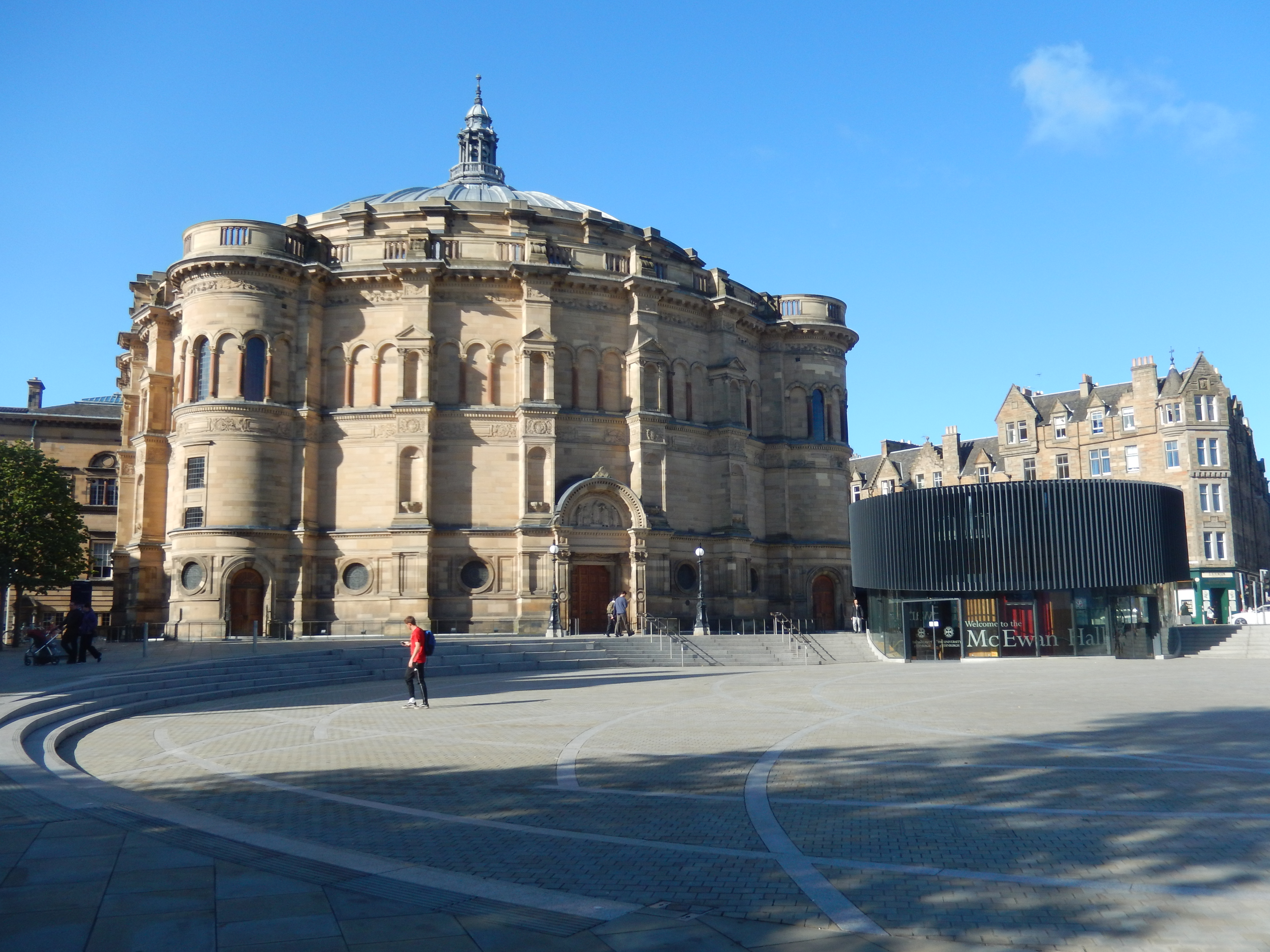
- McEwan Hall in 2019
- Interactive map of the McEwan Hall area

General information
- Architectural style: Italian Renaissance
- Location: Edinburgh, Scotland
- Coordinates: 55.94537°N 3.189479°W
- Completed: 1897
- Cost: £115,000 (£12.9 million today)
- Owner: University of Edinburgh

Design and construction
- Architect: Sir Robert Rowand Anderson

Listed Building – Category A
- Designated: 14 December 1966
- Reference no.: LB27993

McEwan Hall (Scottish Gaelic: Talla MhicEòghainn) is the graduation hall of the University of Edinburgh, in Edinburgh, Scotland. Designed by architect Sir Robert Rowand Anderson, it was funded by philanthropist William McEwan at a total cost of £115,000 (approx£. 12.9 million today). Completed in 1897, McEwan Hall today is a category A listed building.

== History ==
For more than 300 years after its founding in 1582, the university had no building specifically for graduations or other ceremonies. The university had made do with graduating students in classrooms, since the overall numbers were low. After the dramatic expansion in size brought on by the Universities (Scotland) Act 1858, the university was frequently forced to rent external venues for graduations, and consequently began to search for funding for a dedicated building in 1874. Initial designs for the new Medical School following a master plan by Sir Robert Rowand Anderson included a graduation hall, which was chiefly designed by Anderson's understudy George Mackie Watson. However, while the government approved the building of the Medical School, it vetoed the graduation hall.

After several years of further negotiations, philanthropist William McEwan—politician and owner of Fountain Brewery—offered to provide more than £100,000 to build the hall, as long as the university could find funds to buy the designated site. This was finally accomplished in 1887, and the university announced in 1888 that the hall would be named in honor of McEwan, who also received an honorary doctorate for his contributions.

== Architecture ==
The exterior of the D-shaped hall was completed in 1894, using sandstone from Prudham Quarry, Hexham in Northumberland. A tympanum over the main entrance shows a graduation ceremony; several niches along the exterior were designed to feature statues, but they were never filled.

The interior with its striking dome, finished in 1897, is built in Italian Renaissance-style, and features murals by painter William Mainwaring Palin. Palin's opulent decoration depicts figures representing the Arts and Sciences on the dome, while the centerpiece is a large allegory known as 'The Temple of Fame', which shows the enthroned goddesses of Science, Art, and Literature. The dome also features a biblical inscription: Wisdom is the principal thing, therefore get wisdom, and with all thy getting, get understanding. Exalt her and she shall bring thee to honour (Proverbs 4:7). William McEwan is depicted in one of the murals as an old man with a long gray beard and folded arms.

The McEwan Hall organ was built in 1897 by renowned organist and inventor Robert Hope-Jones; only one other organ built by Hope-Jones has survived in the UK. The organ has been rebuilt and modified on various occasions, but retains its "sumptuous and theatrically grand sound".

In 2015 the hall and nearby Bristo Square closed for refurbishment and reopened in time for the July 2017 graduations at a projected cost of £35 million. New heating, ventilation and lighting were integrated with the original interior and new seminar rooms created in the basement and below Bristo Square. One of the project's aims was to provide easy access to all areas, including the second floor gallery.

Today, McEwan Hall is used for all university graduations, but also examinations, lectures and public talks, some Edinburgh Festival Fringe events, and organ recitals.

== Gallery ==
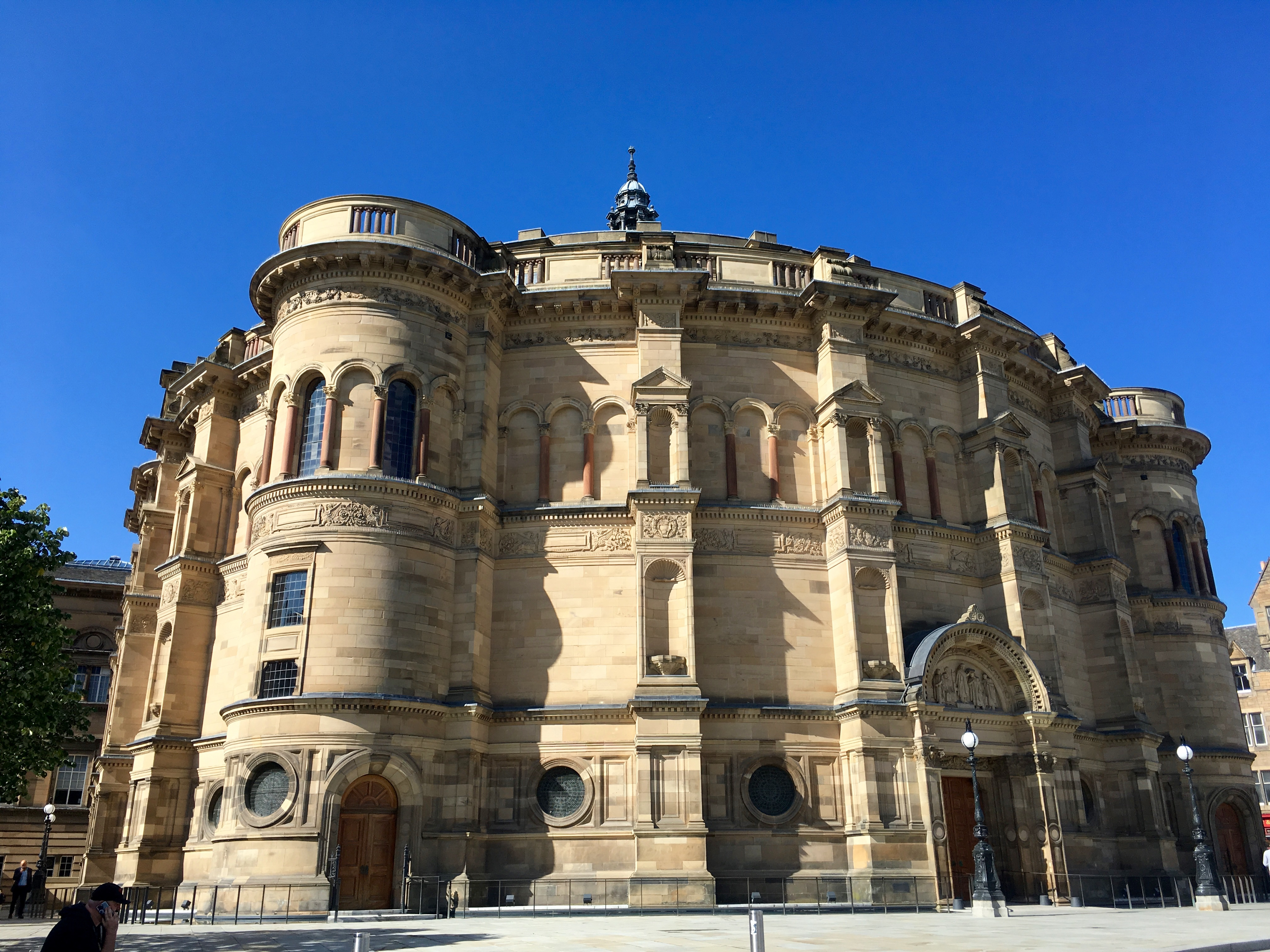
Exterior in 2018

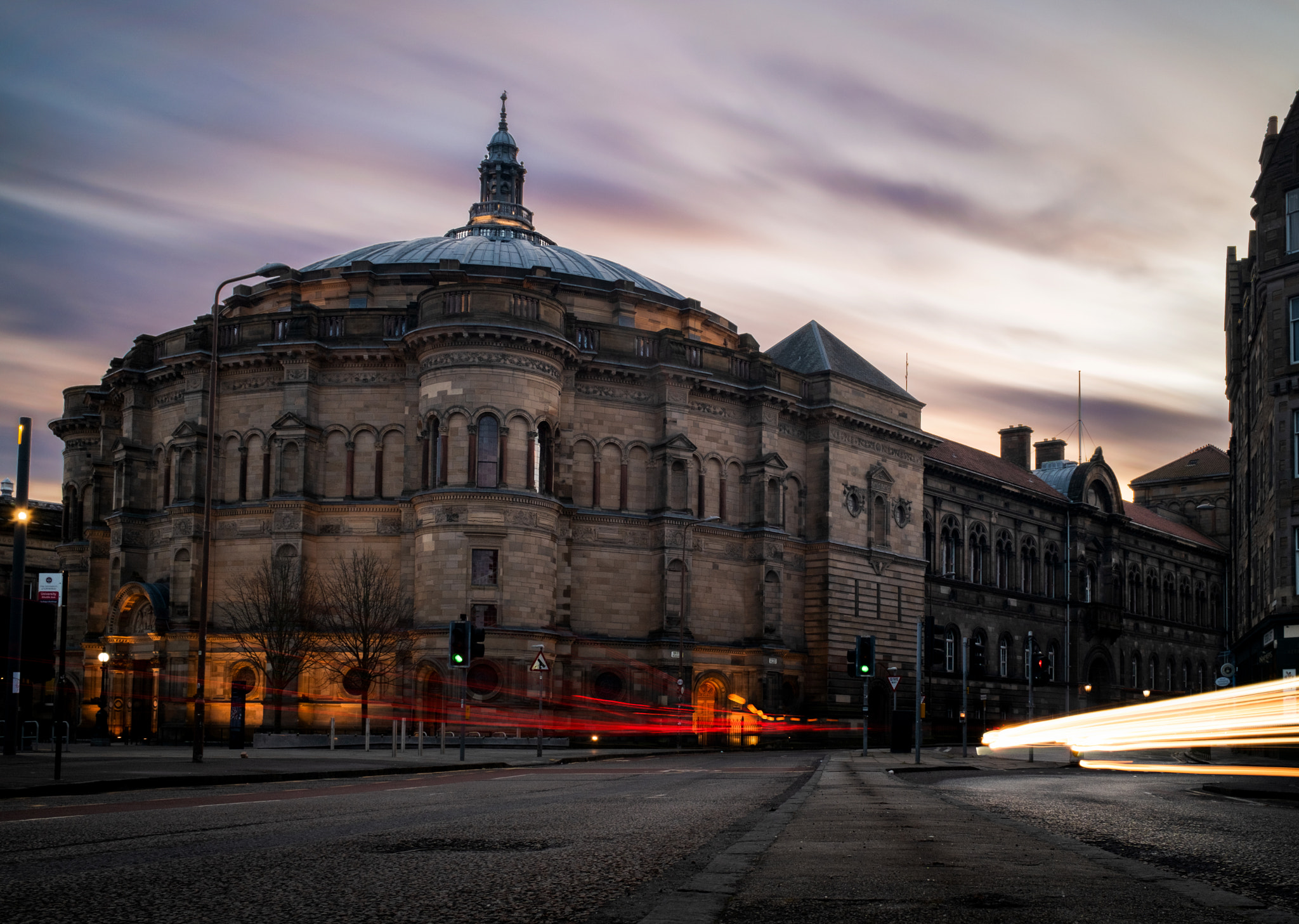
Street view with Medical School in background (2021)

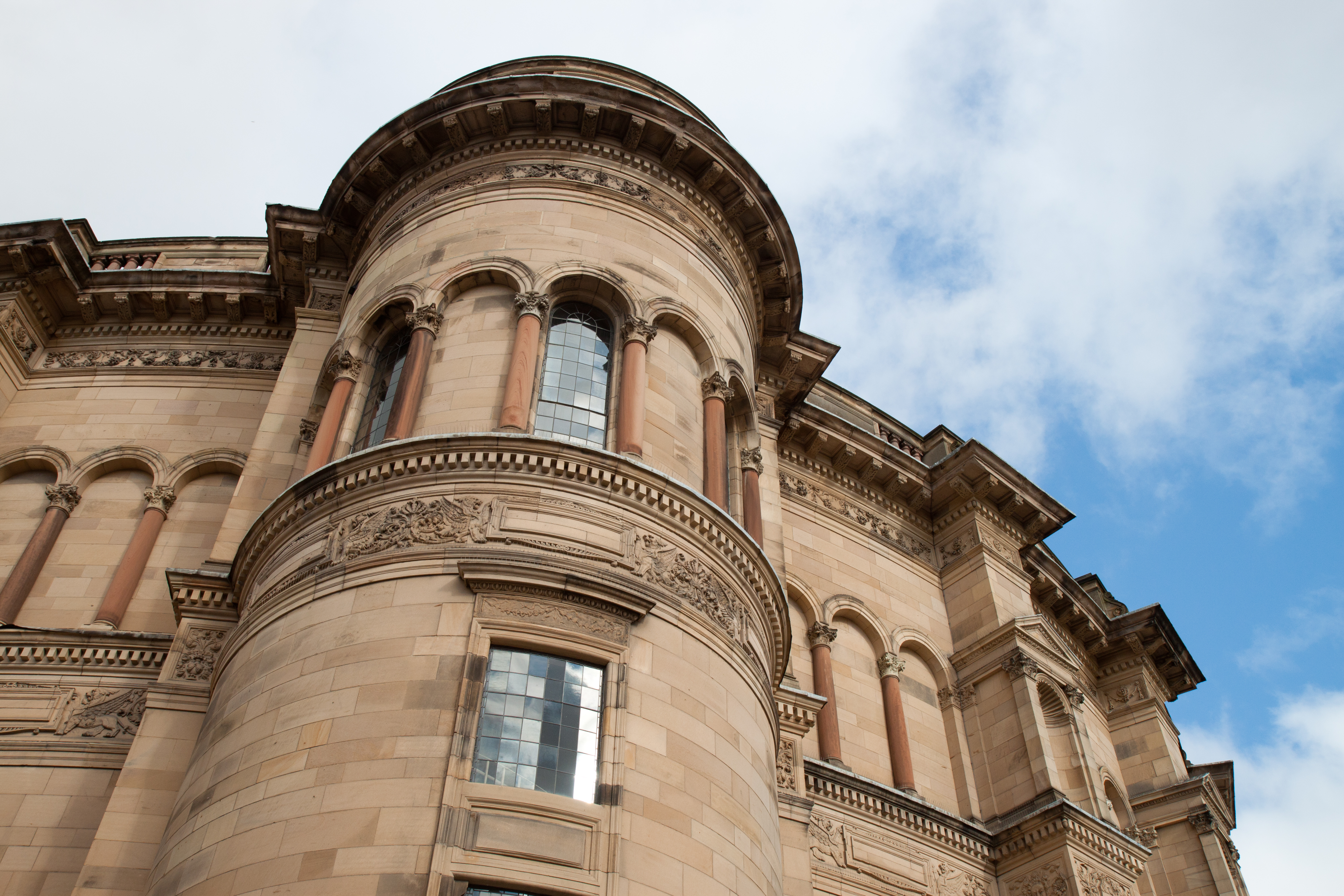
Exterior details (2011)

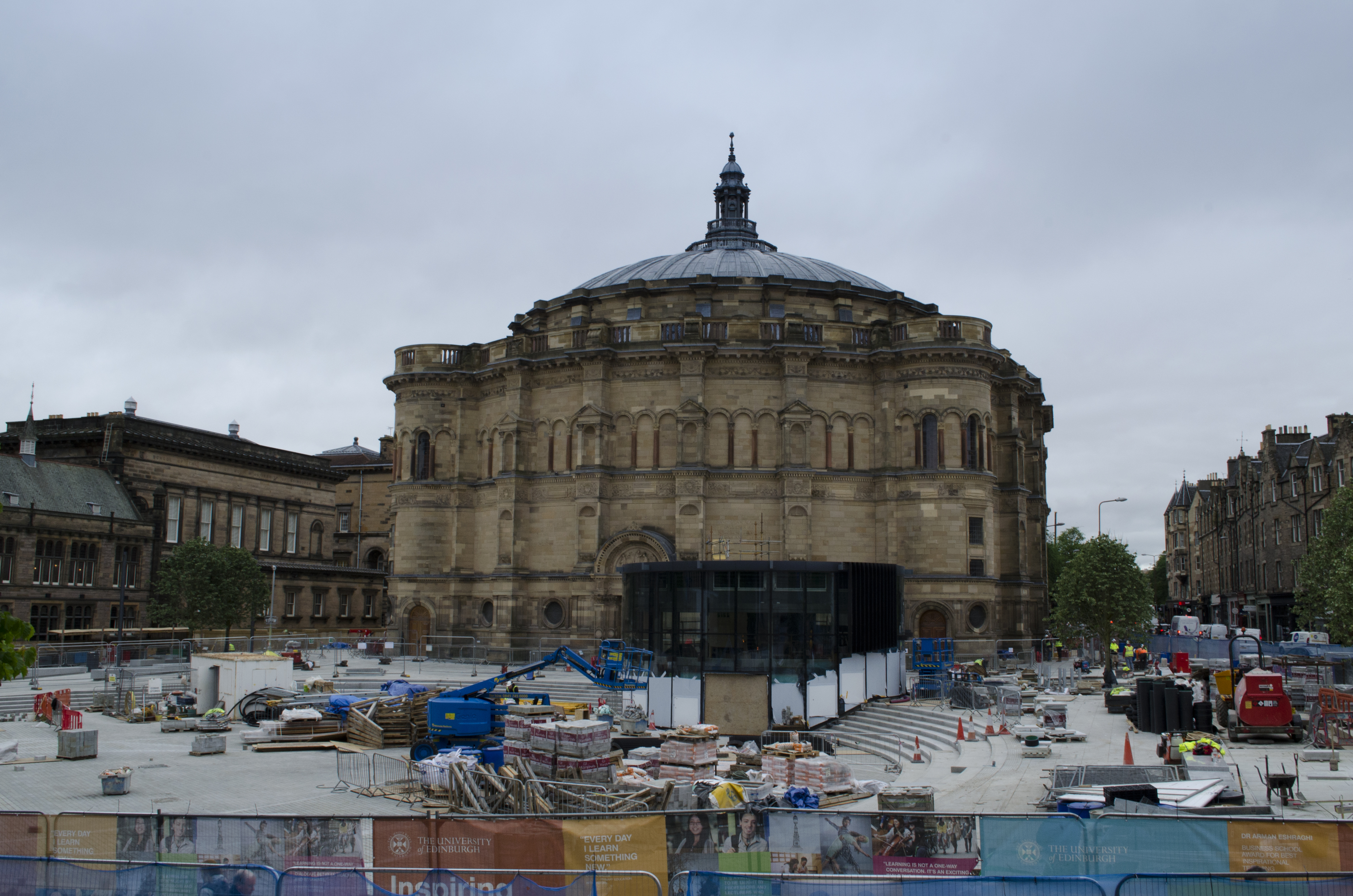
During latter stages of refurbishment of Bristo Square (2017)

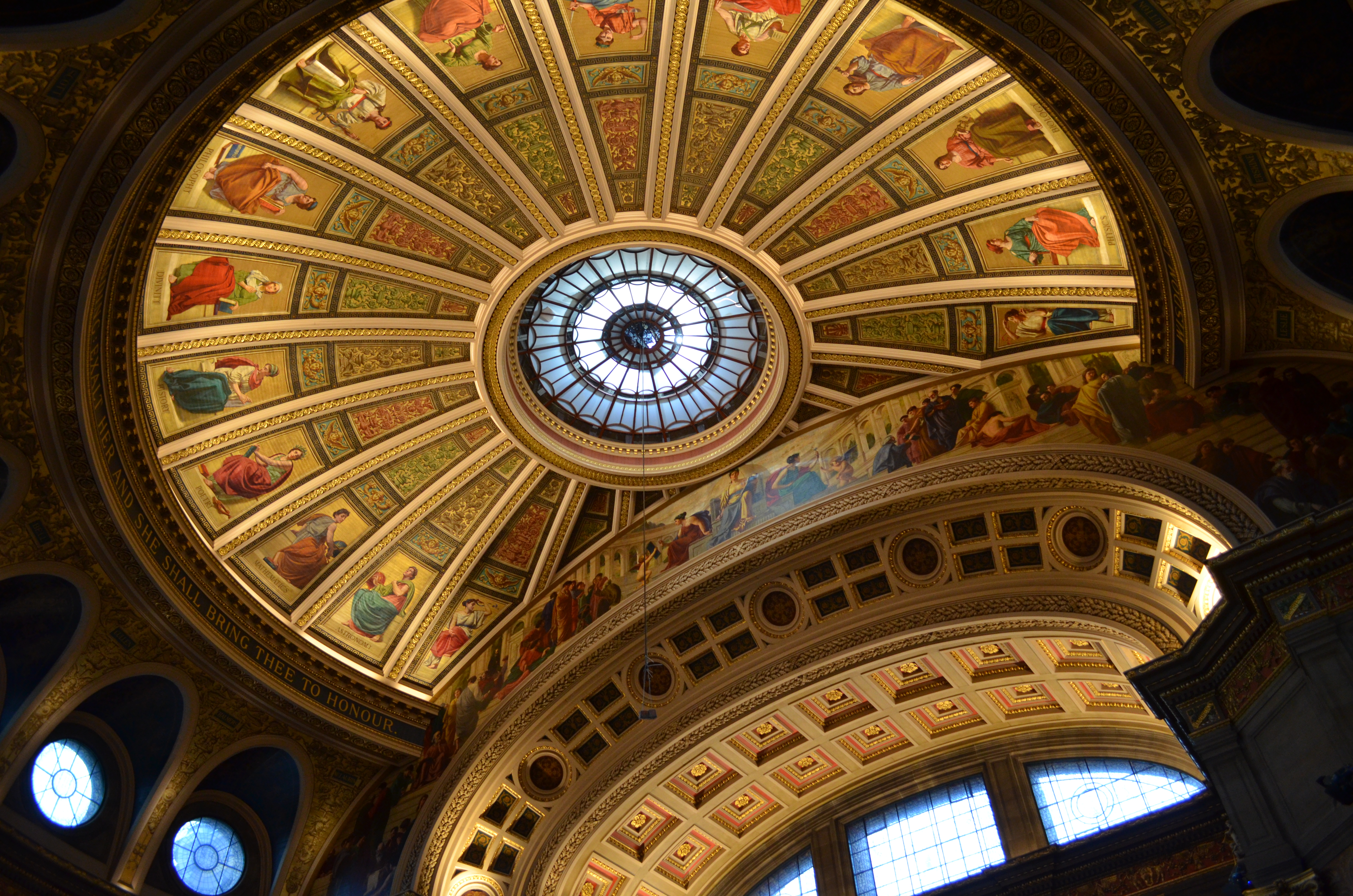
Restored dome (2017)

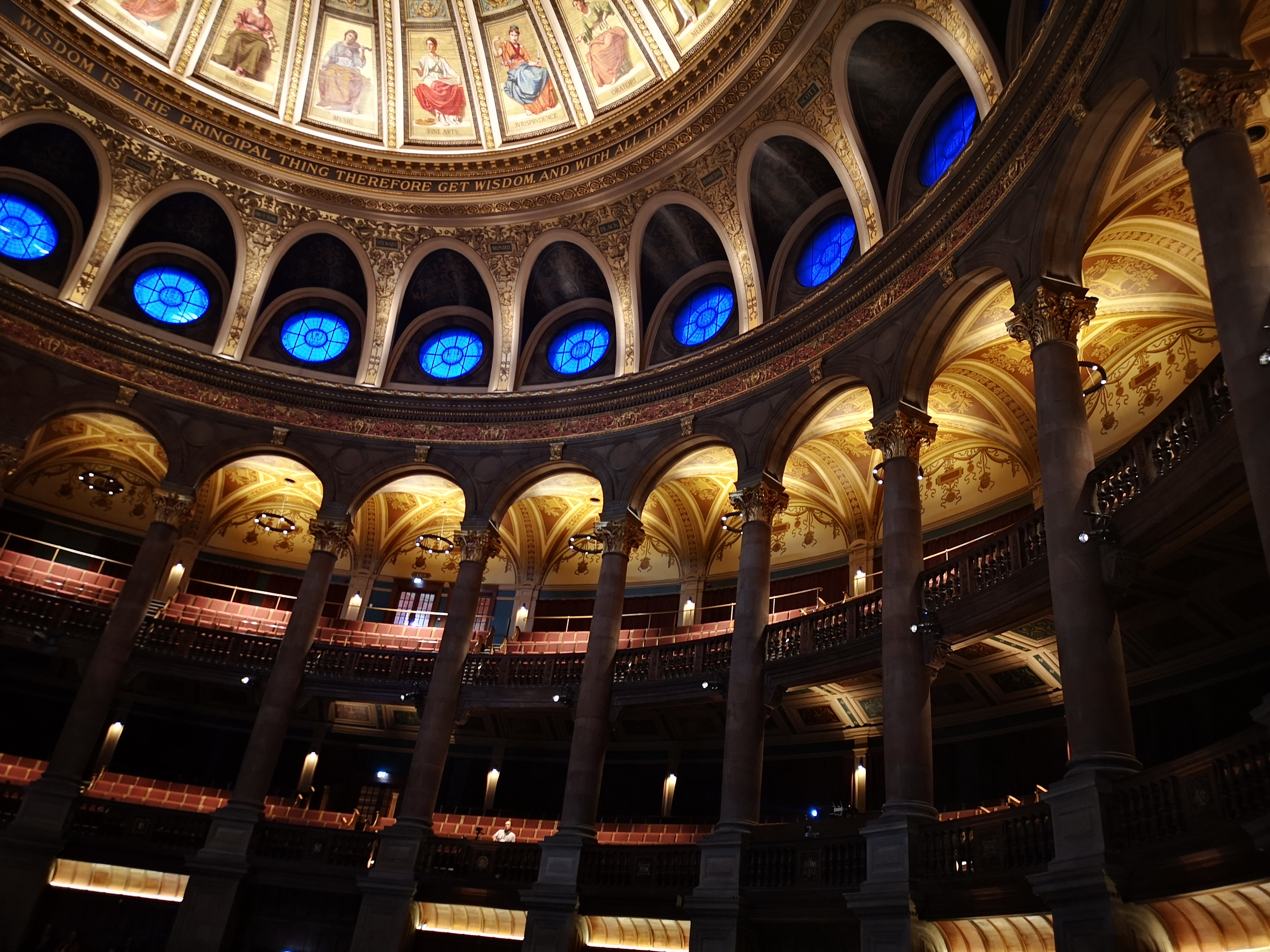
Restored interior (2017)

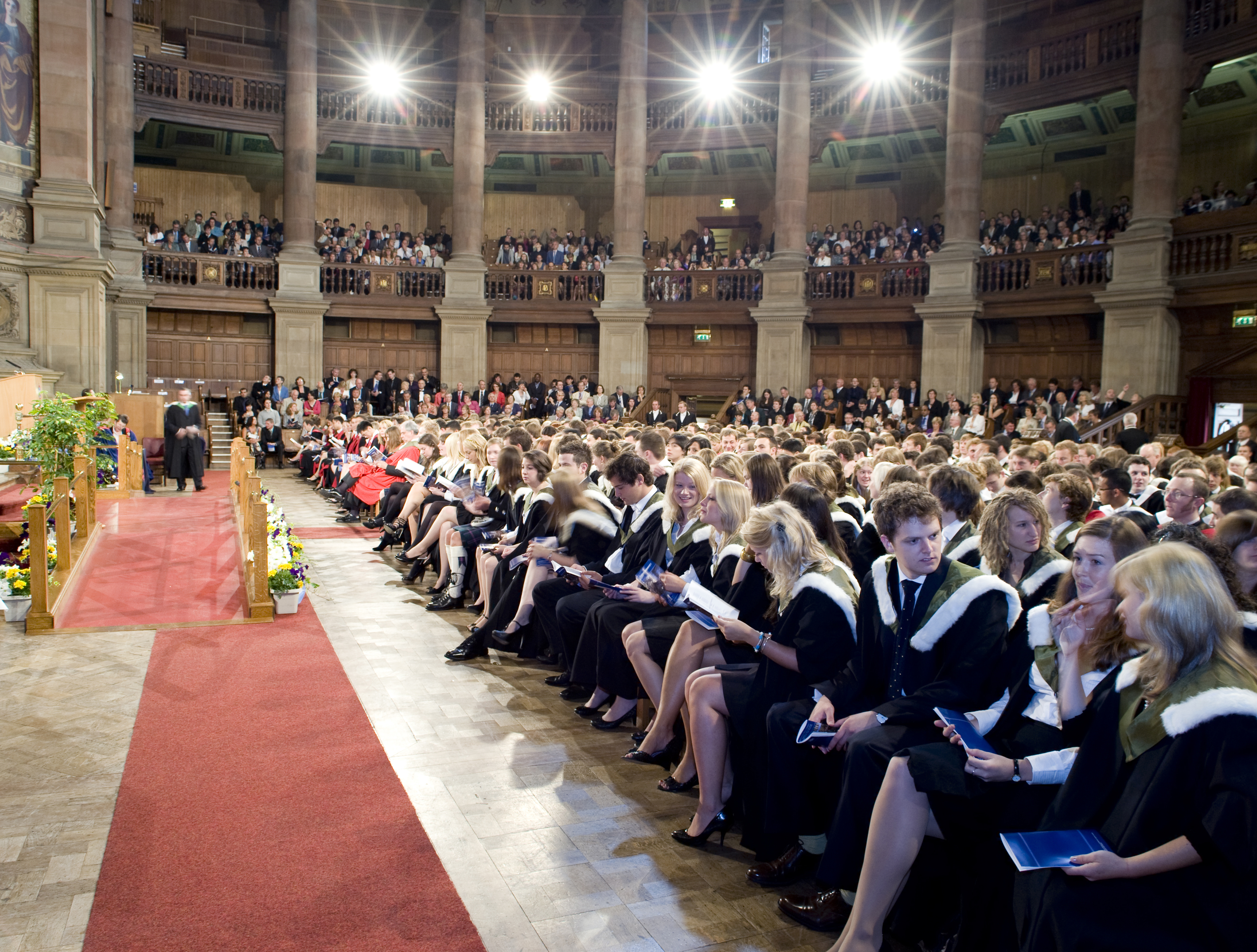
Interior during a graduation ceremony (2008)

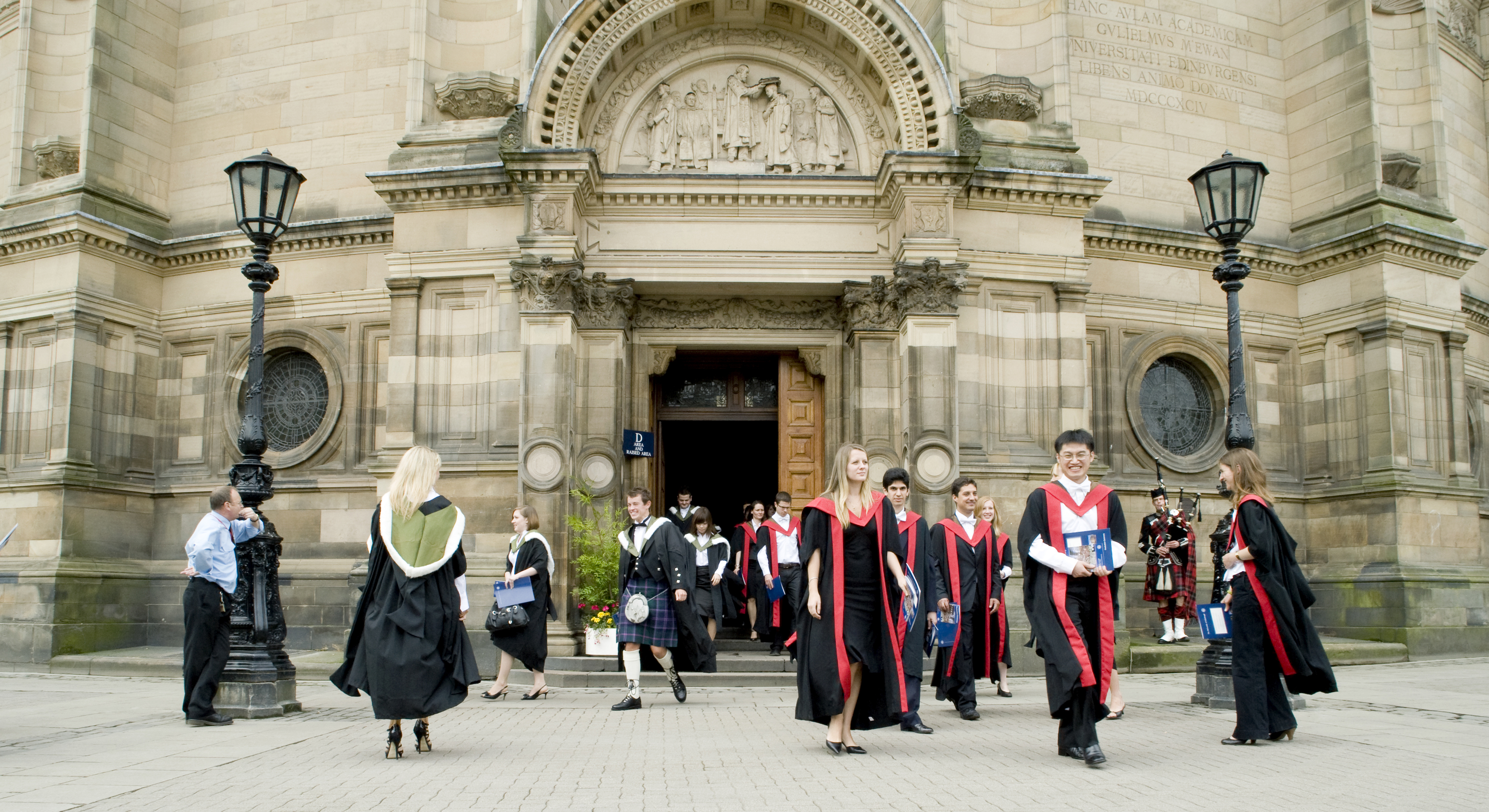
Students leaving after graduation (2008)

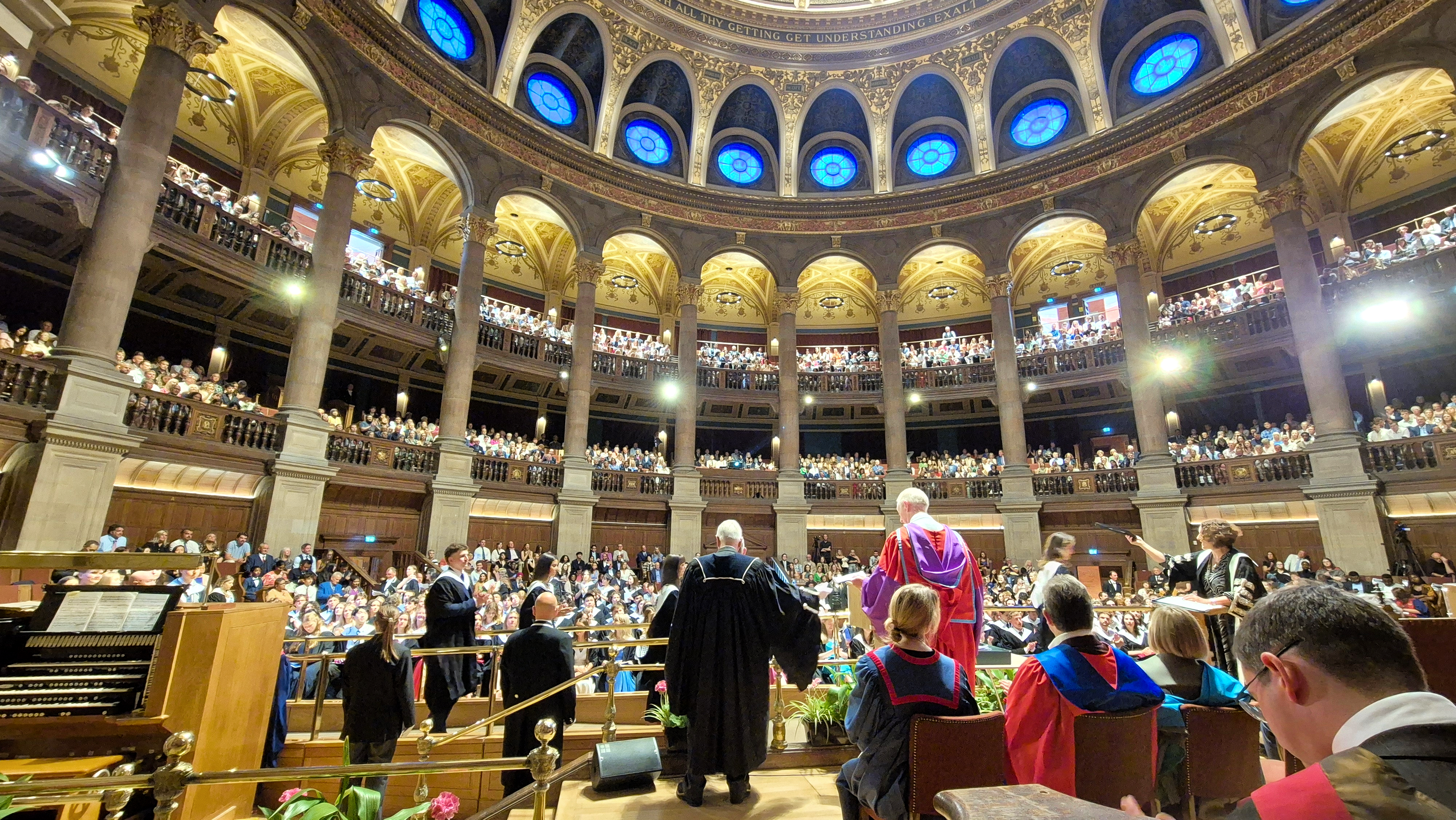
Podium view during graduation ceremony (2025)
