= Peter Gallwey =

Peter Gallwey (13 November 1820, Killarney – 23 September 1906, London) was a Jesuit priest and writer, who worked primarily in London.

== Life ==
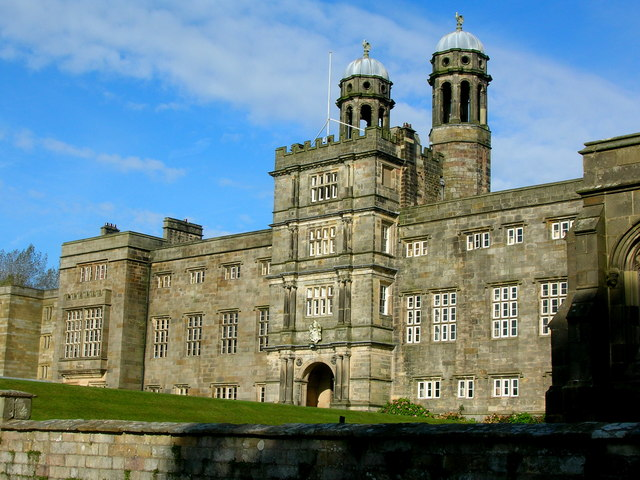
Stonyhurst College

He was educated at Stonyhurst College, and joined the Society of Jesus at Hodder, 7 September 1836. He was ordained priest in 1852, and professed of four vows in 1854. As prefect of studies at Stonyhurst, 1855–1857, he made improvements in the method of study.

In 1857 he was sent to the Jesuit church in Farm Street, London, where—except for an interval of eight years during which he held the provincialate and other offices—he spent the rest of his life. A man of deep spirituality, he was much venerated as a preacher, spiritual director and giver of retreats. In October 1869, he left Farm Street to become novice master at Manresa House in Roehampton, where Gerard Manley Hopkins was one of his novices. Gallwey served as Provincial of the English Province from 1873 to 1876, after which he became Rector at St Beuno's College in Wales.

In 1878, Gallwey returned to Farm Street as pastor and brought Hopkins with him, having been impressed by the originality of one of Hopkins' sermons. One of Gallwey's notable converts was Janet Erskine Stuart, daughter of an Anglican clergyman, and granddaughter of the Earl Castle Stewart. She joined the Society of the Sacred Heart, eventually becoming Superior General.

== Works ==
His writings include:

- The Lady Chapel and Dr. Pusey's Peacemaker (1865)
- Lectures on Ritualism (1879, two volumes)
- Salvage from the Wreck: A Few Memories of Friends Departed Preserved in Funeral Discourses (1890), sermons preached at the funerals of some notable Catholics.
- The Watches of the Passion (1894), a series of meditations on the Passion, embodying the substance of his retreats.

== Legacy ==
In 1905, St Joseph's Hospice for the Dying in Hackney by the Religious Sisters of Charity at Gallwey's suggestion. He was the Rector of the Farm Street Church at the time, and was instrumental in obtaining the necessary donations for establishing the hospice. St Joseph's continues to provide care for anyone with serious and life-threatening conditions.
