= Brooksby House Hospital =

- NHS Ayrshire and Arran
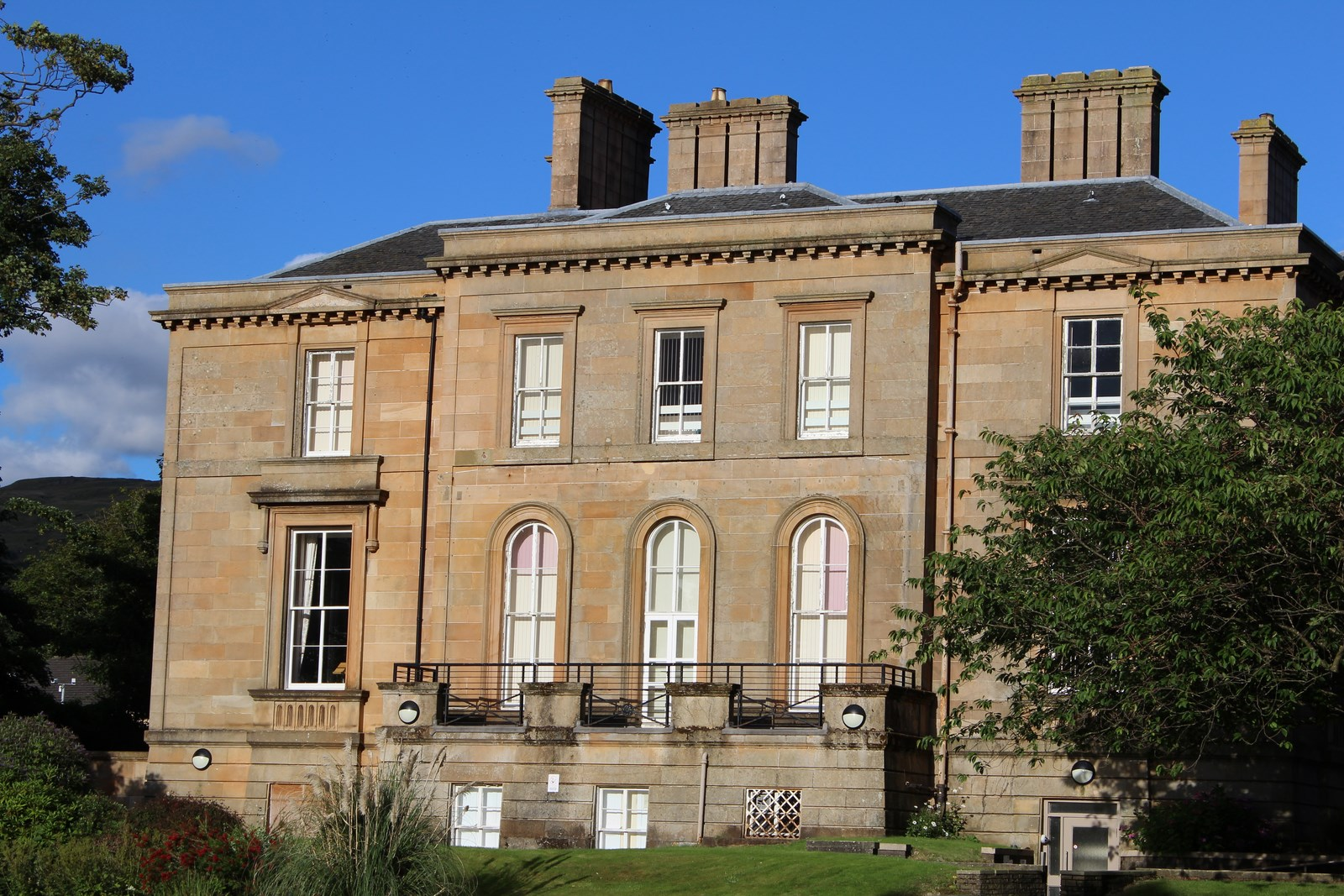
- Brooksby House

- Shown in North Ayrshire

Geography
- Location: Largs, North Ayrshire, Scotland
- Coordinates: 55.7978°N 4.8677°W

Organisation
- Care system: NHS Scotland
- Type: Community hospital

Links
- Lists: Hospitals in Scotland

Brooksby House Hospital is a community hospital in the North Ayrshire region in Scotland. It is managed by NHS Ayrshire and Arran. It is a Category A listed building.

== History ==
The house was designed by David Hamilton and built as a yachting residence for Matthew Preston, a Glasgow businessman. It was acquired as a convalescent home for the Glasgow Victoria Infirmary in 1896 and officially opened by Lady Watson (Note: Wife of Sir Renny Watson, Chairman of the Board of the Glasgow Victoria Infirmary) in June 1897.

The Brooksby Resource Centre, which offers both health services and local council services, was opened at Brooksby House by Nicola Sturgeon, Deputy First Minister, in 2009.
