= NHS Ayrshire and Arran =

Health system in South Ayrshire, Scotland

- Type: NHS board
- Established: 1 April 2004
- Headquarters: Dalmellington Road; Ayr; KA6 6AB
- Region served: East Ayrshire; North Ayrshire; South Ayrshire
- Hospitals: Ailsa Hospital; Arran War Memorial Hospital; Ayrshire Central Hospital; Biggart Hospital; Brooksby House Hospital; East Ayrshire Community Hospital; Girvan Community Hospital; Kirklandside Hospital; Lady Margaret Hospital; University Hospital Ayr; University Hospital Crosshouse
- Staff: 9,491 (2018/19)
- Website: www.nhsaaa.net

NHS Ayrshire and Arran is one of the fourteen regions of NHS Scotland. It was formed on 1 April 2004.

It has a responsibility to provide health and social care to almost 400,000 people with an operating budget of around £700 million (for 2013–2014), and planned budgets of £720 (for 2019-2020), £762.4 million (for 2020-2021) and £774.5 million (for 2021-2022).

== Services ==
The health board has almost 6,000 staff working in their hospitals, and almost 2,500 staff working in the community.

It is also responsible for the care provided by:

- 300 general practitioners and their teams at 90 sites
- 98 community pharmacies
- 160 dentists at more than 70 sites
- 60 ophthalmic practices

== Hospitals ==
- List of hospitals in Scotland (NHS Ayrshire and Arran section)

=== East Ayrshire area ===
- East Ayrshire Community Hospital, Cumnock
- University Hospital Crosshouse, Crosshouse, Kilmarnock

=== North Ayrshire area ===
- Arran War Memorial Hospital, Lamlash, Isle of Arran
- Ayrshire Central Hospital, Irvine
- Brooksby House Hospital, Largs
- Lady Margaret Hospital, Millport, Isle of Cumbrae
- Woodland View, Irvine

=== South Ayrshire area ===
- Ailsa Hospital, Ayr
- Biggart Hospital, Prestwick
- Girvan Community Hospital, Girvan
- University Hospital Ayr

=== Emergency Departments (ED) ===
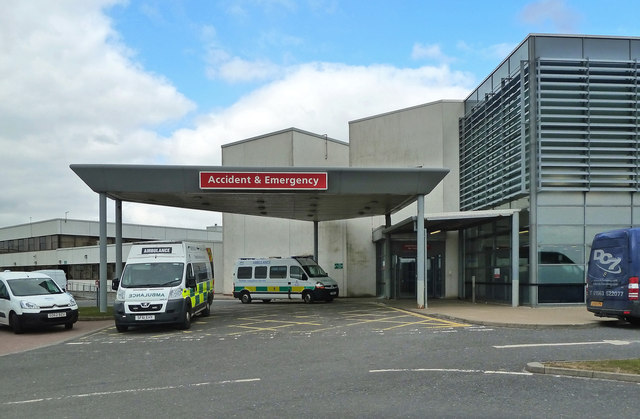
Emergency Department at University Hospital Crosshouse

Only three hospitals within the NHS Ayrshire and Arran have a designated emergency department (ED), previously known as Accident and Emergency (A&E). University Hospital Crosshouse has a large department which was opened in the early 2000s. The Emergency Department at University Hospital Ayr was marked for closure, with the emergency department proposed to move from Ayr to University Hospital Crosshouse. This plan was eventually abolished, and University Hospital Ayr continues to have an emergency department, as does the Arran War Memorial Hospital on the Isle of Arran. Under the Scottish Government’s Mental Health Strategy 2017-2027 a new National Secure Adolescent Inpatient Service has been approved and is expected to open in 2022. It will be named Foxgrove and will be located at Ayrshire Central Hospital Campus in Irvine.

== Performance ==
In May 2015 only 88% of patients attending the Boards A&E departments were seen within the four-hour target. This was the worst performance of all the Scottish health boards.

The Health and Social Care Partnership in Ayrshire and Arran established three community wards to manage high-risk patients with heart problems and diabetes in 2016. This reduced emergency hospital admissions by 40% in the first six months of operation.

Nicola McIvor, catering production & services manager, was awarded Caterer of the Year in April 2017 at the annual Hospital Caterers Association awards. The production and services department won the Staff, Health and Wellbeing award.
