= East Ayrshire Community Hospital =

- NHS Ayrshire and Arran
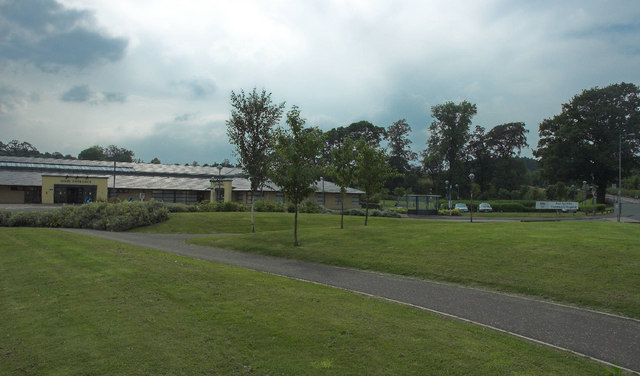
- East Ayrshire Community Hospital

- Shown in East Ayrshire

Geography
- Location: Ayr Road, Cumnock, Scotland
- Coordinates: 55.45087°N 4.27444°W

Organisation
- Care system: NHS Scotland
- Type: Community Hospital

Services
- Beds: 53

Links
- Website: www.nhsaaa.net/hospitals/east-ayrshire-community-hospital/
- Lists: Hospitals in Scotland
- Other links: List of hospitals in Scotland

East Ayrshire Community Hospital is a community hospital located in Ayr Road, Cumnock, Scotland. It is managed by NHS Ayrshire and Arran.

== History ==
The hospital was commissioned to replace Ballochmyle Hospital. It was procured under a Private Finance Initiative contract in 1999. It was designed by MacLachlan Monaghan, built by BAM Construction at a cost of £9 million and completed in August 2000.

== Services ==
Facilities include 24 in-patient beds, an outpatient suite, 13 beds for elderly people and 16 beds for elderly people with mental health issues. There is also a community dental practice.
