= George Mackie Watson =

Scottish architect (1860–1948)

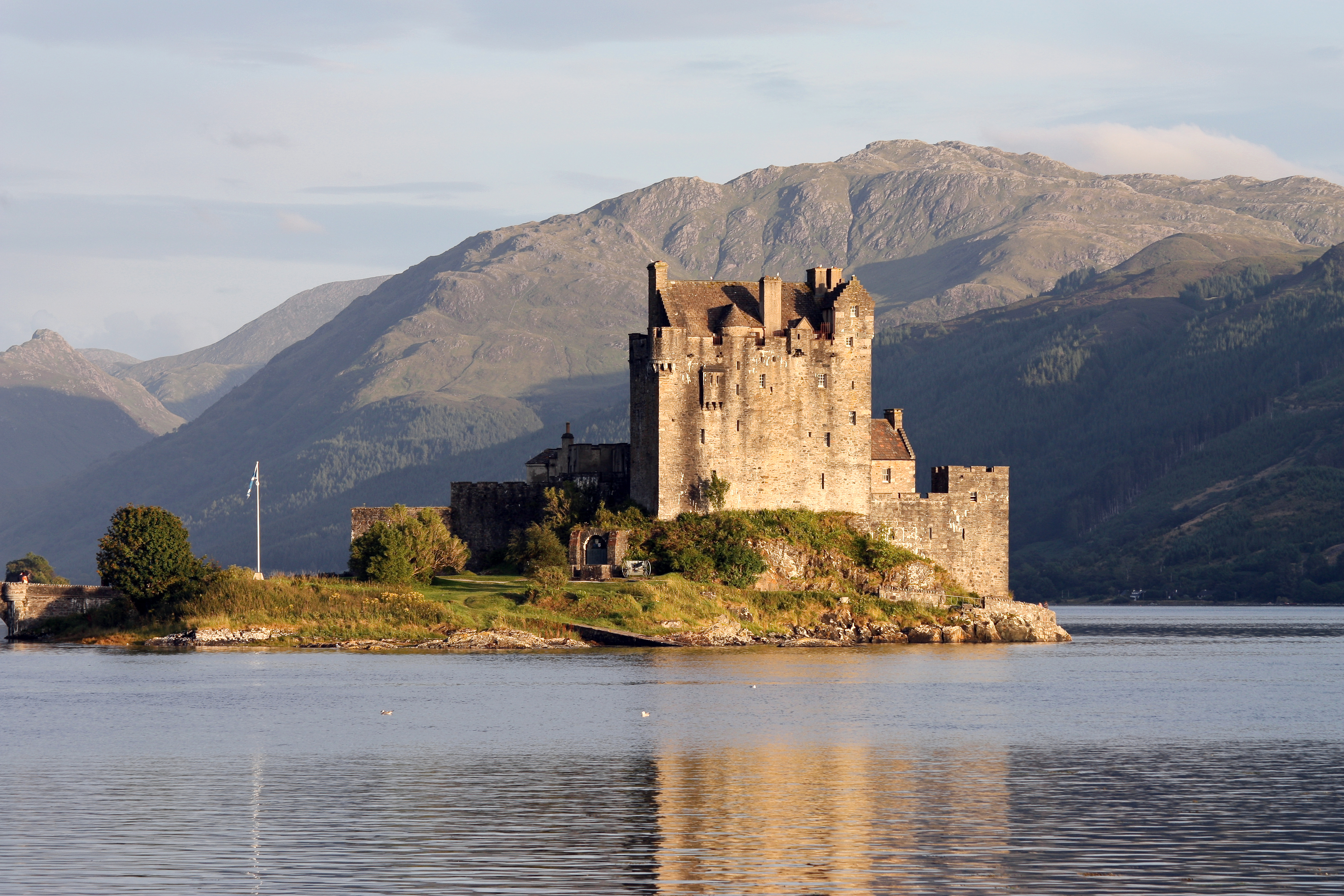
Eilean Donan, seen from the west

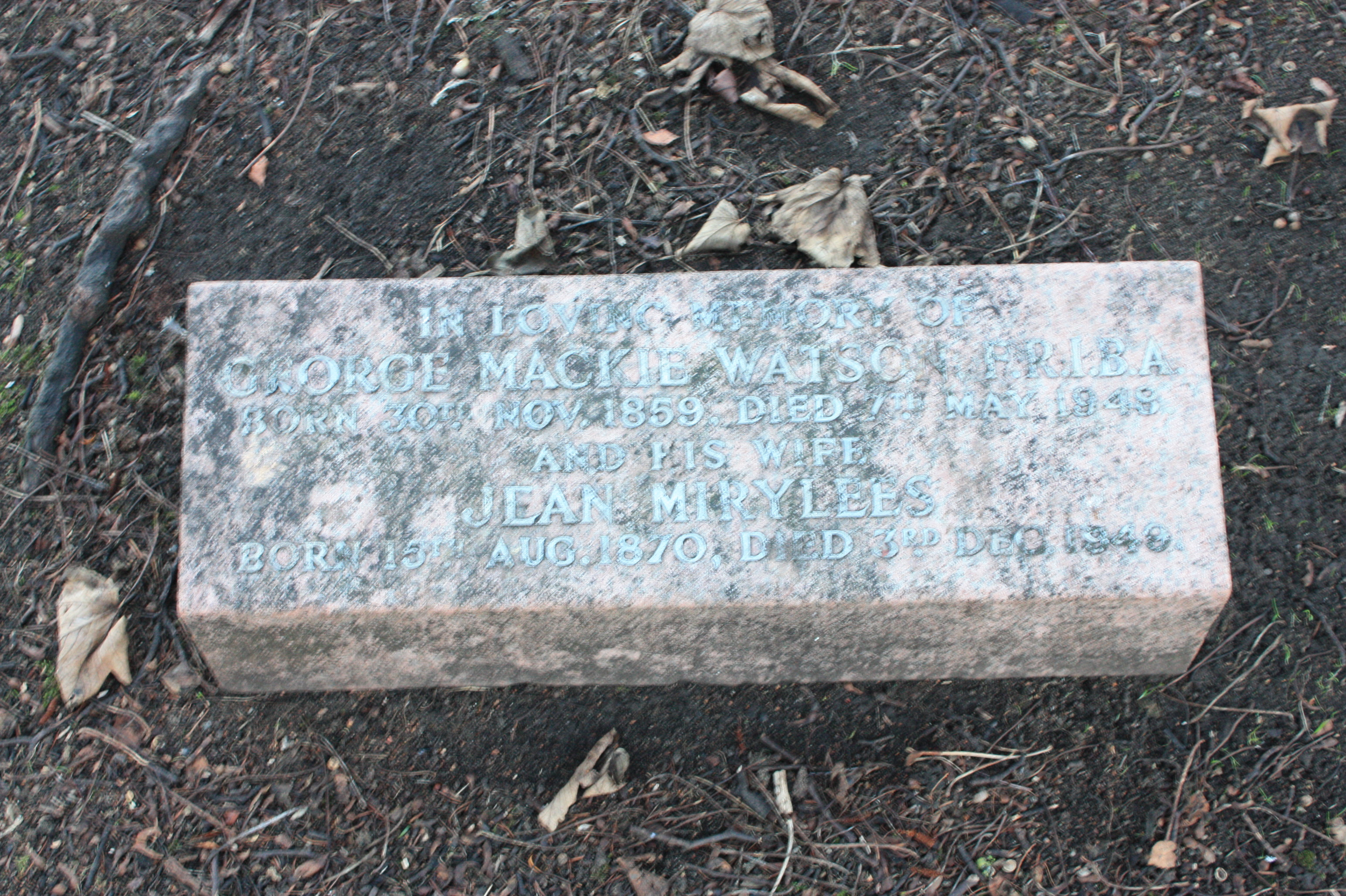
The grave of George Mackie Watson, Grange Cemetery Edinburgh

George Mackie Watson RIBA (1860–1948) was a Scottish architect in the late 19th and early 20th centuries. He trained in the offices of Robert Rowand Anderson, and was responsible for the design and reconstruction of several churches. From 1912 to 1932 he was involved in the total rebuilding of Eilean Donan Castle on the west coast of Scotland, for John Macrae-Gilstrap.

== Life ==
He was born at 1 Teviot Row in Edinburgh's South Side, the fourth son of George Watson, cabinetmaker, and his wife, Agnes Shaw. He was educated at George Watson's College. In 1876 he was articled as an apprentice architect to Robert Rowand Anderson working on the McEwan Hall and National Portrait Gallery projects in Edinburgh. He was promoted to Chief Assistant in 1884.

In 1892 he began teaching architecture at Anderson's Edinburgh School of Applied Art but continued to do some work for Rowand Anderson. In 1899 he set up independently as an architect at 4 Hope Street, just off Charlotte Square in Edinburgh. From 1911 his office was at 50 Queen Street.

He died on 7 May 1948. He is buried in Grange Cemetery in southern Edinburgh. The grave lies on the south side of the main north path and is marked by a simple small marker stone. He was married to Jean Steedman Mirylees (d.1949). They lived first at 8 Scotland Street in the Second New Town then they moved to 17 East Claremont Street.

== Principal works ==
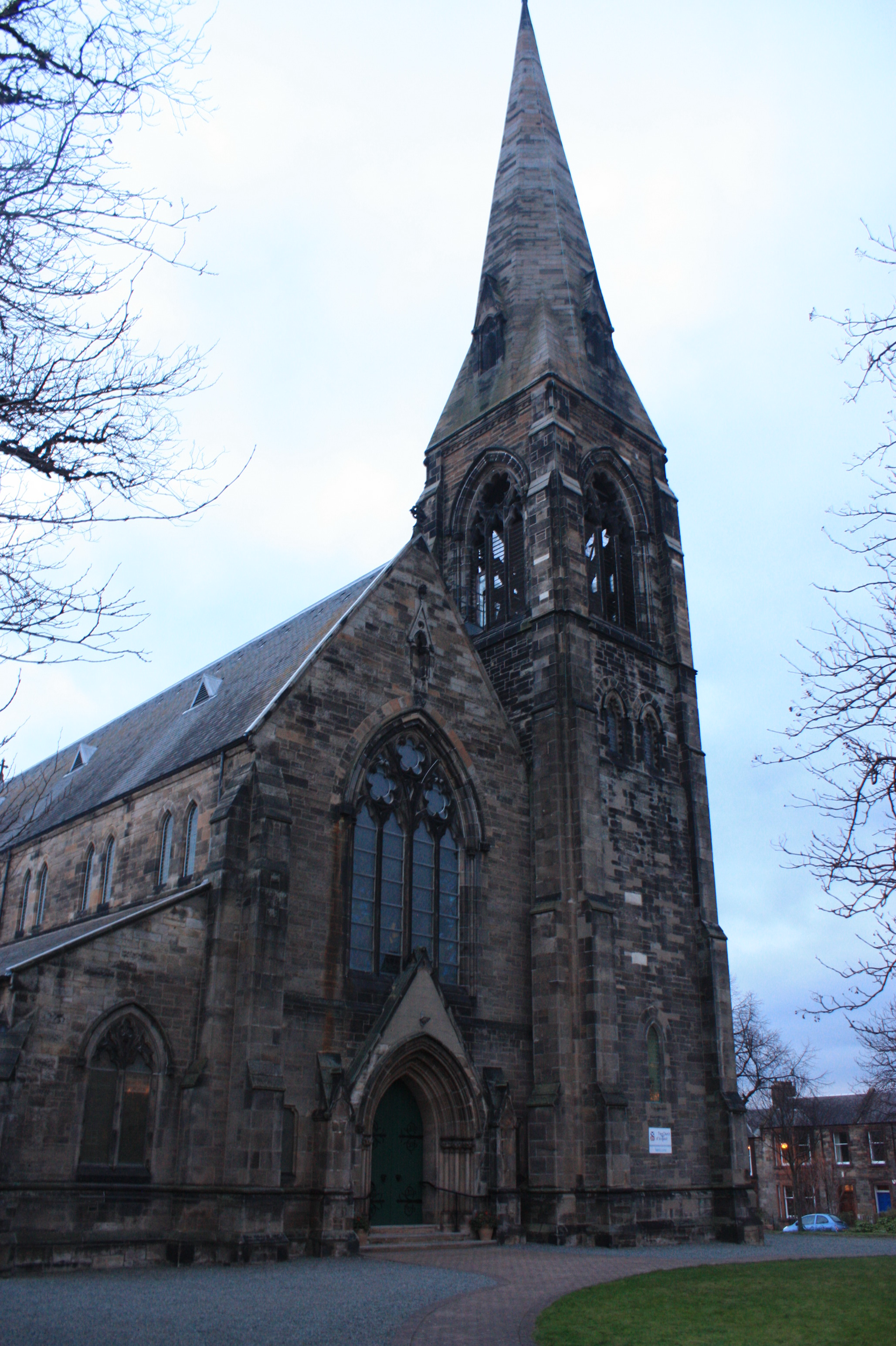
St James Church, Portobello

Selected projects to which Watson contributed as assistant to Rowand Anderson:

- Holy Trinity Episcopal Church, Stirling (1876)
- McEwan Hall, Edinburgh (1876–1897)
- Glasgow Central Station Hotel (1877)
- Mount Stuart House, Bute (1879)
- Ballochmyle House, Mauchline (1885)
- Restoration of Dunblane Cathedral (1889)
- Kings College Chapel, Aberdeen University (1890)
- Restoration of Paisley Abbey (1898)

Selected works as an independent practitioner:

- Restoration of Strachur church, Argyll (1899)
- Feuing plan for the Hailes Estate on Lanark Road, Edinburgh (1900)
- St Serfs Church, Goldenacre, Edinburgh (1901)
- Unsuccessful competition entry for the Peace Palace in The Hague (1907)
- Restoration of Kirkwall Cathedral, Orkney (1908)
- St James Church, Portobello, Edinburgh (1910)
- Remodelling of New Castle Lachlan, Argyll (1910)
- Remodelling of Falkirk Old Parish Church (1910)
- Restoration and consolidation at Eilean Donan Castle (1912)
- Knockdown House, Toward, Argyll (1919)
