= Lady Margaret Hospital =

- NHS Ayrshire and Arran
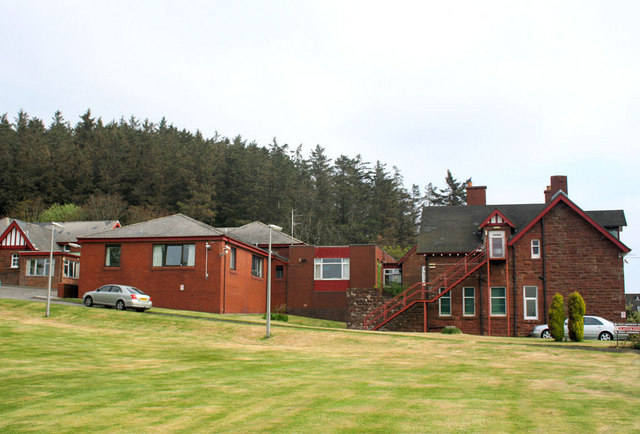
- Lady Margaret Hospital in 2007 by John McLeish

- Shown on Great Cumbrae

Geography
- Location: Millport, Great Cumbrae, North Ayrshire, Scotland
- Coordinates: 55.7612°N 4.9238°W

Organisation
- Care system: NHS Scotland

Services
- Beds: 10

History
- Founded: 1900

Links
- Website: www.nhsaaa.net/services/hospitals/lady-margaret-hospital/
- Lists: Hospitals in Scotland

Lady Margaret Hospital is a small 10-bedded hospital at Millport on Great Cumbrae in North Ayrshire, Scotland. It is managed by NHS Ayrshire and Arran.

== History ==
The foundation stone for the new "Millport Infectious Diseases Hospital" was laid by Sir Charles Dalrymple, a former Grand Master Mason of the Grand Lodge of Scotland, on 13 January 1900. The building, designed by architects Fryer & Penman of Largs, consisted of red sandstone forming three blocks - one for male patients, another for female patients, and the third for administrative staff. It was officially opened by Lady Margaret Crichton-Stuart, daughter of John Crichton-Stuart, 3rd Marquess of Bute, on 25 September 1900.

The facility was converted to a general hospital in 1929 and joined the National Health Service as the Lady Margaret Hospital (named in recognition of the person who opened it) in 1948.

== Services ==
The hospital has facilities for treating minor injuries.
