= Digby Stuart College =

College at the University of Roehampton

- University of Roehampton
- Location: Roehampton, London, England
- Coordinates: 51.4566°N 0.2431°W
- Motto: The Utmost for the Highest
- Established: 1874
- Named for: Mother Mabel Digby and Mother Janet Stuart
- Residents: 450
- Website: https://www.roehampton.ac.uk/colleges/digby-stuart-college/

Digby Stuart College is one of the four constituent colleges of the University of Roehampton.

== Foundation ==
The college was established in 1874 as Wandsworth College, a women's teacher training college, by the Catholic Society of the Sacred Heart, an order of French religious women who settled at Roehampton in 1850. At the time there were two other Catholic training colleges in Britain, St Mary's in London for men, founded 1850, and Our Lady's in Liverpool for women, founded 1856. In 1905 the college moved to St Charles Square, North Kensington and took the name St Charles College. The college moved to Roehampton and was renamed in honour of Mabel Digby and Janet Erskine Stuart in 1946. The college became coeducational in 1971.

In 1975, the college became part of the Roehampton Institute of Higher Education, which became Roehampton University in 2004. Upon discovering Rose Philippine Duchesne and the Society of the Sacred Heart's links to slavery, Digby Stuart College renamed the Duchesne Building after Nelson Mandela in 2018.

Currently, approximately 2,000 of Roehampton's 8,000 students, are assigned to Digby Stuart College with about 450 living on the campus.

The Old Lodge and the Chapel of the Sacred Heart, built by William Wardell in 1853, are listed buildings.

== Roehampton Institute of Calligraphy ==
In 1979 Ann Camp ARCA who had been teaching calligraphy to the BEd students began a course of calligraphy and bookbinding at Digby Stuart College, one of only two such course in the Western world. Twelve students per year were taken on, most of whom already possessed an undergraduate degree although a number of students held a PhD. A Certificate in Calligraphy and Bookbinding was offered, followed by a Diploma in Calligraphy, followed in turn by an Advanced Diploma in Calligraphy. Ann Camp retired in 1989 and although the course continued for some years afterwards, Digby Stuart College withdrew its support and the course transferred to Kensington Palace under the aegis of the Prince of Wales Trust.

== See also ==
- Network of Sacred Heart Schools

== Sources ==
- Digby Stuart History
