= Girvan Community Hospital =

- NHS Ayrshire and Arran
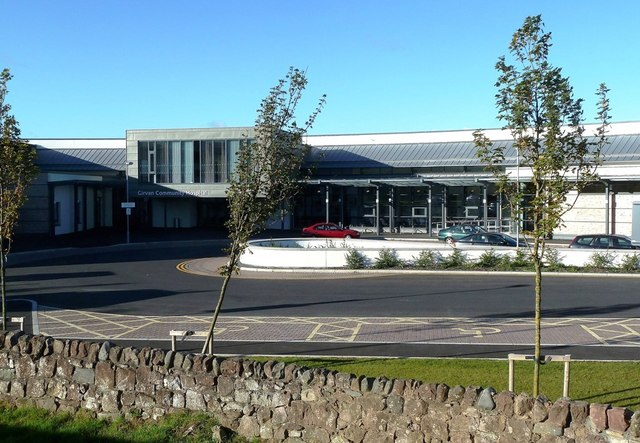
- Girvan Community Hospital

- Shown in South Ayrshire

Geography
- Location: Girvan, South Ayrshire, Scotland
- Coordinates: 55.2484°N 4.8471°W

Organisation
- Care system: NHS Scotland
- Type: General

History
- Founded: 2010

Links
- Lists: Hospitals in Scotland

Girvan Community Hospital is a health facility in Girvan, South Ayrshire, Scotland. It is managed by NHS Ayrshire and Arran.

== History ==
The facility was commissioned to replace the aging Davidson Hospital. The building, which was designed by Austin-Smith:Lord and built by Barr Construction at a cost £15.2 million, was completed in March 2010.

== Services ==
The hospital is a 26-bed inpatient beds (GP-led) with various services including a Minor injuries unit, two GP practices, outpatient services, a Scottish Ambulance Service base and a Boots pharmacy.
