= Janet Erskine Stuart =

English religious sister (1857 - 1914)

Servant of God Mary Janet Erskine Stuart RSCJ
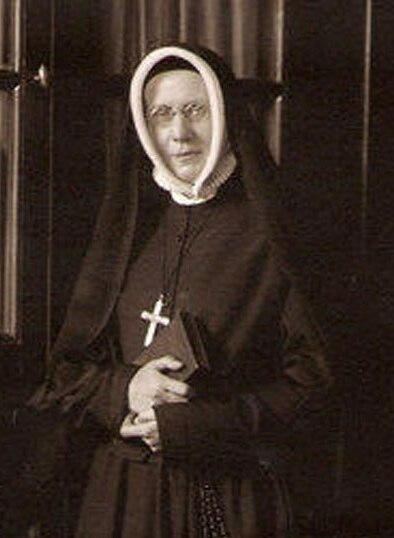
- Born: 11 November 1857; Cottesmore, Rutland, England
- Died: 21 October 1914 (aged 56); Roehampton, London, England

Janet Erskine Stuart, RSCJ (11 November 1857, Cottesmore, Rutland – 21 October 1914, Roehampton), also known as Mother Janet Stuart, was an English religious sister in the Roman Catholic Church. She founded a number of schools.

Stuart left the Church of England and converted to the Catholic Church in 1879. She joined the Society of the Sacred Heart at Roehampton three years later and, in 1911, became Superior General of the Society.

== Biography ==
=== Early life ===
Stuart was born on 11 November 1857 in Cottesmore, Rutland, where her father, Andrew Godfrey Stuart, a son of Earl Castle Stewart, was the rector. Her mother, his second wife, was Mary Penelope Noel, a relative of the Earl of Gainsborough.

Janet was the youngest of thirteen children in the family. She lost her mother at the age of 3, and was raised by her elder sister. By the age of 6 Janet had become well acquainted with the Bible and would often look at theological questions with her brother. She lived in rural Rutland and would often explore the land around her, developing a love of flora and fauna, as well as an ability to find comfort and relief in nature. This connection with nature helped Stuart find peace when her elder sister died. Stuart continued to develop and search for her relationship with God into her early adulthood, when she met the Catholic priest Peter Gallwey, who became her spiritual mentor and friend. Stuart felt that the Catholic Church would give her the most freedom in her spirituality and converted in 1879. Due to the strong religious divide in England at the time, and being the daughter of an Anglican rector, this conversion cost Stuart her relationship with her family as she left the Church of England.

=== Vocation and religious life ===
On 6 March 1879, at the age of 21, Stuart converted to the Roman Catholic Church. In 1882, she entered the Society of the Sacred Heart at Roehampton, where she would spend the next 30 years of her religious life. Stuart was named Mistress of novices on 12 February 1889, which began her three decades of serving as secretary and associate of the mother superior. In 1894, she became superior of the community in Roehampton, then superior of vicar of England. In this role, Stuart studied social injustice in her community, taught Sunday school, and advocated on behalf of poor tenant farmers. On 27 August 1911, she was elected as superior general of the Society of the Sacred Heart. In this role, Stuart made it her mission to become personally acquainted with all the religious and visit every community affiliated with the Society in the world. Stuart proceeded to visit almost every RSCJ community around the world and travelled extensively throughout the United States and Latin America. She also visited convents from Europe to Egypt, Australia, Japan, Canada, and the United States. Stuart directed the Society’s administration from their main office in Ixelles, Brussels until 1914, when she had to return to Roehampton due to the German occupation of Brussels that began in August 1914. Janet Erskine Stuart died on 21 October 1914. Many Religious of the Sacred Heart, other congregations, and individuals have been inspired by her conferences, essays, and poetry.

=== Writings ===
Her writings included The Education of Catholic Girls (1912), The Society of the Sacred Heart (1914), and Highways and By-ways in the Spiritual Life. Stuart contributed also to the Catholic Encyclopedia.

She visited the Catholic girls' boarding school in Wellington, NZ, in 1914 and planted a tree. In the 1960s, the school was named Erskine College, after her.

A source for the life of Stuart is the Life and Letters of Janet Erskine Stuart (1922) by Maud Monahan.

== Beatification process ==
A cause for Stuart's beatification was opened, and she was granted the title of a Servant of God. Theologians approved her spiritual writings in the 1950s.

== Legacy ==
- Digby Stuart College, a constituent college of the University of Roehampton, England, is named after her.
- Doane Stuart School. Rensselaer, New York, US
- Erskine College, Wellington, New Zealand, is named after her
- Stuart Country Day School, Princeton, New Jersey, US
- Stuart Hall for Boys, a K-8 school and Stuart Hall High School, a high school for boys, both in San Francisco, California, US
- Stuart Hall School for Boys, New Orleans, US
- Stuartholme School, a Catholic day and boarding school for girls aged 12–17 in Brisbane, Queensland, Australia
