= Mabel Digby (Catholic nun) =

English Roman Catholic nun

Mabel Digby (1835–1911) was an English convert to Roman Catholicism from the Anglican faith. As a sister of the Society of the Sacred Heart of Jesus, she served as the fifth superior general from 1895 until her death. Digby Stuart College at the University of Roehampton is named for her, and lists her as a founder.

== Early life and education ==
She was born Marie Joséphine Mabel Digby on April 7, 1835 in Staines, Middlesex, England to Elizabeth Ann Ella Morse and Simon Digby, and she was one of six children. She was baptized in the Anglican church on May 5, 1835 at the ancient church of St. Matthew in nearby Ashford, Surrey.

== Religious life ==
Digby entered the Society of the Sacred Heart in the mid-19th century and took her final vows in 1863. Over the next several decades, she held leadership roles within the congregation’s educational institutions in England and Ireland. In 1895, she was elected superior general of the Society, becoming the first Englishwoman to lead the international order. Her term was marked by efforts to expand the Society’s global mission and by renewed attention to the spiritual formation of its members. When serving as the Superior the English Vicariate of the Society of the Sacred Heart, Roehampton, she assured that Catholic girls in a predominantly Anglican country would receive a fine education.

== Death ==
She died in Ixelles, Belgium, on November 26, 1911, while still serving as superior general. She was in Belgium because Catholics had been expelled from France under an anti-clerical regime. The Waldreck-Rousseau law that had legalized trade unions also made religious houses like those of the RSCJ illegal. The government forced her to relocate 2,500 sisters, and the stress may have contributed to her frail health and collapse.

== Legacy ==
Digby is remembered within the Society for her combination of administrative ability and contemplative spirituality. She guided the order through a period of growth, navigating both internal reforms and changing relations with the broader Church hierarchy.
