= Ailsa Hospital =

- NHS Ayrshire and Arran
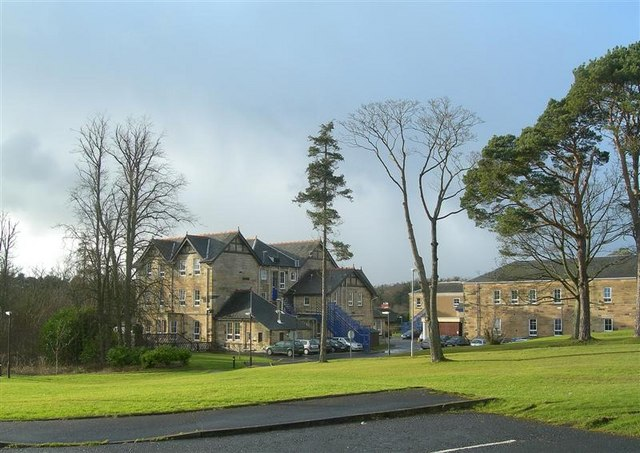
- Ailsa Hospital

- Shown in South Ayrshire

Geography
- Location: Ayr, South Ayrshire, Scotland
- Coordinates: 55.4342°N 4.5928°W

Organisation
- Care system: NHS Scotland
- Type: Specialist

Services
- Beds: 52
- Speciality: Psychiatry

History
- Founded: 1869

Links
- Website: www.nhsaaa.net/hospitals/ailsa-hospital/
- Lists: Hospitals in Scotland

Ailsa Hospital is a mental health facility located in the southeastern outskirts of Ayr, South Ayrshire, Scotland. It is managed by NHS Ayrshire and Arran.

== History ==
In 1864, the Dundee-based architectural practice Edward and Robertson won the commission to build the hospital. Construction began in 1868 and the hospital opened as the Ayrshire District Asylum on 28 July 1869. The total cost of building the 230 bed hospital was £30,000. Two ward wings were added in 1879, the recreation hall was extended in 1886 and the wings were extended again in 1894. Two villas were completed in 1899 and a separate hospital block, designed by John Bennie Wilson, was added in 1906.

It joined the National Health Service as Glengall Hospital in 1948 and became Ailsa Hospital in 1958. A neurosis unit was established at Loudon House in 1968.

== Services ==
Ailsa Hospital offers inpatient mental health services as well as some outpatient and community services. In 2016 many acute mental health wards moved from Ailsa Hospital to Woodland View, a building in the grounds of Ayrshire Central Hospital.

It has a 12 bedded rehabilitation ward (Lochranza) and five psychiatric wards for older adults - Croy (14 beds), Dunure (15 beds), Iona/Lewis (15 beds), Jura (15 beds) and Clonbeith (15 beds). These wards have single rooms. The hospital is also the base for older adults liaison psychiatry.
