= Crosshouse =

Coordinates: 55°36′44″N 04°33′10″W

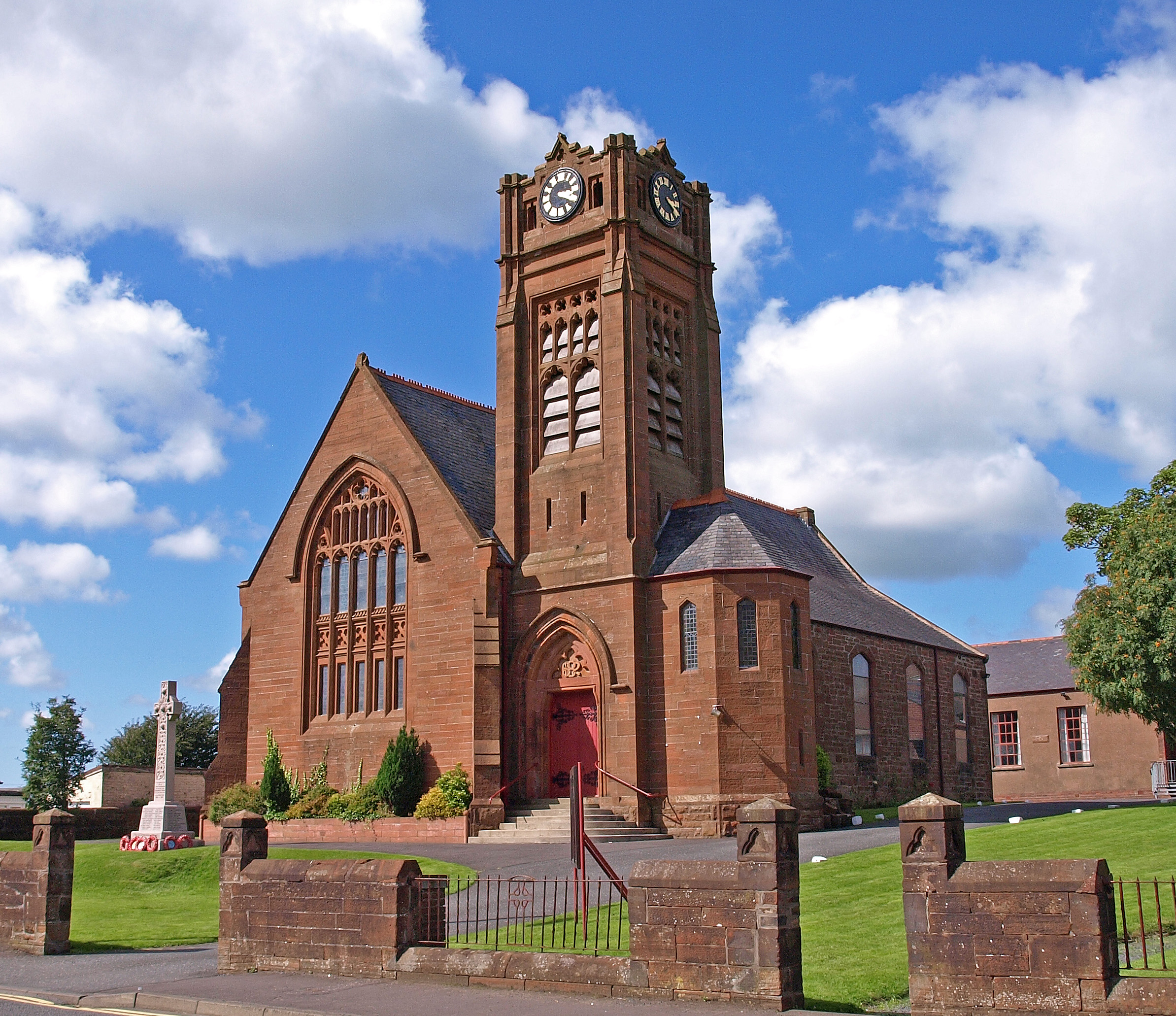
- Crosshouse Parish Church

- Location within East Ayrshire
- Population: 2,690 (2020)
- Council area: East Ayrshire
- Country: Scotland
- Sovereign state: United Kingdom
- Police: Scotland
- Fire: Scottish
- Ambulance: Scottish

Crosshouse is a village in East Ayrshire about 3 kilometres (2 miles) west of Kilmarnock. It grew around the cross-roads of the main Kilmarnock to Irvine road, once classified as the A71 but now reduced in status to the B7081, with a secondary road (the B751) running from Kilmaurs south to Gatehead and beyond towards Prestwick. The Carmel Water, a tributary of the River Irvine, flows through the centre of the village. It had an estimated population of 2,690 in 2020.

Andrew Fisher, who was the fifth Prime Minister of Australia, was born in the village and a plaque commemorating him is located at the road junction to Knockentiber.

== Health ==
The village is the location of a major hospital, Crosshouse Hospital, which was built to replace the Kilmarnock Infirmary.

== Transport ==
Crosshouse is served by the Stagecoach Group, running through from Kilmarnock to Irvine and Ardrossan.

== Education ==
The village is home to a school, Crosshouse Primary, which caters for children aged 4-11 years. It was extended and renovated by East Ayrshire Council at a cost of more than £6.5M, and formally opened in 2022. Now known as Crosshouse Primary and Communication Centre, it is the authorities leading primary school facility for children on the autistic spectrum. It features dedicated classrooms for both mainstream and autistic students and promotes integration between both. The extension features a new gym/dining hall, kitchen, flexible multi-purpose areas, a library and associated offices and meeting spaces, and includes a full three storey, glazed lightwell through which an elevated access bridge passes. The village also contains a nursery school.

From 1873 until 1966 Crosshouse possessed a railway station situated at Knockentiber 1.4 km (7/8 mi) north of the village centre along the Kilmaurs road. It was the point at which the railway line from Kilmarnock divided, to Dalry to the north-west and Irvine to the west. The latter line has been converted into a walkway and cycleway.
