= Biggart Hospital =

- NHS Ayrshire and Arran
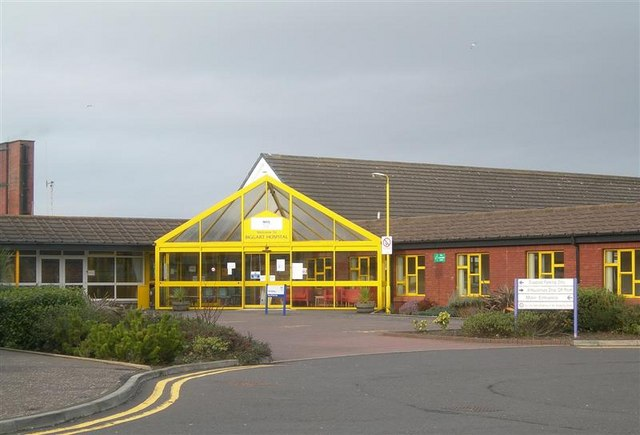
- The main entrance at Biggart Hospital

- Shown in South Ayrshire

Geography
- Location: Prestwick, South Ayrshire, Scotland
- Coordinates: 55.4924°N 4.6030°W

Organisation
- Care system: NHS Scotland
- Type: Specialist

Services
- Beds: 30
- Speciality: Care for the elderly

Links
- Website: www.nhsaaa.net/hospitals/biggart-hospital/
- Lists: Hospitals in Scotland

Biggart Hospital is a community hospital in Prestwick, Scotland. It is managed by NHS Ayrshire and Arran.

== History ==
The hospital was originally established by Robert Biggart and his wife as a holiday home for crippled children. It was designed by Robert Alexander Bryden and built between 1903 and 1905 and then extended in 1910. After joining the National Health Service in 1948, it became a home for the elderly in 1966.

== Services ==
There is a 30-bed day hospital for patients after discharge from acute care and a 15-bed stroke rehabilitation unit which provides support for stroke patients.
