= University Hospital Crosshouse =

- NHS Ayrshire and Arran
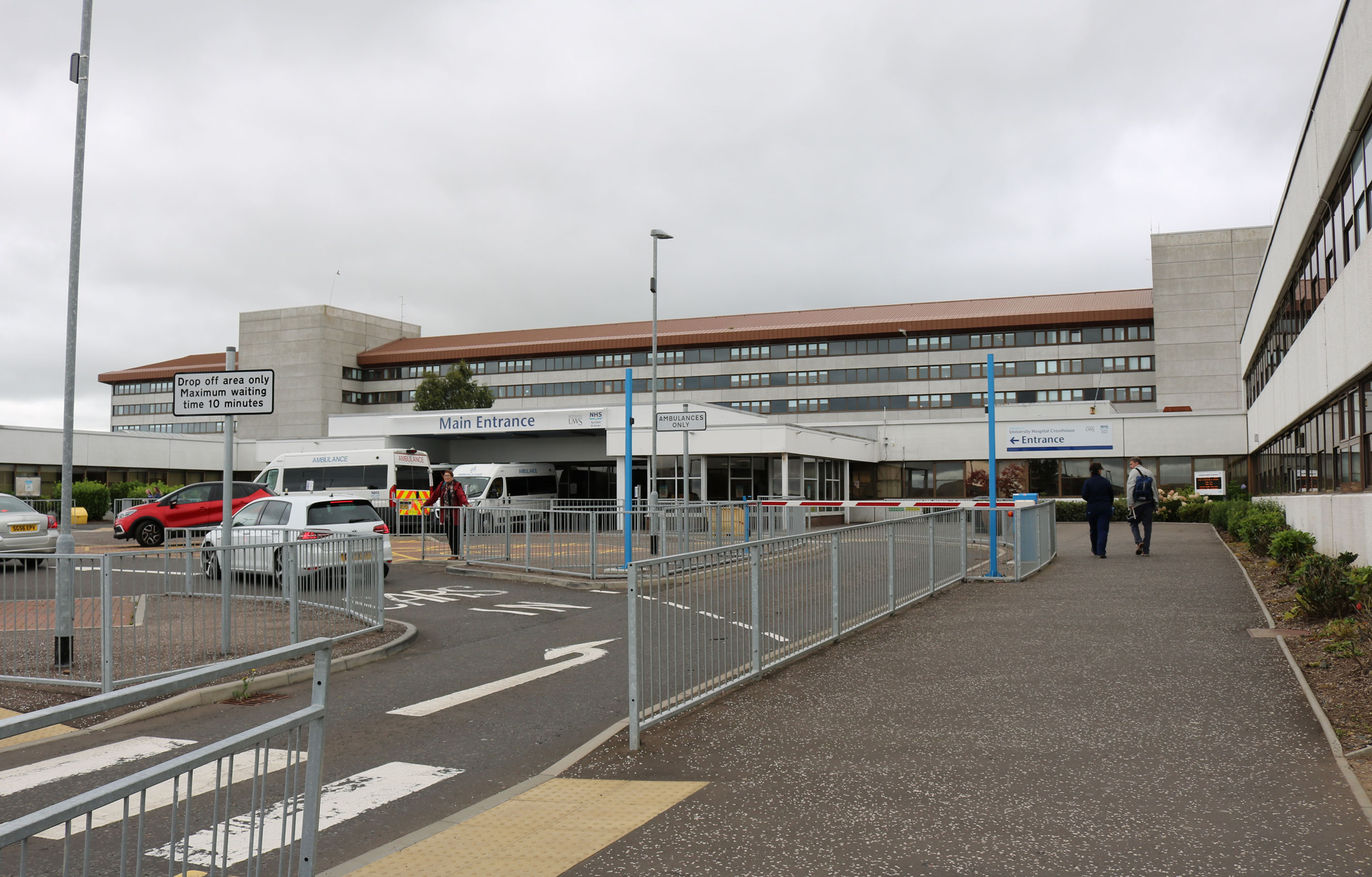
- Main entrance of University Hospital Crosshouse in 2019

- Shown in East Ayrshire

Geography
- Location: Kilmarnock Road, Crosshouse, East Ayrshire, Scotland
- Coordinates: 55°36′51″N 4°32′19″W

Organisation
- Care system: NHS Scotland
- Type: General
- Affiliated university: University of the West of Scotland

Services
- Emergency department: Yes
- Beds: 575

History
- Founded: 1978

Links
- Website: www.nhsaaa.net/hospitals/university-hospital-crosshouse/

University Hospital Crosshouse, known locally as Crosshouse, is a large district general hospital situated outside the village of Crosshouse, two miles outside Kilmarnock town centre in Scotland. It provides services to the North Ayrshire and East Ayrshire areas and is managed by NHS Ayrshire and Arran.

Built to replace the former Kilmarnock Infirmary, it opened to patients in 1984, and today the hospital houses the national Cochlear Implant Service and provides paediatric inpatient services.

== History ==
Work on the hospital, which was commissioned to replace the Kilmarnock Infirmary, began on the site in August 1972 with completion expected in May 1977. The contractor, Melville Dundas & Whitson, encountered difficulties with the water supply and ventilation systems and the facility was only officially opened by George Younger, Secretary of State for Scotland, as Crosshouse Hospital in June 1984.

A new maternity unit, which replaced a similar facility at Ayrshire Central Hospital in Irvine was opened in the grounds of the hospital in 2006.

In March 2012 it became University Hospital Crosshouse as a result of a partnership with the University of the West of Scotland.

On 4 February 2021 the hospital was placed into a police lockdown due to "serious incidents" at the hospital and around Kilmarnock with all ambulance and hospital traffic diverted to University Hospital Ayr. A member of staff was dead in the hospital car park, the root cause of the murder being a family rather than hospital matter.

== Services ==
Crosshouse Hospital is the site of the purpose-built Ayrshire Maternity Unit, which provides maternity services for the whole of NHS Ayrshire & Arran. The maternity unit has 51 inpatient beds, with a special care baby unit and neonatal intensive care unit on-site. The unit sees around 4,000 deliveries per annum.

=== Emergency Department (ED) ===
The Emergency Department, previously known as Accident and Emergency (A&E), unit at University Hospital Crosshouse serves both East Ayrshire and North Ayrshire, with main North Ayrshire hospital Ayrshire Central Hospital not having its own designated emergency department for Irvine and the surrounding population. The Emergency Department specialises in bone injuries, emergencies, eye injuries, child paediatrics, tele-medecine and carries out x-ray examinations for patients.

=== Ayrshire Maternity Unit ===
Ayrshire Maternity Unit was opened within the grounds of University Hospital Crosshouse in 2006, replacing the former maternity facilities at Ayrshire Central Hospital. The Ayrshire Maternity Unit is the main facility within Ayrshire and all three NHS Scotland Ayrshire health boards providing maternity services.

== Resuscitation DVD ==
In 2009, NHS Ayrshire and Arran produced a DVD for Bliss, the special care baby charity, to help train parents in infant resuscitation.
