= Ayrshire Central Hospital =

- NHS Ayrshire and Arran
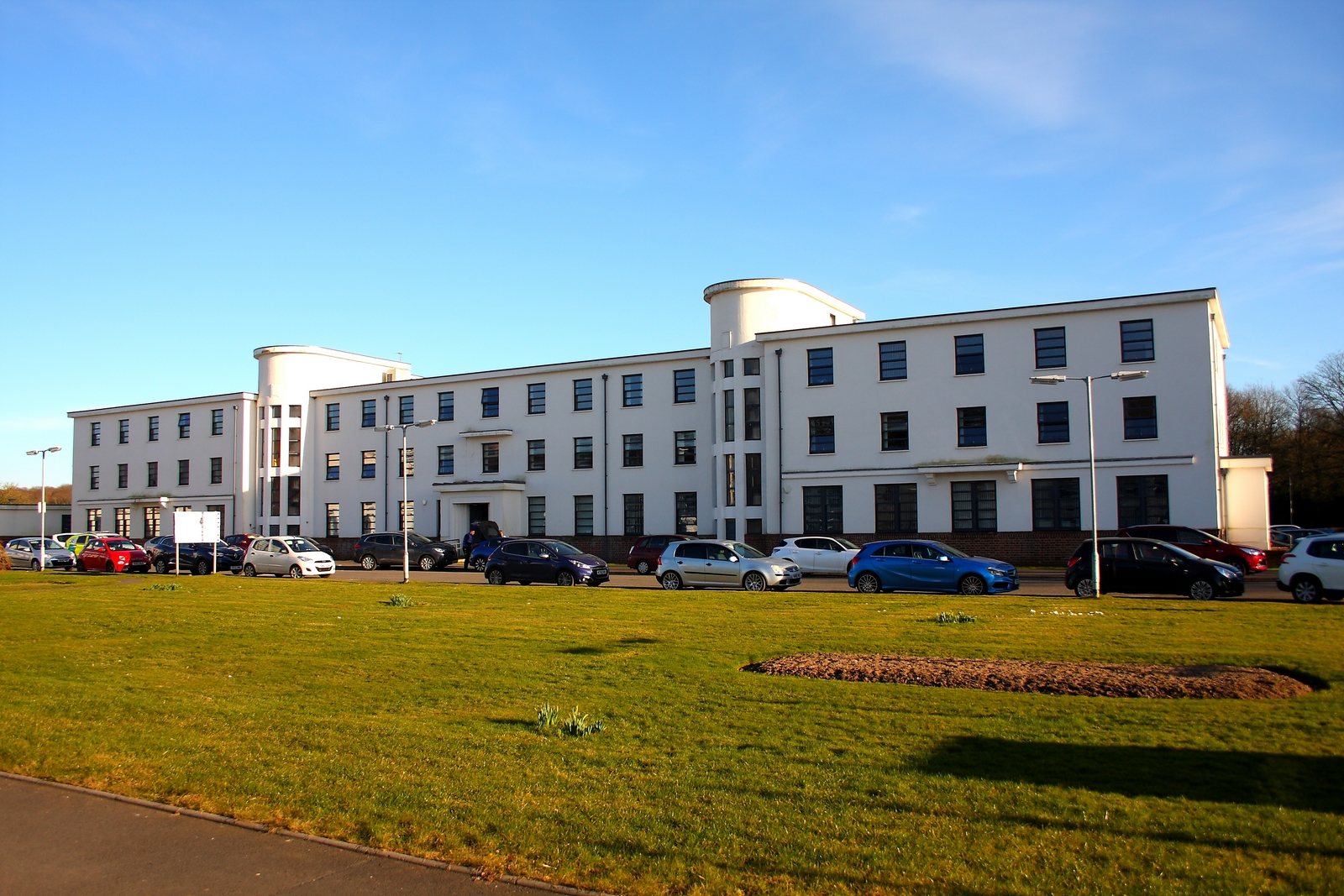
- Ayrshire Central Hospital

- Shown in North Ayrshire

Geography
- Location: Irvine, North Ayrshire, Scotland
- Coordinates: 55°38′03″N 4°40′23″W

Organisation
- Care system: NHS Scotland

Services
- Emergency department: No

History
- Founded: 1941

Links
- Website: www.nhsaaa.net/services/hospitals/ayrshire-central-hospital/
- Lists: Hospitals in Scotland

Ayrshire Central Hospital, also known as Irvine Central Hospital, is an NHS hospital in Irvine, North Ayrshire, Scotland. It is managed by NHS Ayrshire and Arran.

== History ==
=== Formation ===
The hospital is constructed on land which was formerly part of the southern portions of the Eglinton Castle Estate. The hospital, which was designed by William Reid and commissioned by the now defunct Ayr County Council, was built from 1936 and was opened in stages from 1941 and became fully operational by 1944. The hospital was constructed as a series of pavilions. It joined the National Health Service in 1948.

=== Flooding incident ===
On 1 December 2005, the maternity building was flooded by a burst water tank. The flooding threatened the special care baby unit and took fire crews from Dreghorn, Kilwinning and Kilmarnock 3 hours to control.

=== Maternity and neonatal units ===
Until the 1970s, uncomplicated births were usually at home or at the nearby Buckredden Maternity Home in Kilwinning while births at the hospital were often those that could involve complications. Subsequently most local births took place in the hospital. However Ayrshire paediatric services were centralised at Crosshouse in July 2006 while maternity services moved to the new Ayrshire Maternity Unit at Crosshouse Hospital in August 2006.

== Services ==
The hospital provides young disabled services and rehabilitation services, and has a number of assessment beds for the Elderly Mental Health Service.
