= Hospital Caterers Association =

The Hospital Caterers Association is an industry body in the United Kingdom for people and organisations involved in NHS Healthcare Catering Management established in 1948

It runs an annual award ceremony.

It set up an annual Nutrition and Hydration Week, every March. In 2016 95% of NHS Trusts and more than 2,000 care homes participated.

It supports efforts to reduce unhealthy food and drink supplies in the NHS.

Andy Jones, a former Chair of the Association, challenged NHS Chief Executives to eat patients food for a week in 2016, so that they would have a better understanding of the challenges.

Its Outstanding Service Award in 2020 went to Phil Shelley, who went on to be Chair of the NHS Review of Hospital Food.

== Presidents ==
- 1949 -1952 Sir Jack Drummond
- 1952 – 1966 Sir Alexander H. Maxwell
- 1966 – 1972 Sir Geoffrey Todd
- 1972 – 1977 R. A. Micklewright
- 1977 – 1987 Sir Douglas Haddow
- 1987 - 2004 Sir Brian Bailey OBE
- 2004 - 2005 Lord Hunt of Kings Heath
- 2006 - 2008 Caroline Waldegrave.
- 2009 - 2011 Rennie Fritchie, Baroness Fritchie
- 2012 - 2017 Fionnuala Cook
- 2017 - Lord Hunt of Kings Heath.
