= Ayr =

Coordinates: 55.458°N 4.629°W

Ayr: Scottish Gaelic: Inbhir Àir; Scots: Ayr
- Administrative centre and town
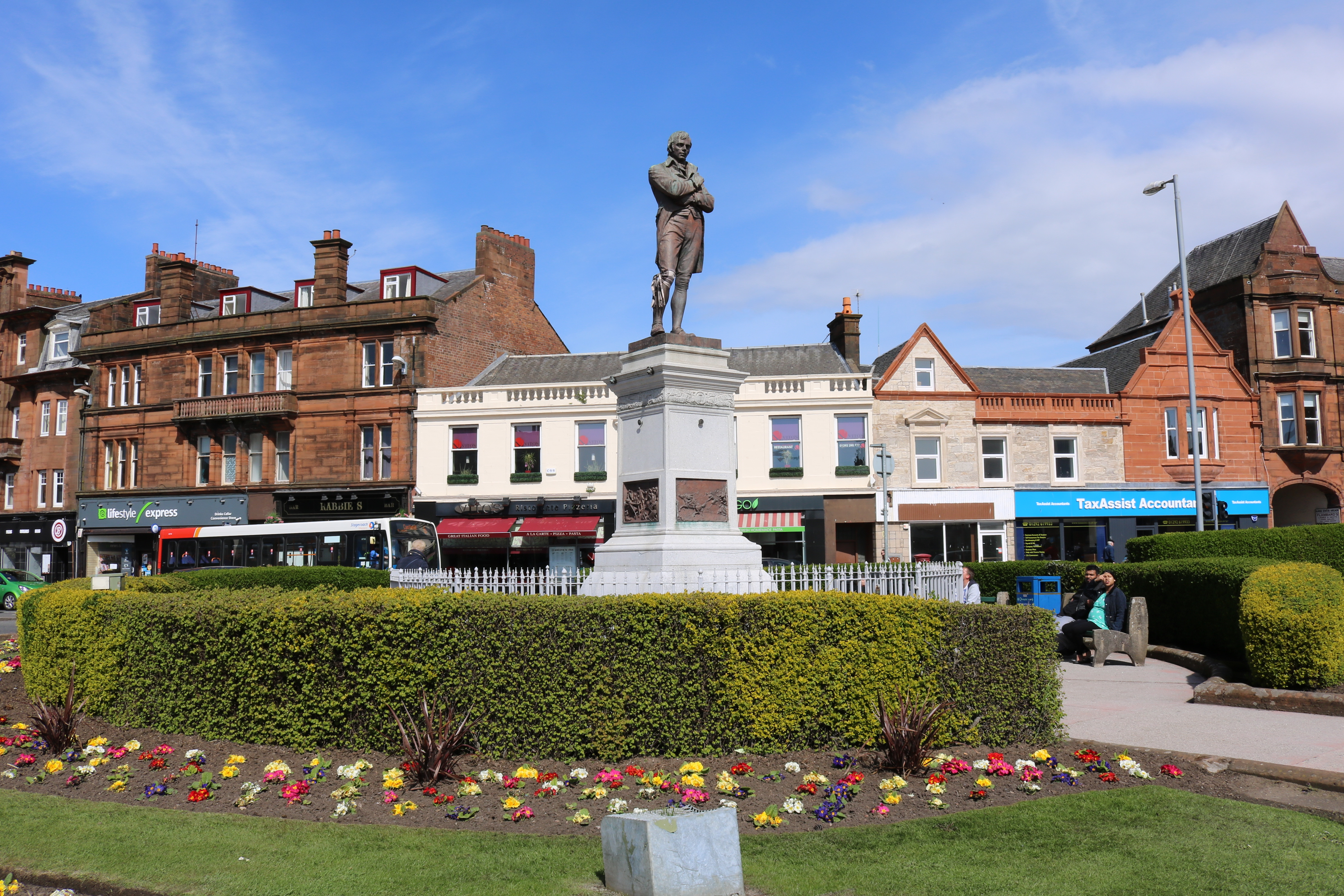
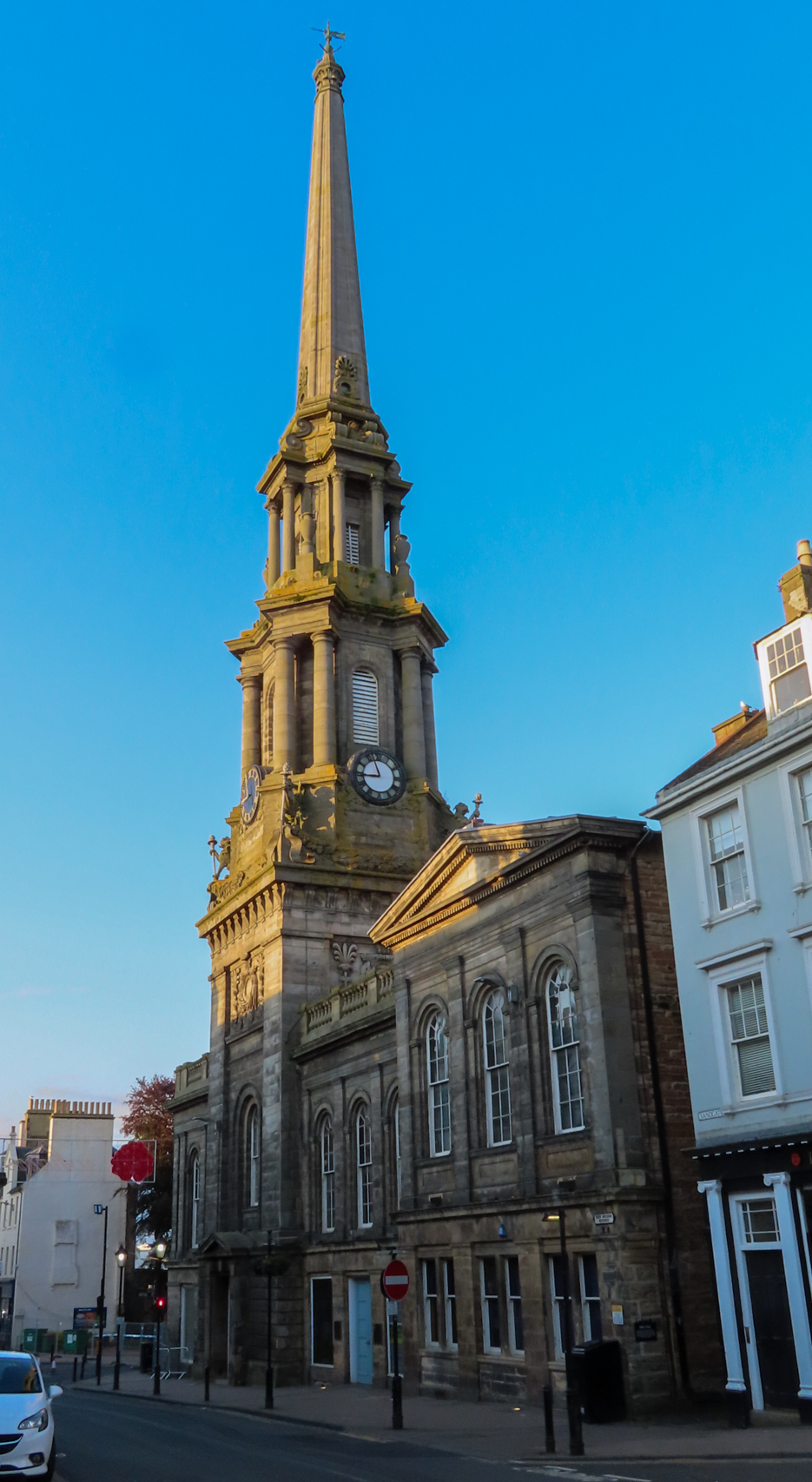
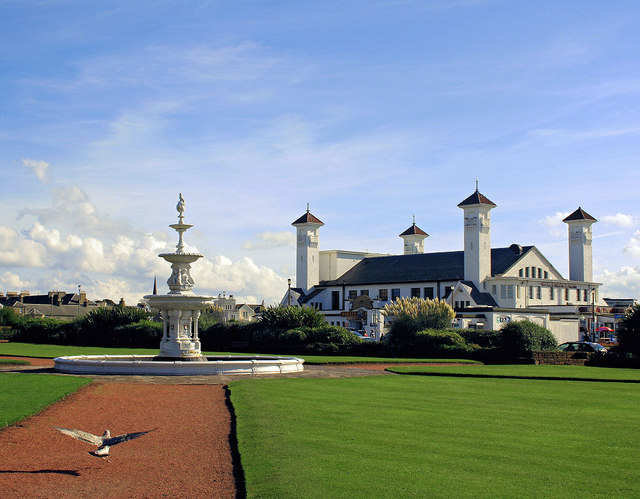
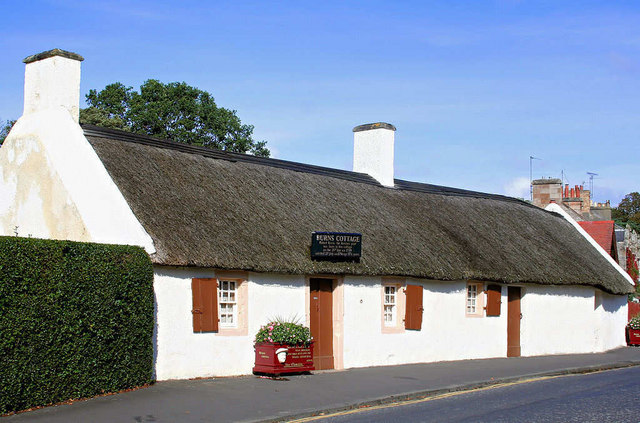
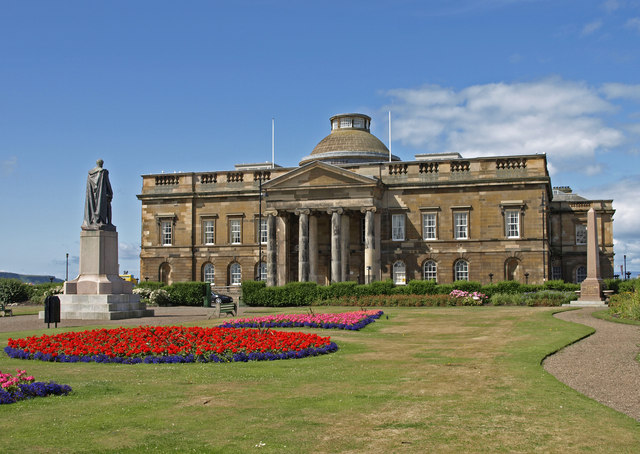
- Burns Statue Square Ayr Town Hall Pavilion building and Place De Saint-Germain-en-Laye fountain Burns Cottage Wellington Square Gardens

- Coat of Arms

- Location within Scotland Location within South Ayrshire
- Population: 46,182 (2022)
- OS grid reference: NS 33853 21445
  - Edinburgh: 66 mi (106 km)
  - London: 330 mi (530 km)
- Council area: South Ayrshire
- Lieutenancy area: Ayrshire and Arran
- Country: Scotland
- Sovereign state: United Kingdom
- Post town: AYR
- Postcode district: KA6-KA8
- Dialling code: 01292
- UK Parliament: Ayr, Carrick and Cumnock
- Scottish Parliament: Ayr

Ayr (/ɛər/ AIR; Scots: Ayr; Scottish Gaelic: Inbhir Àir meaning "confluence of the River Àir") is a town situated on the southwest coast of Scotland. A former royal burgh, today it is the administrative centre of South Ayrshire Council, and the historic county town of Ayrshire. With a population of 46,182 in 2022, Ayr is the 15th largest settlement in Scotland and second largest town in Ayrshire by population. The town is contiguous with the smaller town of Prestwick to the north. Ayr submitted unsuccessful bids for city status in 2000 and 2002, and as part of the wider South Ayrshire area in 2022.

Ayr was established as a Royal Burgh in 1205 and is the county town of Ayrshire. It served as Ayrshire's central marketplace and harbour throughout the medieval period and was a port during the early modern period. On the southern bank of the River Ayr sit the ramparts of a citadel constructed by Oliver Cromwell's men during the mid-17th century. Towards the south of the town is the birthplace of Scottish poet Robert Burns in the suburb of Alloway. Ayr has been a popular tourist resort since the expansion of the railway in 1840 owing to the town's fine beach and its links to golfing and Robert Burns.

Ayr is one of the largest retail centres in the south of Scotland and in 2014 was recognised by the Royal Society for Public Health as the second healthiest town centre in the United Kingdom. Ayr has hosted the Scottish Grand National horseracing steeplechase annually since 1965 and the Scottish International Airshow annually since 2014. The town also accommodates the headquarters of the Ayr Advertiser and Ayrshire Post newspapers.

== Etymology ==
The name Ayr can be traced back to a pre-Celtic word meaning "watercourse" or "strong river". This name was used before the establishment of the Julian calendar in reference to the River Ayr. The town was formerly known as "Inverair" or "Inverayr", meaning "mouth of the river Ayr"; this was later abbreviated to "Air", now spelled "Ayr". The full name remains in the Scottish Gaelic name for Ayr – Inbhir Àir.

== History ==
=== Establishment and early settlement ===
The areas surrounding modern day Ayr were known to have been occupied by Mesolithic hunter-gatherers more than 5,000 years ago. There is also a Neolithic standing stone at the end of Stonefield Park in Doonfoot, which is believed to have been upended as a place of sun worship by Stone Age people. In 1197, King William the Lion ordered that a new castle be built between the River Ayr and the River Doon. It is believed that the castle was a wooden structure built around Montgomerie Terrace. Ayr was later established as a royal burgh and market town on 21 May 1205 by King William the Lion. At its establishment, the burgh encompassed a single street (The Sandgate) and the Church of St John. By 1225 the town reached as far as Carrick Street and Mill Street along the south side of the River Ayr. The town grew quickly to become the main seaport, marketplace and administrative centre for Ayrshire.

The King gifted fishing rights to the burgh for the River Ayr and the River Doon in 1236. In the following year, a timber bridge was built across the River Ayr, linking the town to the north side of the river. Since 1261, annual fairs were held in the town. At this time the town had a recorded population of 1,500 and served as a major port on the west coast. The town was unsuccessfully attacked by Norwegian forces in 1263 and invaded and occupied by English forces from 1296 until 1312 as part of the Scottish Wars of Independence. In 1298 the original castle at Ayr was destroyed by Robert The Bruce's forces. On 26 April 1315, a Parliament of Scotland was held in Ayr by Robert The Bruce at St. John's Tower by the sea. As a Royal Burgh, Ayr was afforded various privileges relating to trade, tolls and fishing rights, which allowed the town to out-compete the neighbouring free burgh of Newton-on-Ayr which was established in the 14th century and situated on the north side of the River Ayr.

=== Early modern period ===
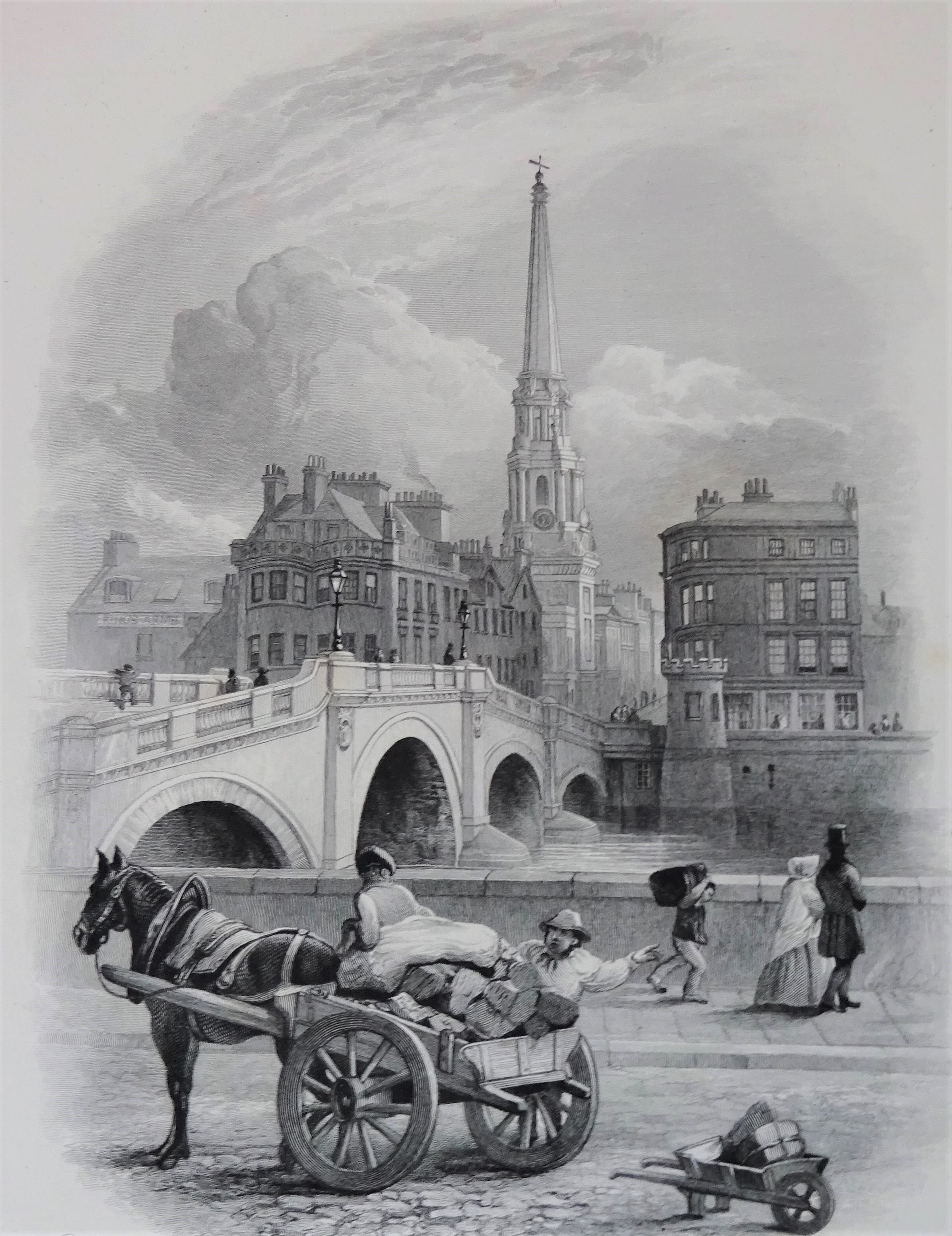
New Bridge of Ayr, 1855

Ayr was frequently hit by plagues between 1545 and 1647, resulting in the town's port being quarantined and plague victims being removed from the town on pain of death. Mary, Queen of Scots visited the town in 1552 and 1563. Ayr remained a significant port throughout the 16th century, exporting goods such as fish, hide and wool and importing salt and wine.

Ayr played a pivotal role in the Plantation of Ulster throughout the 17th century, in which a significant number of British people settled in present-day Northern Ireland. The town provided the largest share of colonists from Great Britain, with many colonists from Ayr joining the Earl of Eglinton, Hugh Montgomery's, plant in the Ards Peninsula (particularly around Newtownards), and others going on to settle around Belfast. In 1652, the town was used as a base and fortress for some of Oliver Cromwell's men. They established a large fortress along the mouth of the River Ayr and erected walls around the area just south of the river's mouth – most of these walls remain present to this day. St John's Tower, which sat around the centre of the fortress, was originally part of a large church yet this was knocked down during the construction of the fort with the tower being used for military practice; it is now protected by "Friends of Saint Johns Tower" (FROST) residents in the "Ayr Fort Area" which sits atop the former site of the citadel. In 1654, a replacement church for St John's, the Auld Kirk of Ayr was completed.

The lands occupied by the fort were granted to the Earl of Eglinton, Alexander Montgomerie, in 1663, who established the separate Burgh of Regality named Montgomerieston around the fort, which was eventually absorbed into the Burgh of Ayr. The separate village of Alloway to the south-east of Ayr was also annexed by the town in 1691, despite numerous petitions against this to Edinburgh from residents of the village. Although the importation of French wine continued to be Ayr's most important trade during the 17th century, the port was one of the first in Scotland to establish regular trade links with the English colonies in the Americas. This commenced during the 1640s when the English Civil War disrupted established colonial trading arrangements, and during the Cromwellian occupation there was free trade between Scotland and the English colonies. Following the 1660 Restoration of the monarchy, the Navigation Acts excluded Scottish ships from this trade apart from a few exceptional cases. Several English merchants had settled in Ayr during the Cromwellian occupation, and they collaborated with local merchants in circumventing the Navigation Acts by disguising Ayr ships as English vessels. Tobacco, sugar and indigo were imported, and salted fish, meat, clothing and indentured servants were exported.

Deposits of coal were found and mined in Newton during the 17th century, resulting in the town becoming a base for the industry, with coal being exported abroad from its harbour. At this time, Ayr's population is estimated to have been at around 2,000. By the late 17th century and early 18th century, Ayr was widely regarded as a town in decline, with Daniel Defoe remarking in A tour thro' the whole island of Great Britain "The capital of this country is Air, a sea-port, and as they tell us, was formerly a large city, had a good harbour, and a great trade: I must acknowledge to you, that tho' I believe it never was a city, yet it has certainly been a good town, and much bigger than it is now: At present like an old beauty, it shews the ruins of a good face; but is also apparently not only decay'd and declin'd, but decaying and declining every day, and from being the fifth town in Scotland, as the townsmen say, is now like a place so saken; the reason of its decay, is, the decay of its trade, so true is it, that commerce is the life of nations, of cities towns, harbours, and of the whole prosperity of a country: What the reason of the decay of trade here was, or when it first began to decay, is hard to determine; nor are the people free to tell, and, perhaps, do not know themselves. There is a good river here, and a handsome stone bridge of four arches."

=== Treaty of Union ===
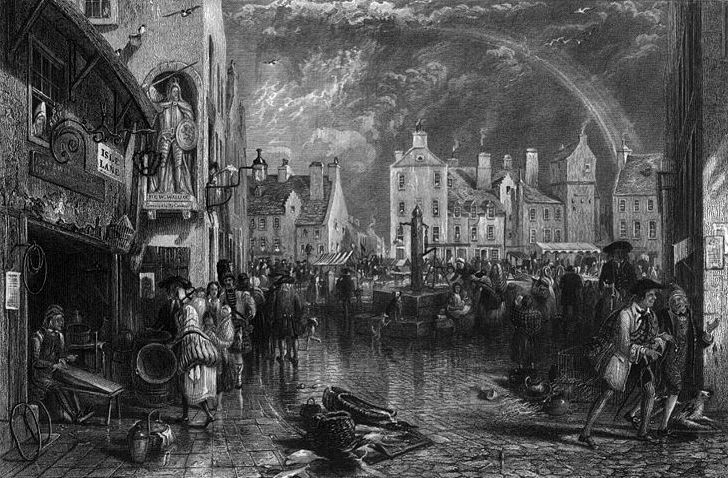
Ayr Market Cross in 1810

Ayr Harbour Act 1772
- Act of Parliament
- Parliament of Great Britain
- Long title: An act for deepening, cleaning, scouring, preserving, and maintaining, the harbour of Ayr; for enlarging and improving the quays and piers; for erecting docks, breasts, jettees, and piers; and for regulating ships, lighters, and other vessels, trading into and going out of the said harbour; and for other purposes therein mentioned.
- Citation: 12 Geo. 3. c. 22
- Territorial extent: Great Britain

Dates
- Royal assent: 16 April 1772
- Commencement: 21 January 1772 (Note: Start of session.)

Status: Current legislation

Text of statute as originally enacted

The formation of the Kingdom of Great Britain through the Acts of Union 1707 was initially harmful to Ayr, due to the importance to its economy of the wine trade with France. The terms of the English Methuen Treaty of 1703, which favoured the importation of Portuguese and Spanish wines and was accompanied by punitive duties on French wines, were extended to Scotland. However, the Union provided Ayr with significant trading opportunities with Britain's colonies around the world and resulted in improvements to the town's infrastructure, with Ayr's textile, wool, linen and shoemaking industries thriving as a result. A small lighthouse was constructed on the River Ayr in 1712, followed by a quay in 1713. Repairs to the town's Harbour and High Tolbooth took place between 1724 and 1726, with funding provided by the Convention of Royal Burghs. Street lighting was installed around the town centre in 1747. A sugar refinery at the harbour was in operation during the 1770s.

The grounds of Alloway were sold in 1754 to help pay off Ayr burgh's public debts, resulting in the establishment of the Belleisle and Rozelle estates to the south of the town, which are now public parks. Rozelle was acquired by Robert Hamilton, who named his estate after one of his plantations in Jamaica. In 1760, Wallacetown was formed to the east of Newton by the Wallaces of Craigie House. Ayr Racecourse was established in 1777. The "New Brig" of Ayr was constructed in 1785–88 and rebuilt in 1877 after severe flooding. In 1792 and 1817, Parliament passed acts to deepen and maintain Ayr's Harbour. During this period Ayr's population was estimated to be around 4,000.

A permanent military presence was established in the town with the completion of Ayr Barracks (later known as Churchill Barracks) on the citadel site in 1795. Ayr Town Hall was designed by Thomas Hamilton and completed in 1832.

=== Population growth ===
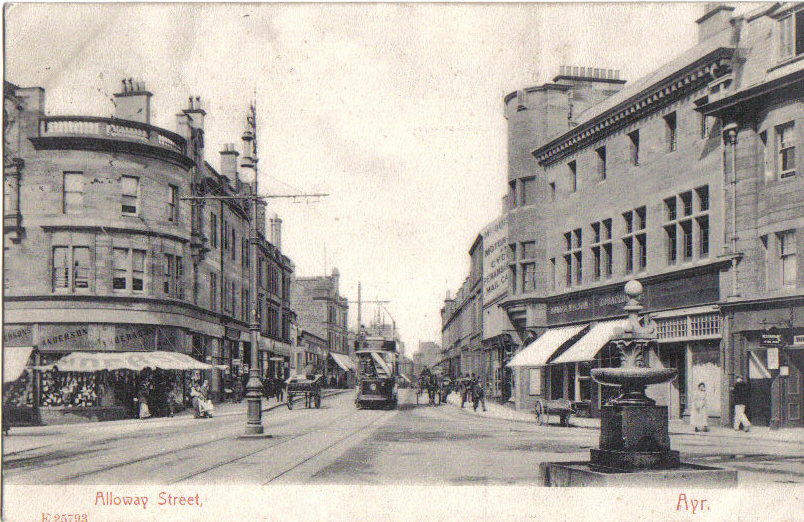
Alloway Street in Ayr, c. 1904

In 1801, the parish of Ayr had a recorded population of just under 5,500, with the adjoining burgh of Newton to the north having a population of just under 1,700 people. By 1826 Ayr's streets were lit by gas and by 1842 Ayr had a water supply, with sewers being dug soon after. Ayr was connected to Glasgow, and thus the rest of Great Britain, by rail in 1839, with the first service operating in August 1840 to a terminus on North Harbour Street. This led to a significant expansion in Ayr's tourist industry due to its attractive, sandy beach and links to Robert Burns. In 1857 a line was built from Dalmellington to export iron from Waterside and a new station was built to replace the old station called "Ayr Townhead Station". In 1877 a line was built between Newton and Mauchline for the export of coal. By 1851 Ayr's population was 21,000 and by 1855 between 60,000 and 70,000 tonnes of coal were being exported to Ireland from Ayr's Harbour each year, with imports of hide and tallow coming into the harbour from South America and beef, butter, barley, yarn and linen being imported into the harbour from Ireland. In 1854, 84,330 tonnes of goods were exported from the town and 36,760 tonnes were imported into the town. Other prominent industries in Ayr at this time included fishing, tanning and shoemaking, with several sawmills, woollen mills and carpet weavers located in the town as well. Timber and tobacco were also traded between Ayr's Harbour and North America.

The Burgh of Ayr Act 1873 resulted in Newton and Wallacetown being absorbed into the Burgh of Ayr. Newton's more industrial character has left the town today divided into two distinct areas, with areas south of the River Ayr incorporating a mixture of affluent Victorian residential suburbs and modern suburban developments, in contrast to more deprived and industrial areas to the north of the river. When elected county councils were created in 1890 under the Local Government (Scotland) Act 1889, the burgh of Ayr was deemed capable of running its own affairs and so was excluded from the jurisdiction of Ayrshire County Council, although the county council chose to meet at County Buildings in the town. The Carnegie Library was opened in Ayr on 2 September 1893. By the turn of the century, Ayr's population was around 31,000 people. The Burns Statue Square drill hall was completed in 1901 and the Wellington Square drill hall was probably completed shortly after that.

On 26 September 1901, a tram service was opened between Prestwick Cross in Prestwick and St Leonards in Ayr. This was expanded south the following year to Alloway, and east in 1913 to the Racecourse at Whitletts. The tram service was eventually shut due to expensive repair costs, with the last tram running on New Year's Eve in 1931.

=== Fishing ===
The annual reports of the Fishery Board for Scotland provide an insight into the state of fishing from Ayr in the years before the First World War. Catches consisted of herrings, mackerel, haddocks, whitings and plaice.

Fishery Statistics

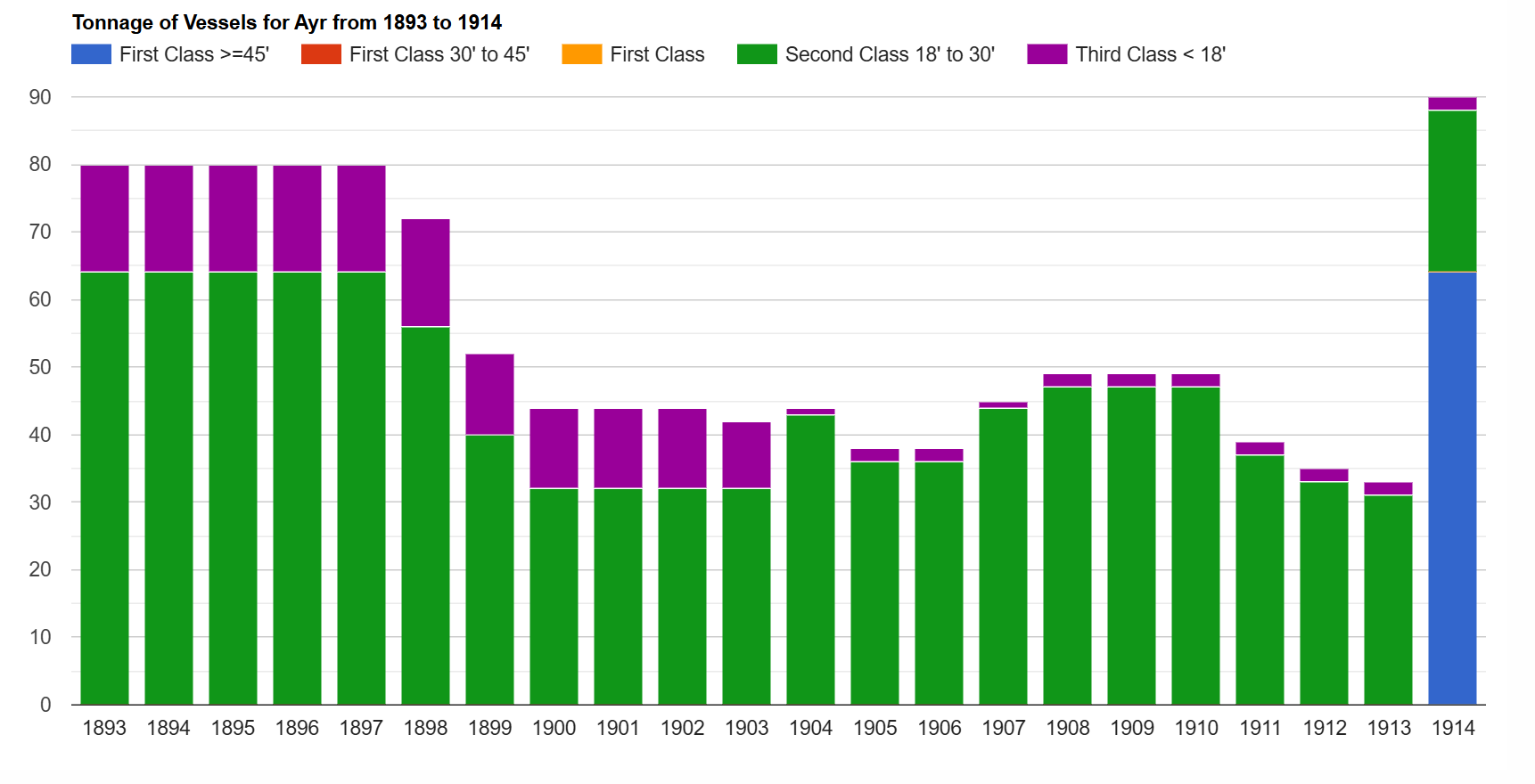
Tonnage of vessels

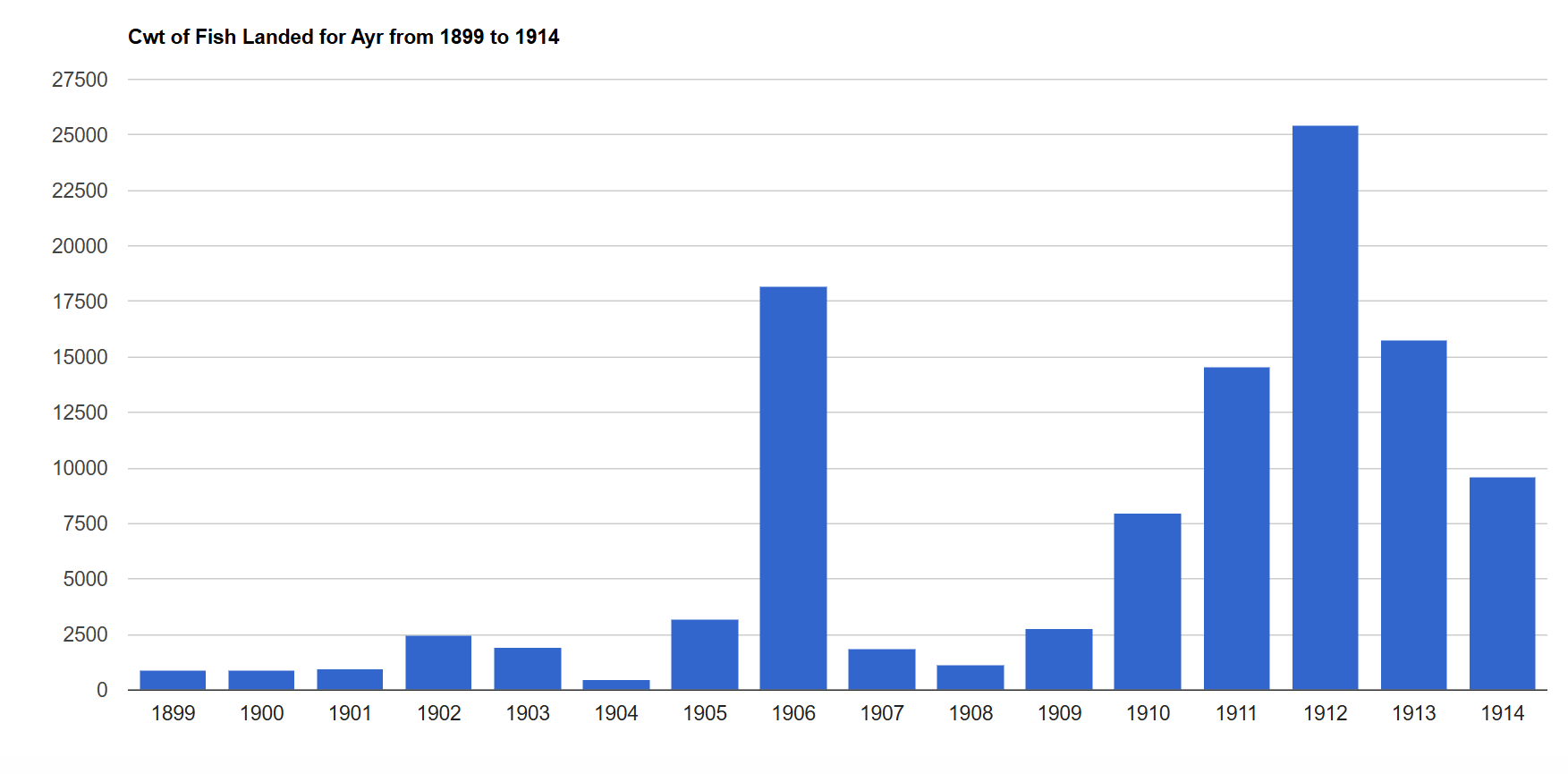
Cwt of fish landed

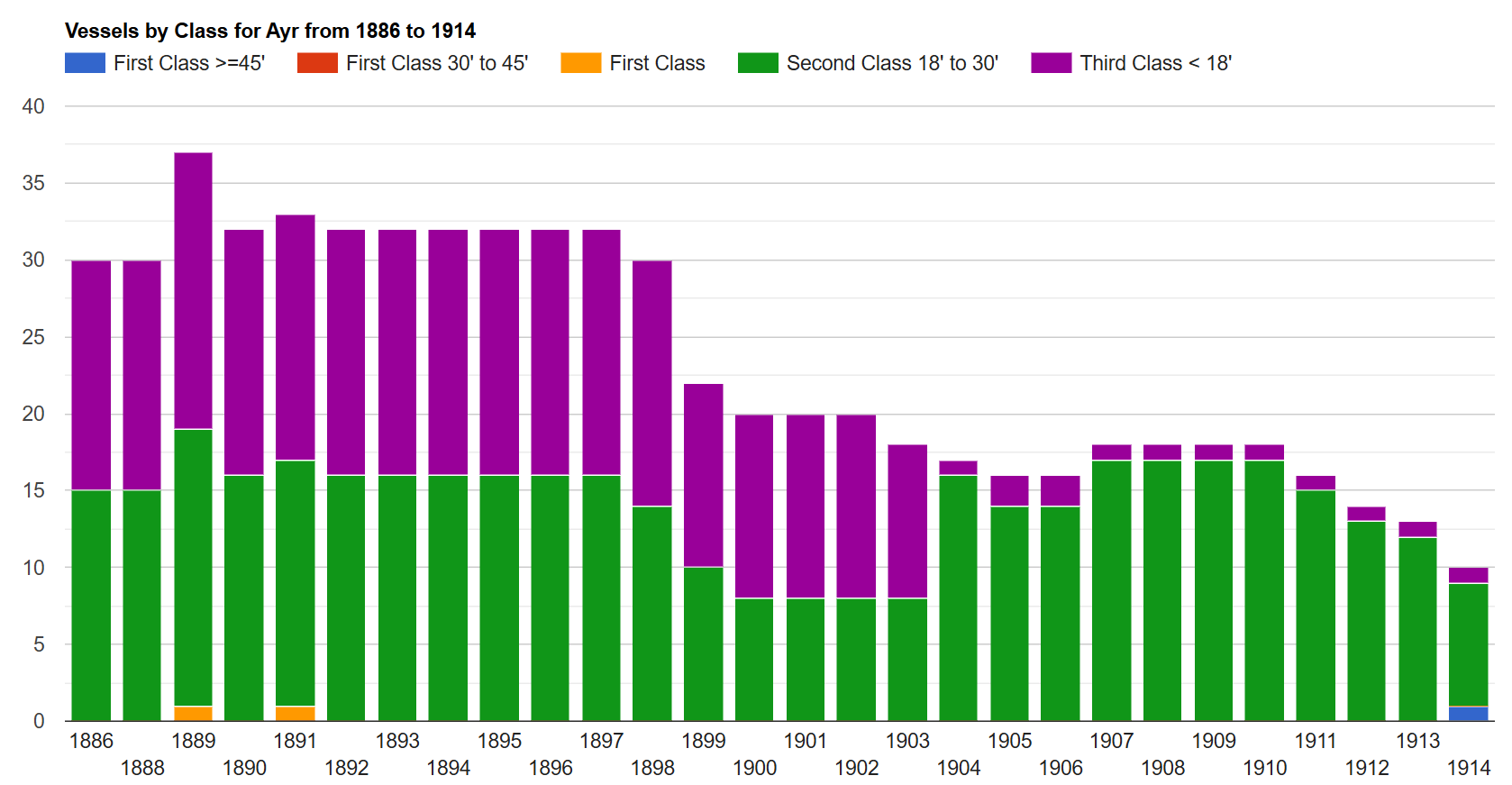
Vessels by class

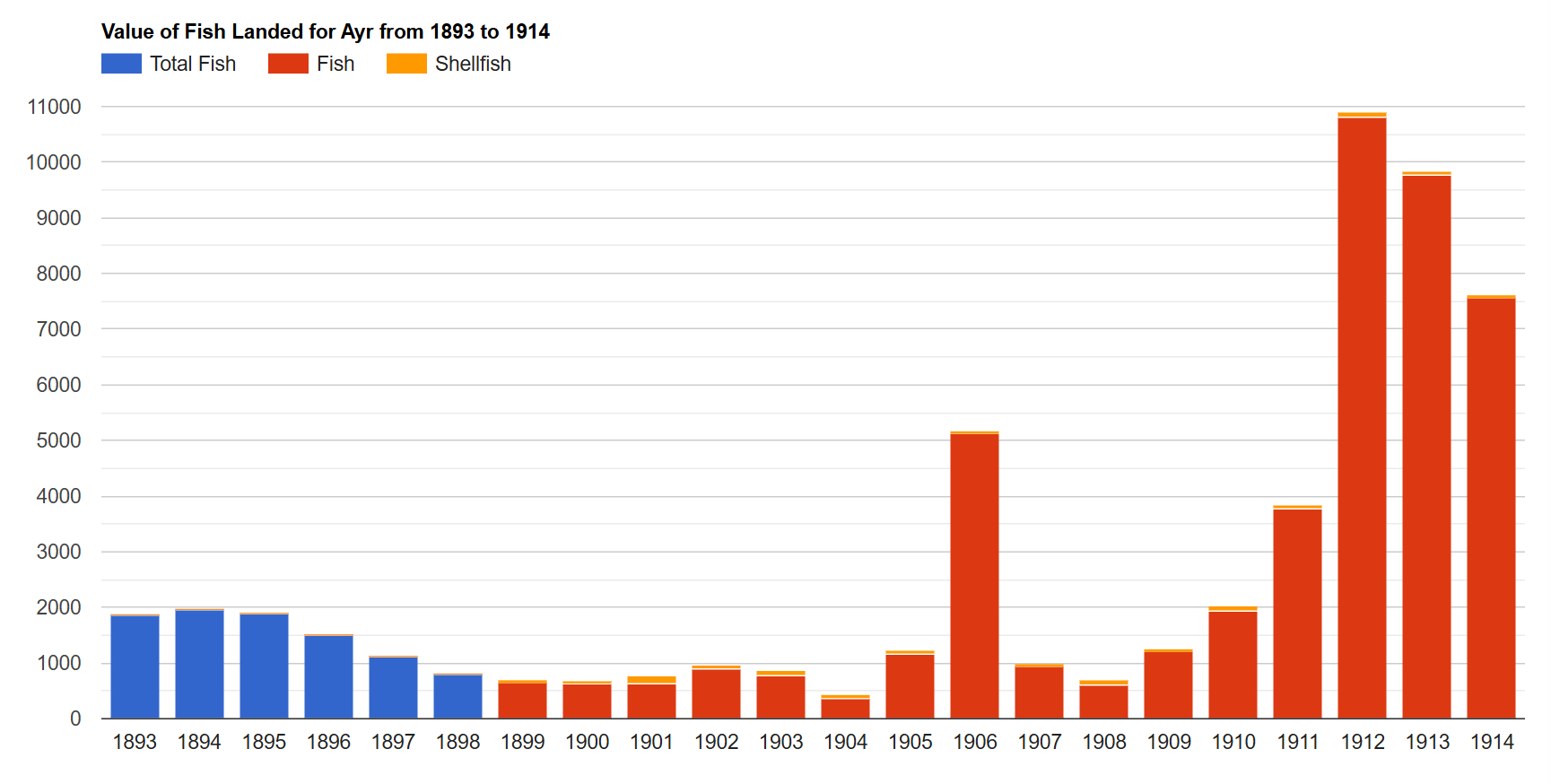
Value (£) of fish landed

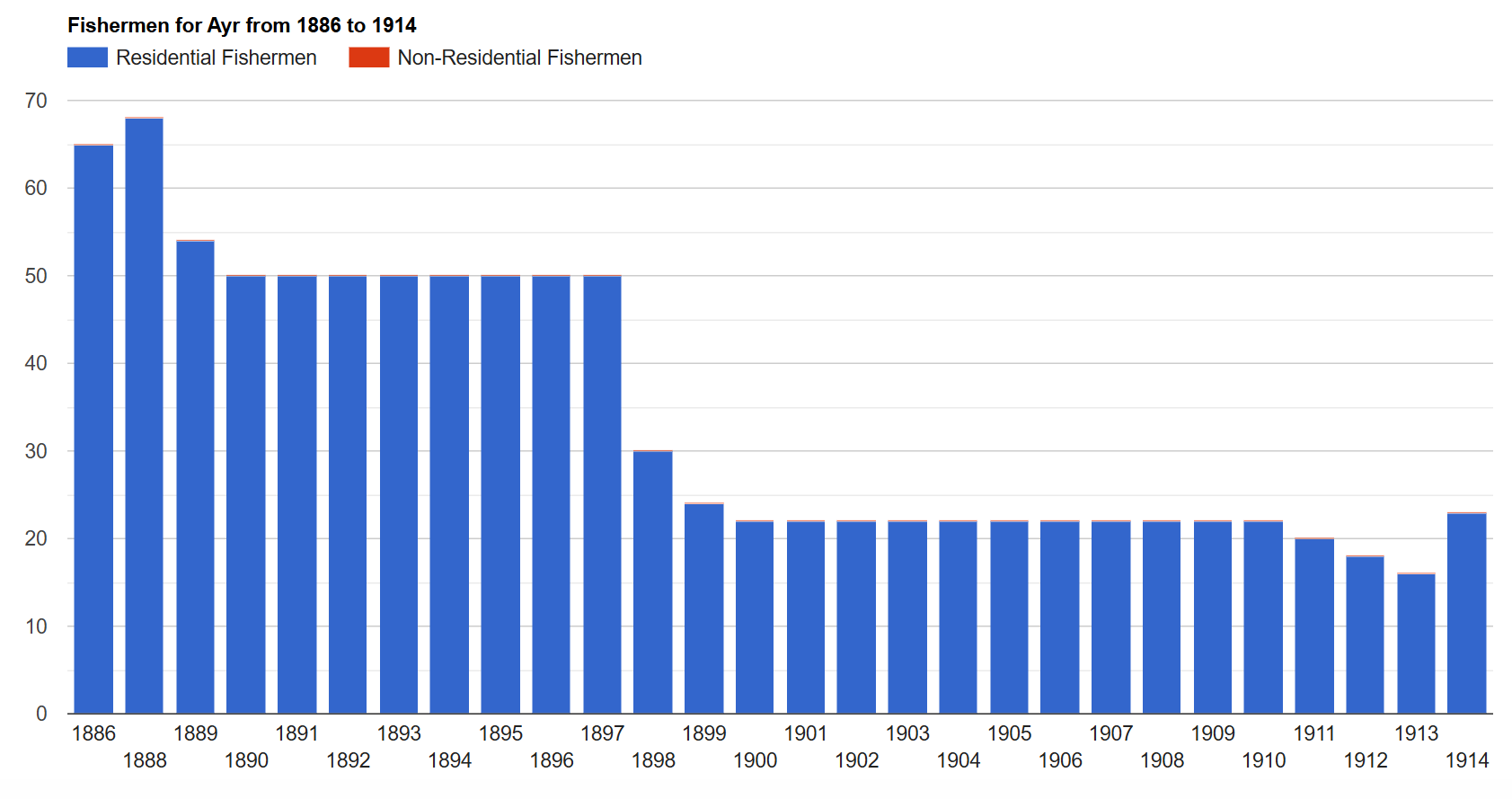
Fishermen

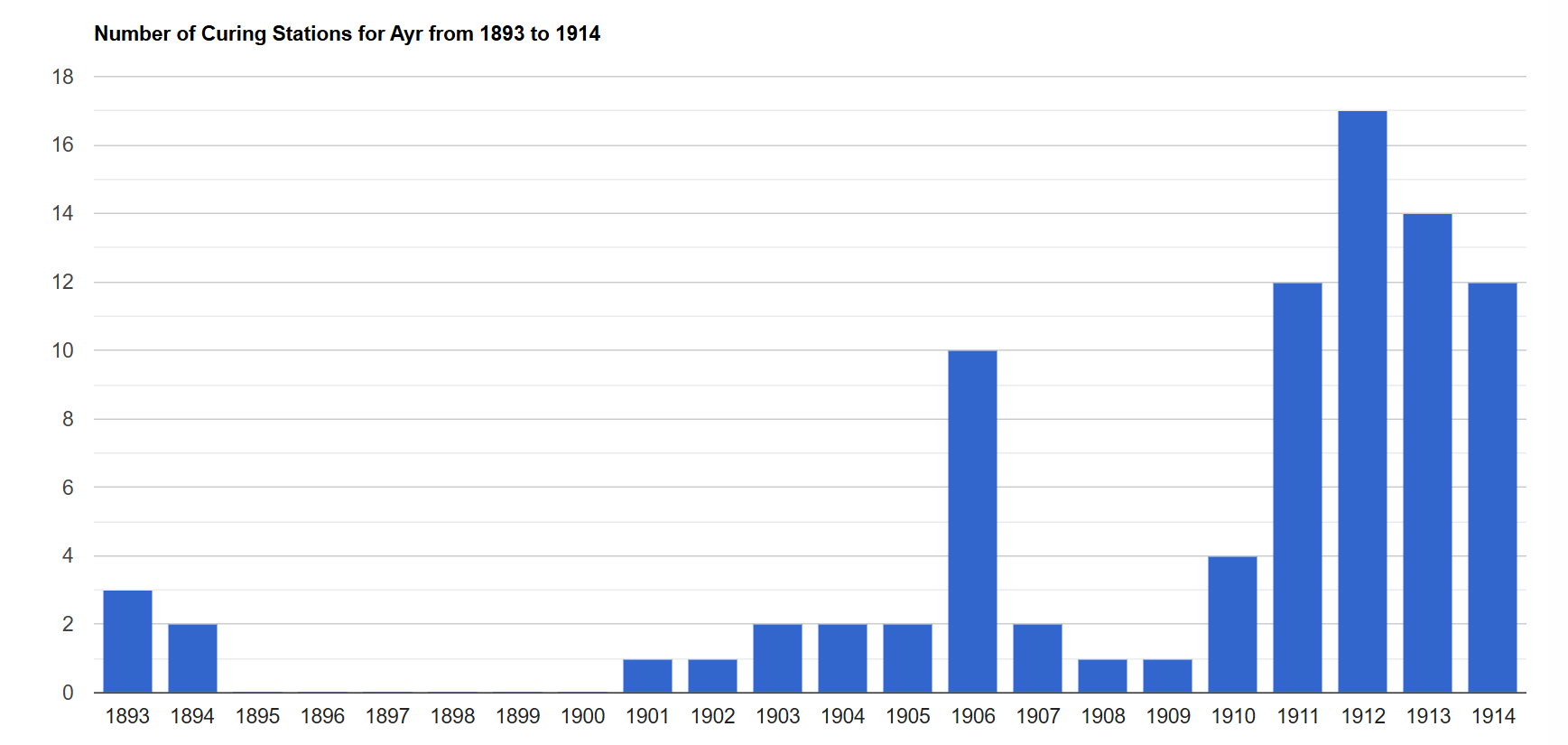
Number of curing stations

The higher result for 1912 is explained as follows: "Ayr shows a considerable increase in herrings, while the landings at Dunure and Maidens exhibit noticeable decreases. The crews of the latter creeks however, contributed larely to the Ayr catch".

=== Modern history ===
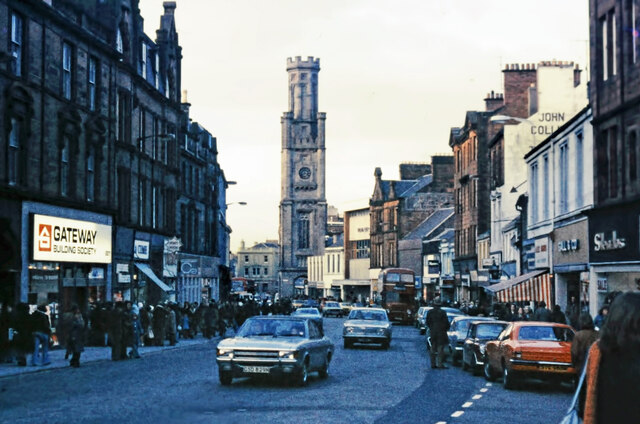
High Street in May 1980

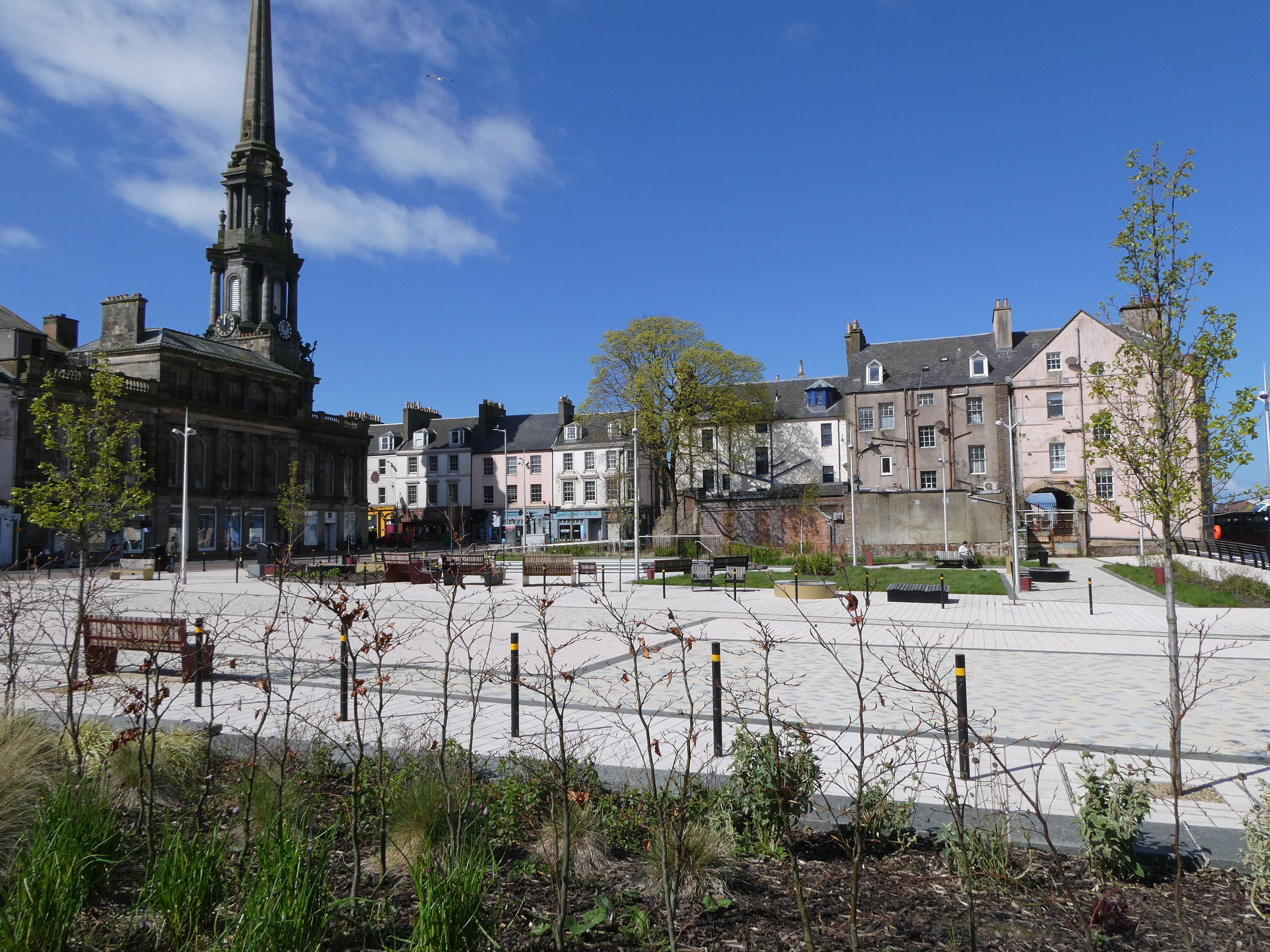
The new plaza development in the town centre contains the new Cutty Sark Centre

817 men from Ayr died during the First World War. A memorial was unveiled at Wellington Square in 1924 dedicated to those who died, with other memorials being put up at Alloway Village Hall and Whitletts Cross.

Ayr's growing population following the war resulted in significant slum clearance and redevelopment around the town centre, with the development of new housing estates on the periphery of the town. The lands surrounding Woodfield House were acquired by the council in 1919 to build council housing on, with the first residents moving in 1921. Further local government reform in 1930 brought the burgh of Ayr within the area controlled by Ayrshire County Council, but classed as a large burgh, which allowed the town to continue to run many local services itself. The burgh boundaries were expanded in 1935 to include Alloway, Castlehill, Doonfoot and Whitletts. In the 1930s, council estates were also developed at Lochside and Heathfield. The mining villages of Dalmilling and Whitletts were also cleared and developed into sizeable council estates.

Following the Second World War, more council housing was developed in Ayr at Kincaidston, with the Wallacetown and Whitletts estates being expanded. Suburban housing was also developed at Alloway, Doonfoot and Holmston, and many disused industrial buildings throughout the town were redeveloped into flats.

In 2000, as part of the Millennium celebrations, Ayr submitted an unsuccessful bid for city status, losing to Inverness, and again submitted an unsuccessful bid two years later in 2002 as part of the Golden Jubilee of Elizabeth II, losing to Stirling. In 2021, South Ayrshire Council announced a South Ayrshire wider bid, which would include Ayr. This bid was part of the granting of city status to towns to honour the Queen's Platinum Jubilee in 2022. Again, the bid was unsuccessful, with the region losing to Dunfermline.

In 2019, GUARD Archaeology team led by Iraia Arabaolaza uncovered a marching camp dating to the 1st century AD, used by Roman legions during the invasion of Roman General Agricola. According to Arabaolaza, the fire pits were split 30 meters apart into two parallel lines. The findings also included clay-domed ovens and 26 fire pits dated to between 77- 86 AD and 90 AD loaded with burn and charcoal contents. Archaeologists suggested that this site had been chosen as a strategic location for the Roman conquest of Ayrshire.

== Governance ==
=== Parliamentary representation ===
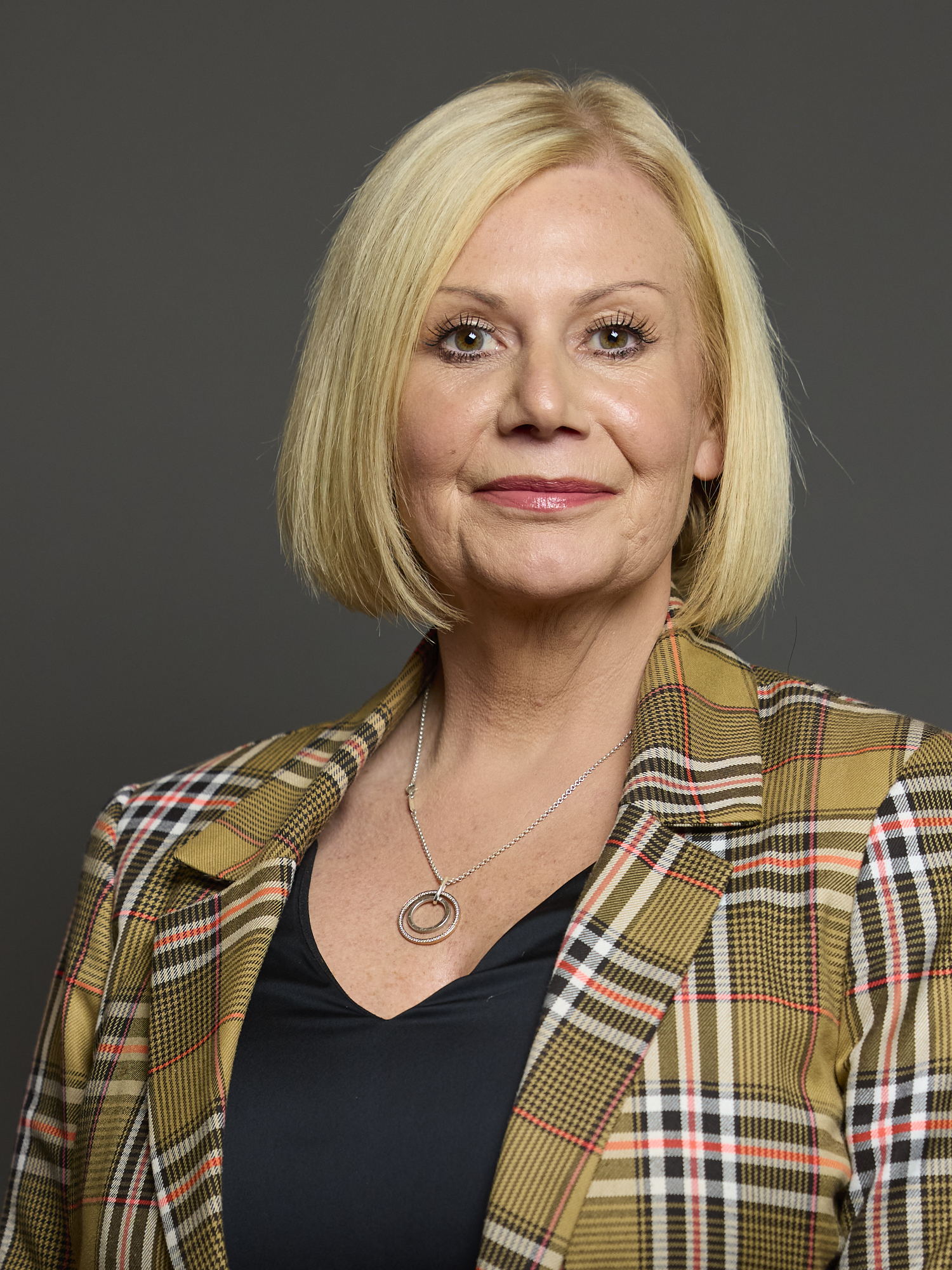
Elaine Stewart has been the MP for Ayr since 2024

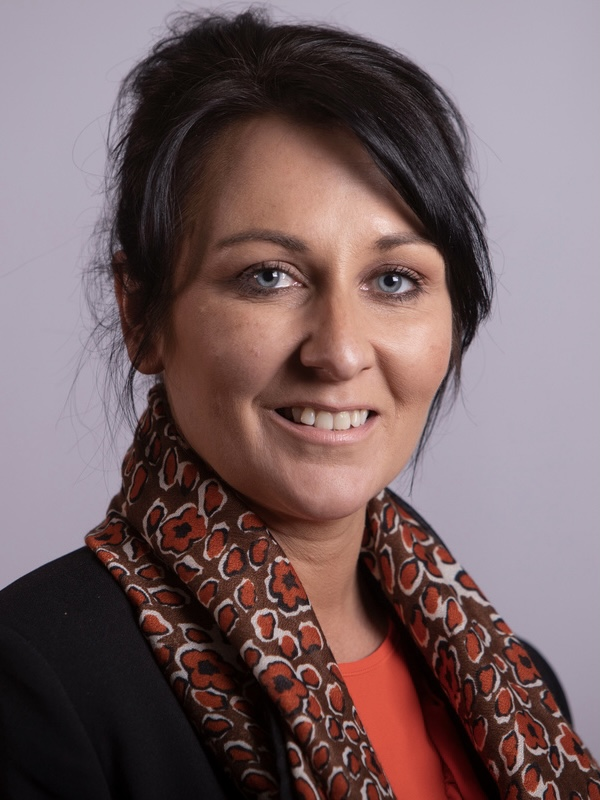
Siobhian Brown has been the MSP for Ayr since 2021

Ayr was represented by a Conservative MP continuously for a period of 91 years – from 1906 (as part of the Ayr Burghs constituency) until 1997, followed by Labour from 1997 to 2015, and the Scottish National Party from 2015 to 2017. The town forms part of the Ayr constituency in the Scottish Parliament, which was the first Conservative constituency seat in the Parliament, but has been represented by Scottish National Party (SNP) MSP Siobhian Brown since the 2021 Scottish Parliament election. In the UK Parliament, Ayr is situated within the Ayr, Carrick and Cumnock constituency which was represented by Conservative MP Bill Grant from the 2017 general election, until he was unseated in the 2019 general election by Allan Dorans of the Scottish National Party.

Ayr forms part of the UK parliamentary constituency of Ayr, Carrick and Cumnock. This constituency includes Carrick and Coylton in South Ayrshire in addition to Doon Valley, Cumnock and New Cumnock in southern East Ayrshire. The seat was held by Conservative Bill Grant from 2017 until 2019 when Allan Dorans gained the seat for the Scottish National Party. The Central Ayrshire constituency runs north of the Ayr, Carrick and Cumnock constituency. It takes in the towns of Irvine, Kilwinning, Prestwick, Troon and rural Kyle, running into Annbank. It also incorporates the Woodfield area of Newton-on-Ayr and is represented by SNP MP Philippa Whitford.

In previous elections Ayr was represented in Westminster as part of the Ayr parliamentary constituency, the boundaries of which included elements of Prestwick, Troon and rural South Ayrshire. The seat was abolished in 2005 to be replaced by the Ayr, Carrick and Cumnock and Central Ayrshire constituencies which were subsequently represented by MP's belonging to Labour, and later, the SNP. From the seat's creation in 1950 until the 1997 general election Ayr was continually represented by MP's from the Conservative Party. George Younger served as Member of Parliament for the constituency for most of this period – serving as MP for Ayr from 1964 to 1992. In 1997 the boundaries of the constituency were altered in a move which saw the Conservative areas of Alloway, Doonfoot and Masonhill alongside parts of Kincaidston and Forehill being transferred to the neighbouring Carrick, Cumnock and Doon Valley constituency, benefiting the Labour Party. Prior to this Ayr formed part of the Ayr Burghs constituency which combined various towns along the Ayrshire coast such as Irvine, Troon, Prestwick, Ardrossan and Saltcoats: this seat was held by the Conservatives from 1906 until the constituency's abolishment in 1950, making Ayr the longest seat to be held by the Conservatives in Scotland at over 100 years.

In the Scottish Parliament, the Ayr constituency was represented from 2000 to 2021 by Conservative MSP John Scott until he was defeated at the 2021 election by the SNP's Siobhian Brown. It was the first constituency in the Scottish Parliament to elect a Conservative MSP. The constituency also includes the towns of Prestwick and Troon.

Ayr is also represented at Holyrood by the seven MSPs for the South Scotland electoral region.

=== South Ayrshire Council ===
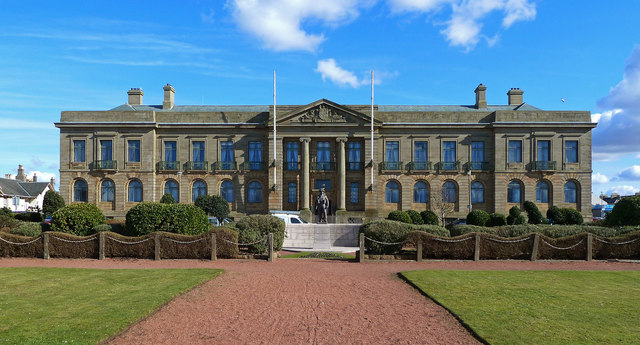
Ayr is the administrative centre of South Ayrshire Council, with County Buildings serving as the headquarters for the council

Ayr is represented by 11 elected councillors on South Ayrshire Council, of which five belong to the Scottish Conservatives, four belong to the Scottish National Party and two belong to Scottish Labour. Below are a list of councillors elected to serve Ayr, sorted by ward:

Ward	Councillors	Party
Ayr North	Laura Brennan-Whitefield	Scottish National Party
Ayr North	Douglas Campbell	Scottish National Party
Ayr North	Ian Davis	Scottish Conservatives
Ayr North	Ian Cavana	Scottish Labour
Ayr East	Mary Kilpatrick	Scottish Conservatives
Ayr East	Chris Cullen	Scottish National Party
Ayr East	Brian McGinley	Scottish Labour
Ayr West	Martin Dowey	Scottish Conservatives
Ayr West	Lee Lyons	Scottish Conservatives
Ayr West	Bob Shields	Independent
Ayr West	George Weir	Scottish National Party

=== Provost of the Royal Burgh of Ayr ===
As a former Royal Burgh, Ayr had a Provost as chief magistrate of the burgh council and the earliest recorded Provost is Nicholas de Fynvyk. The title of provost was retained by Kyle and Carrick District Council and South Ayrshire Council for their civic heads. The role of provost is now apolitical and carries a number of duties including chairing meetings of the council, acting as civic head representing South Ayrshire Council, promotion of South Ayrshire Council and networking with various organisations such as local businesses.

A chain and robes are worn by the provost while undertaking their ceremonial duties. The Provost's chain was donated in June 1897 by James McLennan who was a Glasgow wine and spirit merchant who was born in Coylton and lived in Ayr. The official provost's robes have been provided by the council since 11 June 1923. In addition, South Ayrshire Council erects lamp posts with the Royal Burgh coat of arms emblazoned on the diffusers outside the official resident of the provost – this has been undertaken since 1854.

Each newly elected provost enters their name into a Bible at the "Kirkin 'O The Council" service at Ayr Auld Kirk after each council election. The Bible in which the names are entered was acquired by the Kirk during the Provostship of Hugh Miller (1841–1855). The names of the provosts entered into the Bible are as follows:

Lists of Provosts of Ayr and South Ayrshire Council

List of Ayr provosts
Term	Provost
1841–1855	Hugh Miller
1855–1861	Primrose William Kennedy
1861–1864	Andrew Paterson
1864–1873	John MacNeillie
1873–1876	Robert Goudie
1876–1882	Thomas Steele
1882–1888	William Kilpatrick
1888–1891	James Murray Ferguson
1891–1894	Robert Shankland
1894–1897	Hugh Douglas Willock
1897–1903	Thomas Templeton
1903–1909	William Allan
1909–1912	James Shaw Hunter
1912–1918	John Mitchell
1918–1922	I M Mathie-Morton
1922–1924	Donald McDonald
1924–1927	James Robertson Gould
1927–1930	John S Stewart
1930–1933	Thomas Wilson
1933–1936	Thomas Galloway
1936–1940	James Wills
1940–1943	Robert Bowman
1943–1949	Thomas Murray
1949–1952	James Smith
1952–1955	Adam Hart
1955–1958	William Anderson
1958–1961	William Sidney Lanham
1961–1964	William Cowan
1964–1967	Charles O'Halloran
1967–1970	Alexander S Handyside
1970–1973	Donald McLean
1973–1975	Campbell Howie
1975–1978	Alexander Paton
1978–1980	Charles O'Halloran
1980–1984	James Boyle
1984–1988	Gibson T Macdonald
1988–1992	Daniel MacNeill
1992–1996	Gibson T Macdonald
1996–1998	Robert Campbell
1998–2003	Elizabeth A Foulkes
2003–2006	Gordon S McKenzie
2006–2012	Winifred D Sloan
2012–present	Helen Moonie

The current provost is Labour councillor Helen Moonie. List of Provosts of Ayr from 1560 to 1692, See Annals of Ayr in the olden time, 1560–1692, By John Pagan. Ayr: Alex Fergusson, 18 High Street, 1897.

== Geography ==
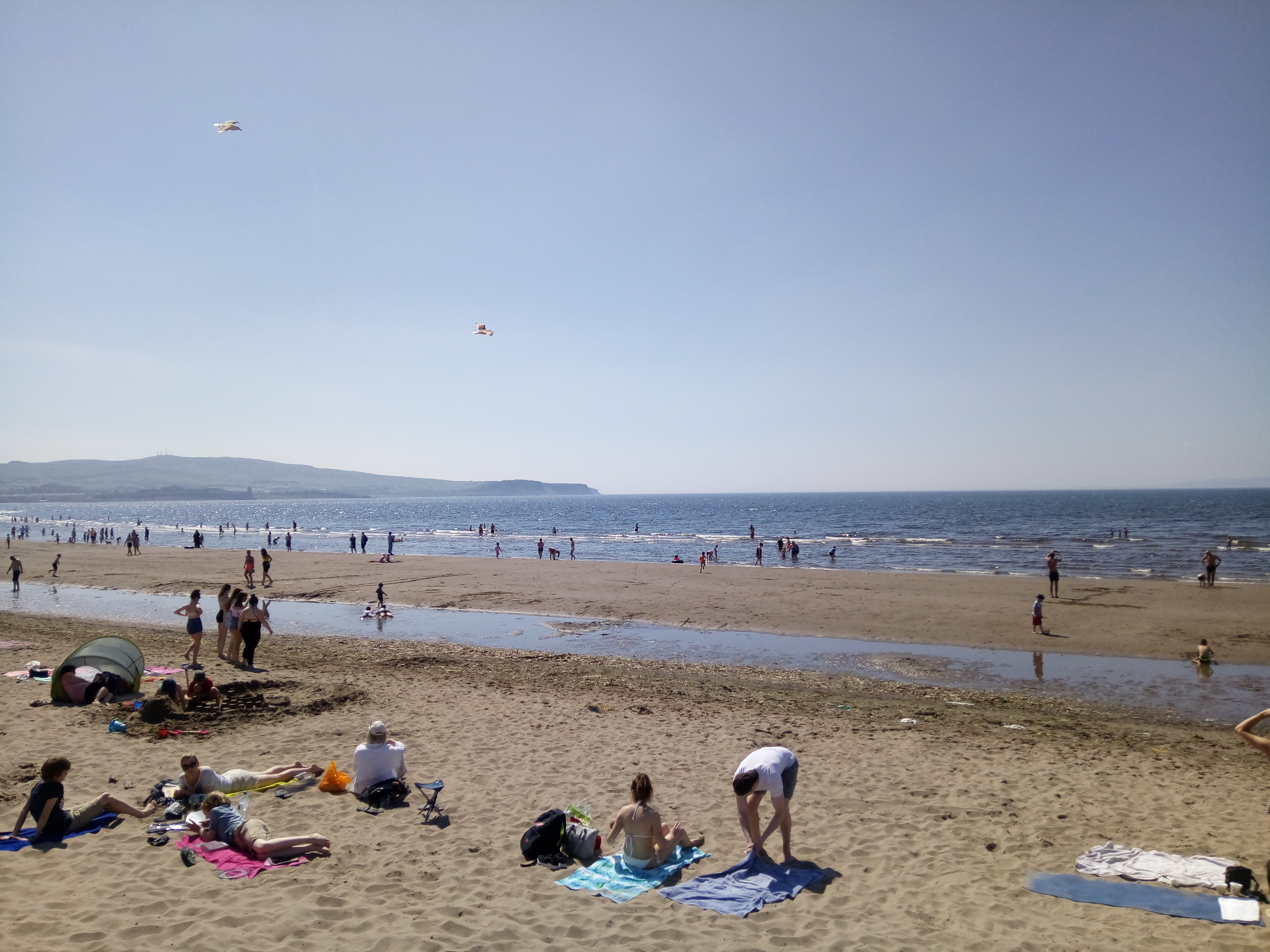
Ayr is located in southwest Scotland, situated on the Firth of Clyde and subsequently the North Atlantic Ocean

=== Location ===
Ayr is a coastal town which lies on the mouth of the River Ayr which flows into the larger Firth of Clyde estuary. From the coast, the Isle of Arran can be seen, and on a very clear day, the northern tip of Northern Ireland is also visible. Ayr is located within the region of Strathclyde, and forms part of the historic county of Ayrshire. Today, it is the largest town and administrative centre of South Ayrshire. Much of the land in and around Ayr is flat and low lying surface, used for rearing dairy cattle. Towards the south of Ayr, however, the land is higher than most areas in the county of Ayrshire, an example of this being the Brown Carrick Hill which is situated due south of Doonfoot. Ayr lies approximately 35 miles (55 km) southwest of Glasgow.

The urban area which encompasses Ayr is defined by the General Register Office for Scotland as the adjoining localities of Ayr and Prestwick − this is the 12th largest urban area in Scotland.

=== Areas of Ayr ===
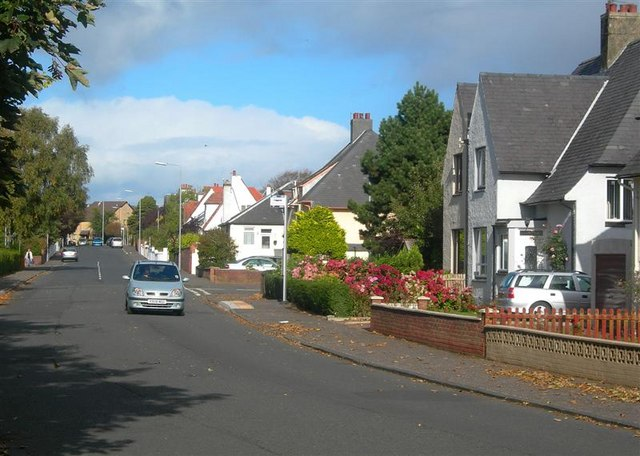
Houses in Belmont Avenue, in the Belmont area of the town

- Alloway:

– Laigh Glengall
– Rozelle

- Belmont
- Braehead
- Castlehill
- Craigie
- Dalmilling
- Doonfoot:

– Bellisle
– Greenan

- Forehill:

– Glencairn

- Fort
- Hayhill
- Heathfield
- Holmston
- Kincaidston
- Lochside
- Masonhill
- Newton-On-Ayr:

– Woodfield

- Old Belmont:

– St Leonard's

- Seafield
- Wallacetown:

– Hawkhill

- White City
- Whitletts

=== Climate ===
The nearest official Met Office weather station to Ayr is Auchincruive, about 3 miles (5 km) to the north-east of Ayr town centre. The area experiences very cool summers and somewhat mild winters. The air is cooler during the summer due to its proximity to the sea as water has a major cooling effect on summer temperatures.

During the winter months the reverse happens and the sea air has a major warming effect on the climate. The area rarely sees extremes, owing to the effects of sea air. Rainfall is generally plentiful throughout the year due to Atlantic weather systems sweeping in from the west. Compared with the rest of Scotland, the area rarely sees much mist and fog due to the land being relatively flat and low lying, and, with the wind blowing across the flatter land, this generally hinders fog from developing widely. This has made Glasgow Prestwick International Airport particularly well known as one of the less fog-prone airports in Scotland. Snowfall is rare in this part of Scotland because of the mild sea air.

Climate data for Auchincruive, (Note: Weather station is located 2.8 miles (4.5 km) from the Ayr town centre.) elevation: 48 m (157 ft), 1981–2010 normals, extremes 1960–present
Month	Jan	Feb	Mar	Apr	May	Jun	Jul	Aug	Sep	Oct	Nov	Dec	Year
Record high °C (°F)	13.6 (56.5)	14.8 (58.6)	19.4 (66.9)	23.5 (74.3)	27.0 (80.6)	29.4 (84.9)	30.0 (86.0)	29.8 (85.6)	24.7 (76.5)	21.0 (69.8)	16.5 (61.7)	14.2 (57.6)	30.0 (86.0)
Mean daily maximum °C (°F)	7.1 (44.8)	7.3 (45.1)	9.1 (48.4)	11.5 (52.7)	14.9 (58.8)	16.9 (62.4)	18.5 (65.3)	18.3 (64.9)	16.1 (61.0)	12.9 (55.2)	9.6 (49.3)	7.3 (45.1)	12.5 (54.5)
Daily mean °C (°F)	4.5 (40.1)	4.6 (40.3)	6.1 (43.0)	7.9 (46.2)	10.7 (51.3)	13.2 (55.8)	15.0 (59.0)	14.8 (58.6)	12.8 (55.0)	9.9 (49.8)	6.9 (44.4)	4.5 (40.1)	9.2 (48.6)
Mean daily minimum °C (°F)	1.8 (35.2)	1.8 (35.2)	3.0 (37.4)	4.3 (39.7)	6.5 (43.7)	9.4 (48.9)	11.5 (52.7)	11.2 (52.2)	9.4 (48.9)	6.9 (44.4)	4.1 (39.4)	1.7 (35.1)	6.0 (42.8)
Record low °C (°F)	−11.7 (10.9)	−12.7 (9.1)	−11.1 (12.0)	−4.1 (24.6)	−3.0 (26.6)	0.2 (32.4)	2.2 (36.0)	1.7 (35.1)	−1.0 (30.2)	−5.1 (22.8)	−8.3 (17.1)	−10.7 (12.7)	−12.7 (9.1)
Average precipitation mm (inches)	101.8 (4.01)	74.0 (2.91)	83.9 (3.30)	53.9 (2.12)	54.0 (2.13)	60.5 (2.38)	73.6 (2.90)	85.7 (3.37)	97.8 (3.85)	116.1 (4.57)	103.6 (4.08)	100.4 (3.95)	1,005.4 (39.58)
Average precipitation days (≥ 1.0 mm)	16.5	12.6	14.4	10.9	10.5	11.1	11.7	13.2	13.3	16.0	15.3	15.1	160.6
Mean monthly sunshine hours	44.3	68.8	98.0	143.0	197.2	169.9	158.6	151.6	117.9	83.4	57.2	40.7	1,330.6
Source 1: Met Office
Source 2: KNMI

== Demographics ==
At the 2001 United Kingdom census, Ayr had a population of 46,431, a fall of −3.2% on 1991. Mid-2008 population estimates placed the total resident population at 46,070 making Ayr the 12th largest urban area in Scotland. The 2011 census found that Ayr's population had grown by around 0.9% since the 2001 census – surpassing the total population growth of Ayr and Prestwick, which only grew by 0.63%, falling short of the national population growth of Scotland of +4.61%.

In 2001, nearly 0.36% (167) people in the town could speak Scottish Gaelic – this fell to 0.34% (161) in 2011. South Ayrshire Council provides no educational support for the language.

Scotland census 2022	Ayr	Scotland
Total population	46,182	5,439,842
Population growth 2011–2022	-1.4%	2.7%
White	97.16%	92.87%
Under 16 years old	15.32%	16.39%
Over 65 years old	25.92%	20.04%
Christian	41%	39%
No Religion	51%	51%

UK census 2011	Ayr	Ayr & Prestwick	Scotland
Total population	46,849	61,750	5,295,403
Population growth 2001–2011	0.90%	0.63%	4.61%
White	98.6%	98.5%	96%
Under 16 years old	16%	15.9%	17.3%
Over 65 years old	21.9%	22.1%	16.8%
Christian	57.9%	58.7%	56.3%
No Religion	35%	34%	36.7%
'British' national identity	28.5%	29.2%	26.7%

UK census 2001	Ayr	Ayr & Prestwick	Scotland
Total population	46,431	61,365	5,062,011
Population growth 1991–2001	−3.19%	−0.07%	1.3%
White	95.9%	97.2%	98.8%
Under 16 years old	17.2%	17.4%	19.2%
Over 65 years old	20.4%	20.5%	16.0%
Christian	69.6%	70.1%	65.1%
No Religion	23.9%	23.8%	27.6%

=== Economy ===
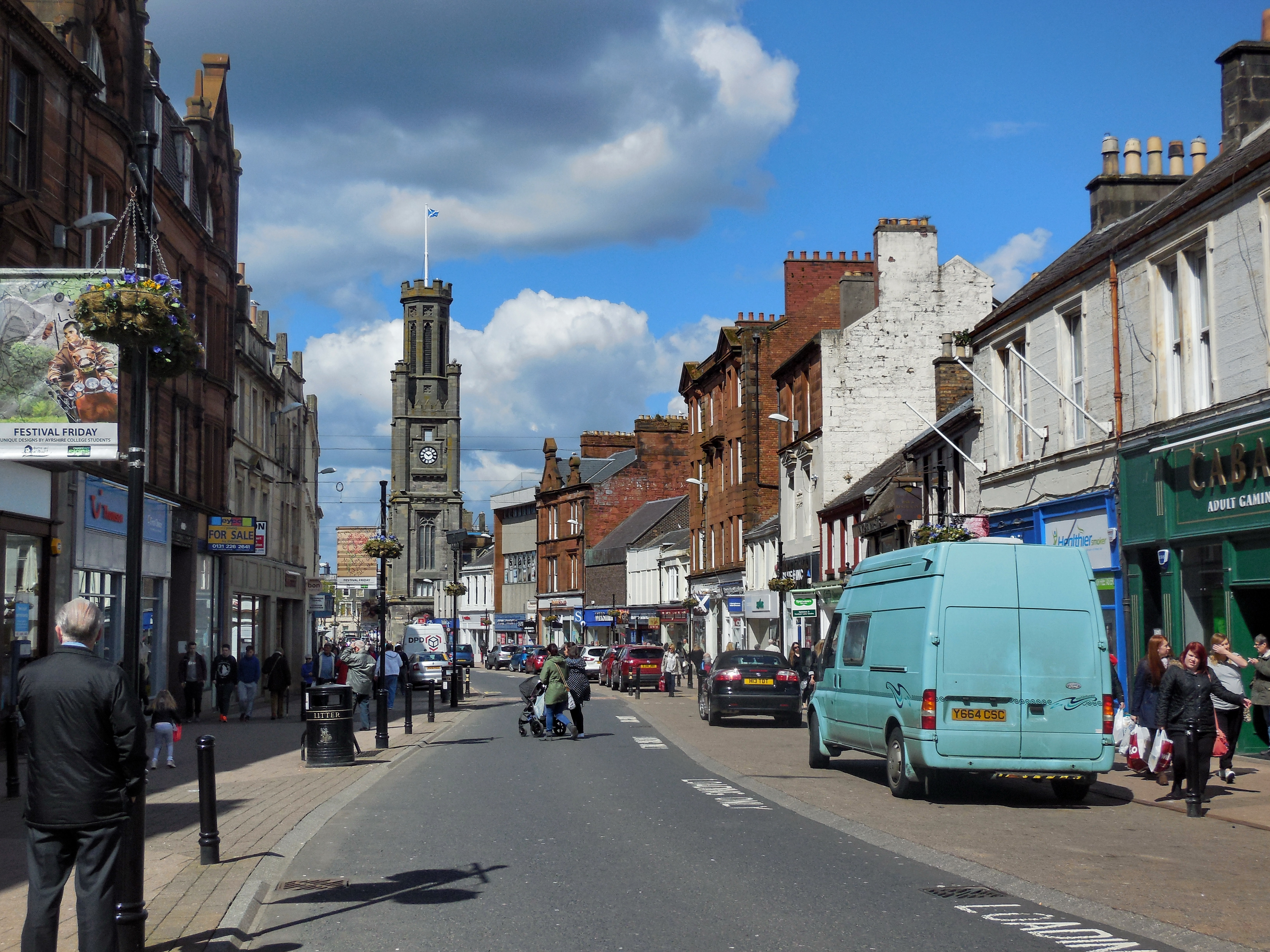
Ayr town centre and main shopping high street

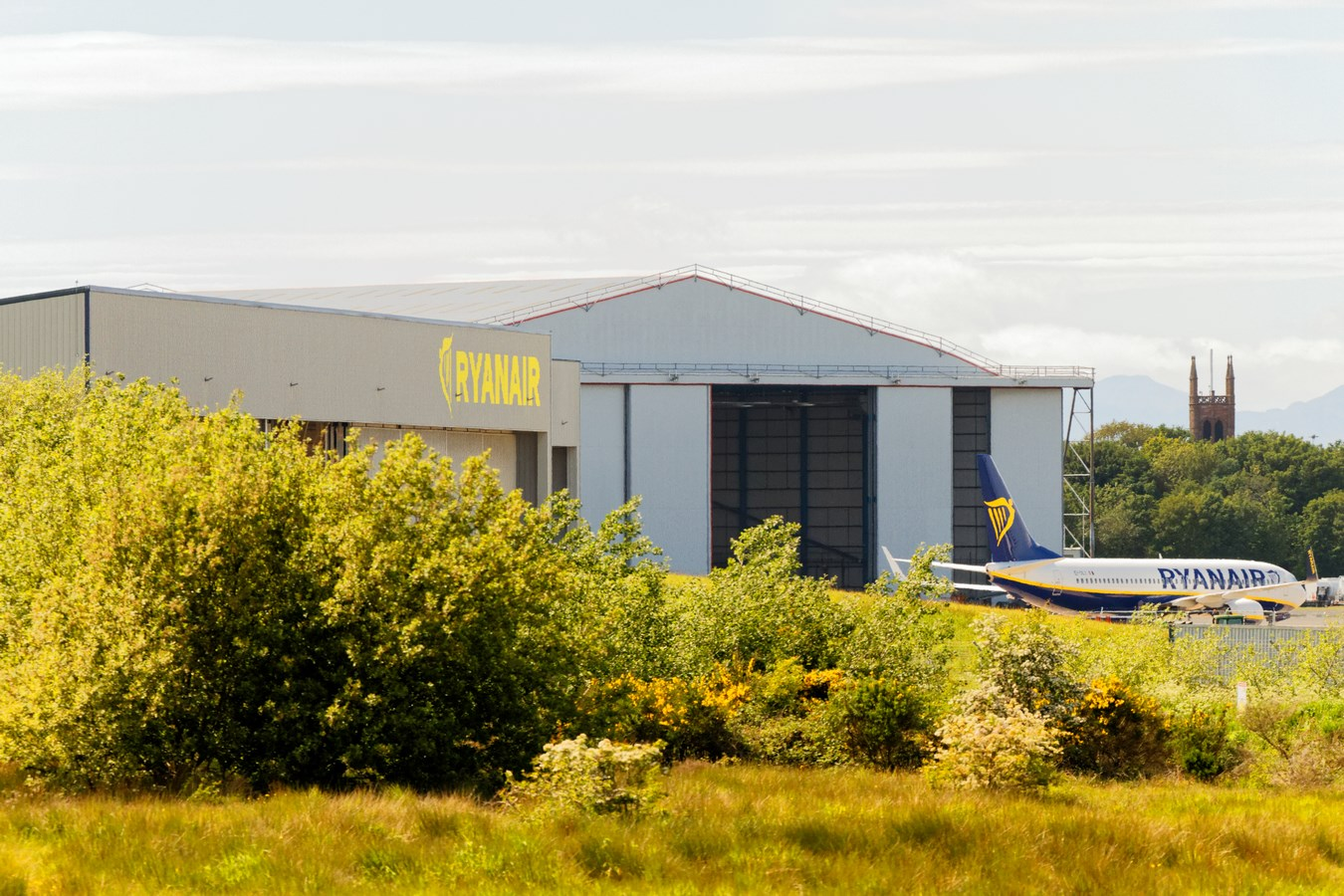
Aircraft maintenance hangar of Ryanair at Glasgow Prestwick Airport

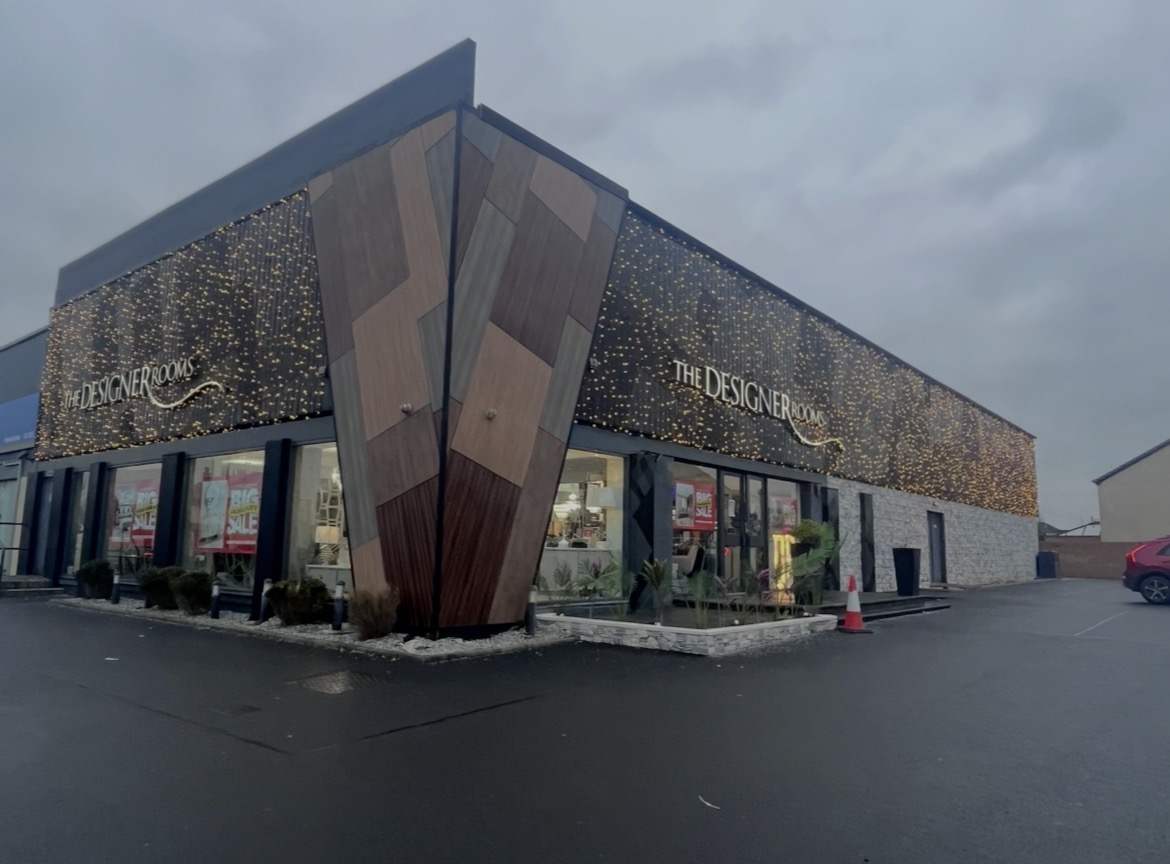
Home furnishings company The Designer Rooms was founded in Ayr in 2010

The north side of Ayr Harbour still operates as a commercial port, mainly exporting coal, and extensive railway sidings still lead down from the main railway line near Newton-on-Ayr station.

Ayr developed as the central retail hub in the south-west of Scotland after the opening of the town's first department store, Hourstons, in 1896. In the 1970s the opening of stores such as Marks and Spencers and Ayr's first shopping centre, the Kyle Centre (1988), encouraged an expansion in the local economy. The Kyle Centre closed to the public in 2020 and subsequently remained vacant."Orange Order chief buys abandoned Scots shopping centre for double asking price". The Scottish Sun.Heathfield Retail park, an out-of-town retail park, opened in 1993 with shops such as Halfords and Homebase. Ayr Central Shopping Centre opened in March 2006, housing shops such as Debenhams and H&M and under-parking for 500 cars. In December 2014 Threesixty Architecture received planning permission to refurbish the Kyle Centre by reinventing it as a centre of leisure through the creation of a new cinema complex among other new features. As of 2014 Royal Society for Public Health found Ayr's High Street to be the second healthiest in the United Kingdom behind Shrewsbury, a measure which reflects the presence of health-promoting infrastructure such as health services, community spaces and libraries, although by 2018 it was no longer in the top ten. In 2016 research conducted by the Local Data Company suggested that Ayr had among the highest number of shops per head in the United Kingdom at one shop for every 270 people.

During the 19th and 20th centuries, Ayr became a popular holiday resort. This was due to its fine sandy beach and the construction of the rail link to Glasgow which was completed in 1840.

To the north of Ayr is the adjoining town of Prestwick, which is known for its golf and aviation industries thanks to the presence of Glasgow Prestwick Airport. The airport is one of the main operational bases and focus city for budget airline Ryanair, with the airline having an aircraft maintenance hangar at the airport. The airport itself has become a Scottish hub for maintenance, repair and overhaul of aircraft, with key companies operating from bases at the airport including GE Caledonian, Spirit AeroSystems, Collins Aerospace, Ryanair (Prestwick Aircraft Maintenance), BAE Systems, Woodward Aircraft Engine Systems and Chevron Technical Services. Prestwick Spaceport launched a bid in partnership with South Ayrshire Council to become a spaceport focusing on small satellite launches, microgravity experiments and crewed missions for human spaceflight. It received funding via the Ayrshire Growth Deal of £80 million, with an additional £18 million from the UK Government and £5 million from the Scottish Government. The spaceport will support carrying small satellites into orbit via horizontal launch, or "air launch", using aircraft that fly out over the Atlantic Ocean.

Only 5 miles (8 km) north of Ayr is Troon, a golf and seaside resort which regularly hosts the Open Championship. Ayr has three golf courses in Bellisle, Seafield and Dalmilling, as well as a private course called St Cuthberts. The area is also known as a seaside resort, with the south of the town housing the Craig Tara and Haven (formerly Butlins) holiday parks. The suburban village of Alloway to the south of the town is also well established for its associations with the poet Robert Burns. Further south, the fishing village of Dunure takes in a ruined castle which was formerly owned by the Kennedy family.

In 1973, Ayr hosted the Royal National Mòd. Ayr has hosted the Scottish Grand National horse-racing steeplechase annually since 1966 and the Scottish International Airshow since 2014.

=== Religion ===
The 2022 Scottish Census found that 51% of the population of Ayr stated they had no religion. 28% stated they belonged to the Church of Scotland, 9% the Roman Catholic Church, 4% other Christian denominations and 2% other religions. 6% didn't respond to this optional question. Of the Christian denominations present in Ayr the Church of Scotland is largest with nine churches spread throughout the town, including the Auld Kirk of Ayr. The Roman Catholic Church has two churches, St Paul's, Belmont and the Cathedral Church of St Margaret the successor to The Good Shepherd Cathedral which has been demolished. The Scottish Episcopal Church is represented by the very substantial Holy Trinity Church in Fullarton Street in the town centre. There is also a Free Church of Scotland, a Baptist Church and Evangelical church in John Street, a Latter-Day Saints Church at Orchard Avenue and the Southside Christian Fellowship in Ayr Town Hall.

=== Education ===
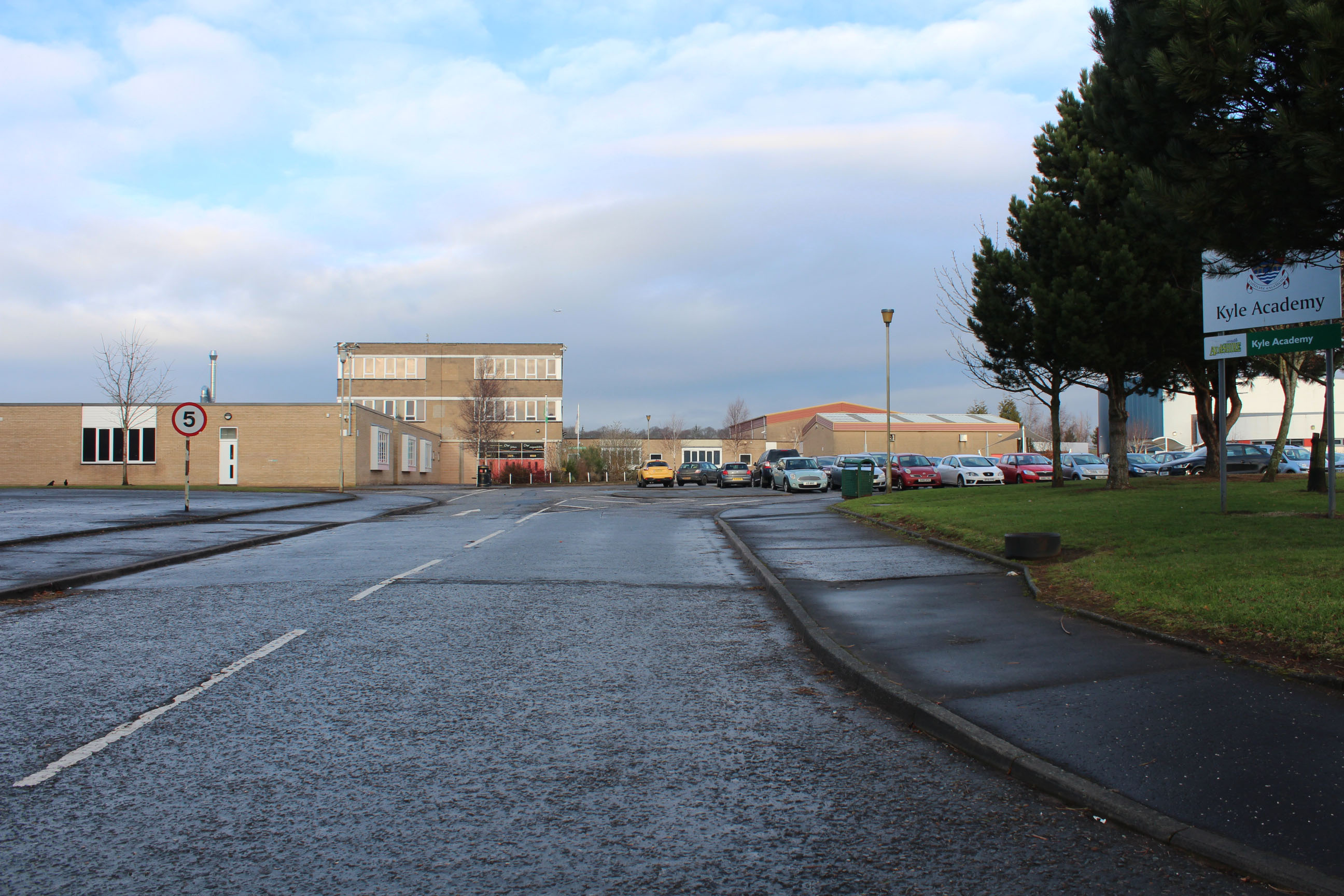
Kyle Academy opened to pupils in 1979 and serves pupils in the south–east of the town

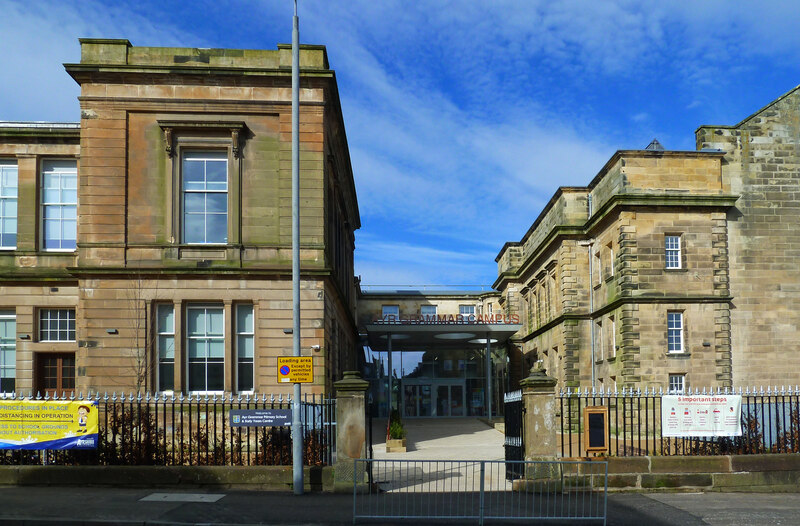
Ayr Grammar Primary School and Early Years Centre

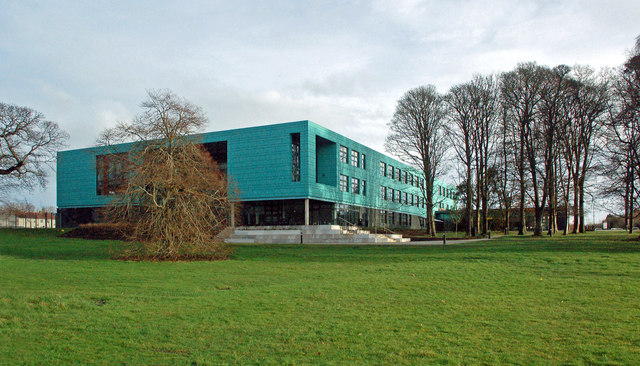
The new building of Ayr Academy at University Avenue which opened in August 2017

Ayr has two nursery schools:

- Cherry Tree Early Years Centre
- Wallacetown Early Years Centre

There are also several partnership centres and nursery classes held within primary schools within Ayr.

Ayr is served by sixteen primary schools:

- Alloway Primary School
- Annbank Primary School
- Braehead Primary School
- Dalmilling Primary School
- Doonfoot Primary School
- Forehill Primary School
- Grammar Primary School
- Heathfield Primary School
- Holmston Primary School
- Kincaidston Primary School
- Newton Primary School
- St. John's Primary School (denominational)
- Tarbolton Primary School

Ayr has one school which provides education for those with special educational needs:

- Southcraig Campus

Ayr is served by four secondary schools:

- Ayr Academy
- Belmont Academy
- Kyle Academy
- Queen Margaret Academy (denominational)

Prestwick Academy is located within the neighbouring town of Prestwick and provides education to pupils who are resident within Ayr but fall within its catchment area. Mainholm Academy was a former secondary school located within Ayr and was closed due to safety concerns.

Ayr is served by one independent school that provides both primary and secondary education:

- Wellington School

Ayr has four further education establishments:

- Ayrshire College (previously known as Ayr College and prior to that, Ayr Technical College)
- University of the West of Scotland (formerly known as the University of Paisley)
- Scotland's Rural College
- Adult Learning Centre

=== Public services and transport ===
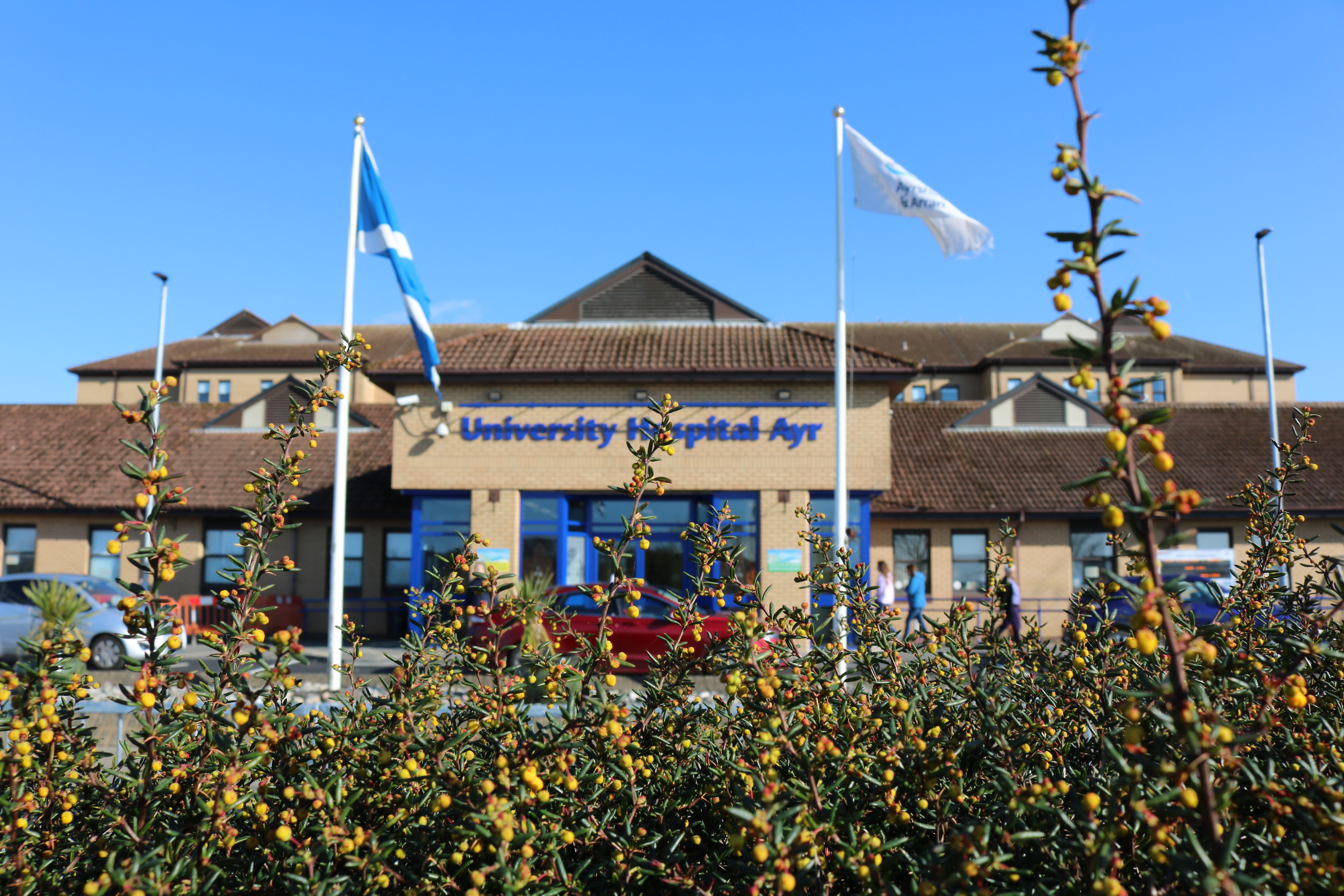
Entrance to University Hospital Ayr, the main general hospital in Ayr

The NHS Ayrshire and Arran Health Board serves South, East and North Ayrshire – a part of Ayrshire and Arran's departmental headquarters is located in Ayr. Ayr is also the regional headquarters of the Scottish Ambulance Service for south-west Scotland that is located in Heathfield, next to the site of the old Heathfield Hospital. Ayr previously had four hospitals: Heathfield Hospital (originally a fever hospital, but latterly medical and ophthalmic), Seafield Children's Hospital (a pediatric hospital), Ayr County Hospital (originally a voluntary hospital, and latterly confined to surgery) and Ailsa Hospital (a psychiatric hospital). University Hospital Ayr, completed in 1991, replaced all but Ailsa Hospital which is still open.

Currently, three hospitals lie adjacent to Ayr running along the A713 towards Hollybush in East Ayrshire, these are:

- University Hospital Ayr (general hospital with accident and emergency)
- Ailsa Hospital (mental health hospital)
- The Abbey Carrick Glen Hospital (private hospital)

Hollybush House on the outskirts of Ayr is used by a charity for the mental health welfare of ex-members of the UK Armed Forces. Ayr has two community centres; Heathfield Community Centre and Lochside Community Centre.

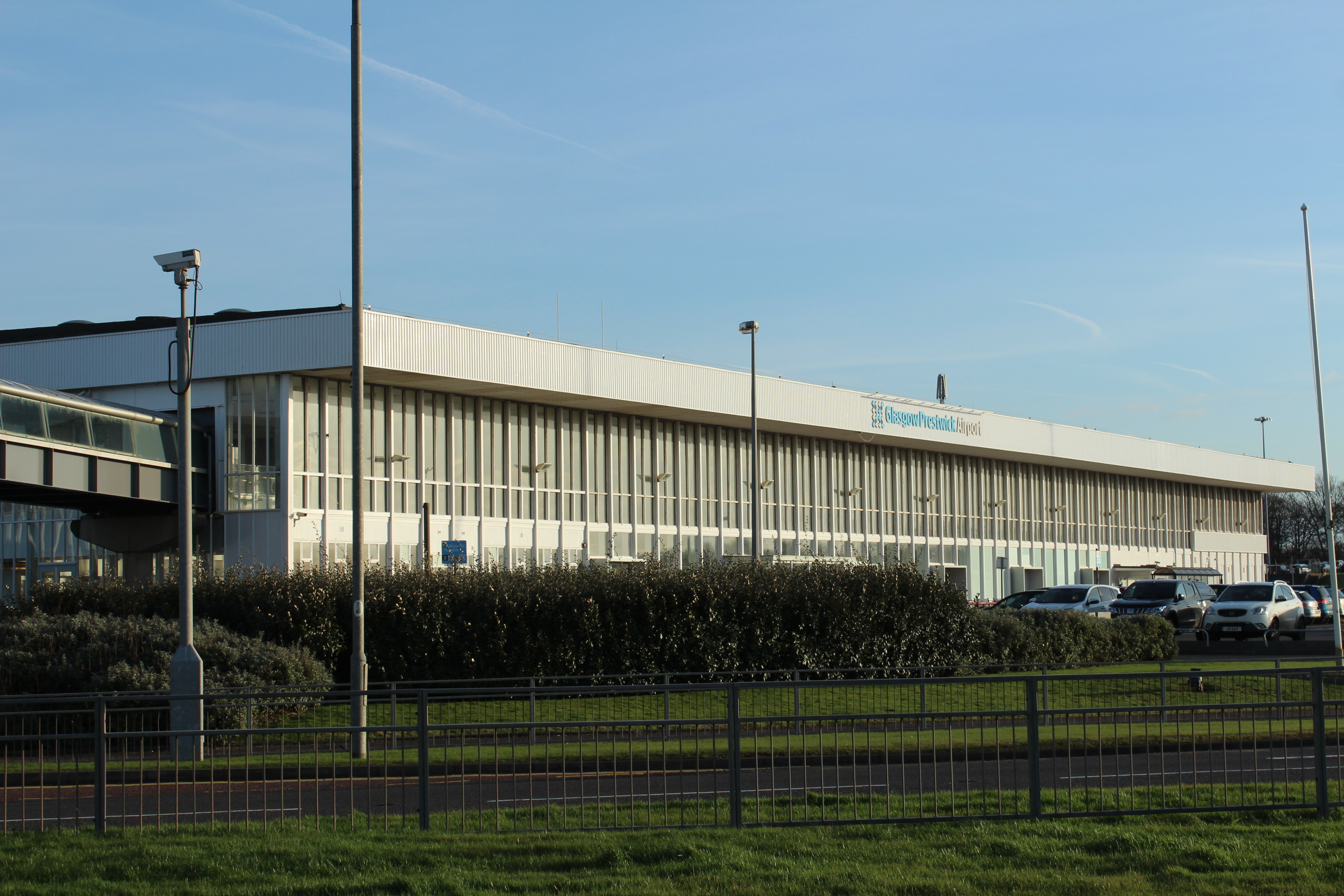
Prestwick Airport serves the town and Ayrshire, and is located in nearby Prestwick

Ayr is served by several major roads:

- A77 – forming the Ayr bypass, part of the trunk route between Glasgow and Stranraer. The bypass was built in 1971.
- A79 – the former A77 before the bypass was opened, now the main road running through Ayr and linking Ayr with Prestwick and its airport.
- A70 – running east from Ayr to Cumnock, Lanark and Edinburgh.
- A713 – running southeast to Dalmellington and Castle Douglas.
- A719 – running northeast to Galston and southwest along the coast to Turnberry.

Seven local bus services operated by Stagecoach South Scotland serve Ayr and Prestwick. Express coaches to Glasgow Buchanan Street operate every 10–60 minutes. Ulsterbus operate bus services to Belfast via Stranraer Ferry service on Stena Line. The Ayr railway station has regular services to Glasgow Central station, Stranraer, Girvan and Kilmarnock. All services are operated by ScotRail.

Scotrail provides a once per day bus connection to the Stena Port at Cairnryan for the ferry to Belfast. The town is served by the Glasgow Prestwick International Airport just 2 miles (3 km) north from Ayr, which offers regional and domestic air services across Europe and the British Isles. Further destinations are available from Glasgow Airport, which is accessible by train to Paisley Gilmour Street for the connecting bus to the airport. In relation to Ayr, Glasgow Airport is 35 miles (56 km) away.

Although the town does not have any ferry services from its harbour, it is in close proximity to ferry services to Northern Ireland. Cairnryan, 60 miles (100 km) south of Ayr, has up to eight daily departures to Belfast and up to seven daily departures to Larne.

== Culture ==
=== Sport ===
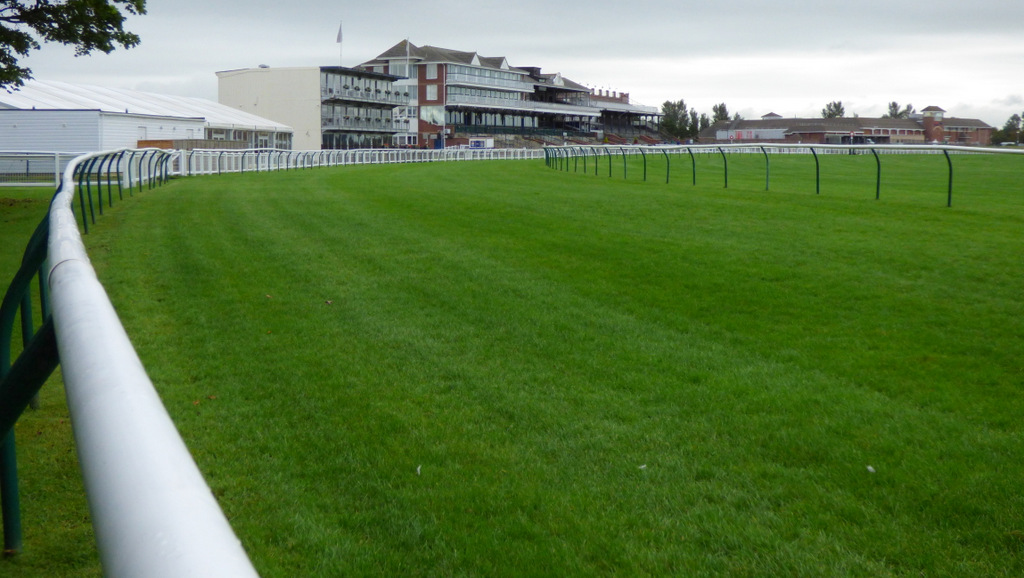
Ayr Racecourse opened in 1907, and is home to the annual Scottish Grand National.

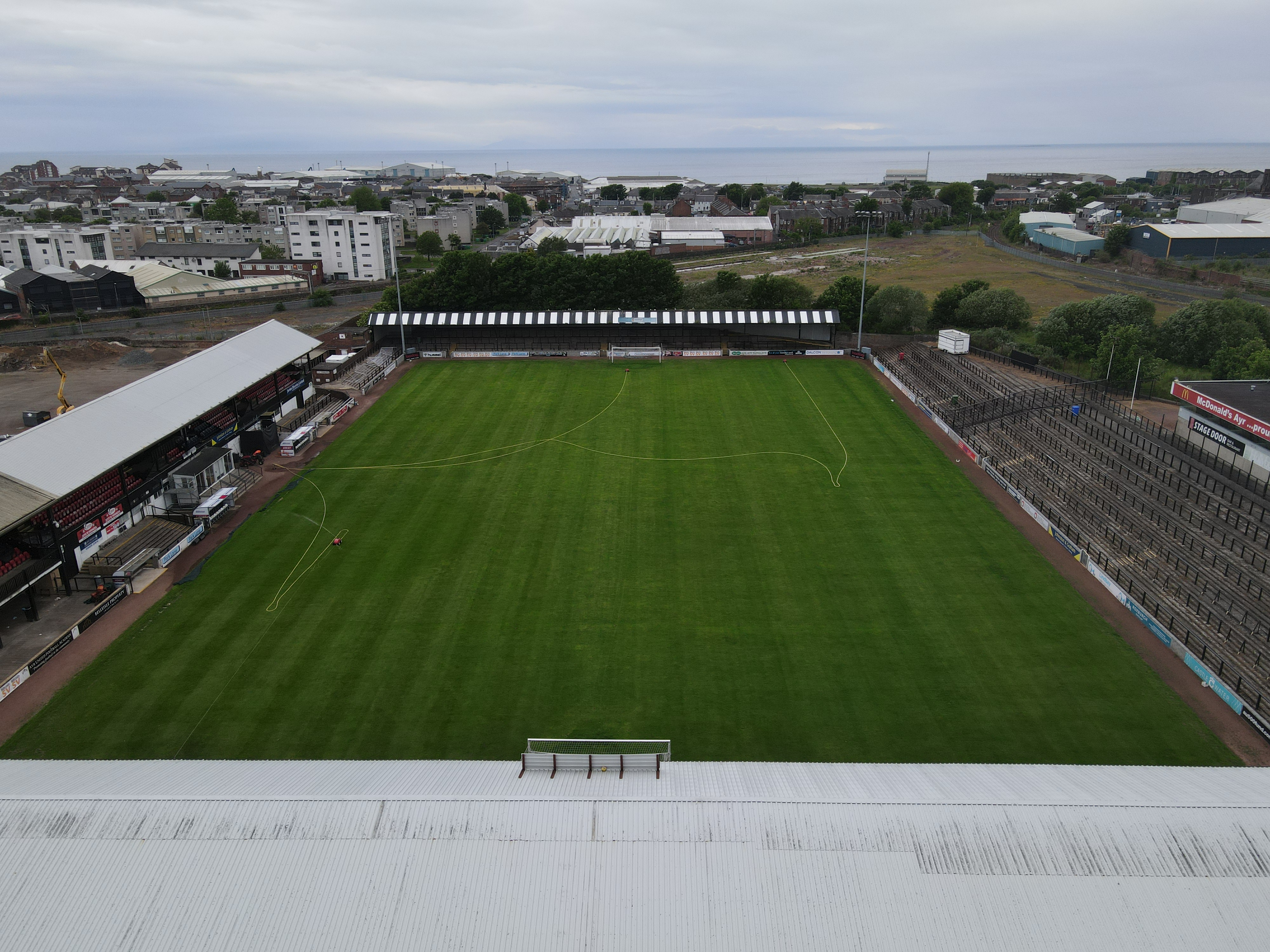
Ayr United F.C. play home matches at Somerset Park in the town

Ayr Racecourse is a well-known racecourse in Scotland and hosts both National Hunt and flat racing. It has the largest capacity in Scotland for horse racing. Notable events include the Scottish Grand National (April) and Ayr Gold Cup (September) as well as several night meetings. It was recently put up for sale by the owners and included the Western House Hotel as part of the potential sale.

Ayr has two senior football clubs. Ayr United play at Somerset Park in the Scottish Championship. They reached the final of the 2001–02 Scottish League Cup competition. The club was formed in 1910 with the merger of Ayr F.C. (who were formed in 1879 by the merger of Ayr Thistle and Ayr Academical football clubs) and Ayr Parkhouse F.C. Whitletts Victoria are based in the Whitletts area of Ayr and compete in the West of Scotland Football League.

The town has a strong history of ice hockey, but no longer hosts a professional ice hockey team. The most recent professional team were the Ayr Scottish Eagles who played in the British Superleague between 1996 and 2002 based at the Centrum arena. Ayr's rugby union team, Ayr RFC, play at Millbrae and are reigning Scottish Cup Champions and Scottish Premiership Champions 2012/2013, and won the 2008/09 Scottish Hydro Premiership. Ayr RFC has twice competed in the British and Irish cup involving clubs from Scotland, England, Wales and Ireland. A rugby league team, Ayr Knights ARLFC, play at Auchincruive.

Ayr Curling Club play at the curling rink in Limekiln Road and Ayr's cricket team plays in Cambusdoon. The town's leisure centre, Citadel Leisure Centre opened in 1997 at the mouth of the River Ayr and at the seafront at the South Harbour area. Its facilities include a main hall measuring 34 m × 27 m (112 ft × 89 ft), accommodating various sports including 5-a-side football, basketball, volleyball, netball, indoor hockey, indoor cricket practice, badminton and short tennis. As well as individual sports, sporting events and competitions, the hall has hosted exhibitions, concerts, trade fairs, election counts and awards ceremonies. The Citadel Leisure Centre is home to South Ayrshire Volleyball Club as well as being the town's only public swimming pool and diving pool. The Troon Tornadoes play their national league matches at the Citadel, despite not being an Ayr team. Additionally, Ayr has a Strathclyde league basketball team, Ayr Storm.

Speedway was staged at Dam Park in 1937, when two meetings, organised by Maurice and Roland Stobbart from Cumbria took place, featuring riders who raced in the north of England, at venues such as Workington and Hyde Road in Manchester. Ayr has a sandy beach with an esplanade. This is popular with joggers and day-trippers. Whitletts Activity Centre also serves the town of Ayr. It has an 11-a side outdoor soccer pitch and an indoor 5-a-side football pitch. Near Whitletts Activity Centre there is also a 5-a-side football complex called "Pro Soccer".

=== Arts and media ===
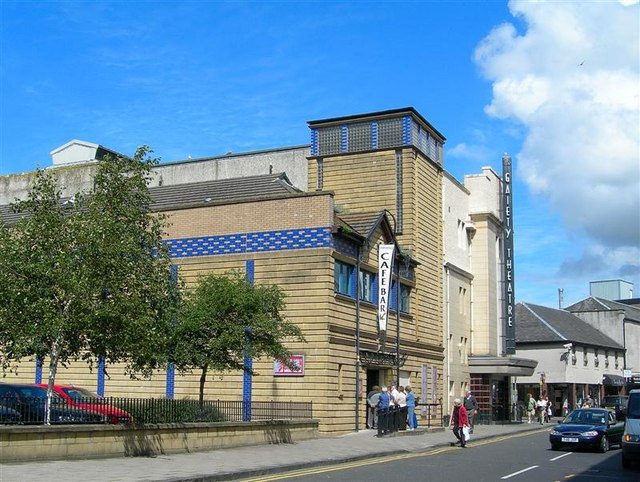
The Gaiety Theatre

Ayr is home to the Gaiety Theatre, built in 1902. The theatre was reconstructed following a fire in 1904, with its façade remodelled in 1935, and further reinstated after a fire in 1955. In 1995, an annexe was constructed, including a new café, box office, dressing rooms and studio space. After a faltering start, which saw several years as a cinema after World War I, the theatre was bought by Ben Popplewell, from Bradford, who already had a track record of success running the Pavilion theatre on Ayr seafront. For fifty years the Popplewell family ran the theatre – latterly as part of the Glasgow Pavilion business.

The radio station West FM was based in Ayr until mid-2017 and broadcasts on 96.7FM. West FM is the main broadcaster in the Ayrshire area. The Ayrshire Post, serving all parts of Ayrshire, and Ayr Advertiser, serving the towns of Ayr and Prestwick, newspapers are also based in Ayr. The Ayr Advertiser is Scotland's oldest weekly newspaper. West FM's move from Ayr marks the first time in 35 years that local radio has not been broadcast from Ayrshire.

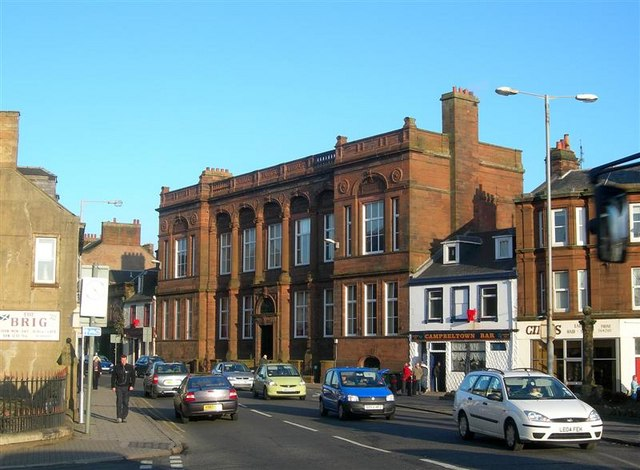
Carnegie Library, the main library in Ayr

Ayr is served by three libraries plus a mobile library. These are:

- Alloway Library (attached to Alloway Primary school)
- Carnegie Library (main library)
- Forehill Library

=== Twin towns ===
Ayr is twinned with:

- Saint-Germain-en-Laye, France since 1984.

=== In popular culture ===
The Barns of Ayr features in the 1810 historical novel The Scottish Chiefs by Jane Porter.

=== Freedom of the Burgh ===
The following people and military units have received the Freedom of the Burgh of Ayr.

- Sir Winston Churchill: 1947.
- The Royal Scots Fusiliers: 15 June 1946.

== Notable people ==
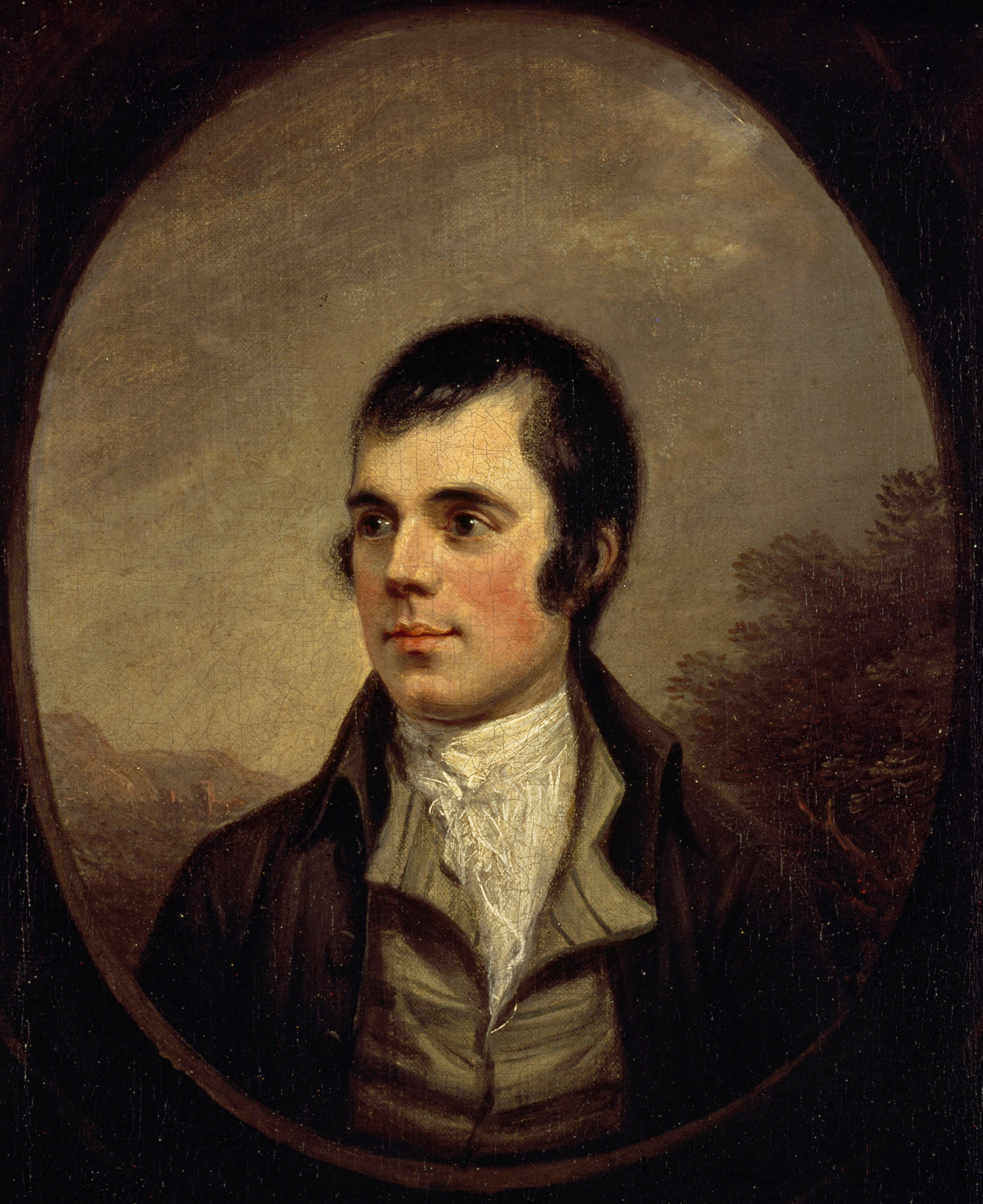
Robert Burns, Scotland's national poet, was born in the Alloway area of Ayr.

- Alex Bell (1882–1934), footballer
- Samuel Aitken (1878–1930), footballer
- Shaykh Abdalqadir as-Sufi (1930–2021), born Ian Dallas, Shaykh of Instruction, Islamic leader, author, actor
- William D. Brackenridge (1810–1893), botanist
- Robert Burns, (1759–1796), Scotland's national bard, poet and writer of songs; born in Alloway
- William Dalrymple (1723–1814), minister and moderator
- Noam Dar (born 1993), professional wrestler
- Sydney Devine (1940–2021), singer
- James Morris Gale (1830–1903), civil engineer for Glasgow Corporation Waterworks
- Thomas Garvine (1690–1766), physician, traveller to Russia and China, provost of Ayr.
- Gavin Gordon (1901–1970), composer and singer
- William Schaw Lindsay (1815–1877), British merchant, shipowner, Member of Parliament, military theorist
- John Loudon McAdam (1756–1836), inventor of Tarmacadam road surface
- Sam McCrory (born 1965), former member of Ulster Defence Association, gay activist
- Drew McIntyre (born 1985), professional wrestler, first person born in the UK to become the WWE Champion
- Alan McInally (born 1963), footballer, TV pundit
- Thomas McIlwraith (1835–1900), Premier of Queensland, Australia
- Ann McManus (1957–2025), screenwriter for Waterloo Road and other television series
- Ewan McVicar (born 1994), DJ
- William Maclure (1763–1840), geologist, drew 1st geological map of U.S., president of American Geological Society
- Alexander Mathie-Morton (1880–1965), cricketer
- Stuart Murdoch (born 1968), singer-songwriter, Belle & Sebastian
- Sir David Murray (born 1951), Rangers F.C. chairman
- Simon Alexander Neil (born 1979), Lead vocalist, guitarist, songwriter for Biffy Clyro
- Neil Oliver (born 1967), BBC presenter of Coast and A History of Scotland
- Alan Reid (born 1954), MP for Liberal Democrats
- Dominic Rigby (born 1970), cricketer
- Mike Scott (born 1958), lead Singer/Songwriter of The Waterboys
- Robert Shankland (1887–1968), awarded Victoria Cross for his actions at Battle of Passchendaele 1917
- Ronald Stevenson (1938–1999), first-class cricketer
- Sheila Walsh (born 1956), Christian singer and talk-show host

== See also ==
- Auchincruive Waggonway
- Craigie Waggonway
- Newton Loch, South Ayrshire – The Newton or Malt Mill and Newton Loch
- Wallace's Heel Well – A spring running from the imprint in rock of William Wallace's heel.
