= Ayrshire Post =

Scottish newspaper

- Type: Weekly newspaper
- Owner: Reach plc
- Editor: Ross Dunn
- Founded: 1880
- Headquarters: Ayr, Scotland
- Circulation: 4,059 (as of 2023)
- Website: www.dailyrecord.co.uk/authors/ayrshire-post/

The Ayrshire Post is a weekly Scottish local newspaper serving the communities of South Ayrshire and parts of East Ayrshire with local news, issues and sports coverage. The Ayrshire Post primarily serves the towns of Ayr, Prestwick, Troon, Cumnock, Maybole, Girvan and their surrounding communities.

In 2013, it "joined forces" with the Daily Record, and subsequently its website was subsumed into that of the Daily Record.

The Ayrshire Post was founded in 1880 as a voice of Liberalism, in direct competition to existing Tory rival the Ayr Advertiser and the now defunct Ayr Observer and the more radical Ayrshire Express. The Post was edited by John Fergus Macnair from 1925 to 1958, and the chief reporter was Allan Hewitson from 1946 to 1961, who also founded the Ayr branch of the National Union of Journalists. There was hot rivalry between the Advertiser and the Post. The Advertiser came out on Thursday, and if it had a good story, the Post, which came out on Friday could follow it up. Another source of news was The Daily Telegraph and The Times, with any local event being followed up. The Post did not devote as much space to agricultural matters as did the ''Advertiser. After World War II the circulation of the Advertiser was 14,000, while that of the Post was 20,000.

The title was judged Scottish Weekly Newspaper of the Year in 2014 at the Scottish Press Awards. It was the first time an Ayrshire newspaper has won the award.

The Ayrshire Post won Weekly Newspaper of the Year at the 43rd Scottish Press Awards held in September 2022.

There separate editions for Troon and the district of Carrick, which includes communities centred around Maybole and Girvan.

The newspaper is owned by Reach plc and is the biggest selling weekly title within the Media Scotland stable. As of 2012, it had a circulation of 20,000, approximately the same as in 1939 and a 10% decline from 2011's circulation of 23,493.
