= Dominic Rigby =

Scottish cricketer and administrator

Personal information
- Full name: Dominic Anthony John Rigby
- Born: 17 November 1970 (age 55); Ayr, Ayrshire, Scotland
- Batting: Right-handed

Domestic team information
- Years: Team
- 2002–2003: Scotland

Career statistics
Competition	List A
Matches	2
Runs scored	19
Batting average	19.00
100s/50s	–/–
Top score	15*
Catches/stumpings	1/–
- Source: Cricinfo, 20 June 2022

Dominic Anthony John Rigby (born 17 November 1970) is a Scottish former cricketer and administrator.

Rigby was born at Ayr in November 1970. He initially played club cricket in Scotland for Prestwick Cricket Club, he was a member of Scotland's fifteen man squad which toured Zimbabwe in 1994, where he played minor matches against Zimbabwean provincial sides. Rigby later played two List A one-day matches for Scotland against the Lancashire Cricket Board at Aberdeen in the 2nd round of the 2003 Cheltenham & Gloucester Trophy (played in 2002) and Somerset at Edinburgh in the 3rd round of the same competition (played in 2003). He scored 19 runs in these matches, with a highest score of 15 not out against the Lancashire Cricket Board. Rigby later played club cricket in Ireland for Clontarf Cricket Club until 2013.
