= Auld Kirk of Ayr =

Coordinates: 55°27′46″N 4°37′43″W

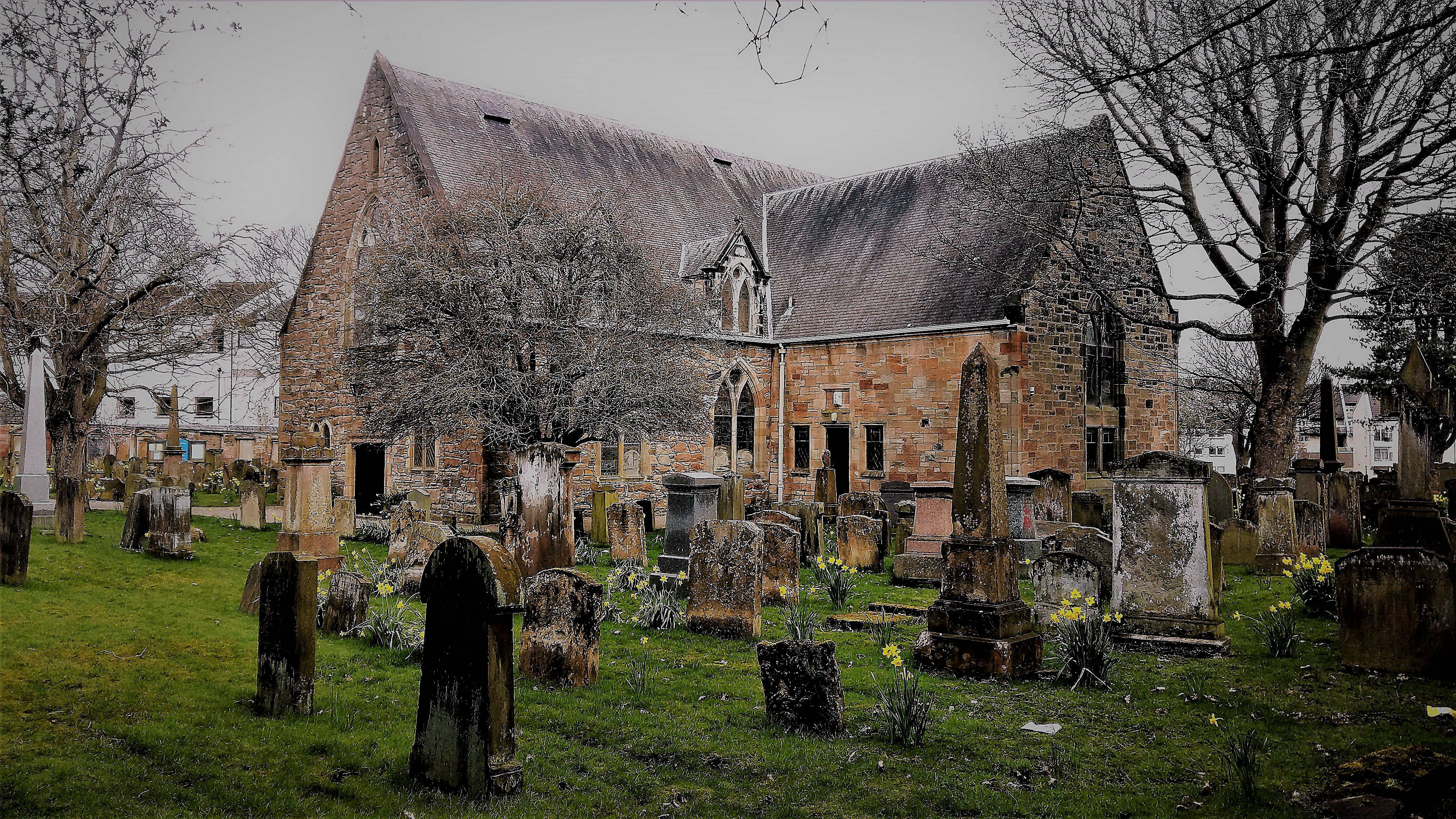
The Auld Kirk of Ayr

Auld Kirk of Ayr is a 17th-century Category A listed church in Ayr. The church sits on the site of an earlier monastery.

== History ==
The site of the church has been in religious use since the 15th century. The church was built on the site of a former Franciscan Order monastery, chapel and gardens that were in use from 1474 until 1560, when the English Francicans were disbanded during the Reformation.

In 1652, Oliver Cromwell's forces built a new citadel (fortress) in Ayr, requiring the demolition of the medieval St John's Church (the tower was kept and remains today). A new church was therefore needed for Ayr, and funding of 1,000 merks was arranged by Colonel Alured, which resulted in the completion of the Auld Kirk of Ayr in 1654 to designs of local architect Theophilius Rankeine. The church was originally a T-plan church but is now cruciform in shape following changes in 1836 by architect David Bryce and further alteraions to the design of the church in 1933.

On January 26, 1759, the day after he was born, Robert Burns was baptised in the church by the minister William Dalrymple.

== Interior ==
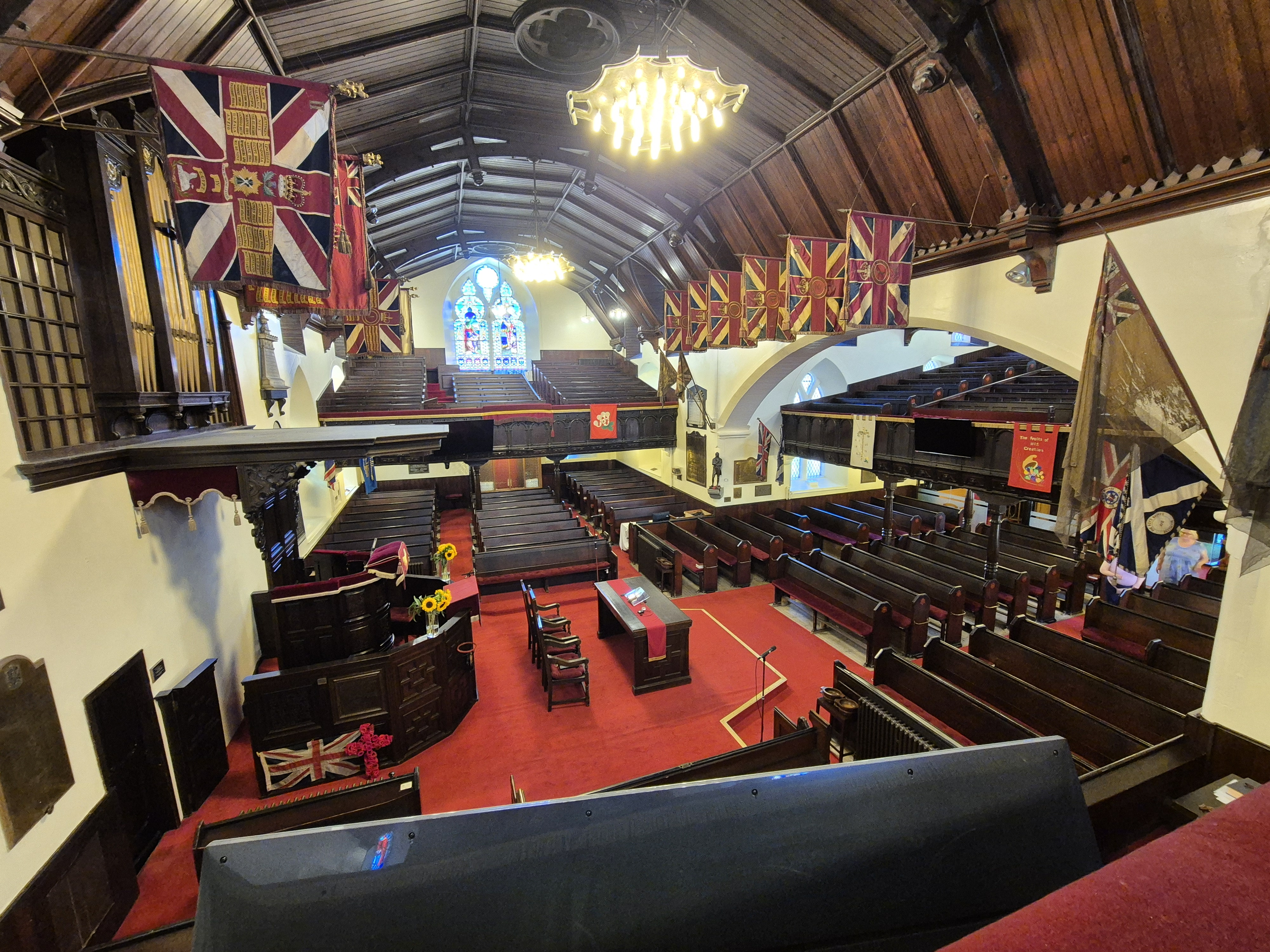
Interior of the church viewed from the sailor's loft

The church contains an unusual double-tier paneled pulpit and rows of wooden pews. There are numerous leaded stained glass windows. There are three first-floor wooden galleries: the trades' gallery, the merchant's gallery, and the sailor's gallery.

There is an 18th-century benefaction board in the church. In the sailor's gallery, a model of the ship Arethusa hangs from the ceiling.

== Grounds ==
The burial ground and cemetery boundary walls are Category B listed.

There is a 17th-century lychgate that provides access from the high street via Kirk Port, and it is dated 1656.
