= Ayr Advertiser =

- Type: Weekly newspaper
- Owner: Newsquest
- Founded: 1803; 222 years ago
- Language: English
- City: Ardrossan
- Country: United Kingdom
- Circulation: 543 (as of 2023)
- Website: ayradvertiser.com

The Ayr Advertiser is a weekly Scottish local newspaper, serving the community of South Ayrshire with local news, issues and sports coverage. The Ayr Advertiser was founded in 1803, originally entitled the "Air Advertiser, or, West Country Journal", and claims to be the oldest weekly newspaper in Scotland.

The paper is part of the Ayr Advertiser Series, which incorporates the Troon and Prestwick Times and the Carrick Herald. It is produced as part of the Ayrshire Weekly Press (AWP) group, with sister papers including the Ardrossan and Saltcoats Herald, the Irvine Times, Largs and Millport News and the Cumnock Chronicle. The owners of the AWP were Clyde and Forth Press, who owned titles across the UK. The company went into receivership after the death of Deirdre Romanes and were acquired by management and Lloyds Bank under the name Romanes Media in 2012. Newsquest acquired Romanes Media in 2015.

Historical copies of the Ayr Advertiser, dating back to 1839, are available to search and view in digitised form at The British Newspaper Archive.

In October 2020, during the worldwide COVID-19 pandemic, the Ayr Advertiser ran a story about the diagnosis of US President Donald Trump with COVID-19 under the headline "Turnberry hotelier tests positive for coronavirus", in reference to his ownership of the Trump Turnberry golf course.
