= 2012 North Ayrshire Council election =

North Ayrshire Council election

← 2007	3 May 2012	2017 →

All 30 seats to North Ayrshire Council 16 seats needed for a majority
	First party	Second party	Third party
	SNP	Lab	Ind
Leader	William Gibson	David O'Neill	Jean Highgate
Party	SNP	Labour	Independent
Leader's seat	Saltcoats and Stevenston	Irvine West	Kilbirnie and Beith
Last election	8 seats, 26.7%	12 seats, 40.0%	5 seats, 16.7%
Seats before	8	12	6
Seats won	12	11	6
Seat change	▲4	▼1	▲1
Popular vote	14,623	12,906	7,808
Percentage	35.6%	31.4%	19.0%
Swing	▲6.1	▼1.0	▲2.1
Council Leader before election
David O'Neill
(Labour)
No overall control
Council Leader after election
William Gibson
(SNP)
No overall control

The 2012 North Ayrshire Council election took place on 3 May 2012 to elect members of North Ayrshire Council. The election used the eight wards created as a result of the Local Governance (Scotland) Act 2004, with each ward electing three or four councillors using the single transferable vote system form of proportional representation, with 30 Councillors being elected.

The election saw the Scottish National Party make further advances by gaining four seats to become the largest party on the Council while also increasing their vote share significantly. Labour lost one seat to become the second-largest party on the Council. Independents gained a seat to have a total of six members. The Conservatives lost two-thirds of their former seats, while the Liberal Democrats were wiped out, losing both their seats.

Following the election, the SNP formed a minority administration on the Council. This replaced the previous Labour minority administration which existed from 2007 to 2012. This was also the first time Labour had not been part of the administration on the council for over 30 years.

== Election result ==
2012 North Ayrshire Council election result
Party	Seats	Gains	Losses	Net gain/loss	Seats %	Votes %	Votes	+/−
SNP	12	4	0	▲4	40.0	35.6	14,623	▲6.1
Labour	11	0	1	▼1	36.7	31.4	12,906	▼1.0
Independent	6	2	1	▲1	20.0	19.0	7,808	▲2.1
Conservative	1	0	2	▼2	3.3	9.3	3,834	▼4.1
Liberal Democrats	0	0	2	▼2	0.0	1.6	655	▼5.1
Socialist Labour	0	0	0	Steady	0.0	1.1	443	▲0.6
Scottish Socialist	0	0	0	Steady	0.0	0.9	378	▲0.4
UKIP	0	0	0	Steady	0.0	0.5	221	New
Scottish Senior Citizens	0	0	0	Steady	0.0	0.4	163	New
TUSC	0	0	0	Steady	0.0	0.1	51	New
Total	30						41,082	

Note: "Votes" are the first preference votes. The net gain/loss and percentage changes relate to the result of the previous Scottish local elections on 3 May 2007. This may differ from other published sources showing gain/loss relative to seats held at dissolution of Scotland's councils.

== Ward results ==
=== Irvine West ===
Labour (2) and the SNP (1) retained the seats they had won at the previous election while the SNP gained one seat from the Conservatives.

Irvine West - 4 seats
Party	Candidate	FPv%	Count								
Party	Candidate	FPv%	1	2	3	4	5	6	7	8	9
SNP	Matthew Brown (incumbent)	31.6	1,624								
Labour	Ian Clarkson (incumbent)	26.8	1,374								
Labour	David O'Neill (incumbent)	13.5	691	720	950	958	995	1,039			
Conservative	Pat McPhee (incumbent)	12.0	614	634	652	653	657	682	683	773	
SNP	Ruth Maguire (Note: Irvine West SNP councillor Ruth Maguire was elected as a MSP for Cunninghame South at the 2016 Scottish Parliament election. She resigned her council seat on 25 May 2016 and a by-election was held on 11 August 2016 which was won by Labour's Louise McPhater.)	5.2	265	695	704	713	730	769	770	840	945
Liberal Democrats	Gordon Bain	4.8	246	272	283	289	300	330	331		
Independent	Derek Owen	3.6	187	197	202	216	231				
Socialist Labour	Bobby Cochrane	1.6	81	92	112	123					
TUSC	Ian Kerr	1.0	51	61	65						
Electorate: 14,793 Valid: 5,133 Spoilt: 157 Quota: 1,027 Turnout: 34.7%

=== Irvine East ===
Labour (2) and the SNP (1) retained the seats they had won at the previous election while the SNP gained one seat from the Liberal Democrats.

Irvine East - 4 seats
Party	Candidate	FPv%	Count									
Party	Candidate	FPv%	1	2	3	4	5	6	7	8	9	10
SNP	Joan Sturgeon (incumbent)	20.6	1,045									
SNP	Marie Burns	18.1	917	941	941	960	998	1,039				
Labour	Irene Oldfather	15.0	763	764	766	782	819	851	854	1,032		
Labour	John Easdale	12.7	643	643	645	652	673	697	700	874	886	1,098
Independent	Tom Barr (incumbent)	10.6	537	538	542	558	604	742	746	763	765	
Labour	David Logan	8.1	413	413	415	428	445	452	454			
Conservative	Chris Barr	7.4	377	377	377	377	409					
Liberal Democrats	Ruby Kirkwood (incumbent)	5.2	263	263	263	267						
Scottish Socialist	Denise Morton	1.7	89	89	98							
Socialist Labour	James McDaid	0.5	27	27								
Electorate: 14,994 Valid: 5,074 Spoilt: 116 Quota: 1,015 Turnout: 33.8%

=== Kilwinning ===
Labour (2) and the SNP (1) retained the seats they had won at the previous election while independent candidate Robert Steel gained a seat from the Liberal Democrats.

Kilwinning - 4 seats
Party	Candidate	FPv%	Count										
Party	Candidate	FPv%	1	2	3	4	5	6	7	8	9	10	11
SNP	John Ferguson (incumbent)	29.2	1,440										
Labour	Joe Cullinane	21.3	1,054										
Independent	Robert Steel	14.1	695	720	722	735	754	771	946	966	1,092		
Labour	Donald Reid	10.6	525	533	548	548	557	559	590	867	909	929	1,012
Conservative	Scott Gallacher	7.3	363	369	370	372	373	385	398	407			
Labour	Helen Hainey	5.6	279	295	335	337	341	352	373				
Independent	Colin Hedley	5.1	254	268	270	293	299	319					
SNP	Iain Walker	3.0	148	489	490	490	501	511	532	547	568	581	
Liberal Democrats	Stuart Gardiner	1.7	82	88	90	90	90						
Scottish Socialist	Andy Jones	1.1	54	60	61	63							
Independent	Philip Hogg	0.9	45	47	47								
Electorate: 13,087 Valid: 4,939 Spoilt: 157 Quota: 988 Turnout: 37.7%

=== Saltcoats and Stevenston ===
Labour (2), the SNP (1) and independent councillor Ronnie McNicol retained the seats they had won at the previous election.

Saltcoats and Stevenston - 4 seats
Party	Candidate	FPv%	Count							
Party	Candidate	FPv%	1	2	3	4	5	6	7	8
Labour	Jim Montgomerie	36.2	1,926							
SNP	Willie Gibson (incumbent)	23.4	1,244							
Independent	Ronnie McNicol (incumbent)	13.2	703	771	789	796	816	884	993	1,210
Labour	Alan Munro (incumbent)	10.1	540	1,124						
SNP	Nan Wallace	9.0	481	510	642	650	667	688	729	
Conservative	David Rocks	3.6	193	198	199	201	205			
Scottish Senior Citizens	Jimmy Miller	3.1	163	210	216	225	239	282		
Socialist Labour	Debbie Anderson	1.4	76	91	94	100				
Electorate: 15,274 Valid: 5,326 Spoilt: 138 Quota: 1,066 Turnout: 34.9%

=== Ardrossan and Arran ===
The SNP, Labour and independent councillor John Hunter retained the seats they had won at the previous election while the SNP gained one seat from former independent councillor Margie Currie.

Ardrossan and Arran - 4 seats
Party	Candidate	FPv%	Count							
Party	Candidate	FPv%	1	2	3	4	5	6	7	8
SNP	Tony Gurney (incumbent)	17.6	982	986	998	1,033	1,048	1,081	1,095	1,149
SNP	John Bruce	15.0	837	841	868	889	918	1,109	1,113	1,157
Independent	John Hunter (incumbent)	14.2	792	796	833	895	1,025	1,191		
Labour	Peter McNamara (incumbent)	12.9	721	730	738	770	812	871	881	1,414
Labour	Loretta Gardner	11.8	659	667	692	720	750	793	798	
Independent	Marc A. Head	10.5	588	595	609	620	714			
Conservative	David Tate	8.8	491	507	551	561				
Scottish Socialist	Campbell Martin	4.2	235	237	250					
UKIP	Gordon Niven Allison	3.9	221	227						
Liberal Democrats	Nick Smith	1.1	64							
Electorate: 13,674 Valid: 5,590 Spoilt: 106 Quota: 1,119 Turnout: 40.9%

=== Dalry and West Kilbride ===
Independent councillor Elizabeth McLardy retained the seat she had won at the previous election while the SNP and independent councillor Robert Barr each gained a seat from Labour and the Conservatives. In 2007, Cllr Barr had been elected as a Conservative candidate but later left the party.

Dalry and West Kilbride - 3 seats
Party	Candidate	FPv%	Count						
Party	Candidate	FPv%	1	2	3	4	5	6	7
Independent	Robert Barr (incumbent)	29.4	1,278						
SNP	Catherine McMillan	22.6	982	1,010	1,018	1,041	1,077	1,084	1,340
Independent	Elizabeth McLardy (incumbent)	19.6	853	884	899	929	1,117		
Labour	John Reid (incumbent)	16.0	697	729	737	765	810	815	
Conservative	Davina Saunders	9.8	425	447	450	450			
Socialist Labour	Louise McDaid	2.2	94	97	99				
Independent	John Willis	0.5	24	41					
Electorate: 9,513 Valid: 4,353 Spoilt: 47 Quota: 1,089 Turnout: 45.8%

=== Kilbirnie and Beith ===
The SNP, Labour and independent councillor Jean Highgate retained the seats they had won at the previous election.

Kilbirnie and Beith - 3 seats
Party	Candidate	FPv%	Count							
Party	Candidate	FPv%	1	2	3	4	5	6	7	8
SNP	Anthea Dickson (incumbent)	24.8	1,101	1,107	1,121					
Independent	Jean Highgate (incumbent)	17.1	758	767	804	804	910	947	1,000	1,368
SNP	Craig Wilson	17.1	762	763	771	778	807	853	886	
Labour	John Bell (incumbent)	17.0	756	765	773	773	785	1,370		
Labour	Allan Wilson	16.2	721	727	731	731	745			
Conservative	Ted Nevill	5.1	228	228	231	231				
Independent	Josh McCormick	1.7	77	81						
Socialist Labour	Tristan Lindsay	0.9	41							
Electorate: 10,662 Valid: 4,444 Spoilt: 97 Quota: 1,112 Turnout: 41.7%

=== North Coast and Cumbraes ===
The SNP (2), Labour (1) and the Conservatives (1) retained the seats they had won at the previous election.

North Coast and Cumbraes - 4 seats
Party	Candidate	FPv%	Count					
Party	Candidate	FPv%	1	2	3	4	5	6
SNP	Alan Hill (incumbent)	27.4	1,705					
Labour	Alex Gallagher (incumbent)	18.4	1,144	1,167	1,197	1,281		
Conservative	Tom Marshall	18.4	1,143	1,161	1,173	1,176	1,182	1,599
SNP	Alex McLean (Note: North Coast and Cumbraes SNP councillor Alex McLean died on 1 August 2014. A by-election was held on 30 October 2014 and was won by his widow Grace McLean, also of the SNP.)	17.5	1,090	1,441				
Independent	Ian Murdoch	16.3	1,017	1,050	1,103	1,126	1,137	
Socialist Labour	James Anderson	2.0	124	128	137			
Electorate: 13,226 Valid: 6,223 Spoilt: 97 Quota: 1,245 Turnout: 47.0%

== By-elections ==
=== 2014 North Coast and Cumbraes by-election ===
North Coast and Cumbraes by-election (30 October 2014) - 1 seat
Party	Candidate	FPv%	Count				
Party	Candidate	FPv%	1	2	3	4	5
SNP	Grace McLean	38.7	2,021	2,045	2,156	2,279	2,966
Independent	Drew Cochrane	22.8	1,190	1,234	1,411	2,000	
Conservative	Toni Dawson	21.5	1,125	1,174	1,296		
Labour	Valerie Reid	13.2	691	711			
UKIP	Meilan Henderson	3.6	192				
Electorate: 14,052 Valid: 5,219 Spoilt: 45 Quota: 2,610 Turnout: 37.5%

=== 2016 Irvine West by-election ===
Irvine West by-election (11 August 2016) - 1 Seat
Party	Candidate	FPv%	Count					
Party	Candidate	FPv%	1	2	3	4	5	6
SNP	Robin Sturgeon	37.5	1,164	1,168	1,207	1,226	1,277	
Labour	Louise McPhater	33.1	1,029	1,046	1,060	1,118	1,301	1,697
Conservative	Angela Stephen	20.6	639	650	655	658		
Socialist Labour	Bobby Cochrane	4.2	131	133	146			
Scottish Green	Josh McCormick	3.0	94	100				
Liberal Democrats	Nick Smith	1.5	48					
Electorate: 14,849 Valid: 3,105 Spoilt: 46 Quota: 1,553 Turnout: 20.9%
