= Joan Sturgeon =

Political activist and mother of Nicola Sturgeon

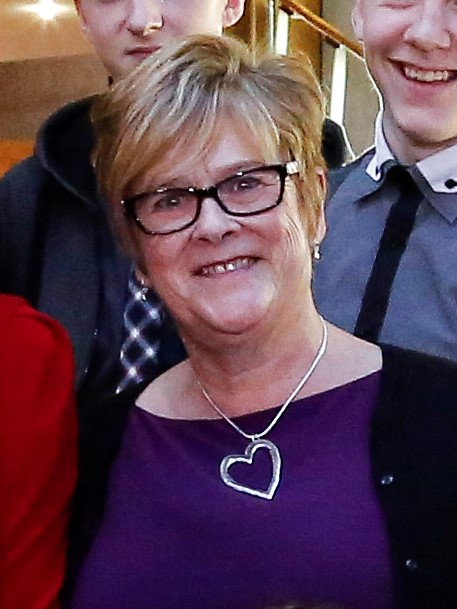
- Sturgeon in 2014

Provost of North Ayrshire
- In office 25 May 2012 – 17 August 2016
- Deputy: Robert Barr
- Preceded by: Pat McPhee
- Succeeded by: Ian Clarkson

Personal details
- Born: Joan Kerr Ferguson; 23 October 1952 (age 73) St Quivox, Ayrshire, Scotland
- Party: Scottish National Party
- Spouse: Robin Sturgeon (m. 1969)
- Children: Nicola; Gillian

Joan Kerr Sturgeon (née Ferguson; born 23 October 1952) is a Scottish politician and former dental nurse who served as the Provost of North Ayrshire from 2012 to 2016. She served on the North Ayrshire council from 2007 to 2017, representing the Irvine East ward. A member of the Scottish National Party (SNP), she is the mother of the party's former leader and former First Minister of Scotland, Nicola Sturgeon.

== Early life ==
Joan Kerr Ferguson was born on 23 October 1952 in St Quivox, Ayrshire.

Sturgeon married Robin Sturgeon in 1969. They have two daughters, Nicola and Gillian. The family grew up in Prestwick and later in the village of Dreghorn. Although not politically active at the time, Sturgeon was an SNP voter and was in-favour of Scottish devolution in both the 1979 and 1997 referendums.

She worked as a dental nurse.

== Political career ==
Sturgeon was elected to the North Ayrshire council in the 2007 Scottish local government elections. She sat on the council for ten years, representing the Irvine East ward.

=== Provost of North Ayrshire ===
Following Sturgeon's re-election in 2012, she was elected Provost of North Ayrshire after defeating Scottish Labour's Ian Clarkson. She succeeded Pat McPhee and became the third woman to hold the post after McPhee and Teresa Beattie, who was elected convener of the former Cunninghame District Council.

Ruth Maguire, the councillor for the Irvine West ward, stood down after she was elected to the Scottish Parliament in the 2016 election. As a result, a by-election was held and the SNP selected Sturgeon's husband, Robin, as the candidate. He was unsuccessful and was defeated by the Labour candidate, Louise McPhater. This gain for Labour made them the largest party in the council with one seat more than the SNP. On 17 August 2016, the SNP announced its decision to resign from the administration, stating "“given that the SNP group no longer command the largest representation on the council, it is only right that Labour be given the opportunity to form the next administration of the council". Sturgeon subsequently stood down as Provost.

Sturgeon stood down as a councillor at the 2017 Scottish local elections.
