= Irvine East (ward) =

Electoral ward in North Ayrshire

- North Ayrshire
- Boundary of Irvine East in North Ayrshire from 2017–2022.
- Population: 12,537 (2021)
- Electorate: 12,090 (2022)
- Major settlements: Irvine (part of)
- Scottish Parliament constituency: Cunninghame South
- Scottish Parliament region: West Scotland
- UK Parliament constituency: Central Ayrshire

Current ward
- Created: 2007
- Number of councillors: 4 (2007–2017); 3 (2017–present)
- Councillor: Marie Burns (SNP)
- Councillor: Nairn Angus-McDonald (Labour)
- Councillor: Angela Stephen (Conservative)

Irvine East is one of the nine wards used to elect members of the North Ayrshire Council. Created in 2007, the ward initially elected four councillors using the single transferable vote electoral system before a boundary review in 2017 reduced the number of councillors to three. It covers an area with a population of 12,537 people.

The area was a Labour stronghold with the party holding half the seats between 2007 and 2017. However, since the boundaries were changed, the ward has been split between Labour, the Scottish National Party (SNP) and the Conservatives with each party holding one seat since 2017.

== Boundaries ==
Irvine East was created following the Fourth Statutory Reviews of Electoral Arrangements ahead of the 2007 Scottish local elections. As a result of the Local Governance (Scotland) Act 2004, local elections in Scotland would use the single transferable vote electoral system from 2007 onwards so Irvine East was formed from an amalgamation of several previous first-past-the-post wards. It contained all of the former Bourtreehill and Dreghorn wards as well as most of the former Irvine Landward and Woodlands North and Girdle Toll wards and a small part of the former Eglinton and Lawthorn ward. The ward covered eastern parts of Irvine including everything east of the A78 and north of the A71 up to the council's border with East Ayrshire. The Fifth Statutory Review of Electoral Arrangements saw the ward's area reduced as a new Irvine South ward was created. As a result, the Broomlands area of Irvine as well as the villages of Dreghorn and Springside were transferred to the new ward and Irvine East was reduced from a four-member ward to a three-member ward. The ward's boundaries were unchanged following the 2019 Reviews of Electoral Arrangements.

== Councillors ==
Election	Councillors			
2007	Tom Barr (Labour)	John Moffat (Labour)	Ruby Kirkwood (Liberal Democrats)	Joan Sturgeon (SNP)
2012	John Easdale (Labour)	Irene Oldfather (Labour)	Marie Burns (SNP)	Joan Sturgeon (SNP)
2017	John Easdale (Labour)	Angela Stephen (Conservative)	Marie Burns (SNP)	
2022	Nairn Angus-McDonald (Labour)	Angela Stephen (Conservative)	Marie Burns (SNP)	

== Election results ==
=== 2022 election ===
Irvine East - 3 seats
Party	Candidate	FPv%	Count						
Party	Candidate	FPv%	1	2	3	4	5	6	7
SNP	Marie Burns (incumbent)	36.5	1,470						
Labour	Nairn McDonald	27.2	1,096						
Conservative	Angela Stephen (incumbent)	19.7	795	797	818	839	885	913	1,097
SNP	Susan Johnson	8.0	323	696	706	718	730	874	
Scottish Green	Ross Colins	4.2	171	219	227	239	278		
Liberal Democrats	Barry Keith Jackson	2.6	106	111	130	139			
Scottish Family	Karin Craig	1.5	64	70	76				
Electorate: 10,204 Valid: 4,025 Spoilt: 87 Quota: 1,007 Turnout: 40.3%

=== 2017 election ===
Irvine East - 3 seats
Party	Candidate	FPv%	Count					
Party	Candidate	FPv%	1	2	3	4	5	6
SNP	Marie Burns (incumbent)	33.5	1,334					
Conservative	Angela Stephen	26.7	1,065					
Labour	John Easdale (incumbent)	16.2	646	664	676	716	846	1,403
Labour	Irene Oldfather (incumbent)	13.4	536	547	566	598	672	
SNP	Hugh Wilson	6.4	254	519	520	574		
Scottish Green	Ross Collins	3.8	150	170	177			
Electorate: 9,922 Valid: 3,985 Spoilt: 83 Quota: 997 Turnout: 41.0%

=== 2012 election ===
Irvine East - 4 seats
Party	Candidate	FPv%	Count									
Party	Candidate	FPv%	1	2	3	4	5	6	7	8	9	10
SNP	Joan Sturgeon (incumbent)	20.6	1,045									
SNP	Marie Burns	18.1	917	941	941	960	998	1,039				
Labour	Irene Oldfather	15.0	763	764	766	782	819	851	854	1,032		
Labour	John Easdale	12.7	643	643	645	652	673	697	700	874	886	1,098
Independent	Tom Barr (incumbent)	10.6	537	538	542	558	604	742	746	763	765	
Labour	David Logan	8.1	413	413	415	428	445	452	454			
Conservative	Chris Barr	7.4	377	377	377	377	409					
Liberal Democrats	Ruby Kirkwood (incumbent)	5.2	263	263	263	267						
Scottish Socialist	Denise Morton	1.7	89	89	98							
Socialist Labour	James McDaid	0.5	27	27								
Electorate: 14,994 Valid: 5,074 Spoilt: 116 Quota: 1,015 Turnout: 33.8%

=== 2007 election ===
Irvine East - 4 seats
Party	Candidate	FPv%	Count						
Party	Candidate	FPv%	1	2	3	4	5	6	7
SNP	Joan Sturgeon	32.4	2,293						
Labour	Tom Barr	18.4	1,302	1,367	1,377	1,436			
Labour	Jane Gorman	12.0	851	909	916	977	990	1,076	
Labour	John Moffat	12.0	850	930	949	1,027	1,031	1,082	1,701
Conservative	Jane Belding	10.7	759	820	828	861	862		
Liberal Democrats	Ruby Kirkwood	7.7	543	690	718	864	865	1,197	1,314
Solidarity	Danny McGregor	5.0	355	489	578				
Scottish Socialist	Denise Morton	1.7	117	200					
Electorate: 14,852 Valid: 7,070 Spoilt: 150 Quota: 1,415 Turnout: 48.6%
