= 2017 North Ayrshire Council election =

North Ayrshire Council election

← 2012	4 May 2017	2022 →

All 33 seats to North Ayrshire Council 17 seats needed for a majority
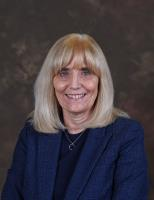

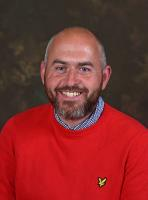

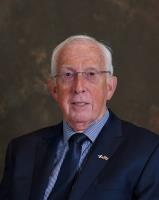
	First party	Second party
Leader	Marie Burns	Joe Cullinane
Party	SNP	Labour
Leader's seat	Irvine East	Kilwinning
Last election	12 seats, 35.6%	11 seats, 31.4%
Seats won	11	11
Seat change	▼1	Steady
Popular vote	16,664	12,320
Percentage	35.2%	26.1%
Swing	▼0.4%	▼5.3%
	Third party	Fourth party
		Ind
Leader	Tom Marshall	Jean Highgate
Party	Conservative	Independent
Leader's seat	North Coast and Cumbraes	Kilbirnie and Beith
Last election	1 seats, 9.3%	6 seats, 19.0%
Seats won	7	4
Seat change	▲6	▼2
Popular vote	11,099	6,130
Percentage	23.5%	13.0%
Swing	▲13.6%	▼6.0%
Council Leader before election
Joe Cullinane
(Labour)
No overall control
Council Leader after election
Joe Cullinane
(Labour)
No overall control

Elections to North Ayrshire Council took place on 4 May 2017 on the same day as the 31 other Scottish local government elections.

The election used the ten wards created as a result of the Fifth Statutory Review of Electoral Arrangements, with each ward electing three or four councillors using the single transferable vote system, a form of proportional representation, with 33 councillors being elected.

After the election, the Labour Party took control of the authority as a minority administration with outgoing council Leader Joe Cullinane being reappointed.

== Election result ==
2017 North Ayrshire Council election result
Party	Seats	Gains	Losses	Net gain/loss	Seats %	Votes %	Votes	+/−
SNP	11	2	3	▼1	33.3	35.2	16,644	▼0.4
Labour	11	2	2	Steady	33.3	26.1	12,320	▼5.3
Conservative	7	6	0	▲6	21.2	23.5	11,099	▲14.2
Independent	4	2	4	▼2	12.1	13.0	6,130	▼6.0
Scottish Green	0	0	0	Steady	0.0	0.9	439	New
No Referendum Maintain Union Pro-Brexit	0	0	0	Steady	0.0	0.5	238	New
Scottish Socialist	0	0	0	Steady	0.0	0.3	165	▼0.5
UKIP	0	0	0	Steady	0.0	0.2	106	▼0.3
Socialist Labour	0	0	0	Steady	0.0	0.2	76	▼0.9
TUSC	0	0	0	Steady	0.0	0.1	42	Steady
Total	33						47,259	

Note: "Votes" are the first preference votes. The net gain/loss and percentage changes relate to the result of the previous Scottish local elections on 3 May 2012. There were three more seats in this election than the previous and, as a result, this may differ from other published sources showing gain/loss relative to seats held at dissolution of Scotland's councils.

== Ward results ==
=== Irvine West ===
Labour retained both their seats while the SNP retained one seat and lost one seat to the Conservatives.

Irvine West - 4 seats
Party	Candidate	FPv%	Count						
Party	Candidate	FPv%	1	2	3	4	5	6	7
Labour	Ian Clarkson (incumbent)	27.7	1,249						
Conservative	Scott Gallacher	22.7	1,025						
SNP	Shaun MacAulay	20.3	914						
SNP	Maria Limonci	15.7	707	722	725	736	769	790	
Labour	Louise McPhater (incumbent)	9.7	438	669	706	707	738	804	1,062
Scottish Green	Andrew Craig	2.1	96	106	117	117			
Socialist Labour	Bobby Cochrane	1.7	76	113	120	121	139		
Electorate: 11,984 Valid: 4,505 Spoilt: 121 Quota: 902 Turnout: 38.6%

=== Irvine East ===
Boundary changes resulted in Irvine East being reduced in size from a four-member ward to a three-member ward. As a result, both the SNP and Labour retained only one of the two seats they had won at the previous election and the Conservatives gained one seat.

Irvine East - 3 seats
Party	Candidate	FPv%	Count					
Party	Candidate	FPv%	1	2	3	4	5	6
SNP	Marie Burns (incumbent)	33.5	1,334					
Conservative	Angela Stephen	26.7	1,065					
Labour	John Easdale (incumbent)	16.2	646	664	676	716	846	1,403
Labour	Irene Oldfather (incumbent)	13.4	536	547	566	598	672	
SNP	Hugh Wilson	6.4	254	519	520	574		
Scottish Green	Ross Collins	3.8	150	170	177			
Electorate: 9,922 Valid: 3,985 Spoilt: 83 Quota: 997 Turnout: 41.0%

=== Kilwinning ===
Labour (2) and the SNP (1) retained the seats they had won at the previous election while the Conservatives gained one seat from former independent councillor Robert Steel.

Kilwinning - 4 seats
Party	Candidate	FPv%	Count					
Party	Candidate	FPv%	1	2	3	4	5	6
Labour	Joe Cullinane (incumbent)	33.9	1,949					
SNP	Scott Davidson	25.5	1,466					
Conservative	John Glover	21.3	1,224					
SNP	Susan Johnson	8.0	460	501	768	770	776	859
Labour	Donald Reid (incumbent)	7.00	402	1,011	1,019	1,041	1,073	1,152
Scottish Green	Yvonne McLellan	3.4	193	232	251	258	274	
UKIP	Matthew John Grainger	1.0	60	74	76	91		
Electorate: 13,420 Valid: 5,754 Spoilt: 151 Quota: 1,151 Turnout: 44.0%

=== Stevenston ===
Stevenston was a new ward created from the former Saltcoats and Stevenston ward which was abolished. The new ward elected two Labour and one SNP councillors.

Stevenston - 3 seats
Party	Candidate	FPv%	Count							
Party	Candidate	FPv%	1	2	3	4	5	6	7	8
SNP	Davina McTiernan	21.5	782	790	808	826	1,373			
Labour	John Sweeney	19.1	697	707	748	818	844	924		
SNP	Chris Paton	16.5	601	605	620	630				
Labour	Jimmy Miller (Note: In 2022, Cllr Jimmy Miller resigned from Labour and became an independent.)	15.9	579	592	604	636	654	736	744	961
Conservative	Tom McCammont	15.7	573	587	603	631	639	657	658	
Independent	Alan Munro (Note: Sitting councillor for Saltcoats and Stevenston ward.)	4.7	172	192	230					
Independent	Gerard Pollock	3.9	144	164						
Independent	David Higgins	2.7	97							
Electorate: 9,565 Valid: 3,645 Spoilt: 133 Quota: 912 Turnout: 39.5%

=== Ardrossan and Arran ===
Following boundary changes, Ardrossan and Arran returned one less member than the previous election. The SNP retained both the seats they won at the previous election. The Conservatives gained one seat and both Labour and former independent councillor John Hunter lost their seats.

Ardrossan and Arran - 3 seats
Party	Candidate	FPv%	Count					
Party	Candidate	FPv%	1	2	3	4	5	6
Conservative	Timothy Billings	27.6	1,309					
SNP	Ellen McMaster (Note: Cllr Ellen McMaster twice changed political affiliation first joining the Alba Party before becoming an independent.)	19.7	932	937	1,000	1,002	1,034	1,159
SNP	Tony Gurney (incumbent)	19.6	930	932	946	955	1,092	1,245
Labour	Clare McGuire	13.9	659	677	723	792	979	
Independent	John Hunter (incumbent)	10.6	503	517	534	627		
No Referendum Maintain Union Pro-Brexit	Gordon Allison	5.0	238	280	285			
Scottish Socialist	Colin Turbett	3.5	165	170				
Electorate: 9,622 Valid: 4,736 Spoilt: 123 Quota: 1,185 Turnout: 50.5%

=== Dalry and West Kilbride ===
The SNP and independent councillor Robert Barr retained the seats they had won at the previous election while the Conservatives gained one seat from independent candidate Elizabeth McLardy.

Dalry and West Kilbride - 3 seats
Party	Candidate	FPv%	Count					
Party	Candidate	FPv%	1	2	3	4	5	6
SNP	Joy Brahim	23.8	1,219	1,223	1,247	1,289		
Conservative	Todd Ferguson	22.2	1,137	1,137	1,177	1,247	1,247	1,314
Independent	Robert Barr (incumbent)	19.3	990	995	1,147	1,222	1,223	1,361
Independent	Kay Hall	11.7	599	600	619	780	782	867
Labour	Paul Reid	8.4	432	437	468	498	499	
Independent	Elizabeth McLardy (incumbent)	8.2	418	423	433			
Independent	Sheena Woodside	5.9	301	307				
Independent	John Willis	0.5	27					
Electorate: 10,027 Valid: 5,123 Spoilt: 91 Quota: 1,281 Turnout: 52.0%

=== Kilbirnie and Beith ===
The SNP and Labour retained the seats they had won at the previous election and independent candidate Donald L. Reid gained a seat from retiring independent councillor Jean Highgate.

Kilbirnie and Beith - 3 seats
Party	Candidate	FPv%	Count				
Party	Candidate	FPv%	1	2	3	4	5
SNP	Anthea Dickson (incumbent)	22.3	1,057	1,061	1,091	1,617	
Independent	Donald L. Reid	22.2	1,053	1,074	1,182	1,203	
Labour	John Bell (incumbent)	19.5	925	1,031	1,062	1,096	1,235
Conservative	Ted Nevill	14.9	705	712	731	735	751
SNP	Margaret Johnson	12.1	574	576	610		
Independent	James Smith	5.6	263	267			
Labour	James Robson	3.3	156				
Electorate: 10,600 Valid: 4,733 Spoilt: 122 Quota: 1,184 Turnout: 45.8%

=== North Coast and Cumbraes ===
The Conservatives and Labour retained the seats they had won at the previous election while the SNP held one seat and lost one seat to independent candidate Ian Murdoch.

North Coast and Cumbraes - 4 seats
Party	Candidate	FPv%	Count					
Party	Candidate	FPv%	1	2	3	4	5	6
Conservative	Tom Marshall (incumbent)	37.0	2,686					
SNP	Alan Hill (incumbent)	19.4	1,406	1,450	1,451			
Labour	Alex Gallagher (incumbent)	16.0	1,160	1,461				
SNP	Grace McLean (incumbent)	14.8	1,075	1,091	1,091	1,092	1,112	
Independent	Ian Murdoch	11.0	801	1,110	1,113	1,113	1,272	1,767
Independent	Johnny McCloskey	1.7	124	239	241	241		
Electorate: 13,596 Valid: 7,252 Spoilt: 117 Quota: 1,451 Turnout: 54.2%

=== Saltcoats ===
Saltcoats was a new ward created from parts of Ardrossan and Arran ward – which was retained but reduced in size – and the former Saltcoats and Stevenston ward which was abolished. The new ward elected one Labour, one SNP and one independent councillor.

Saltcoats - 3 seats
Party	Candidate	FPv%	Count						
Party	Candidate	FPv%	1	2	3	4	5	6	7
Labour	Jim Montgomerie	30.7	1,279						
SNP	Jean McClung	21.6	900	914	914	935	1,508		
Conservative	Brandon Clydesdale	15.8	655	666	682	720	729	749	
SNP	Roberta Bianchini	14.8	619	625	627	637			
Independent	Ronnie McNicol	13.7	570	599	612	677	696	860	1,175
Labour	Valerie Reid	2.4	100	240	249				
UKIP	Caroline Santos	1.1	46	48					
Electorate: 10,007 Valid: 4,169 Spoilt: 134 Quota: 1,043 Turnout: 43.0%

=== Irvine South ===
Irvine South was a new ward created from parts of Irvine East and Irvine West which were retained but reduced in size. The new ward elected one SNP, one Conservative and one Labour councillor.

Irvine South - 3 seats
Party	Candidate	FPv%	Count					
Party	Candidate	FPv%	1	2	3	4	5	6
SNP	Christina Larsen	21.8	733	743	752	771	789	1,437
Conservative	Margaret George	21.4	720	722	742	768	820	829
SNP	Robin Sturgeon	20.3	681	684	684	701	710	
Labour	Robert Foster	20.1	676	681	695	1,033		
Labour	David O'Neill (Note: Sitting councillor for Irvine West.)	13.0	437	443	453			
Independent	Audrey Hynd-Gaw	2.0	68	77				
TUSC	Ian Kerr	1.2	42					
Electorate: 8,847 Valid: 3,357 Spoilt: 111 Quota: 840 Turnout: 39.2%

=== Dalry and West Kilbride by-election ===
Dalry and West Kilbride SNP councillor Joy Brahim resigned her seat on 14 May 2021 due to illness. A by-election was held on 12 August to fill the vacancy and was gained by the Conservative's Ronnie Stalker.

Dalry and West Kilbride by-election (12 August 2021) – 1 seat
Party	Candidate	FPv%	Count
Party	Candidate	FPv%	1
Conservative	Ronnie Stalker	53.5	2,016
SNP	Robyn Graham	34.3	1,292
Labour	Valerie Reid	8.1	305
Liberal Democrats	Ruby Kirkwood	1.5	58
Socialist Labour	James McDaid	1.5	57
Independent	John Willis	1.1	42
Electorate: 10,476 Valid: 3,770 Spoilt: 31 Quota: 1,886 Turnout: 36.3%
