= Irvine West (ward) =

Electoral ward in North Ayrshire

- North Ayrshire
- Boundary of Irvine West in North Ayrshire from 2017–2022.
- Population: 14,972 (2021)
- Electorate: 12,090 (2022)
- Major settlements: Irvine (part of)
- Scottish Parliament constituency: Cunninghame South
- Scottish Parliament region: West Scotland
- UK Parliament constituency: Central Ayrshire

Current ward
- Created: 1980
- Number of councillors: 1 (1980–2007); 4 (2007–present)
- Councillor: Shaun MacAulay (SNP)
- Councillor: Scott Gallacher (Conservative)
- Councillor: Chloe Robertson (SNP)
- Councillor: Louise McPhater (Labour)

Irvine West is one of the nine wards used to elect members of the North Ayrshire Council. Created in 1980, Irvine West was originally a single-member first-past-the-post ward before it was expanded in 2007 to become a multi-member ward which elects four councillors using the single transferable vote electoral system and covers an area with a population of 14,972 people.

== Boundaries ==
Irvine West was created by the Initial Statutory Reviews of Electoral Arrangements in 1979 as one of the 30 wards of Cunninghame District Council. The original boundaries took in the western part of Irvine on the Firth of Clyde coast up to the River Garnock and included the abandoned Snodgrass Village and Bogside Racecourse. There were minor changes to the boundaries following the Second Statutory Reviews of Electoral Arrangements in 1994 which saw the ward's southern boundary extended south to the council's border with Kyle and Carrick District Council to include the Dundonald Links golf course. After the implementation of the Local Government etc. (Scotland) Act 1994, the boundaries proposed by the second review became the Formation Electoral Arrangements for the newly created North Ayrshire Council – a unitary authority for the area previously under Cunninghame District Council. Further minor alterations saw the ward's northeastern boundary moved east following the Third Statutory Reviews of Electoral Arrangements in 1998 to run along Kilwinning Road.

As a result of the Local Governance (Scotland) Act 2004, council elections would be run under the single transferable vote and new multi-member wards would be introduced. As a result, Irvine West was combined with other wards covering Irvine. The former Irvine North, Irvine Townhead and Irvine Vineburgh and Woodlands South were completely subsumed and a small area from both of the former Irvine Landward and Woodlands North and Girdle Toll wards were added. The new boundaries would cover everything west of the A78 plus the south-eastern industrial area around Drybridge and Shewalton. The Fifth Statutory Review of Electoral Arrangements saw the ward's area reduced as a new Irvine South ward was created. As a result, territory west of the River Irvine including the abandoned Bogside Racecourse, the Fullarton area of Irvine, and everything south of the A71 was transferred to Irvine South. Despite the changes, which saw the ward's area halved, Irvine West retained four councillors. The ward's boundaries were unchanged following the 2019 Reviews of Electoral Arrangements.

== Councillors ==
Election	Councillors			
2007	Matt Brown (SNP)	Ian Clarkson (Labour)	David O'Neill (Labour)	Pat McPhee (Conservative)
2012	Matt Brown (SNP)	Ian Clarkson (Labour)	David O'Neill (Labour)	Ruth Maguire (SNP)
2016 by-election	Matt Brown (SNP)	Ian Clarkson (Labour)	David O'Neill (Labour)	Louise McPhater (Labour)
2017	Shaun MacAulay (SNP)	Ian Clarkson (Labour)	Scott Gallacher (Conservative)	Louise McPhater (Labour)
2022	Shaun MacAulay (SNP)	Chloe Robertson (SNP)	Scott Gallacher (Conservative)	Louise McPhater (Labour)

== Election results ==
=== 2022 election ===
Irvine West - 4 seats
Party	Candidate	FPv%	Count									
Party	Candidate	FPv%	1	2	3	4	5	6	7	8	9	10
SNP	Shaun MacAulay (incumbent)	27.3	1,274									
Conservative	Scott Gallacher (incumbent)	19.9	932	934								
Labour	Louise McPhater (incumbent)	15.6	729	738	738	746	748	757	792	814	816	1,472
Labour	Sylvia Mallinson	14.1	660	674	674	676	678	697	758	788	790	
SNP	Chloe Robertson	13.3	623	894	894	905	906	909	922	948		
Socialist Labour	Bobby Cochrane	3.2	150	155	155	168	172	181				
Independent	Kevin T. Blades	2.8	133	136	136	139	165	184	212			
Liberal Democrats	Lewis Dominic Hutton	1.5	72	75	75	76	81					
Independent	Tristan Lindsay	1.0	47	49	49	53						
Scottish Socialist	Colin Turbett	0.9	46	47	47							
Electorate: 12,090 Valid: 4,666 Spoilt: 142 Quota: 934 Turnout: 39.8%

=== 2017 election ===
Irvine West - 4 seats
Party	Candidate	FPv%	Count						
Party	Candidate	FPv%	1	2	3	4	5	6	7
Labour	Ian Clarkson (incumbent)	27.7	1,249						
Conservative	Scott Gallacher	22.7	1,025						
SNP	Shaun MacAulay	20.3	914						
SNP	Maria Limonci	15.7	707	722	725	736	769	790	
Labour	Louise McPhater (incumbent)	9.7	438	669	706	707	738	804	1,062
Scottish Green	Andrew Craig	2.1	96	106	117	117			
Socialist Labour	Bobby Cochrane	1.7	76	113	120	121	139		
Electorate: 11,984 Valid: 4,505 Spoilt: 121 Quota: 902 Turnout: 38.6%

=== 2016 by-election ===
Irvine West by-election (11 August 2016) - 1 Seat
Party	Candidate	FPv%	Count					
Party	Candidate	FPv%	1	2	3	4	5	6
SNP	Robin Sturgeon	37.5	1,164	1,168	1,207	1,226	1,277	
Labour	Louise McPhater	33.1	1,029	1,046	1,060	1,118	1,301	1,697
Conservative	Angela Stephen	20.6	639	650	655	658		
Socialist Labour	Bobby Cochrane	4.2	131	133	146			
Scottish Green	Josh McCormick	3.0	94	100				
Liberal Democrats	Nick Smith	1.5	48					
Electorate: 14,849 Valid: 3,105 Spoilt: 46 Quota: 1,553 Turnout: 20.9%

=== 2012 election ===
Irvine West - 4 seats
Party	Candidate	FPv%	Count								
Party	Candidate	FPv%	1	2	3	4	5	6	7	8	9
SNP	Matthew Brown (incumbent)	31.6	1,624								
Labour	Ian Clarkson (incumbent)	26.8	1,374								
Labour	David O'Neill (incumbent)	13.5	691	720	950	958	995	1,039			
Conservative	Pat McPhee (incumbent)	12.0	614	634	652	653	657	682	683	773	
SNP	Ruth Maguire (Note: Irvine West SNP councillor Ruth Maguire was elected as a MSP for Cunninghame South at the 2016 Scottish Parliament election. She resigned her council seat on 25 May 2016 and a by-election was held on 11 August 2016 which was won by Labour's Louise McPhater.)	5.2	265	695	704	713	730	769	770	840	945
Liberal Democrats	Gordon Bain	4.8	246	272	283	289	300	330	331		
Independent	Derek Owen	3.6	187	197	202	216	231				
Socialist Labour	Bobby Cochrane	1.6	81	92	112	123					
TUSC	Ian Kerr	1.0	51	61	65						
Electorate: 14,793 Valid: 5,133 Spoilt: 157 Quota: 1,027 Turnout: 34.7%

=== 2007 election ===
Irvine West - 4 seats
Party	Candidate	FPv%	Count						
Party	Candidate	FPv%	1	2	3	4	5	6	7
SNP	Matt Brown	31.6	2,247						
Labour	Ian Clarkson	24.0	1,710						
Conservative	Pat McPhee	11.2	799	875	883	888	1,059	1,159	1,225
Labour	David O'Neill	10.9	776	829	881	899	979	1,077	1,726
Solidarity	Jim Byrne	7.3	517	695	708	738	830		
Labour	John McKay	7.1	508	573	711	748	844	999	
Liberal Democrats	Iain Rubie Dale	6.4	453	613	633	655			
Socialist Labour	Bobby Cochrane	1.5	103	141	152				
Electorate: 14,993 Valid: 7,113 Spoilt: 156 Quota: 1,423 Turnout: 48.5%

=== 2003 election ===
Irvine West
Party	Candidate	Votes	%	±%
Labour	David O'Neill	761	43.9	▲1.1
SNP	C. McKenzie	485	28.0	▼7.7
Conservative	D. Belding	227	13.1	▲0.5
Scottish Socialist	J. Gray	191	11.0	▲6.1
Socialist Labour	R. Cochrane	70	4.0	Steady
Majority		276	15.9	▲8.8
Turnout		1,562	44.9	▼12.1
Registered electors		3,860		
Labour hold		Swing	▲2.7	

=== 1999 election ===
Irvine West
Party	Candidate	Votes	%	±%
Labour	David O'Neill	949	42.8	▼17.7
SNP	Catherine McKenzie	790	35.7	▼3.8
Conservative	David Belding	279	12.6	New
Scottish Socialist	Gwen Edwin	108	4.9	New
Socialist Labour	Robert Cochrane	89	4.0	New
Majority		159	7.1	▼13.9
Turnout		2,215	57.0	▲14.5
Registered electors		3,907		
Labour hold		Swing	▼10.7	

=== 1995 election ===
Irvine West
Party	Candidate	Votes	%	±%
Labour	David O'Neill	768	60.5	▲12.3
SNP	Catherine McKenzie	501	39.5	▲5.6
Majority		267	21.0	▲6.6
Turnout		1,269	42.5	▲6.7
Registered electors		2,988		
Labour hold		Swing	▲12.3	

=== 1992 election ===
Irvine West
Party	Candidate	Votes	%	±%
Labour	D. O'Neill	495	48.2	▼11.3
SNP	L. Brown	348	33.9	▲7.1
Independent	E. Holmes	177	17.2	New
Majority		147	14.3	▼18.4
Turnout		1,020	35.8	▼11.7
Registered electors		2,872		
Labour hold		Swing	▼9.2	

=== 1988 election ===
Irvine West
Party	Candidate	Votes	%	±%
Labour	D. O'Neill	852	59.5	▲2.4
SNP	L. Brown	383	26.8	▲0.3
Independent Labour	C. McDowall	95	6.6	New
SSLD	J. McDill	91	6.4	New
Majority		469	32.7	▲12.1
Turnout		1,421	47.5	▼6.2
Registered electors		3,011		
Labour hold		Swing	▲2.4	

=== 1984 election ===
Irvine West
Party	Candidate	Votes	%	±%
Labour	D. O'Neill	916	57.1	▼3.5
SNP	M. Brown	424	26.5	New
Independent	J. Smith	263	16.4	New
Majority		338	20.6	▼0.7
Turnout		1,603	53.7	▼0.9
Registered electors		2,986		
Labour hold		Swing	▼1.7	

=== 1980 election ===
Irvine West
Party	Candidate	Votes	%
Labour	D. O'Neill	961	60.6
Independent	J. Caldwell	623	39.3
Majority		338	21.3
Turnout		1,584	54.6
Registered electors		2,903	
Labour win (new seat)			
