= Archie Manuel =

Archibald Clark Manuel (1 March 1901 – 10 October 1976) was a Scottish railwayman and politician who was member of parliament for Central Ayrshire.

Manuel only had an elementary school education, but later in life went to classes through the National Council of Labour. He worked on the railways as an engine driver, and was a member of ASLEF.

Originally from Morvern, in Argyll, he lived in Ardrossan where he joined the Labour Party in 1927. He became a member of the Town Council, and was later elected to Ayrshire County Council. He was appointed to the Western Regional Hospital Board and to the Ayrshire Executive Council of the National Health Service.

In the 1950 general election Manuel was elected to Parliament for Central Ayrshire. He was re-elected in 1951 but lost the seat in 1955. Persisting despite this rejection, he was re-elected in 1959 when Scotland swung to Labour.

A great friend of the Secretary of State for Scotland Willie Ross, Manuel was (like Ross) a ferocious opponent of the Scottish National Party. In an adjournment debate in the Commons in November 1969, Manuel joined in the general attack on the sole SNP MP Winnie Ewing, calling her "a Tory in disguise" and "a parasite". Manuel retired in 1970. He died in Birkenhead aged 75.

Parliament of the United Kingdom
New constituency	Member of Parliament for Central Ayrshire; 1950–1955	Succeeded by Douglas Spencer-Nairn
Preceded by Douglas Spencer-Nairn	Member of Parliament for Central Ayrshire; 1959–1970	Succeeded by David Lambie
