= Central Ayrshire =

UK Parliament constituency (since 2005)

- County constituency for the House of Commons
- Interactive map of boundaries from 2005
- Boundary of Central Ayrshire in Scotland
- Subdivision: North Ayrshire, South Ayrshire
- Electorate: 69,779 (March 2020)
- Major settlements: Irvine, Prestwick, Troon

Current constituency
- Created: 2005
- Member of Parliament: Alan Gemmell (Labour)
- Created from: Cunninghame South, Ayr

1950–1983
- Created from: Ayr Burghs, Bute and Northern Ayrshire, and Kilmarnock
- Replaced by: Cunninghame South, Cunninghame North and Ayr

Overlaps
- Scottish Parliament: Ayr, Carrick, Cumnock & Doon Valley, Cunninghame South

Central Ayrshire is a constituency of the British House of Commons, located in the south-west of Scotland within the North Ayrshire and South Ayrshire council areas. It elects one Member of Parliament (MP) at least once every five years using the first-past-the-post system of voting. It has been represented since 2024 by Alan Gemmell of Scottish Labour.

== Boundaries ==
1950–1974: The burghs of Irvine, Kilwinning, Stewarton and Troon, the districts of Irvine and Kilbirnie, the electoral division of Dundonald in the district of Ayr, and the electoral division of Dunlop and Stewarton in the district of Kilmarnock.

1974–1983: The burghs of Irvine, Kilwinning and Troon, the districts of Irvine and Kilbirnie and the electoral division of Dundonald in the district of Ayr.

2005–present: Under the Fifth Review of UK Parliament constituencies, the constituency contained parts of the North Ayrshire and South Ayrshire Councils; the boundaries were defined in accordance with the ward structure in place on 30 November 2004. Under the 2023 review of Westminster constituencies, which came into effect for the 2024 general election, the boundaries were unchanged.

Further to reviews of local government ward boundaries which came into effect in 2007 and 2017, but did not affect the parliamentary boundaries, the contents of the constituency are now defined as follows:

- In full: the North Ayrshire Council wards of Irvine East, Irvine South, and Irvine West; and the South Ayrshire Council wards of Kyle, Prestwick, and Troon.
- In part: the North Ayrshire Council ward of Kilwinning (small southeastern area); and the South Ayrshire Council wards of Ayr North (Woodfield area of Ayr), and Maybole, North Carrick and Coylton (very small area).

== Constituency profile ==
The constituency covers towns such as Irvine and parts of Kilwinning to the north, as well as the coastal resorts of Troon and Prestwick to the south. The seat also takes in a set of villages in rural South Ayrshire including the former mining communities of Annbank, Mossblown and Tarbolton alongside the villages of Loans, Dundonald and Symington.

Irvine was designated in the 1970s as a Glasgow overspill new town. In recent local council elections, the SNP have performed strongly in the town of Irvine gaining 3 Councillors to Labours 5 in Irvine and Kilwinning wards.

The coastal towns of Prestwick and Troon join the town as part of the constituency as well as outlying rural areas located south and east of Troon and Prestwick: Prestwick, Troon and their hinterlands have sustained a considerable level of support for Conservative candidates locally and as part of the Ayr constituency in the Scottish Parliament. Heathfield in Ayr North also forms part of the constituency: this area is relatively small but has been more supportive of the SNP in recent council elections.

== History ==
As created in 1950, the constituency merged parts of the Bute and Northern Ayrshire and Kilmarnock constituencies. Following the Representation of the People Act 1948, the Central Ayrshire constituency between 1950 and 1955 consisted of Irvine, Kilwinning, Stewarton, Troon, Kilbirnie and part of the district of Kilmarnock. When abolished in 1983, the constituency was largely replaced by Cunninghame South, with Troon and its surrounding areas forming part of the Ayr constituency.

The constituency was re-established in 2005, centred around the historic burgh of Irvine and stretching north to cover part of Kilwinning and south to cover the coastal resort towns of Prestwick, Troon and their adjacent hinterlands alongside part of Ayr. The constituency covers the 2017 electoral wards of Irvine East, Irvine South, Irvine West and a small section of Kilwinning (between the River Garnock and the B778) from the North Ayrshire Council area and Prestwick, Troon, Kyle and a small section of Ayr North (between Seaforth Road and Lochside Road in Heathfield) from the South Ayrshire Council area. The remainder of the North Ayrshire Council area is represented as part of the North Ayrshire and Arran Parliamentary constituency, with the remainder of South Ayrshire being covered by the Ayr, Carrick and Cumnock Parliamentary constituency alongside parts of East Ayrshire.

The boundaries were unchanged by the 2023 review of Westminster constituencies.

=== Election history ===
The seat has mostly elected Labour Party MPs since the 1950s, with the former MP Brian Donohoe having represented the seat since its creation in 2005, and was MP for the predecessor seat of Cunninghame South since the 1992 general election. He lost his seat at the 2015 general election during an SNP landslide in Scotland, in which the SNP's Philippa Whitford was elected with a majority of 13,589 votes. At the 2017 local election the Conservatives were well ahead in Prestwick and Troon in South Ayrshire, with the SNP finishing first in Irvine in North Ayrshire. Philippa Whitford returned as the Member of Parliament for the Central Ayrshire constituency at the 2017 general election with a significantly reduced majority of 1,267 votes (2.8%) ahead of Conservative challenger Caroline Hollins-Martin. At the 2019 UK election, Philippa Whitford was returned as Member of Parliament for the third time, increasing her majority to 5,304 votes (11.4%). Labour came from a poor third place in 2019 to regain the seat at the 2024 general election, with Alan Gemmell being elected with a majority of 16.6% over the SNP, achieved with a swing of nearly 25%.

== Members of Parliament ==
Election	Member	Party
1950	Archie Manuel	Labour
1955	Douglas Spencer-Nairn	Unionist
1959	Archie Manuel	Labour
1970	David Lambie	Labour
1983	constituency abolished: see Ayr and Cunninghame South	
2005	constituency created, see Ayr, Carrick, Cumnock and Doon Valley and Cunninghame South	
2005	Brian Donohoe	Labour
2015	Philippa Whitford	Scottish National Party
2024	Alan Gemmell	Labour

== Elections ==
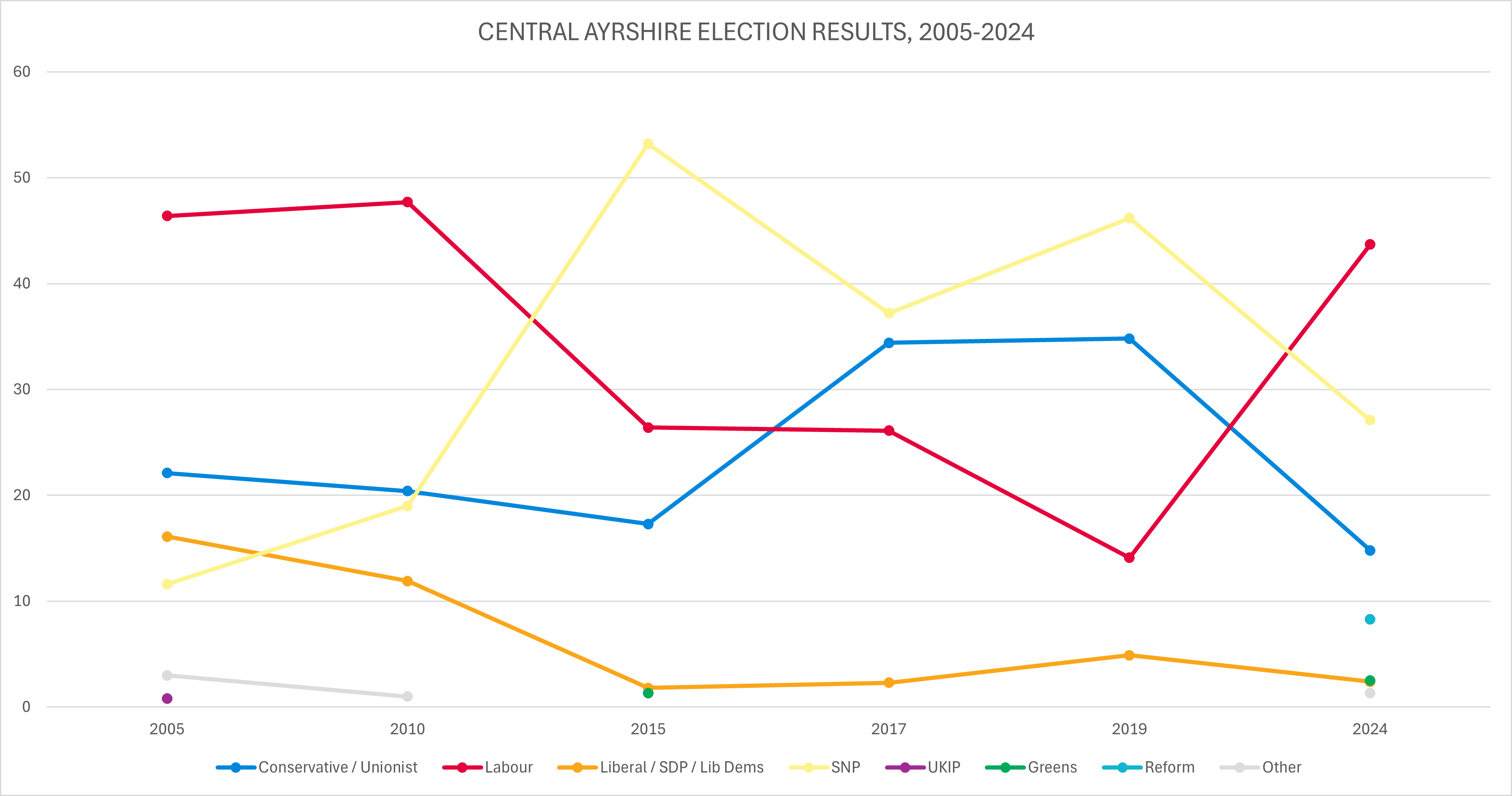
Election results 2005-2024

=== Elections in the 2020s ===
General election 2024: Central Ayrshire
Party	Candidate	Votes	%	±%
Labour	Alan Gemmell	18,091	43.7	+29.6
SNP	Annie McIndoe	11,222	27.1	−19.1
Conservative	David Rocks	6,147	14.8	−20.0
Reform	Kevin Blades	3,420	8.3	N/A
Green	Tom Kerr	1,039	2.5	N/A
Liberal Democrats	Elaine Ford	983	2.4	−2.5
Socialist Labour	Louise McDaid	329	0.8	N/A
SDP	Allan MacMillan	188	0.5	N/A
Majority		6,869	16.6	N/A
Turnout		41,419	59.7	−7.0
Registered electors		69,413		
Labour gain from SNP		Swing	+24.3	

=== Elections in the 2010s ===
General election 2019: Central Ayrshire
Party	Candidate	Votes	%	±%
SNP	Philippa Whitford	21,486	46.2	+9.0
Conservative	Derek Stillie	16,182	34.8	+0.4
Labour	Louise McPhater	6,583	14.1	−12.0
Liberal Democrats	Emma Farthing	2,283	4.9	+2.6
Majority		5,304	11.4	+8.6
Turnout		46,534	66.7	+1.4
SNP hold		Swing	+4.3	

General election 2017: Central Ayrshire
Party	Candidate	Votes	%	±%
SNP	Philippa Whitford	16,771	37.2	−16.0
Conservative	Caroline Hollins-Martin	15,504	34.4	+17.1
Labour	Nairn McDonald	11,762	26.1	−0.3
Liberal Democrats	Tom Inglis	1,050	2.3	+0.5
Majority		1,267	2.8	−24.0
Turnout		45,087	65.3	−7.2
SNP hold		Swing	−16.5	

General election 2015: Central Ayrshire
Party	Candidate	Votes	%	±%
SNP	Philippa Whitford	26,999	53.2	+34.2
Labour	Brian Donohoe	13,410	26.4	−21.3
Conservative	Marc Hope	8,803	17.3	−3.1
Liberal Democrats	Gordon Bain	917	1.8	−10.1
Green	Veronika Tudhope	645	1.3	New
Majority		13,589	26.8	N/A
Turnout		50,774	72.5	+8.3
SNP gain from Labour		Swing	+27.7	

General election 2010: Central Ayrshire
Party	Candidate	Votes	%	±%
Labour	Brian Donohoe	20,950	47.7	+1.3
Conservative	Maurice Golden	8,943	20.4	−1.7
SNP	John Mullen	8,364	19.0	+7.4
Liberal Democrats	Andrew Chamberlain	5,236	11.9	−4.2
Socialist Labour	James McDaid	422	1.0	−0.1
Majority		12,007	27.3	+3.0
Turnout		43,915	64.2	+1.7
Labour hold		Swing	+1.5	

=== Elections in the 2000s ===
General election 2005: Central Ayrshire
Party	Candidate	Votes	%	±%
Labour	Brian Donohoe	19,905	46.4	−2.8
Conservative	Garry Clark	9,482	22.1	−4.1
Liberal Democrats	Iain Kennedy	6,881	16.1	+9.7
SNP	Jahangir Hanif	4,969	11.6	−3.0
Scottish Socialist	Denise Morton	820	1.9	−1.0
Socialist Labour	Robert Cochrane	468	1.1	+0.5
UKIP	Jim Groves	346	0.8	+0.7
Majority		10,423	24.3	−1.3
Turnout		42,871	62.5	+1.0
Labour win (new seat)				

=== Elections in the 1970s ===
General election 1979: Central Ayrshire
Party	Candidate	Votes	%	±%
Labour	David Lambie	27,438	51.1	+6.0
Conservative	R. Wilkinson	15,734	29.3	+4.5
SNP	Ian Macdonald	5,596	10.4	−14.1
Liberal	I Clarkson	4,896	9.1	+3.5
Majority		11,704	21.8	+1.5
Turnout		53,664	79.8	+0.5
Labour hold		Swing		

General election October 1974: Central Ayrshire
Party	Candidate	Votes	%	±%
Labour	David Lambie	21,188	45.1	−3.9
Conservative	M. Carse	11,633	24.8	−11.2
SNP	L. Anderson	11,533	24.5	+9.5
Liberal	J. Watts	2,640	5.6	New
Majority		9,555	20.3	+7.3
Turnout		46,994	79.3	−2.8
Labour hold		Swing		

General election February 1974: Central Ayrshire
Party	Candidate	Votes	%	±%
Labour	David Lambie	23,639	49.0	−3.4
Conservative	R. Gavin	17,362	36.0	−5.8
SNP	L. Anderson	7,255	15.0	+9.9
Majority		6,277	13.0	+2.4
Turnout		48,226	82.1	+1.5
Labour hold		Swing		

General election 1970: Central Ayrshire
Party	Candidate	Votes	%	±%
Labour	David Lambie	24,536	52.4	−5.3
Conservative	Ian Lang	19,569	41.8	−0.5
SNP	Alasdair MacDonald	2,383	5.1	New
Independent	Thomas Menzies	339	0.7	New
Majority		4,967	10.6	−4.8
Turnout		46,827	80.6	−1.5
Labour hold		Swing		

=== Elections in the 1960s ===
General election 1966: Central Ayrshire
Party	Candidate	Votes	%	±%
Labour	Archibald Manuel	24,035	57.7	+1.3
Conservative	John Corrie	17,637	42.3	−1.3
Majority		6,398	15.4	+2.5
Turnout		41,672	82.1	−2.0
Labour hold		Swing		

General election 1964: Central Ayrshire
Party	Candidate	Votes	%	±%
Labour	Archibald Manuel	23,999	56.44	+4.45
Conservative	GR Rickman	18,523	43.56	−4.45
Majority		5,476	12.88	+8.90
Turnout		42,522	84.19	−2.50
Labour hold		Swing		

=== Elections in the 1950s ===
General election 1959: Central Ayrshire
Party	Candidate	Votes	%	±%
Labour	Archibald Manuel	21,901	51.99	+2.20
Unionist	Douglas Spencer-Nairn	20,225	48.01	−2.20
Majority		1,676	3.98	N/A
Turnout		42,126	86.69	+3.36
Labour gain from Unionist		Swing		

General election 1955: Central Ayrshire
Party	Candidate	Votes	%	±%
Unionist	Douglas Spencer-Nairn	19,713	50.21	+2.51
Labour	Archibald Manuel	19,546	49.79	−2.51
Majority		167	0.42	N/A
Turnout		39,259	83.33	−3.93
Unionist gain from Labour		Swing		

General election 1951: Central Ayrshire
Party	Candidate	Votes	%	±%
Labour	Archibald Manuel	21,003	52.10	+3.14
Unionist	William Rankine Milligan	19,310	47.90	+4.05
Majority		1,693	4.20	−0.91
Turnout		40,313	86.26	+0.70
Labour hold		Swing		

General election 1950: Central Ayrshire
Party	Candidate	Votes	%	±%
Labour	Archibald Manuel	18,792	48.96	N/A
Unionist	William Rankine Milligan	16,830	43.85	N/A
Liberal	Charles Jack Coleman	2,760	7.19	N/A
Majority		1,962	5.11	N/A
Turnout		38,382	85.56	N/A
Labour hold		Swing		
