= Irvine South (ward) =

Electoral ward of North Ayrshire, Scotland

- North Ayrshire
- Boundary of Irvine South in North Ayrshire from 2017–2022.
- Population: 10,887 (2021)
- Electorate: 8,997 (2022)
- Major settlements: Irvine (part of)
- Scottish Parliament constituency: Cunninghame South
- Scottish Parliament region: West Scotland
- UK Parliament constituency: Central Ayrshire

Current ward
- Created: 2017
- Number of councillors: 3
- Councillor: Christina Larsen (SNP)
- Councillor: Robert Foster (Labour)
- Councillor: Matthew McLean (Conservative)
- Created from: Irvine East; Irvine West

Irvine South is one of the nine electoral wards of North Ayrshire Council. Created in 2017, the ward elects three councillors using the single transferable vote electoral system and covers an area with a population of 10,887 people.

The area has been politically split with each election returning one Scottish National Party (SNP), one Labour and one Conservative councillor.

== Boundaries ==
The ward was created following the Fifth Statutory Reviews of Electoral Arrangements ahead of the 2017 Scottish local elections. This was the first review after the introduction of the single transferable vote electoral system in 2007. Irvine South was one of three new wards created in North Ayrshire as the total number of councillors was increased to more evenly balance electoral parity in the region. Irvine South, as the name suggests, covers southern parts of the town of Irvine and takes in an area to the west of the River Irvine and south of the Annick Water including Fullarton and the mainly industrial area around Drybridge and Shewalton as well as Broomlands and Dreghorn. These areas were previously part of the Irvine East and Irvine West wards. Following the implementation of the Islands (Scotland) Act 2018, the boundaries in North Ayrshire were reviewed but this did not affect the Irvine wards.

== Councillors ==
Election	Councillors		
2017	Christina Larsen (SNP)	Robert Foster (Labour)	Margaret George (Conservative)
2022	Christina Larsen (SNP)	Robert Foster (Labour)	Matthew McLean (Conservative)

== Election results ==
=== 2022 election ===
Irvine South - 3 seats
Party	Candidate	FPv%	Count						
Party	Candidate	FPv%	1	2	3	4	5	6	7
SNP	Christina Larsen (incumbent)	25.9	871						
Labour	Robert Foster (incumbent)	22.6	761	761	765	783	1,048		
Conservative	Matthew McLean	19.3	651	651	656	681	711	759	889
SNP	Joseph Hopkins	18.6	625	652	660	669	691	728	
Labour	David O'Neill	9.7	327	327	336	355			
Scottish Family	Robert John Craig	2.4	81	81	87				
TUSC	Ian Kerr	1.1	40	40					
Electorate: 8,997 Valid: 3,356 Spoilt: 96 Quota: 840 Turnout: 38.4%

=== 2017 election ===
Irvine South - 3 seats
Party	Candidate	FPv%	Count					
Party	Candidate	FPv%	1	2	3	4	5	6
SNP	Christina Larsen	21.8	733	743	752	771	789	1,437
Conservative	Margaret George	21.4	720	722	742	768	820	829
SNP	Robin Sturgeon	20.3	681	684	684	701	710	
Labour	Robert Foster	20.1	676	681	695	1,033		
Labour	David O'Neill (Note: Sitting councillor for Irvine West.)	13.0	437	443	453			
Independent	Audrey Hynd-Gaw	2.0	68	77				
TUSC	Ian Kerr	1.2	42					
Electorate: 8,847 Valid: 3,357 Spoilt: 111 Quota: 840 Turnout: 39.2%
