= Prestwick (ward) =

Electoral ward in South Ayrshire, Scotland

- South Ayrshire
- Boundary of Prestwick in South Ayrshire from 2017.
- Population: 14,220 (2021)
- Electorate: 12,507 (2022)
- Major settlements: Prestwick
- Scottish Parliament constituency: Ayr
- Scottish Parliament region: South Scotland
- UK Parliament constituency: Central Ayrshire

Current ward
- Created: 2007
- Number of councillors: 4
- Councillor: Ian Cochrane (SNP)
- Councillor: Hugh Hunter (Independent)
- Councillor: Martin Kilbride (Conservative)
- Councillor: Cameron Ramsay (Labour)
- Created from: Prestwick Kingcase; Prestwick St Cuthbert's and Monkton; Prestwick St Nicholas'; Prestwick St Ninian's; Prestwick Toll

Prestwick is one of the eight electoral wards of South Ayrshire Council. Created in 2007, the ward elects four councillors using the single transferable vote electoral system and covers an area with a population of 14,220 people.

The area has been a Conservative stronghold with the party holding half the seats between 2007 and 2022.

== Boundaries ==
The ward was created following the Fourth Statutory Reviews of Electoral Arrangements ahead of the 2007 Scottish local elections. As a result of the Local Governance (Scotland) Act 2004, local elections in Scotland would use the single transferable vote electoral system from 2007 onwards so Prestwick was formed from an amalgamation of several previous first-past-the-post wards.

It contained all of the former Prestwick Kingcase, Prestwick St Nicholas' and Prestwick St Ninian's wards as well as the northern part of the former Prestwick Toll ward and the southern half of the former Prestwick St Cuthbert's and Monkton ward. The ward centres on the town of Prestwick which is situated on the Firth of Clyde coast in the northwest of the council area and includes the terminal buildings of Glasgow Prestwick Airport but only part of the runways. The ward's boundaries were unchanged following the Fifth Statutory Reviews of Electoral Arrangements ahead of the 2017 Scottish local elections.

== Councillors ==
Election	Councillors			
2007	Stan Fisher (SNP)	Hugh Hunter (Conservative/ Independent)	Helen Moonie (Labour)	Margaret Toner (Conservative)
2012	Ian Cochrane (SNP)	Hugh Hunter (Conservative/ Independent)	Helen Moonie (Labour)	Margaret Toner (Conservative)
2017	Ian Cochrane (SNP)	Hugh Hunter (Conservative/ Independent)	Helen Moonie (Labour)	Margaret Toner (Conservative)
2022	Ian Cochrane (SNP)	Hugh Hunter (Conservative/ Independent)	Cameron Ramsay (Labour)	Martin Kilbride (Conservative)

== Election results ==
=== 2022 election ===
Prestwick - 4 seats
Party	Candidate	FPv%	Count							
Party	Candidate	FPv%	1	2	3	4	5	6	7	8
SNP	Ian Cochrane (incumbent)	25.5	1,685							
Independent	Hugh Hunter (incumbent)	23.2	1,544							
Conservative	Martin Kilbride	17.0	1,132	1,135	1,195	1,236	1,239	1,726		
Labour	Cameron Ramsay	15.3	1,020	1,038	1,077	1,086	1,100	1,114	1,181	1,591
SNP	Norrie Smith	9.2	614	928	955	958	995	997	1,002	
Conservative	Derek Stillie	7.3	488	488	516	539	544			
Alba	John Caddis	1.1	78	84	90	91				
Conservative	Owen Daniel North	1.0	71	72	79					
Electorate: 12,507 Valid: 6,642 Spoilt: 107 Quota: 1,329 Turnout: 54.0%

=== 2017 election ===
Prestwick - 4 seats
Party	Candidate	FPv%	Count					
Party	Candidate	FPv%	1	2	3	4	5	6
Conservative	Hugh Hunter (incumbent)	29.9	2,008					
SNP	Ian Cochrane (incumbent)	22.3	1,498					
Conservative	Margaret Toner (incumbent)	16.3	1,098	1,641				
Labour	Helen Moonie (incumbent)	13.3	895	932	990	1,000	1,255	1,615
SNP	John Wallace (Note: Sitting councillor for Ayr East.)	9.1	612	618	625	749	897	
Independent	Alasdair John Malcolm	9.1	611	649	719	726		
Electorate: 12,085 Valid: 6,722 Spoilt: 172 Quota: 1,345 Turnout: 55.1%

=== 2012 election ===
Prestwick - 4 seats
Party	Candidate	FPv%	Count				
Party	Candidate	FPv%	1	2	3	4	5
Labour	Helen Moonie (incumbent)	25.9	1,458				
SNP	Ian Cochrane	24.9	1,399				
Conservative	Hugh Hunter (incumbent)	23.1	1,296				
Conservative	Margaret Toner (incumbent)	15.9	892	933	941	1,089	1,154
SNP	John Wallace	8.0	448	513	754	760	806
Liberal Democrats	Allan MacBain	2.3	128	185	193	199	
Electorate: 12,238 Valid: 5,621 Spoilt: 102 Quota: 1,125 Turnout: 45.9%

=== 2007 election ===
Prestwick – 4 seats
Party	Candidate	FPv%	Count				
Party	Candidate	FPv%	1	2	3	4	5
SNP	Stan Fisher	28.1	2,062				
Conservative	Hugh Hunter	25.1	1,847				
Labour	Helen Moonie	16.7	1,227	1,350	1,364	???	???
Conservative	Margaret Toner	16.7	1,224	1,350	1,663		
Labour	George Watson	13.4	987	1,071	1,084	???	
Valid: 7,347 Quota: 1,470
