= Douglas Spencer-Nairn =

British Unionist politician

Lt-Colonel Sir Douglas Leslie Spencer Spencer-Nairn, 2nd Baronet (24 February 1906 – 8 November 1970) was a British Unionist politician in Scotland.

Spencer-Nairn was educated at Shrewsbury and Trinity Hall, Cambridge. In 1955, he was elected Member of Parliament for Central Ayrshire, defeating the Labour incumbent Archie Manuel. Spencer-Nairn held the seat until 1959, when it was regained by Manuel against the national trend.

He was the grandfather of Canadian actress Tara Spencer-Nairn through his younger son John Chaloner Spencer-Nairn.

Parliament of the United Kingdom
Preceded by Archie Manuel	Member of Parliament for Central Ayrshire; 1955–1959	Succeeded by Archie Manuel
Baronetage of the United Kingdom
Preceded by Robert Spencer-Nairn	Baronet (of Monimail, Fife); 1960–1970	Succeeded by Robert Spencer-Nairn
