= Kilwinning (ward) =

Electoral ward in North Ayrshire

- North Ayrshire
- Boundary of Kilwinning in North Ayrshire from 2017–2022.
- Population: 17,280 (2021)
- Electorate: 13,392 (2024)
- Major settlements: Kilwinning
- Scottish Parliament constituency: Cunninghame South
- Scottish Parliament region: West Scotland
- UK Parliament constituency: North Ayrshire and Arran; Central Ayrshire

Current ward
- Created: 2007
- Number of councillors: 4
- Councillor: Joe Cullinane (Labour)
- Councillor: Scott Davidson (SNP)
- Councillor: Donald Reid (Labour)
- Councillor: Mary Hume (Labour)
- Created from: Ardrossan North; Eglinton and Lawthorn; Garnock East; Irvine Landward; Kilwinning East; Kilwinning South; Kilwinning West; Stevenston North

Kilwinning is one of the nine wards used to elect members of the North Ayrshire council. Created in 2007, the ward elects four councillors using the single transferable vote electoral system and covers an area with a population of 17,280 people.

The ward is a Labour stronghold with the party winning half the seats at every election.

== Boundaries ==
The ward was created following the Fourth Statutory Reviews of Electoral Arrangements ahead of the 2007 Scottish local elections. As a result of the Local Governance (Scotland) Act 2004, local elections in Scotland would use the single transferable vote electoral system from 2007 onwards so Kilwinning was formed from an amalgamation of several previous first-past-the-post wards. It contained all of the former Kilwinning East and Kilwinning South wards, the majority of the former Eglinton and Lawthorn ward, the southern half of the former Kilwinning West ward, the northern half of the former Stevenston North ward, the rural southern part of the former Garnock East ward, part of the former Ardrossan North and a small part of the former Irvine Landward ward. The ward centres on the town of Kilwinning in central North Ayrshire. Its southern boundary is mostly formed by the A78 and it includes a rural area to the north and east of the town up to the border with East Ayrshire. The wards boundaries were unchanged following the Fifth Statutory Reviews of Electoral Arrangements and the 2019 Reviews of Electoral Arrangements.

== Councillors ==
Year	Councillors			
2007	John Ferguson (SNP)	Margaret McDougall (Labour)	Ryan Oldfather (Labour)	Andrew Scott Chamberlain (Liberal Democrats)
2012	John Ferguson (SNP)	Joe Cullinane (Labour)	Donald Reid (Labour)	Robert Steel (Ind.)
2017	Scott Davidson (SNP)	Joe Cullinane (Labour)	Donald Reid (Labour)	John Glover (Conservative)
2022	Scott Davidson (SNP)	Joe Cullinane (Labour)	Donald Reid (Labour)	John Glover (Conservative)
2024	Scott Davidson (SNP)	Joe Cullinane (Labour)	Donald Reid (Labour)	Mary Hume (Labour)

== Election results ==
=== 2024 by-election ===
Councillor John Glover who died in February 2024. Labour candidate Mary Hume gained the seat from the Conservatives.

Kilwinning by-election (9 May 2024) - 1 seat
Party	Candidate	FPv%	Count
Party	Candidate	FPv%	1
Labour	Mary Hume	53.8	2,171
SNP	Sheila Gibson	22.7	916
Conservative	Chris Lawler	15.3	619
Liberal Democrats	Ruby Kirkwood	3.8	154
Scottish Family	Ian Gibson	3.3	136
Electorate: 13,392 Valid: 3,996 Spoilt: 42 Quota: 1,999 Turnout: 30.2%

=== 2022 election ===
Kilwinning - 4 seats
Party	Candidate	FPv%	Count					
Party	Candidate	FPv%	1	2	3	4	5	6
Labour	Joe Cullinane (incumbent)	30.8	1,714					
SNP	Scott Davidson (incumbent)	22.0	1,225					
Conservative	John Glover (incumbent)	15.6	867	904	936	937	1,029	1,295
Labour	Donald Reid (incumbent)	15.1	842	1,297				
SNP	Sheila Gibson	12.8	714	750	780	886	944	
Liberal Democrats	Ruby Kirkwood	3.4	191	226	276	278		
Electorate: 13,553 Valid: 5,553 Spoilt: 171 Quota: 1,111 Turnout: 42.2%

=== 2017 election ===
Kilwinning - 4 seats
Party	Candidate	FPv%	Count					
Party	Candidate	FPv%	1	2	3	4	5	6
Labour	Joe Cullinane (incumbent)	33.9	1,949					
SNP	Scott Davidson	25.5	1,466					
Conservative	John Glover	21.3	1,224					
SNP	Susan Johnson	8.0	460	501	768	770	776	859
Labour	Donald Reid (incumbent)	7.00	402	1,011	1,019	1,041	1,073	1,152
Green	Yvonne McLellan	3.4	193	232	251	258	274	
UKIP	Matthew John Grainger	1.0	60	74	76	91		
Electorate: 13,420 Valid: 5,754 Spoilt: 151 Quota: 1,151 Turnout: 44.0%

=== 2012 election ===
Kilwinning - 4 seats
Party	Candidate	FPv%	Count										
Party	Candidate	FPv%	1	2	3	4	5	6	7	8	9	10	11
SNP	John Ferguson (incumbent)	29.2	1,440										
Labour	Joe Cullinane	21.3	1,054										
Independent	Robert Steel	14.1	695	720	722	735	754	771	946	966	1,092		
Labour	Donald Reid	10.6	525	533	548	548	557	559	590	867	909	929	1,012
Conservative	Scott Gallacher	7.3	363	369	370	372	373	385	398	407			
Labour	Helen Hainey	5.6	279	295	335	337	341	352	373				
Independent	Colin Hedley	5.1	254	268	270	293	299	319					
SNP	Iain Walker	3.0	148	489	490	490	501	511	532	547	568	581	
Liberal Democrats	Stuart Gardiner	1.7	82	88	90	90	90						
Scottish Socialist	Andy Jones	1.1	54	60	61	63							
Independent	Philip Hogg	0.9	45	47	47								
Electorate: 13,087 Valid: 4,939 Spoilt: 157 Quota: 988 Turnout: 37.7%

=== 2007 election ===
Kilwinning - 4 seats
Party	Candidate	FPv%	Count						
Party	Candidate	FPv%	1	2	3	4	5	6	7
SNP	John Ferguson	27.0	1,749						
Labour	Margaret McDougall	16.0	1,033	1,076	1,124	1,303			
Labour	Ryan Oldfather	13.5	872	901	921	1,136	1,142	1,226	1,306
Conservative	Gail Niven Allison	13.4	869	914	932	953	953	1,037	
Liberal Democrats	Andrew Scott Chamberlain	11.0	713	795	860	914	915	1,167	1,674
Labour	Donald J. Reid	7.9	513	525	553				
Independent	Leanne Dorans	7.2	468	536	608	642			
Solidarity	Sandy Clarke	3.9	255	322					
Electorate: 13,186 Valid: 6,472 Spoilt: 128 Quota: 1,295 Turnout: 50.0%
