= Margaret Burgess =

Scottish politician

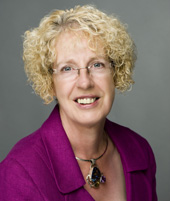

Minister for Housing and Welfare
- In office 5 September 2012 – 18 May 2016
- First Minister: Alex Salmond; Nicola Sturgeon
- Preceded by: Keith Brown

Member of the Scottish Parliament for Cunninghame South
- In office 5 May 2011 – 24 March 2016
- Preceded by: Irene Oldfather
- Succeeded by: Ruth Maguire

Personal details
- Born: 7 December 1949 (age 76) Ayrshire, Scotland
- Party: Scottish National Party

Margaret Jean Burgess (born 7 December 1949) is a former Scottish National Party (SNP) politician. She was the Minister for Housing and Welfare from 2012 to 2016, and the Member of the Scottish Parliament (MSP) for the Cunninghame South constituency from 2011 to 2016.

== Early life ==
Burgess was born on 7 December 1949 in Ayrshire, Scotland. She worked as a Citizens Advice manager in East Ayrshire.

== Political career ==
She was elected in the 2011 election.

On 5 September 2012 she was appointed as Minister for Housing and Welfare, a portfolio intended to reflect the important role of housing in aiding economic recovery and the challenges that face those in poverty. During her time in office, the Scottish Government remained on course to exceed its affordable homebuilding target and improvements were made to the planning system.

In June 2015, Burgess announced that she would retire from Holyrood at the 2016 election. She pledged "full support for whoever is selected" as the new SNP candidate for her seat, and said "I look forward to joining the new candidate on the campaign trail. On 18 May 2016 the housing and welfare junior ministerial briefs were reallocated as part of a Cabinet reshuffle.

Scottish Parliament
Preceded by Irene Oldfather	Member of the Scottish Parliament for Cunninghame South; 2011–2016	Succeeded by Ruth Maguire
