= 2007 North Ayrshire Council election =

North Ayrshire Council election

- 3 May 2007

All 30 seats to North Ayrshire Council 16 seats needed for a majority
	First party	Second party
	Lab	SNP
Party	Labour	SNP
Last election	21 seats, 44.0%	3 seats, 28.1%
Seats won	12	8
Seat change	▼9	▲5
Popular vote	17,666	16,081
Percentage	32.4%	29.5%
Swing	▼11.6	▲1.4
Council Leader before election
David O'Neill
Labour
Council Leader after election
David O'Neill
(Labour)
No overall control

Elections to North Ayrshire Council were held on 3 May 2007, the same day as the 31 other Scottish local government elections and the Scottish Parliament elections. The election was the first one using eight new wards created as a result of the Local Governance (Scotland) Act 2004, each ward will elect three or four councillors using the single transferable vote system form of proportional representation. The new wards replaced the 30 single-member wards which used the plurality (first past the post) system of election.

Labour lost overall control of the council but remained the largest party after winning 12 seats - down nine from the previous election. The Scottish National Party (SNP) became the second-largest party, overtaking the Conservatives, after gaining five seats to hold eight. The Conservatives lost two seats to hold three while the Liberal Democrats won seats in a North Ayrshire election for the only time after they returned two councillors. Five independent councillors were also elected.

== Election results ==
2007 North Ayrshire Council election result
Party	Seats	Gains	Losses	Net gain/loss	Seats %	Votes %	Votes	+/−
Labour	12	N/A	N/A	▼8	40.0	32.4	17,666	▼11.6
SNP	8	N/A	N/A	▲5	26.7	29.5	16,081	▲1.4
Independent	5	N/A	N/A	▲3	16.7	16.9	9,193	▲10.9
Conservative	3	N/A	N/A	▼2	10.0	13.5	7,330	▼5.6
Liberal Democrats	2	N/A	N/A	▲2	6.7	4.7	2,564	▲4.3
Solidarity	0	N/A	N/A	0	0.0	2.1	1,127	New
Socialist Labour	0	N/A	N/A	0	0.0	0.5	265	New
Scottish Socialist	0	N/A	N/A	0	0.0	0.5	261	▼1.9
Total	30						54,487	

== Ward results ==
=== Irvine West ===
Irvine West - 4 seats
Party	Candidate	FPv%	Count						
Party	Candidate	FPv%	1	2	3	4	5	6	7
SNP	Matt Brown	31.6	2,247						
Labour	Ian Clarkson	24.0	1,710						
Conservative	Pat McPhee	11.2	799	875	883	888	1,059	1,159	1,225
Labour	David O'Neill	10.9	776	829	881	899	979	1,077	1,726
Solidarity	Jim Byrne	7.3	517	695	708	738	830		
Labour	John McKay	7.1	508	573	711	748	844	999	
Liberal Democrats	Iain Rubie Dale	6.4	453	613	633	655			
Socialist Labour	Bobby Cochrane	1.5	103	141	152				
Electorate: 14,993 Valid: 7,113 Spoilt: 156 Quota: 1,423 Turnout: 48.5%

=== Irvine East ===
Irvine East - 4 seats
Party	Candidate	FPv%	Count						
Party	Candidate	FPv%	1	2	3	4	5	6	7
SNP	Joan Sturgeon	32.4	2,293						
Labour	Tom Barr	18.4	1,302	1,367	1,377	1,436			
Labour	Jane Gorman	12.0	851	909	916	977	990	1,076	
Labour	John Moffat	12.0	850	930	949	1,027	1,031	1,082	1,701
Conservative	Jane Belding	10.7	759	820	828	861	862		
Liberal Democrats	Ruby Kirkwood	7.7	543	690	718	864	865	1,197	1,314
Solidarity	Danny McGregor	5.0	355	489	578				
Scottish Socialist	Denise Morton	1.7	117	200					
Electorate: 14,852 Valid: 7,070 Spoilt: 150 Quota: 1,415 Turnout: 48.6%

=== Kilwinning ===
Kilwinning - 4 seats
Party	Candidate	FPv%	Count						
Party	Candidate	FPv%	1	2	3	4	5	6	7
SNP	John Ferguson	27.0	1,749						
Labour	Margaret McDougall	16.0	1,033	1,076	1,124	1,303			
Labour	Ryan Oldfather	13.5	872	901	921	1,136	1,142	1,226	1,306
Conservative	Gail Niven Allison	13.4	869	914	932	953	953	1,037	
Liberal Democrats	Andrew Scott Chamberlain	11.0	713	795	860	914	915	1,167	1,674
Labour	Donald J. Reid	7.9	513	525	553				
Independent	Leanne Dorans	7.2	468	536	608	642			
Solidarity	Sandy Clarke	3.9	255	322					
Electorate: 13,186 Valid: 6,472 Spoilt: 128 Quota: 1,295 Turnout: 50.0%

=== Saltcoats and Stevenston ===
Saltcoats and Stevenston - 4 seats
Party	Candidate	FPv%	Count						
Party	Candidate	FPv%	1	2	3	4	5	6	7
SNP	William Gibson	22.4	1,629						
Independent	Ronnie McNicol	18.8	1,362	1,380	1,577				
Labour	David Munn	13.0	943	951	968	978	1,045	1,344	1,531
Labour	Alan Munro	12.4	902	907	953	961	1,000	1,254	1,482
SNP	Nan Wallace	9.5	691	800	890	919	1,051	1,094	
Labour	Sam Taylor	9.4	683	685	709	714	743		
Conservative	Stewart Ferguson	7.6	554	557	594	619			
Independent	Margaret Walsh	6.8	496	501					
Electorate: 15,039 Valid: 7,260 Spoilt: 189 Quota: 1,453 Turnout: 49.5%

=== Ardrossan and Arran ===
Ardrossan and Arran - 4 seats
Party	Candidate	FPv%	Count								
Party	Candidate	FPv%	1	2	3	4	5	6	7	8	9
Independent	Margie Currie	19.3	1,439	1,456	1,478	1,582					
SNP	Tony Gurney	19.0	1,414	1,439	1,462	1,779					
Labour	Peter McNamara	13.5	1,007	1,019	1,033	1,051	1,085	1,094	1,763		
Independent	John Hunter	12.8	952	970	1,087	1,106	1,176	1,189	1,234	1,287	1,658
Conservative	Gordon Allison	11.5	857	866	872	886	914	930	963	989	
Labour	Margaret Munn	11.1	829	837	848	864	884	888			
SNP	William McLaren	7.7	573	589	597						
Independent	Kenneth MacDougall	3.1	228	237							
Scottish Socialist	Nigel Hunter	1.9	144								
Electorate: 13,448 Valid: 7,443 Spoilt: 146 Quota: 1,489 Turnout: 56.4%

=== Dalry and West Kilbride ===
Dalry and West Kilbride - 3 seats
Party	Candidate	FPv%	Count						
Party	Candidate	FPv%	1	2	3	4	5	6	7
Independent	Elizabeth McLardy	29.0	1,637						
Labour	John Reid	20.7	1,176	1,196	1,245	1,292	1,305	1,375	1,682
SNP	Catherine McMillan	19.1	1,084	1,117	1,157	1,198	1,209	1,261	
Conservative	Robert Barr (Note: Cllr Robert Barr quit the Conservatives on 24 June 2010 and became an independent.)	17.0	962	994	1,003	1,036	1,220	1,301	1,568
Conservative	Ian Richardson	4.3	242	252	256	266			
Independent	David Park	3.8	213	247	264	288	301		
Liberal Democrats	Susan Clark	3.1	174	190	198				
Socialist Labour	Louise McDaid	2.9	162	182					
Electorate: 9,796 Valid: 5,650 Spoilt: 66 Quota: 1,413 Turnout: 58.3%

=== Kilbirnie and Beith ===
Kilbirnie and Beith - 3 seats
Party	Candidate	FPv%	Count								
Party	Candidate	FPv%	1	2	3	4	5	6	7	8	9
SNP	Craig Taylor	23.4	1,329	1,349	1,366	1,397	1,450				
Labour	John Bell	23.1	1,313	1,324	1,337	1,373	1,382	1,386	1,467		
Independent	Jean Highgate	16.7	947	958	993	1,024	1,151	1,157	1,371	1,374	1,810
Labour	Donald Reid	15.0	849	854	856	878	930	933	986	1,019	
Conservative	John Smith	9.9	562	569	570	595	607	610			
Independent	John Johnstone	4.7	265	281	296	309					
Liberal Democrats	Jenny Hutton	3.3	188	191	197						
Independent	William Fyfe	2.0	116	123							
Independent	Iain Walker	1.9	106								
Electorate: 11,058 Valid: 5,675 Spoilt: 132 Quota: 1,419 Turnout: 52.5%

=== North Coast and Cumbraes ===
North Coast and Cumbraes - 4 seats
Party	Candidate	FPv%	Count							
Party	Candidate	FPv%	1	2	3	4	5	6	7	8
SNP	Alan Hill	30.2	2,357							
Labour	Alex Gallagher	19.8	1,549	1,608						
Conservative	Elisabethe Marshall	12.9	1,007	1,037	1,040	1,084	1,179	1,779		
Conservative	Tom Marshall	9.2	719	732	734	751	785			
SNP	Bobby Rae	9.2	715	1,194	1,201	1,259	1,389	1,429	1,457	1,832
Independent	Ian Murdoch	7.5	587	622	626	793	936	980	1,038	
Liberal Democrats	Lewis Hutton	6.3	493	548	559	617				
Independent	Gerard Langan	4.8	377	411	414					
Electorate: 13,519 Valid: 7,804 Spoilt: 174 Quota: 1,561 Turnout: 59.0%

== By-elections ==
=== 2008 Kilbirnie and Beith by-election ===
A by-election arose in the Kilbirnie and Beith ward following the death of the Scottish National Party's Craig Taylor, and Anthea Dickson held the seat for the SNP on 11 December 2008.

Kilbirnie and Beith by-election (11 December 2008) - 1 seat
Party	Candidate	FPv%	Count		
Party	Candidate	FPv%	1	2	3
SNP	Anthea Dickson	48.9	1,363	1,380	1,415
Labour	Gordon McKay	33.7	939	956	972
Conservative	Ted Nevill	11.6	322	324	342
Liberal Democrats	Lewis Hutton	3.4	94	104	
Socialist Labour	James McDaid	2.4	68		
Electorate: 11,232 Valid: 2,786 Spoilt: 20 Quota: 1,394 Turnout: 25.0%

=== 2011 Saltcoats and Stevenston by-election ===
A by-election arose in the Saltcoats and Stevenston ward following the resignation of the Labour Party's David Munn, and Jim Montgomorie held the seat for Labour on 25 August 2011.

Saltcoats and Stevenston by-election (25 August 2011) - 1 seat
Party	Candidate	FPv%	Count				
Party	Candidate	FPv%	1	2	3	4	5
Labour	Jim Montgomerie	48.7	1,914	1,927	1,936	1,963	2,039
SNP	Nan Wallace	33.2	1,306	1,311	1,326	1,363	1,425
Conservative	Chris Barr	7.2	284	286	297	308	331
Scottish Senior Citizens	Jimmy Miller	5.4	211	217	222	240	
Independent	Gerard Pollock	2.9	114	117	123		
Liberal Democrats	Gordon Bain	1.4	56	57			
Socialist Labour	Louise McDaid	1.1	43				
Electorate: 11,039 Valid: 2,764 Spoilt: 42 Quota: 1,965 Turnout: 25.4%
