= North Ayrshire =

Council area of Scotland

North Ayrshire: Siorrachd Àir a Tuath (Scottish Gaelic); North Ayrshire (Scots)
- Council area
- Coat of arms
- Motto: Sense and Worth
- North Ayrshire shown within Scotland
- Coordinates: 55°40′N 4°47′W
- Sovereign state: United Kingdom
- Country: Scotland
- Lieutenancy area: Ayrshire and Arran
- District: 1975
- Unitary authority: 1 April 1996
- Administrative HQ: Irvine

Government
  - Type: Council
  - Body: North Ayrshire Council
  - Control: No overall control
  - MPs: 2 MPs: Irene Campbell (L); Alan Gemmell (L)
  - MSPs: 2 MSPs: Ruth Maguire (SNP); Kenneth Gibson (SNP)

Area
  - Total: 342 sq mi (885 km^{2})
  - Rank: 17th

Population (2025)
  - Total: 133,660
  - Rank: 15th
  - Density: 390/sq mi (151/km^{2})
- Time zone: UTC+0 (GMT)
  - Summer (DST): UTC+1 (BST)
- ISO 3166 code: GB-NAY
- GSS code: S12000021
- Website: north-ayrshire.gov.uk

North Ayrshire (Scottish Gaelic: Siorrachd Àir a Tuath, pronounced [ˈʃirˠəxk aːɾʲ ə ˈt̪ʰuə]) is one of 32 council areas in Scotland. The council area borders Inverclyde to the north, Renfrewshire and East Renfrewshire to the northeast, and East Ayrshire and South Ayrshire to the east and south respectively. The local authority is North Ayrshire Council, formed in 1996 with the same boundaries as the district of Cunninghame, which existed from 1975 to 1996.

Located in the west central Lowlands with the Firth of Clyde to its west, the council area covers the northern portion of the historic county of Ayrshire, in addition to the islands of Arran and The Cumbraes from the historic county of Buteshire. North Ayrshire had an estimated population of 133,660 in 2025. Its largest towns are Irvine and Kilwinning. From 1975 to 1996 under the name Cunninghame it was one of nineteen local government districts in the Strathclyde region.

== History ==
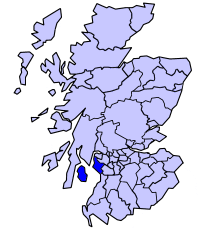
the district in Strathclyde

The local government district was formed as Cunninghame in 1975 under the Local Government (Scotland) Act 1973, which established a two-tier structure of local government across Scotland comprising upper-tier regions and lower-tier districts. Cunninghame was one of nineteen districts created within the region of Strathclyde. The district covered the whole area of three former districts from the historic county of Buteshire and nine former districts from Ayrshire, plus small parts of a further two districts within the designated area for Irvine New Town:

- Ardrossan Burgh
- Arran District
- Ayr District (part within designated area of Irvine New Town)
- Cumbrae District
- Irvine Burgh
- Irvine District
- Kilbirnie District
- Kilmarnock District (part within designated area of Irvine New Town)
- Kilwinning Burgh
- Millport Burgh
- Largs Burgh
- Saltcoats Burgh
- Stevenston Burgh
- West Kilbride District

Arran, Cumbrae and Millport were from Buteshire, the rest were from Ayrshire.

Cunninghame district was abolished in 1996 by the Local Government etc. (Scotland) Act 1994 which replaced regions and districts with unitary council areas. North Ayrshire council area was formed with identical boundaries to Cunninghame District. The name Cunninghame is still used for two constituencies in the Scottish Parliament, namely Cunninghame North and Cunninghame South.

North Ayrshire Council was created as part of the 1996 reforms; as well as taking over the functions of the abolished Cunninghame District Council, it also took on the functions of the abolished Strathclyde Regional Council within the area. The area's name references its location within the historic county of Ayrshire, which had been abolished for local government purposes in 1975 when Cunninghame district and Strathclyde region had been created, although the islands of Arran and The Cumbraes had been in Buteshire prior to 1975. North Ayrshire forms part of the Ayrshire and Arran lieutenancy area.

== Demography ==
=== Languages ===
The 2022 Scottish Census reported that out of 130,134 residents aged three and over, 49,833 (38.3%) considered themselves able to speak or read the Scots language.

The 2022 Scottish Census reported that out of 130,127 residents aged three and over, 1,099 (0.8%) considered themselves able to speak or read Gaelic.

== Geography ==
The council headquarters are located in Irvine, which is North Ayrshire's largest town. The area also contains the towns of Ardrossan, Beith, Dalry, Irvine, Kilbirnie, Kilwinning, Largs, Saltcoats, Skelmorlie, Stevenston, West Kilbride, as well as the Isle of Arran and Great and Little Cumbrae. The Isle of Arran covers nearly half of the council area's territory, but is home to less than 4% of the population. North Ayrshire is known for its rural countryside, coastlines, beaches and landmarks.

The towns in the north of the area, Skelmorlie, Largs, Fairlie and West Kilbride are affluent commuting towns and with them being on the coast, are very popular with tourists during the summer months. Towns in the south include Ardrossan, Saltcoats and Stevenston. Towards the south of the area is Kilwinning and Irvine, the main settlement and largest town in the area. The inland towns of Dalry, Kilbirnie and Beith were steel towns with large steel mills, but these are long gone. Tourism is the main industry on Arran and Cumbrae; however, the number of holiday homes on the latter has begun to squeeze locals out of the housing market. Regeneration is currently taking place at Ardrossan Harbour and Irvine town centre, and there has been a rapid increase in the construction of new housing in recent years.

Kelburn Castle, Fairlie, is the home of the 10th Earl of Glasgow, Patrick Robin Archibald Boyle. The grounds have belonged to the Boyle family since the 1100s. In 2007, the castle was transformed by the Graffiti Project.

== Economy ==
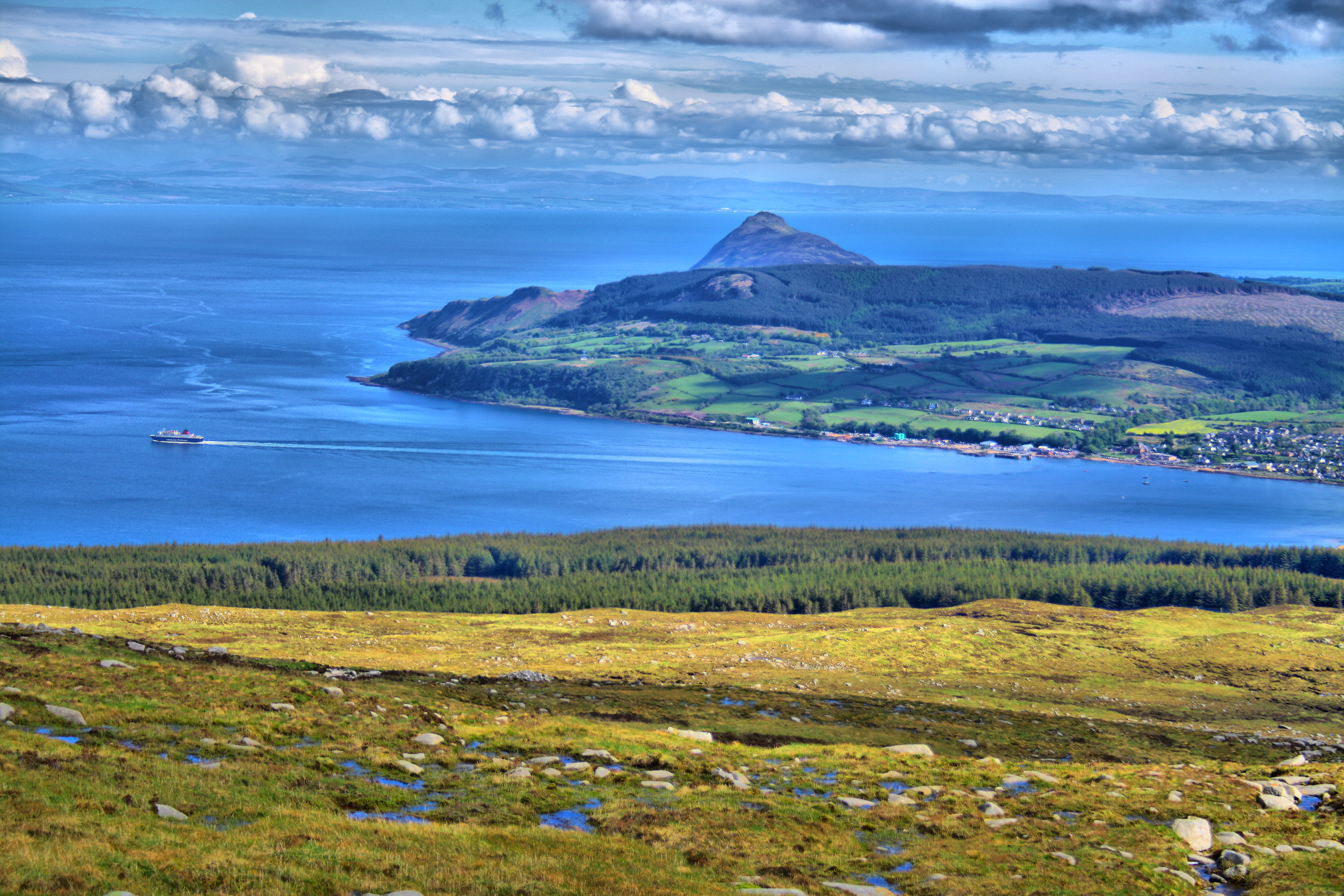
Brodick, a settlement in North Ayrshire on the Isle of Arran.

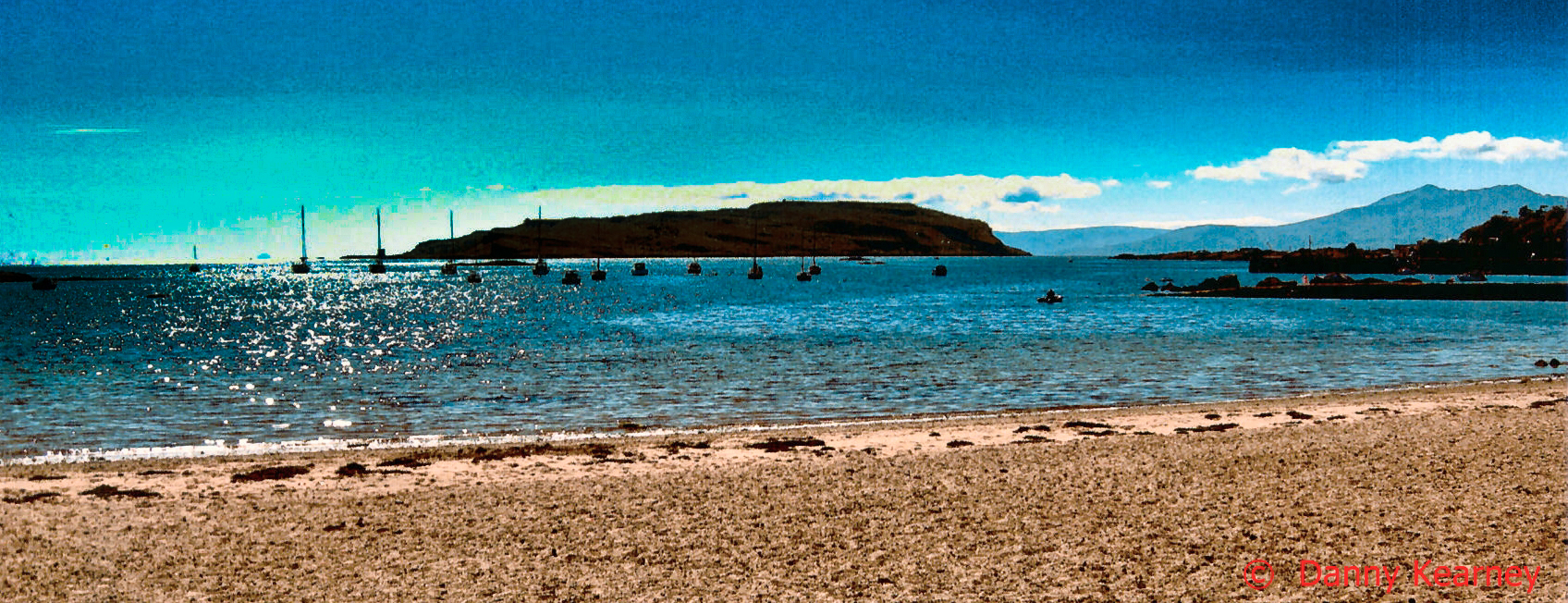
A view from Millport. Tourism, particularly in the islands, is a strong sector of North Ayrshire's economy.

- Maximising renewable energy generation using the council's land assets.
- The creation of a new Green Jobs Fund to ensure a just transition for North Ayrshire.
- Investing in commercial estate including improving sustainability.
- Tackling vacant and derelict land and buildings in town centres.
- Supporting community economic development including through community regeneration and ownership.
- A tree-planting programme to support carbon absorption.

In May 2020, North Ayrshire Council became the first council in Scotland to become a Community Wealth Building (CWB) Council, setting out a new economic model focused on wellbeing and inclusion. North Ayrshire Council seeks to use Community Wealth Building objectives to support the recovery and renewal of North Ayrshire by creating an economy that works for people, place and planet.

The North Ayrshire approach will see the creation of a new £660,000 Community Wealth Building Business Fund to provide assistance to local business and facilitate the development of co-operatives, employee ownership and social enterprises. The aim is to support local supply chains, fair employment, digital adoption and the transition to a green economy. North Ayrshire is to benefit from the Ayrshire Growth Deal, an economic plan created by both the Scottish Government and UK Government. The £250 million Ayrshire Growth Deal is also central to the plans to support economic recovery through an investment programme to create and secure jobs within the area of North Ayrshire.

== Education ==
Education in North Ayrshire is provided by North Ayrshire Council, the local authority responsible for the area. Education is provided to children in the area through early years centres, primary schools, secondary schools, home schooling and additional support need facilities. There are currently ten secondary schools in North Ayrshire, all under the responsibility of North Ayrshire Council – Ardrossan Academy, Arran High School, Auchenharvie Academy, Garnock Community Campus, Greenwood Academy, Irvine Royal Academy, Kilwinning Academy, Largs Academy, Lockhart Campus and St Matthew's Academy.

== Governance ==
North Ayrshire Council Comhairle Siorrachd Àir a Tuath
- Council logo

Leadership
- Provost: Anthea Dickson, SNP since 18 May 2022
- Leader: Tony Gurney, SNP since 11 February 2026
- Chief Executive: Craig Hatton since October 2018

Structure
- Seats: 33 councillors
- Graph of the party split among 33 seats.
- Political groups: Administration (12) SNP (12) Other parties (21) Labour (11) Conservative (5) Reform (2) Independent (3)

Elections
- Voting system: Single transferable vote
- Last election: 6 May 2022
- Next election: 6 May 2027

Meeting place
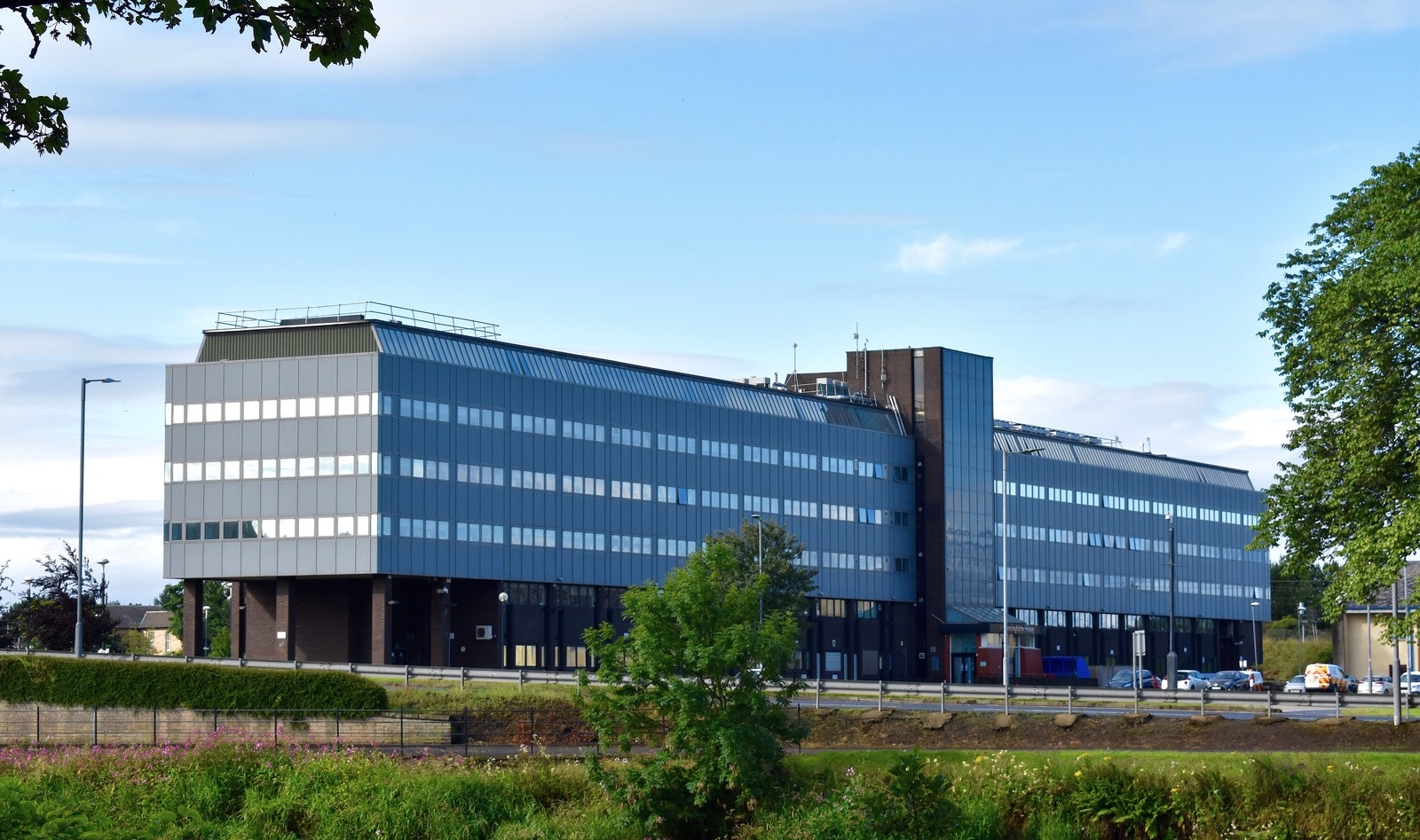
- Cunninghame House, Friars Croft, Irvine, KA12 8EE

Website
- www.north-ayrshire.gov.uk

Map of the council area's electoral wards, as of 2017

=== Political control ===
The council has been under no overall control since 2007, with various minority administrations led by both Labour and the Scottish National Party (SNP) operating since then. Following the 2022 election the council is under no overall control, being led by an SNP minority administration.

The first election to Cunningham District Council was held in 1974, initially operating as a shadow authority alongside the outgoing authorities until it came into its powers on 16 May 1975. A shadow authority for the replacement North Ayrshire Council was similarly elected in 1995 ahead of the reforms which took effect on 1 April 1996. Political control of the two councils from 1975 was as follows:

Cunningham District Council

Party in control	Years
Labour	1975–1977
No overall control	1977–1980
Labour	1980–1996

North Ayrshire Council

Party in control	Years
Labour	1996–2007
No overall control	2007–

=== Leadership ===
The leaders of the council since 1996 have been:

Councillor	Party	From	To
Jimmy Clements	Labour	1 Apr 1996	May 1999
David O'Neill	Labour	14 May 1999	May 2012
Willie Gibson	SNP	16 May 2012	30 Aug 2016
Joe Cullinane	Labour	30 Aug 2016	May 2022
Marie Burns	SNP	18 May 2022	11 Feb 2026
Tony Gurney	SNP	11 Feb 2026	

=== Composition ===
Following the 2022 election, and subsequent by-elections and changes of allegiance up to October 2026, the composition of the council was:

Party	Seats
SNP	12
Labour	11
Conservative	5
Reform	2
Independent	3
Total	33

The next election is due in 2027.

=== Elections ===
Since 2007 elections have been held every five years under the single transferable vote system, introduced by the Local Governance (Scotland) Act 2004. Election results since 1995 have been as follows:

Year	Seats	SNP	Conservative	Labour	Liberal Democrats	Independent / Other	Notes
1995	30	1	1	28	0	0	Labour majority
1999	30	2	2	25	0	1	New ward boundaries. Labour majority
2003	30	3	4	22	0	1	Labour majority
2007	30	8	3	12	2	5	New ward boundaries.
2012	30	12	1	11	0	6	
2017	33	11	7	11	0	4	New ward boundaries.
2022	33	12	10	9	0	2	New ward boundaries. SNP minority administration

=== Premises ===
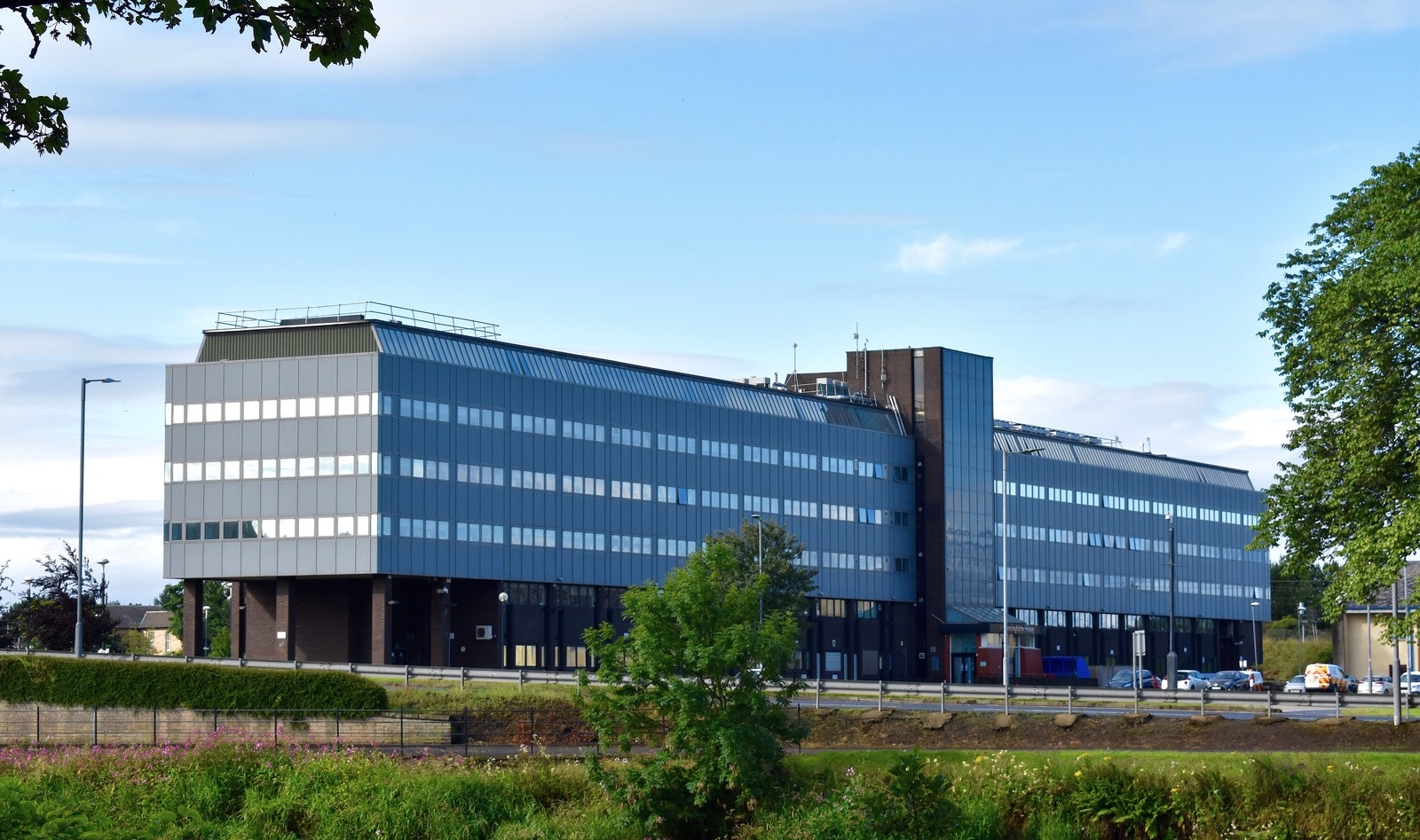
Cunningham House, Friars Croft, Irvine

North Ayrshire Council is based at Cunninghame House on Friars Croft in Irvine, which was purpose-built for its predecessor Cunninghame District Council and completed in 1975, forming part of the new town centre for Irvine following its designation as a New Town. Following the district's abolition in 1996 the building has been the headquarters of North Ayrshire Council.

=== Wards ===
As of 2022, the council area is divided into nine multi-member wards returning 33 members, composed as follows:

Ward Number	Ward Name	Seats
1	North Coast	5
2	Garnock Valley	5
3	Ardrossan	3
4	Arran	1
5	Saltcoats and Stevenston	5
6	Kilwinning	4
7	Irvine West	4
8	Irvine East	3
9	Irvine South	3

=== Wider politics ===
At the House of Commons, North Ayrshire is covered by the Central Ayrshire and North Ayrshire and Arran Parliamentary constituencies, both of which are represented by MPs belonging to the Scottish Labour Party. In the Scottish Parliament, the council area is divided into Cunninghame North and Cunninghame South, both represented by MSPs from the Scottish National Party. The council has been a member of the Islands Forum since 2022.

== Settlements ==
The largest settlements in North Ayrshire.

The main administration centre and largest settlement in North Ayrshire is Irvine, a new town on the coast of the Firth of Clyde. The second biggest settlement is Kilwinning, followed by Saltcoats which is part of the 'Three Towns' - Ardrossan, Saltcoats and Stevenston.

On the Isle of Arran, the largest village is Lamlash and there are numerous smaller villages. On Great Cumbrae, the only town on the island is Millport.

Largest settlements by population:

Settlement	Population (2020)
Irvine	34,130
Kilwinning	16,100
Saltcoats	12,250
Largs	11,030
Ardrossan	10,500
Stevenston	9,050
Kilbirnie	7,170
Beith	5,940
Dalry	5,250
West Kilbride	4,860

=== Towns (mainland) ===
- Ardrossan
- Beith
- Dalry
- Irvine
- Kilbirnie
- Kilwinning
- Largs
- Saltcoats
- Stevenston
- West Kilbride

=== Villages (mainland) ===
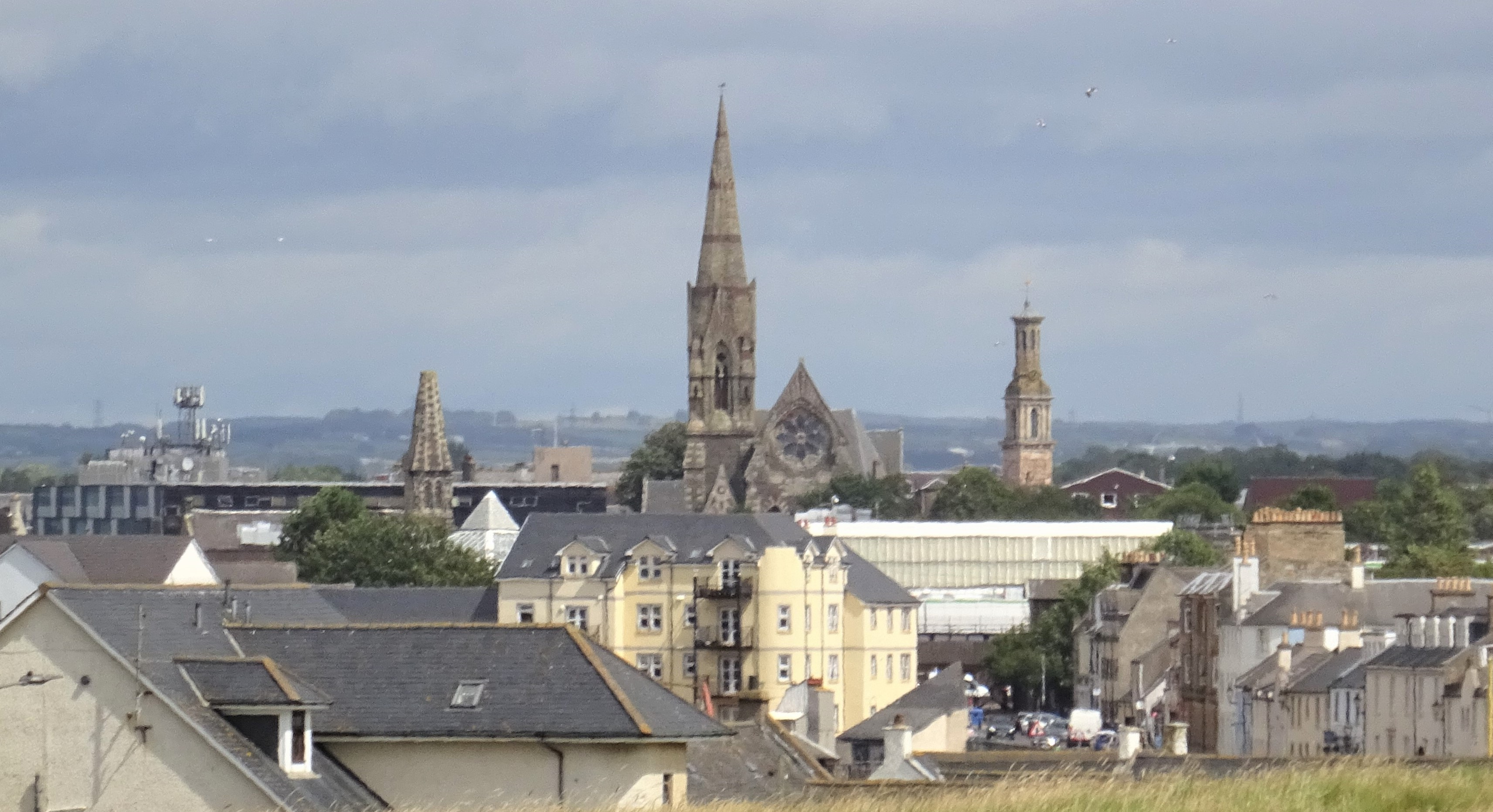
Irvine is the most populous town and the administrative centre for North Ayrshire Council

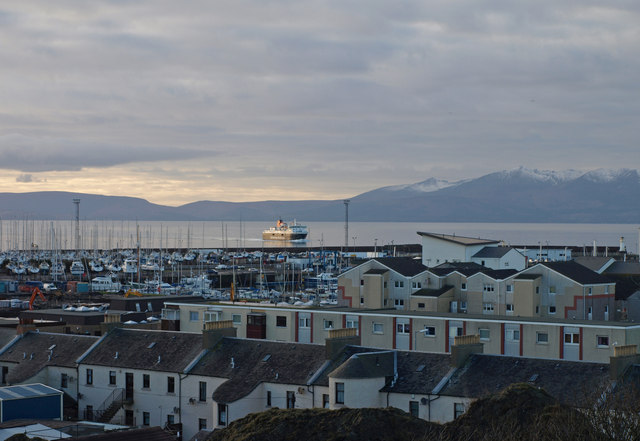
Ardrossan is one of the largest towns in North Ayrshire by population

- Ardeer
- Auchentiber
- Barrmill
- Benslie
- Dreghorn
- Drybridge
- Fairlie
- Gateside
- Girdle Toll
- Glengarnock
- Longbar
- Skelmorlie
- Springside
- Stanecastle

=== Suburbs (mainland) ===
- Barkip
- Broomlands
- Bourtreehill
- Burnhouse
- Castlepark
- Crosbie
- Chapeltoun
- Cunninghamhead
- Dalgarven
- Drakemyre
- Eglinton
- Fergushill
- Fullarton
- Giffordland
- Greenhills
- Hessilhead hamlet
- Highfield
- Hunterston
- Kelburn
- Lawthorn
- Lylestone
- Meigle
- Meikle Auchengree
- Montgreenan
- Nettlehirst
- Perceton
- Portencross
- Routenburn
- Seamill
- Sevenacres
- Shewalton
- Torranyard

=== Villages (Isle of Arran) ===
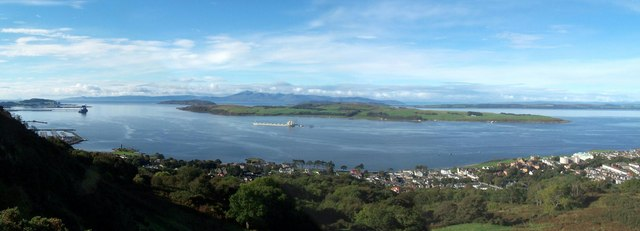
Great Cumbrae as seen from Largs

- Blackwaterfoot
- Brodick
- Catacol
- Cladach
- Corrie
- Dippen
- Kildonan
- Kilmory
- Lagg
- Lamlash
- Lochranza
- Machrie
- Pirnmill
- Sannox
- Shiskine
- Sliddery
- Whitefarland
- Whiting Bay

=== Settlements (Great Cumbrae) ===
- Millport

== Coat of arms ==
Cunninghame District Council was granted a coat of arms by Lord Lyon King of Arms in 1979. The main feature of the arms was a black "shakefork" from the arms of Clan Cunningham. To the left was the arms of the former royal burgh of Irvine, based on the crest of the royal arms of Scotland, and said to have been granted to the town by King David I. To the right was an ancient ship which had appeared in the arms of both Bute County Council and Arran District Council. Above the shakefork was a leopard's head holding in its mouth a weaver's shuttle, representing the weaving industry of the inland parts of the district. Such an emblem appeared in Scottish arms grants to weaving societies and associations, and in the armorial bearings of the Worshipful Company of Weavers of the City of London. The motto was Sense and Worth, and the arms were completed by a gold coronet of a design reserved by Lord Lyon to district councils, topped by thistle-heads.

== Places of interest ==
- Kelburn Castle
- Barrmill Park
- Clyde Muirshiel Regional Park
- Eglinton Country Park, Irvine
- Eglinton Tournament Bridge
- Irvine Harbour
- Spier's Old School Grounds
