= Cunninghame South (Scottish Parliament constituency) =

Region or constituency of the Scottish Parliament

- County constituency for the Scottish Parliament
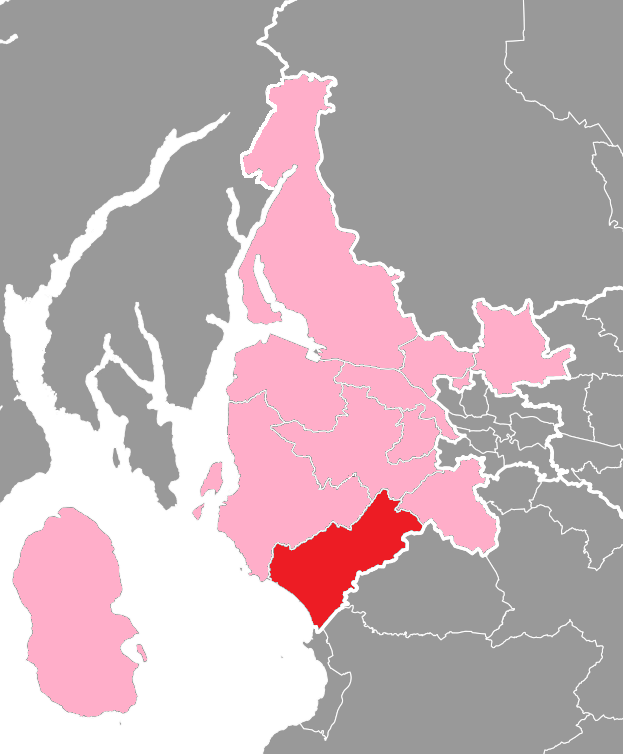

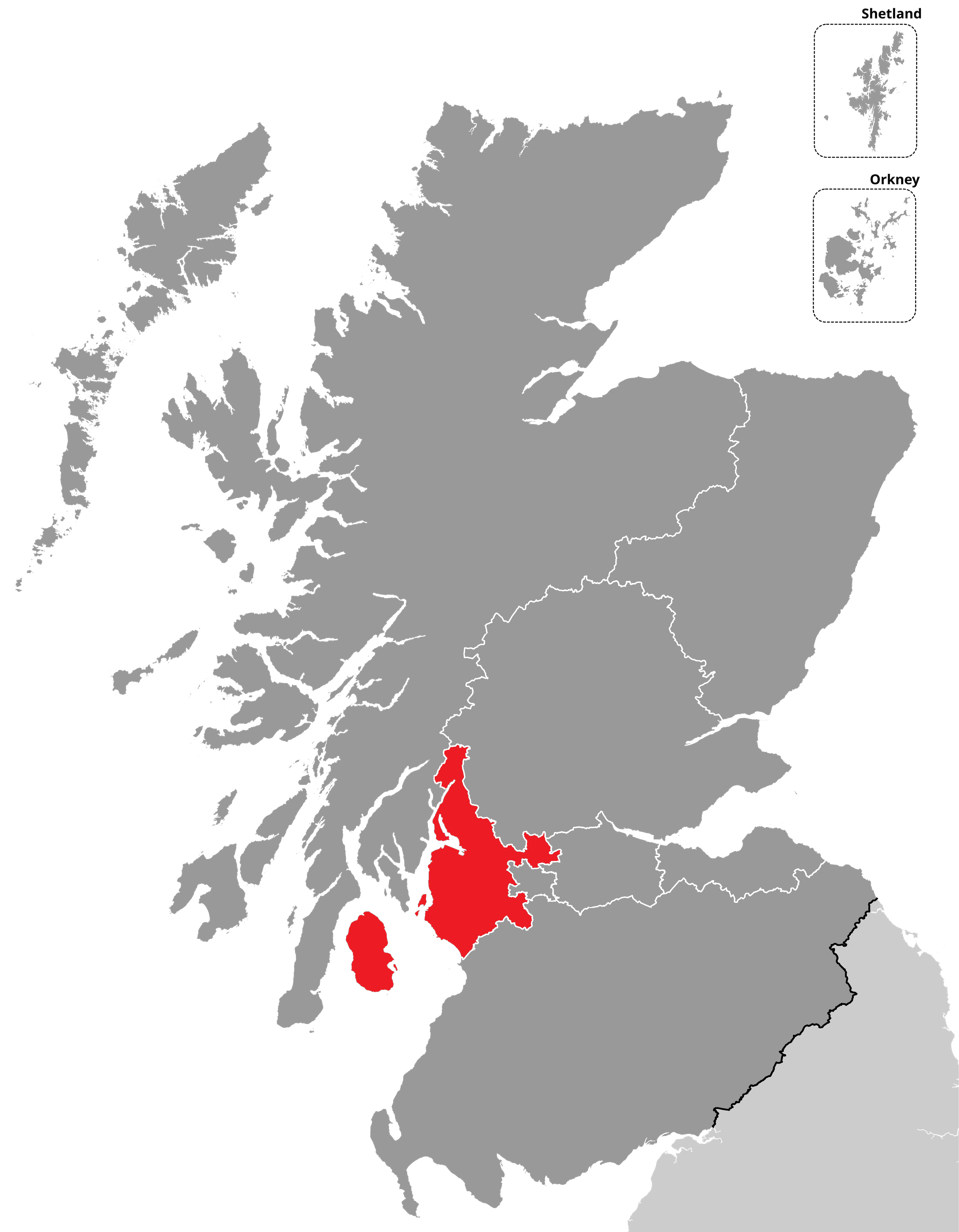
- Cunninghame South shown within the West Scotland electoral region and the region shown within Scotland
- Electoral region: West Scotland
- Electorate: 60,254 (2026)

Current constituency
- Created: 1999
- Party: Scottish National Party
- MSP: Patricia Gibson
- Council area: North Ayrshire, East Ayrshire

Cunninghame South (Gaelic: Coineagan a Deas) is a county constituency of the Scottish Parliament covering part of the council areas of North Ayrshire and East Ayrshire. Under the additional-member electoral system used for elections to the Scottish Parliament, it elects one Member of the Scottish Parliament (MSP) by the first past the post method of election. It is also one of ten constituencies in the West Scotland electoral region, which elects seven additional members, in addition to the ten constituency MSPs, to produce a form of proportional representation for the region as a whole.

The seat has been held by Ruth Maguire of the Scottish National Party (SNP) since the 2016 Scottish Parliament election.

== Electoral region ==
The other nine constituencies of the West Scotland region are: Clydebank and Milngavie, Cunninghame North, Dumbarton, Eastwood, Inverclyde, Paisley, Renfrewshire North and Cardonald, Renfrewshire West and Levern Valley, and Strathkelvin and Bearsden. The region covers the whole of the council areas of East Dunbartonshire, East Renfrewshire, Inverclyde, North Ayrshire, Renfrewshire, and West Dunbartonshire; and parts of the council areas of Argyll and Bute, East Ayrshire, and Glasgow.

Prior to the first periodic review of Scottish Parliament boundaries in 2011, Cunninghame South was placed within the South of Scotland region. The other eight constituencies in this region during this period were: Ayr, Carrick, Cumnock and Doon Valley, Clydesdale, Dumfries, East Lothian, Galloway and Upper Nithsdale, Roxburgh and Berwickshire, and Tweeddale, Ettrick and Lauderdale.

== Constituency boundaries and council area ==
Map of boundaries (2011-2025)

Cunninghame South was created at the same time as the Scottish Parliament, in 1999, using the name and boundaries of an existing UK Parliament constituency. In 2005 Scottish constituencies for the UK House of Commons were mostly replaced with new constituencies, causing UK and Scottish parliamentary constituencies to no longer correspond. Following their First Periodic review into constituencies to the Scottish Parliament in time for the 2011 Scottish Parliament election, the Boundary Commission for Scotland altered the boundaries of the constituency. It was further altered by the Second Periodic Review of Scottish Parliament Boundaries in 2025 ahead of the 2026 Scottish Parliament election, with the villages of Dunlop and Stewarton being added from the Kilmarnock and Irvine Valley constituency in order to address differences in electorate size between the two seats.

The constituency is one of two in North Ayrshire, with the rest of the council area being covered by the Cunninghame North constituency. Following the 2025 review, it also includes parts of East Ayrshire; the remainder of East Ayrshire is covered by the Carrick, Cumnock and Doon Valley and Kilmarnock and Irvine Valley constituencies.

The electoral wards of East Ayrshire Council and North Ayrshire Council used in the current creation of Cunninghame South are:

- North Ayrshire:
  - Irvine West
  - Irvine East
  - Kilwinning
  - Irvine South
  - Saltcoats and Stevenston (shared with Cunninghame North)
- East Ayrshire:
  - Annick (shared with Kilmarnock and Irvine Valley)

== Constituency profile and voting patterns ==
=== Constituency profile ===
The Cunninghame South constituency occupies the southern portion of the North Ayrshire Council area, covering the towns of Kilwinning, Stevenston and Irvine. The part of the constituency lying in East Ayrshire is mostly made up of farmlands, with the historic town of Stewarton lying directly north of Kilmarnock along the Annick Water.

=== Voting patterns ===
The area has traditionally been represented by the Labour Party, with Labour continuously representing the Central Ayrshire and Cunninghame South constituencies at the British Parliament from 1959 until 2015 - when the constituency of Central Ayrshire was won by the Scottish National Party on a 27.7% swing from Labour to SNP. In the Scottish Parliament Cunninghame South was represented by the Labour Party from the establishment of the Scottish Parliament in 1999 until 2011, when the seat was gained by the SNP on a 9.9% swing.

== Member of the Scottish Parliament ==
Election	Member	Party
1999	Irene Oldfather	Labour
2011	Margaret Burgess	SNP
2016	Ruth Maguire	SNP
2026	Patricia Gibson	SNP

== Election results ==

=== 2020s ===
2026 Scottish Parliament election: Cunninghame South (Note: Note that changes in vote share are shown with respect to the notional result of the 2021 election, calculated to account for boundary changes)
Party	Candidate	Constituency			Regional		
Party	Candidate	Votes	%	±%	Votes	%	±%
SNP	Patricia Gibson	11,375	38.8	▼10.8	8,464	28.8	
Labour	Katy Clark (Note: Incumbent member on the party list, or for another constituency)	7,208	24.6	▼0.4	5,590	19.0	
Reform	Matthew McLean	7,049	24.1	New	7,040	23.9	
Conservative	Maurice Corry	2,222	7.6	▼14.4	2,540	8.6	
Green					3,023	10.3	
Liberal Democrats	Emma Farthing	1,442	4.9	▲2.4	1,189	4.0	
AtLS					278	0.9	
Independent Green Voice					235	0.8	
Scottish Family					198	0.7	
Socialist Labour					178	0.6	
ISP					161	0.5	
Scottish Socialist					121	0.4	
Liberal					112	0.4	
Independent	William Wallace				87	0.3	
ADF					49	0.2	
UKIP					49	0.2	
Independent	Paddy McCarthy				39	0.1	
Scottish Common Party					30	0.1	
Scottish Libertarian					28	0.1	
Independent	Paul Mack				9	0.0	
Majority		4,326	14.8				
Valid votes		29,296			29,420		
Invalid votes		129			92		
Turnout		29,425	48.8		29,420	49.0	
SNP hold		Swing		▼5.2			
Notes

2021 Scottish Parliament election: Cunninghame South
Party	Candidate	Constituency			Regional		
Party	Candidate	Votes	%	±%	Votes	%	±%
SNP	Ruth Maguire (Note: Incumbent member for this constituency)	15,208	50.5	▼1.7	13,895	46.0	▼3.8
Labour	Louise McPhater	7,256	24.1	▼6.0	6,352	21.0	▼3.4
Conservative	David Rocks	6,621	22.0	▲6.7	6,620	21.9	▲6.0
Green					1,244	4.1	▲0.8
Liberal Democrats	Tom Armstrong	715	2.4	0.0	579	1.9	▲0.3
Alba					417	1.4	New
All for Unity					367	1.2	New
Independent	Maurice Campbell	318	1.1	New	69	0.2	New
Scottish Family					160	0.5	New
Independent Green Voice					150	0.5	New
Abolish the Scottish Parliament					98	0.3	New
Freedom Alliance (UK)					60	0.2	New
Reform					53	0.2	New
UKIP					50	0.2	▼2.2
TUSC					46	0.2	New
Scottish Libertarian					38	0.1	0.0
Independent	James Morrison				13	0.0	New
Renew					11	0.0	New
Scotia Future					6	0.0	New
Majority		7,952	26.4	▲4.3			
Valid votes		30,118			30,228		
Invalid votes		96			54		
Turnout		30,214	58.0	▲6.6	30,282	58.2	▲6.7
SNP hold		Swing					

=== 2010s ===
2016 Scottish Parliament election: Cunninghame South
Party	Candidate	Constituency			Region		
Party	Candidate	Votes	%	±%	Votes	%	±%
SNP	Ruth Maguire	13,416	52.2	▲2.4	12,858	49.8	▲0.3
Labour	Joe Cullinane	7,723	30.1	▼9.1	6,308	24.4	▼11.0
Conservative	Billy McClure	3,940	15.3	▲6.8	4,105	15.9	▲8.0
Green					855	3.3	▲1.4
UKIP					628	2.4	▲1.7
Liberal Democrats	Ruby Kirkwood	616	2.4	▼0.1	417	1.6	▼0.1
Solidarity					254	1.0	▲0.8
Scottish Christian					177	0.7	▼0.1
RISE					168	0.7	New
Scottish Libertarian					30	0.1	New
Majority		5,693	22.1	▲11.5			
Valid votes		25,695			25,800		
Invalid votes		103			39		
Turnout		25,798	51.4	▲7.9	25,839	51.5	▲8.0
SNP hold		Swing					

2011 Scottish Parliament election: Cunninghame South
Party	Candidate	Constituency			Region		
Party	Candidate	Votes	%	±%	Votes	%	±%
SNP	Margaret Burgess	10,993	49.8	N/A	10,763	49.5	N/A
Labour	Irene Oldfather	8,645	39.2	N/A	7,197	33.1	N/A
Conservative	Alistair Haw	1,871	8.5	N/A	1,755	7.9	N/A
All-Scotland Pensioners Party					453	2.0	N/A
Green					424	1.9	N/A
Liberal Democrats	Ruby Kirkwood	547	2.5	N/A	374	1.7	N/A
Socialist Labour					257	1.2	N/A
BNP					238	1.1	N/A
Scottish Christian					173	0.8	N/A
UKIP					161	0.7	N/A
Scottish Socialist					115	0.5	N/A
Ban Bankers Bonuses					85	0.4	N/A
Pirate					62	0.3	N/A
Solidarity					34	0.2	N/A
Independent	Richard Vassie				17	0.1	N/A
Majority		2,384	10.6	N/A			
Valid votes		22,056			22,108		
Invalid votes		80			67		
Turnout		50,926	43.5	N/A	50,926	43.5	N/A
SNP win (new boundaries)							

=== 2000s ===
2007 Scottish Parliament election: Cunninghame South
Party	Candidate	Votes	%	±%
Labour	Irene Oldfather	10,270	43.8	−5.2
SNP	Duncan Ross	8,102	34.6	+12.2
Conservative	Pat McPhee	3,073	13.1	+2.8
Liberal Democrats	Iain Dale	1,977	8.4	+1.8
Majority		2,168	9.2	−17.6
Turnout		23,422	46.9	+1.2
Labour hold		Swing		

2003 Scottish Parliament election: Cunninghame South
Party	Candidate	Votes	%	±%
Labour	Irene Oldfather	11,165	49.0	−3.8
SNP	Mike Russell	5,089	22.4	−7.3
Scottish Socialist	Rosemary Byrne	2,677	11.8	New
Conservative	Andrew Brocklehurst	2,336	10.3	−1.1
Liberal Democrats	Iain Dale	1,505	6.6	+0.5
Majority		6,076	26.6	+3.5
Turnout		22,772	45.7	−10.4
Labour hold		Swing		

=== 1990s ===
1999 Scottish Parliament election: Cunninghame South
Party	Candidate	Votes	%	±%
Labour	Irene Oldfather	14,936	52.8	N/A
SNP	Mike Russell	8,395	29.7	N/A
Conservative	Murray Tosh	3,229	11.4	N/A
Liberal Democrats	Stuart Ritchie	1,717	6.1	N/A
Majority		6,541	23.1	N/A
Turnout		28,277	56.1	N/A
Labour win (new seat)				

== See also ==
- Cunninghame South (UK Parliament constituency)
