= Irene Oldfather =

Scottish politician (born 1954)

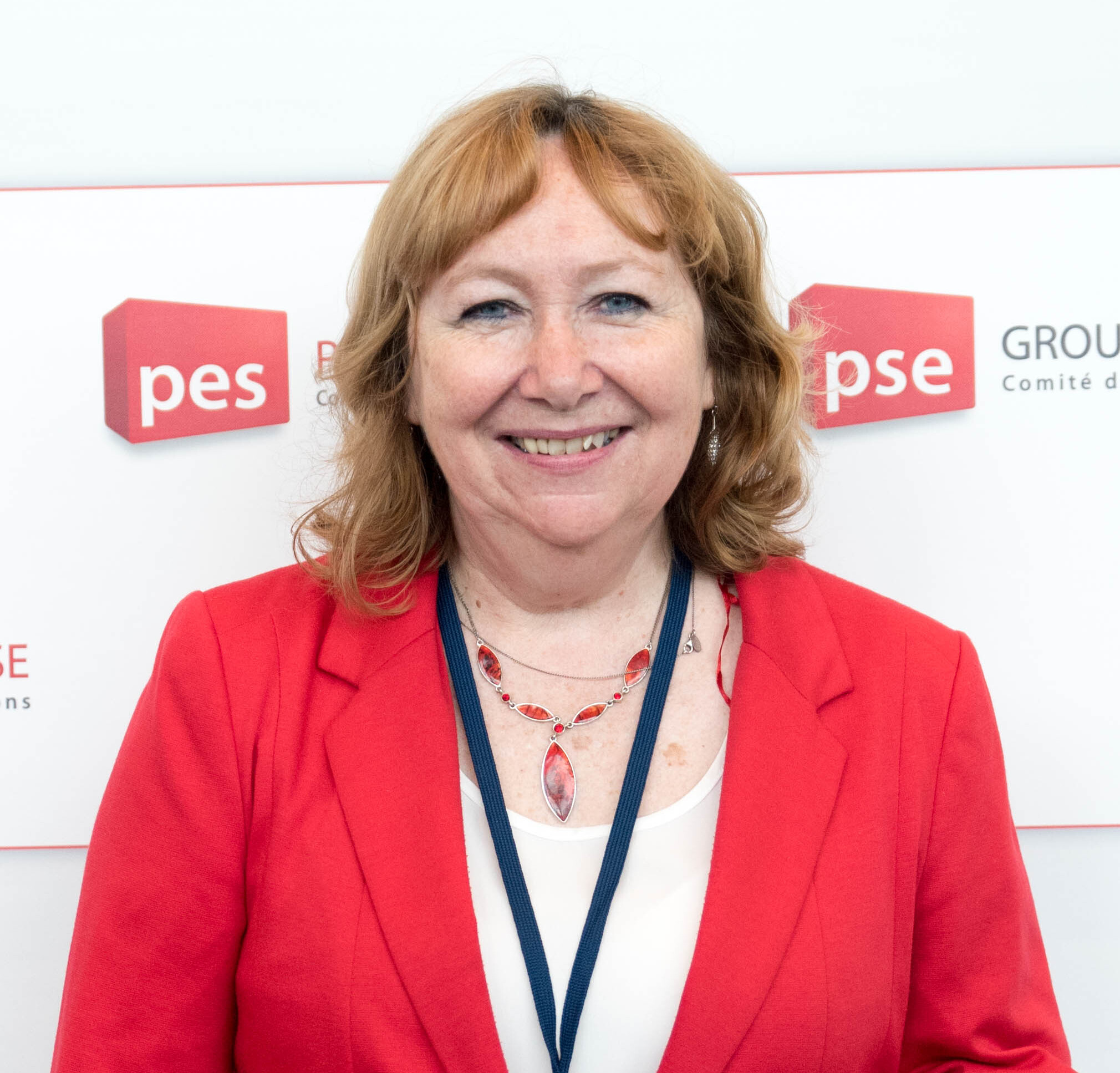
- Irene Oldfather in 2016

Member of the Scottish Parliament for Cunninghame South
- In office 6 May 1999 – 22 March 2011
- Preceded by: new constituency
- Succeeded by: Margaret Burgess

Personal details
- Born: 1954 (age 71–72) Glasgow, Scotland
- Party: Scottish Labour Party
- Education: University of Strathclyde

Irene Hamilton Oldfather (born 1954 in Glasgow) is a Scottish Labour Party politician. She was the Member of the Scottish Parliament (MSP) for the Cunninghame South constituency from 1999 until 2011, when she was defeated by the SNP's Margaret Burgess.

During her time in Parliament, Oldfather served primarily on the European and External Relations Committee, acting as Convener for part of the 1999 and all of 2007 Sessions, and as Deputy Convener between 2003 and 2007. She was also co-chair of the Parliament's working group on prescription drug dependency. She served as a member of the Parliament's first Health Committee where she was strongly supportive of tobacco control.

She set up the Parliament's Cross Party Group on Alzheimer's and ushered a Charter of Rights for People with Dementia through Parliament.

She was a member of North Ayrshire Council, being first elected in 1995, but was defeated in the 2017 Scottish local elections. She served as the council's vice-chair for education.

She was a Scottish member of European Committee of the Regions (CoR) from 1997 to 2011 where she served as Vice President of the Socialist Group (PES) for 11 years.

After leaving Politics she was a Consultant writing the Business Case for Big Lottery's £25 million spend, Life Changes Trust for People with Dementia. In 2012 Oldfather became Director of Strategic Partnerships and External Affairs at the Health and Social Care Alliance Scotland.

In 2015 she became a Scottish Representative of the European Economic and Social Committee (EESC) where she served until Brexit in January 2020.

in her earlier career,

She was a lecturer in government at the University of Arizona. She also did an internship at the Brookings Institution in Washington, DC working with Professor Richard Rose University of Strathclyde.

She attended Bank Street Primary and Irvine Royal Academy. She attended the University of Strathclyde, graduating with a BSc (Honours) and MSc in Politics.

In June 2024, she was awarded an Honorary Doctorate by the University of Strathclyde for national and international services to patients and carers.

She campaigned to Remain in the 2016 Brexit referendum and in 2022 became a Member of the United Kingdom Domestic Advisory Group (DAG) on the Trade and Cooperation Agreement (TCA) with Europe., where she was elected Vice Chair. In December 2024 she was re elected Vice Chair for a second term. In 2023 she set up the Scottish Advisory Forum on Europe (SAFE) which she Chairs. (2025).

Scottish Parliament
New parliament Scotland Act 1998	Member of the Scottish Parliament for Cunninghame South; 1999–2011	Succeeded by Margaret Burgess
