= Ruth Maguire =

Scottish National Party politician

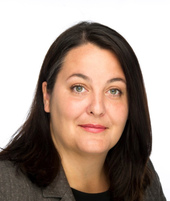

Member of the Scottish Parliament for Cunninghame South
- In office 5 May 2016 – 9 April 2026
- Preceded by: Margaret Burgess
- Succeeded by: Patricia Gibson

Personal details
- Born: Ruth Bernadette Finnie; 1976 (age 49–50) Inverness, Scotland
- Party: Scottish National Party
- Parent: John Finnie (father)
- Website: ruthmaguire.scot

Ruth Bernadette Maguire (born 1976) is a Scottish National Party (SNP) politician who was a Member of the Scottish Parliament (MSP) for Cunninghame South from 2016 to 2026.

Maguire was elected as a councillor for North Ayrshire Council in 2012, in the Irvine West ward. Alongside this role, Maguire was North Ayrshire Youth Champion, chaired the Violence against women partnership and served as Cabinet Member of Finance within the SNP admin.

On 5 May 2016, Ruth was elected to represent Cunninghame South within the Scottish Parliament. She resigned as a councillor following her election to parliament. Maguire was re-elected in 2021 to continue representing Cunninghame South.

Maguire is currently a part of committees for Education, Children and Young People and Local Government, Housing and Planning. She has also previously been on committees for; Local Government, Social Security, and Education and Skills.

Maguire is also a Co-convener for the cross-party group in the Scottish Parliament on Commercial Sexual Exploitation alongside being a member of the cross-party group on Nuclear Disarmament.

In April 2019, claiming it could change what it means to be male and female, Maguire was one of 15 SNP politicians who signed a public letter calling on the Scottish Government to delay reform to the Gender Recognition Act. Maguire was also the focus of a twitter storm and was called on to resign as convenor of Holyrood's Equalities and Human Rights committee after an exchange between her and SNP MSPs Ash Regan and Gillian Martin was leaked. In it, Maguire responded to a tweet praising the First Minister Nicola Sturgeon's 'positive feminist analysis of trans rights,' with ‘FFS’, agreed that Sturgeon was out of step with the SNP group, and questioned whether the minister in charge of the legislation, Shirley Anne Somerville, could have ignored what 'everyone' said.

Shortly before the 2021 election, Maguire was diagnosed with stage 3 cervical cancer. After taking medical leave and successful treatment, she returned to Holyrood in December 2021.

On 16 November 2024, Maguire announced she would stand down at the 2026 Scottish Parliament election.

Scottish Parliament
Preceded by Margaret Burgess	Member of the Scottish Parliament for Cunninghame South; 2016–2026	Succeeded by Patricia Gibson
