= Fairgrieve =

Fairgrieve may refer to:

- James Fairgrieve (1870–1953), British geographer, educator, and geopolitician
- John Fairgrieve (1926–2014), British sprinter
- Mungo Fairgrieve (1872–1937), Scottish educator
- Russell Fairgrieve (1924–1999), Scottish politician
- Stewart Fairgrieve, Canadian politician
- Walter Fairgrieve (1874–1915), Scottish footballer
- Fairgrieve Elementary School, school in Fulton, New York, United States
