= Heidi Hildersley Lyle =

Scottish pole athlete

Personal information
- Full name: Heidi Hildersley Lyle
- Nationality: Scottish
- Born: 28 November 1989 (age 36) Saltcoats, North Ayrshire, Scotland
- Occupation: Pole Athlete
- Years active: 2009–present

Sport
- Country: Great Britain
- Sport: Pole Dancing
- Rank: Professional

Achievements and titles
- Highest world ranking: Senior World Pole Champion 2018

Heidi Hildersley Lyle, born Heidi Hildersley, is a professional Scottish pole athlete who was Champion at the Pole World Championships 2018 and "Miss Pole Dance UK" in 2020. She has won awards in multiple national and international pole competitions.

== Career ==
Heidi Hildersley Lyle started pole dancing around 2009. She was already a full time aerobics instructor at the time and started training to teach pole dancing too.

She is now a full time fitness instructor and owner of HHL Pole and Fitness Studio, in Hamilton near Glasgow. She also teaches pole dancing/pole fitness workshops around the UK. She is known for her strength and pole tricks.

== Awards and achievements ==
=== 2020 ===
1st place - Miss Pole Dance UK 2020.

Best Tricks - Miss Pole Dance UK 2020.

=== 2019 ===
Best Tricks - Miss Pole Dance UK 2019.

3rd place - Pole World Championships 2019

=== 2018 ===
Senior World Pole Champion - Pole World Championships 2018.

Best Tricks - Pole World Championships 2018.

Best Tricks - Miss Pole Dance UK 2018.

1st place - Elite Category at Miss and Mister Pole Scotland 2018.

Best Tricks - Miss and Mister Pole Scotland 2018.

=== 2017 ===
3rd place - Elite Category at UK Professional Pole Championships 2017.

3rd place - Miss Pole Dance UK 2017.

Best Tricks - Miss Pole Dance UK 2017.

=== 2016 ===
1st place - IPAAT International Pole and Aerial Tournament 2016.

Best Tricks - IPAAT International Pole and Aerial Tournament 2016.

Best Costume - IPAAT International Pole and Aerial Tournament 2016.

=== 2015 and earlier ===
1st place - Professional Category at Miss and Mister Pole Scotland 2015.

3rd place - Pole Sports UK National Championships 2014.

1st place - Professional Category at Miss and Mister Pole Scotland 2013.

1st place - Edinburgh Pole Dance Competition 2013.

1st place - Edinburgh Pole Dance Competition 2012.

3rd place - Professional Category at Pole2pole European Championships 2012.

1st place - British Isles Pole Dancing Championships 2011.
