= Lady Isle =

Eilean Mhoire (Gaelic)

Location
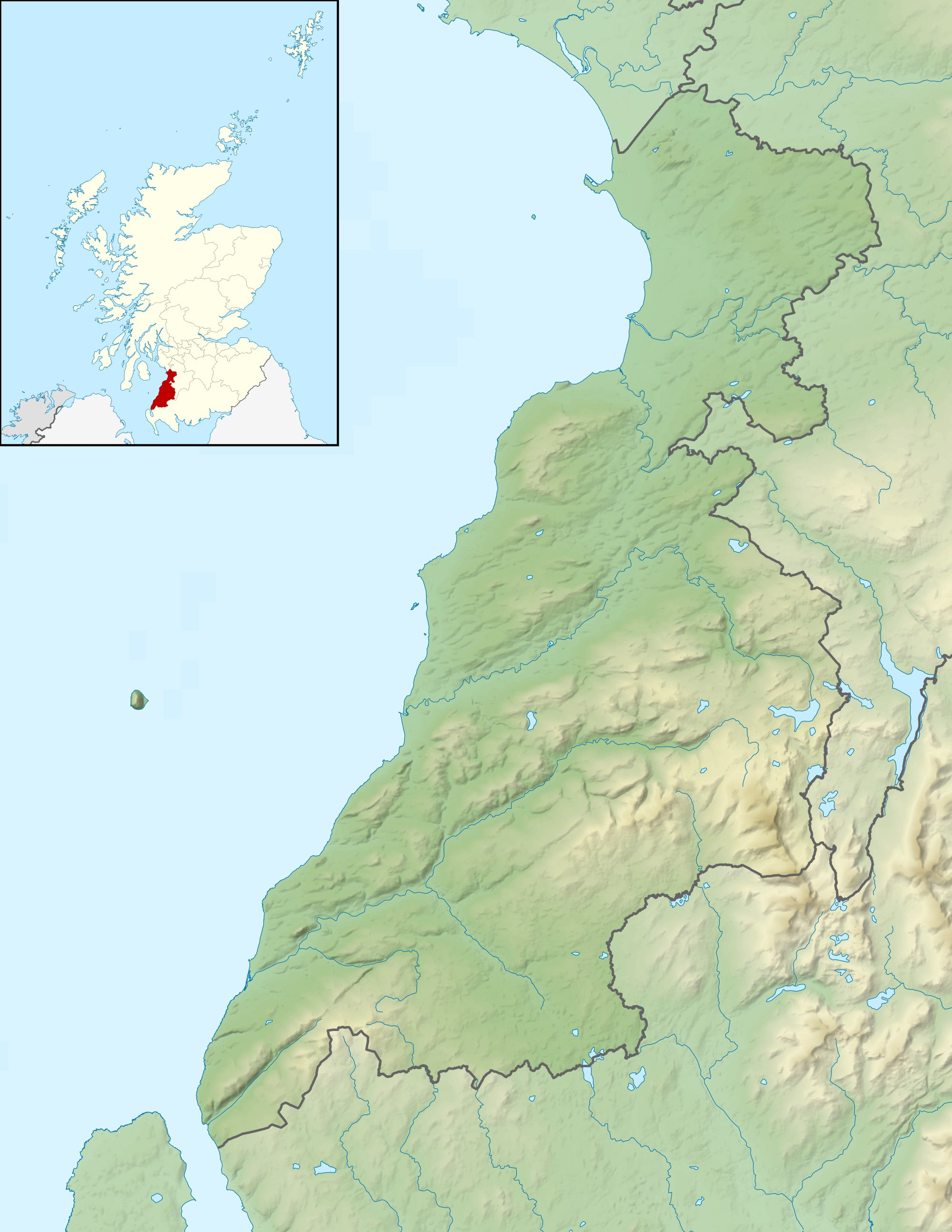
- Lady Isle shown within South Ayrshire
- OS grid reference: NS27529335
- Coordinates: 55.53°N 4.73°W

Physical geography
- Island group: Firth of Clyde
- Area: 2.3 ha (5.7 acres)
- Highest elevation: 6 m (20 ft)

Administration
- Council area: South Ayrshire
- Country: Scotland
- Sovereign state: United Kingdom

Demographics
- Population: 0

Lady Isle is a small, uninhabited island, in the Firth of Clyde, Scotland. It was once home to a chapel dedicated to Saint Mary. The island features a lighthouse and a freshwater spring.

== Geography ==
Lady Isle lies some two miles (three kilometres) southwest of Troon. The island is around 600 m (650 yd) along its length and rises to a maximum elevation of just 6 m (20 ft). Half tide, Scart rocks and Seal rock are associated with Lady Isle. The island lies in the parish of Dundonald in South Ayrshire.

== History ==
=== Evidence from old maps ===
Timothy Pont's map of 1604–1608, published in 1654 by Joan Blaeu, marks Lady Isle by that name and indicates that a structure is present on the island, presumably the chapel. In c. 1636 - 1662 Robert Gordon's manuscript map marks the isle as 'Lady Yle' and shows two islands. John Adair in his 1686 A mape of the west of Scotland containing Clydsdail, Nithsdail, Ranfrew, Shyre of Ayre, & Galloway. shows Lady Isle as Mary Isle and indicates a chapel as being located on the island. In 1745 Moll used the name Lady Isle.

=== Written history ===
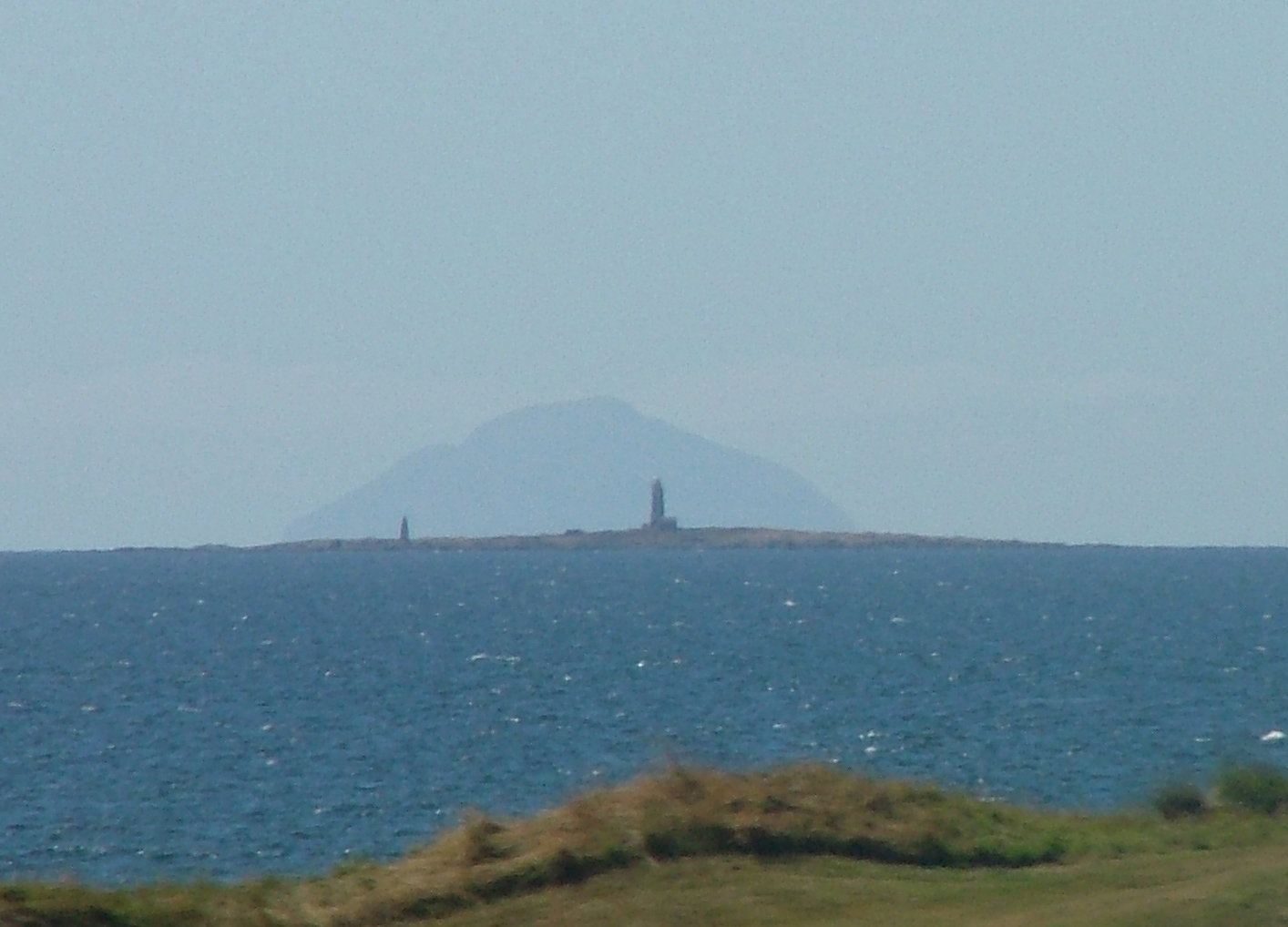
Lady Isle with Ailsa Craig beyond

When Edward I of England came to Ayr in 1299 following the burning of the Barns of Ayr, Hermingford, an old chronicler of the period, records that:

a nobleman from Ireland, named Thomas Bysset, arrived at the Isle of Ayr, and they that were dwelling there surrendered themselves to him," and that " he besought the King to grant the possession of it to himself and his heirs in perpetuity. The King granted the request and confirmed it by his own authority.

It is thought that the name Isle of Ayr refers to Lady Isle.

The Geographical Collections relating to Scotland state:

The Lady Isle, which belongs to the Earle of Dundonald by gift from one of the Scottish Kings, lays west from Corsbie about 3 or 4 miles of sea, where is the mines of ane old chapell with an excellent spring of water, abounds with rabels, plenty of all sorts of water foull and whyt fish in good store about it.

Lady Isle is probably first mentioned in the title of William Fullarton of that Ilk, in his Charter under the Great Seal by William III, dated 9 December 1695, which included "the five pound land of Aldtoun containing the little isle, opposite the lands of Corsbie, called the Lady-isl".

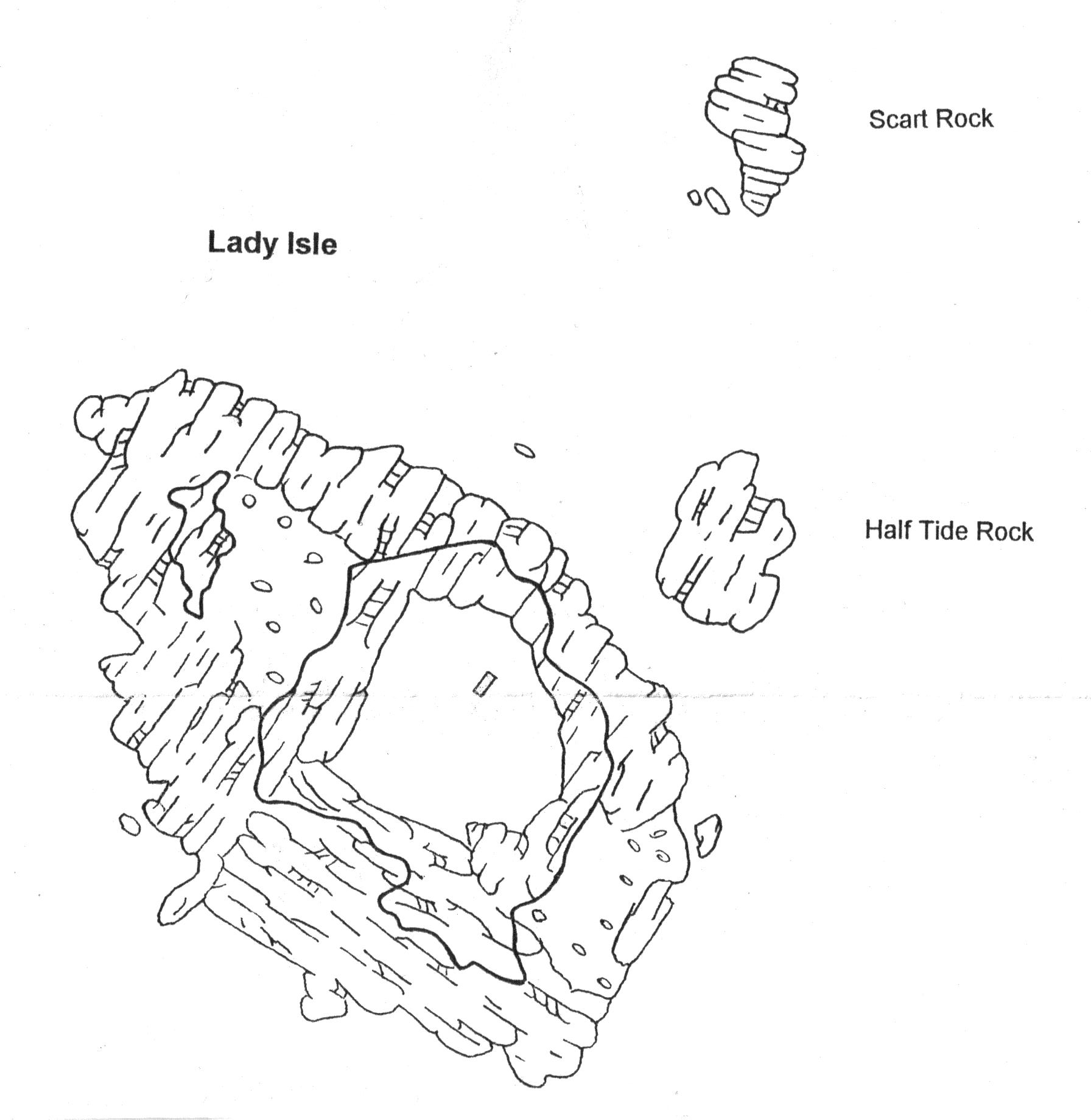
A map of the island and associated rocks. Note the rock cut basin in the centre of the island.

The island came into the possession of William Fullarton in 1698 and was purchased by the Marquess of Titchfield in 1805. When the Marquess was elevated to become the Duke of Portland the island was part of the Duke's Fullarton Estate.

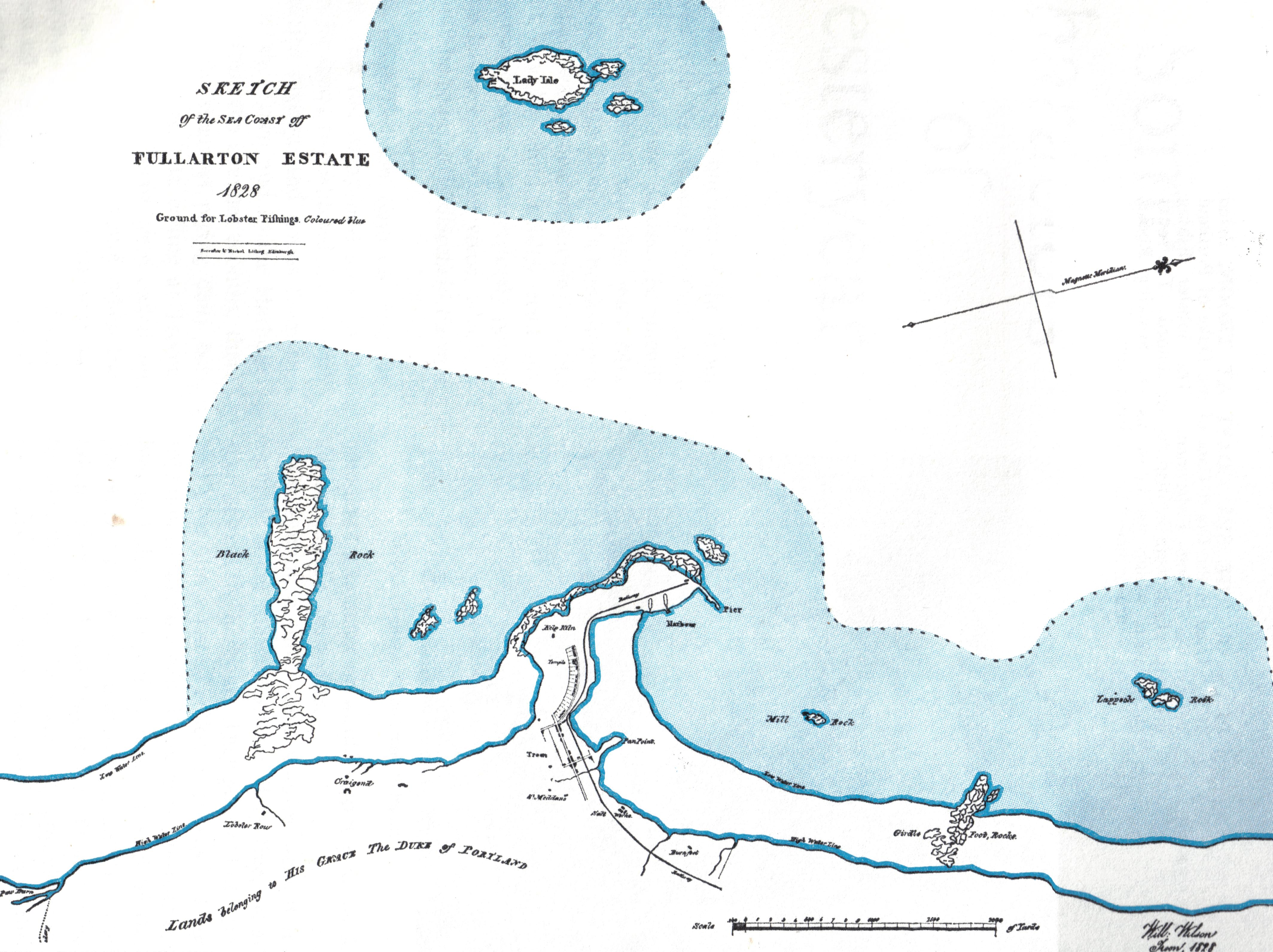
An 1828 map of the Fullarton Estate.

One suggestion is that the name "Lady" is actually derived from the Scottish Gaelic word Laidh, meaning a 'ship's course'. Lady Isle has probably always been important to navigators as is shown by the fact that in the 17th century, the Magistrates of Glasgow built two stone pillars on the Isle, and lining them up from the east gave a good anchorage from a north west gale.

William Taylor, a member of a pleasure party from Ayr in the 1890s was hit by lightning during a storm and was killed instantly. He left a wife and three children.

In June, 1821, someone set fire to the "turf and pasture", and this act permanently destroyed the island's grazing, with gales blowing much of the island's soil into the sea. It is only slowly recovering. In June 1829, the Isle was let to Mr. William Fullarton of Skeldon, who restocked the Isle with rabbits. Fullarton built a house or lodge of some sort. The building was broken into several times and eventually a family of fishermen from Troon were arrested, tried and given a relatively small fine.

== Structures on the island ==
=== Saint Mary's chapel ===
Lady Isle was at one time connected with an ancient ecclesiastical establishment near Adamton, called Lady Kirk, and situated about four miles north of Ayr. As stated, a chapel was built, here dedicated to the Virgin Mary and endowed by John Blair in 1446 with the common land of Adamton. John Adair's map indicates a religious building as being located in the centre of the island and Pont also indicates a structure of some sort, well before any beacons were built. John Adair uses the name Mary Isle for the island, suggesting that this pre-reformation (c.1560s) 'chapel', like so many others, was dedicated to Saint Mary. It is more than likely that the beacons were built using stones from this chapel or 'cell' and no signs now remain of this ecclesiastical structure. When the bird observatory and warden's post was being built, the architect noted that there were signs of some sort of ancient ecclesiastical building on the island.

=== Beacons ===
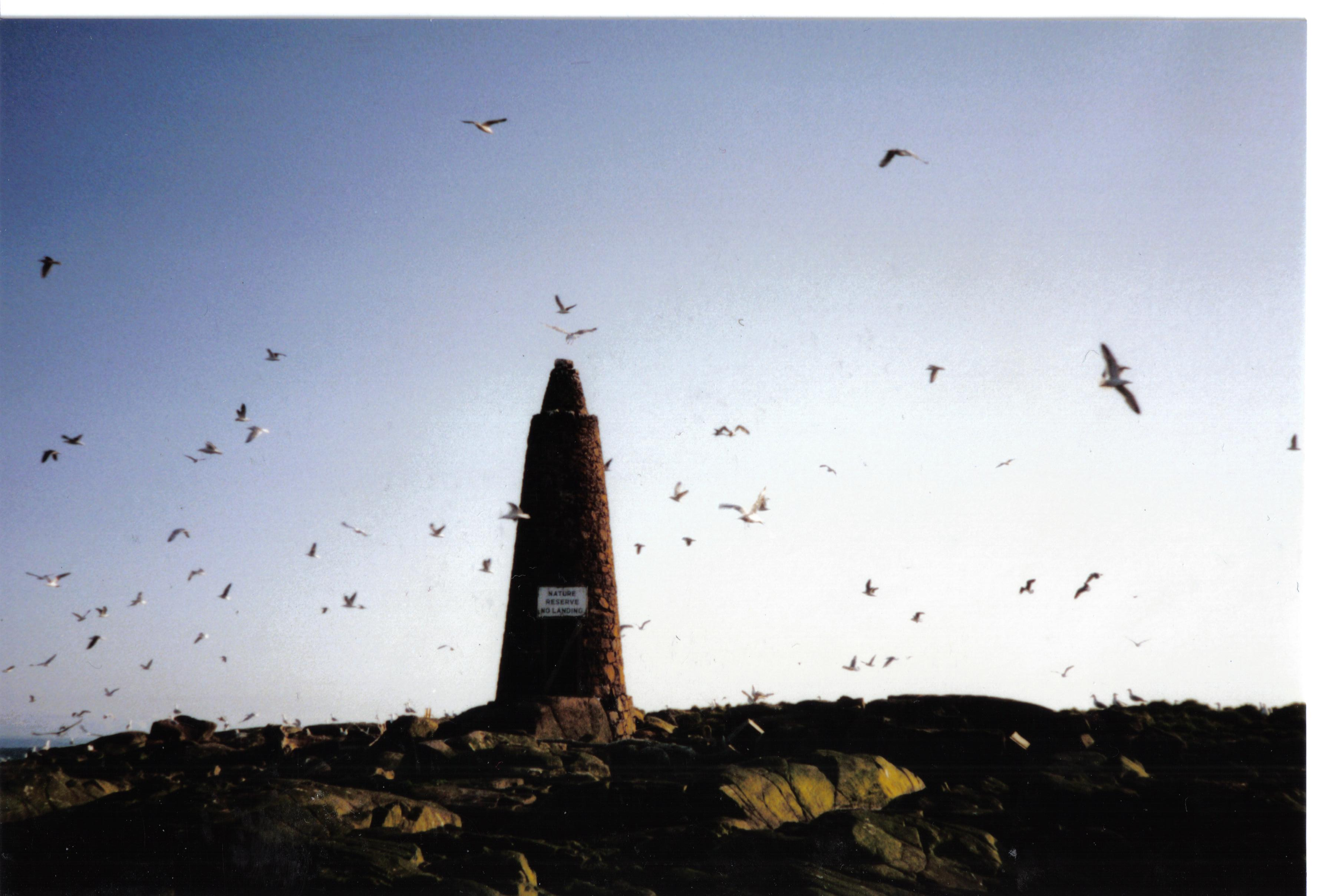
The 'beacon' used for gaining a safe anchorage.

The town of Glasgow (c. 1776) set up a pair of beacons on Lady Isle to indicate the position of the anchorage, which was situated to the east or inshore, for the benefit of ships serving its merchants. This information is given on Armstrong's 1775 map. John Thomson's 1828 map marks two 'towers', one where the present 'beacon' stands and the other at the site of the present lighthouse. Herman Moll in 1745 shows no features at all on his map, but marks two islands.

The lighthouse was built on the site of one of the beacons and therefore the remaining 18th-century 'beacon' when aligned with the lighthouse continued to allow mariners to follow a safe course to a sheltered anchorage. Ships of over 220 tons, too large to enter the harbours of Saltcoats [NS24SW 44.00], Irvine [NS33NW 40.00] or Ayr [NS32SW 123.00] could find anchorage in 10 to 14 fathoms [18 to 26m] in an area east of, and covered by Lady Isle [name: NS 275 293].

=== Lighthouse ===
Lady Isle Lighthouse
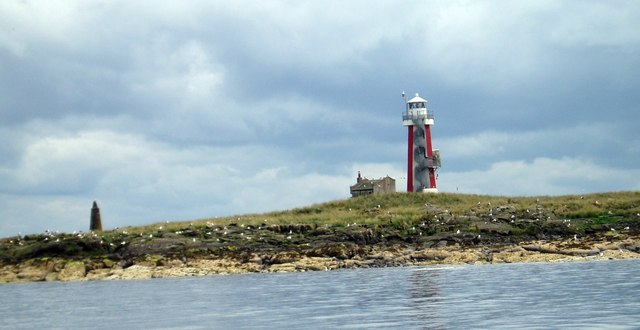
- Lady Isle Lighthouse in 2009
- Location: Lady Isle; Troon; Ayrshire; Scotland; United Kingdom
- Coordinates: 55.527180°N 4.733944°W

Tower
- Constructed: 1903
- Designed by: David Alan Stevenson
- Construction: concrete tower
- Height: 15 m (49 ft)
- Shape: cylindrical tower with external spiral stairway
- Markings: white tower and lantern, red vertical stripes
- Power source: solar power
- Operator: Northern Lighthouse Board
- Heritage: category B listed building

Light
- Focal height: 19 m (62 ft)
- Range: 11 nmi (20 km)
- Characteristic: Fl W 2 s

Lady Isle is home to an interesting lighthouse. Established in 1903 the lighthouse is not the standard round tower type but rather consists of a platform built on buttresses with an exterior stairwell. The light is still used as a navigational aid (Fl(4)30s19m8M) and is managed by the Northern Lighthouse Board. An X/S Band racon radar beacon, with S Band emissions restricted to landward is also on the lighthouse. A small wooden storage hut sits beside the lighthouse, rather oddly inscribed Social Security Appeals Tribunal. A large white horizontal cylinder used to hold the gas supply for the lighthouse light which was converted to electricity during the refurbishment and solarisation in around 2004. Regarding the approach to the island, mariners have to beware the drying rock all around the island up to 2 cables to the northeast (see the map).

=== Bird observatory and warden's post. ===
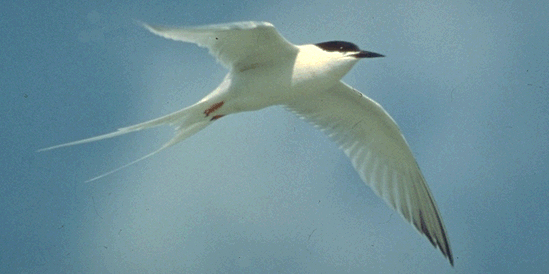
Roseate tern in flight.

Lady Isle is owned by the Marquess of Ailsa and was for many years leased out as a bird sanctuary with a bird observatory and warden's post built and run by the Scottish Society for the Protection of Wild Birds (SSPWB). Common terns and Arctic terns used to nest here and roseate terns had been observed on many occasions. The observatory carries a sign saying that it was built In memory of Johnny Warren, honorary warden Lady Isle Sanctuary Troon who died 24 May 1958.

Lady Isle is said to have been Britain's first seabird reserve. The Scottish Natural Heritage has designated the island as a Wild Bird Sanctuary under the Protection of Birds Act 1954 and as an Area of Special Protection, together with Horse Isle off Ardrossan. Scart rock off the island is named from the Scots for a cormorant. Mr. Donald J. Cameron, was the architect for the SSPWB and he informed their Secretary that there were signs of some sort of ancient ecclesiastical building on the island.

=== The Freshwater well or spring ===
A freshwater well or spring lies in a rock cut basin in the middle of the island. This may be entirely natural or partly so, as place name and other evidence suggests that a chapel once existed here and a supply of freshwater would have been essential. Sheep were once grazed here and they would have required a good supply of freshwater, as would the rabbits which still survive (1993). Two elder bushes were growing over the well / spring during the 1993 Scottish Wildlife Trust visit.

=== Trig point ===
An Ordnance Survey trig point has been placed on the island, just in front of the bird observatory, indicating the 6 m height point. This Trig point is a truncated square concrete pyramid, generally known as a Hotine Pillar. On the top is a brass plate with three arms and a central depression is fixed. A benchmark is set on the side, marked with the letters "O S B M" (Ordnance Survey Bench Mark) and the reference number. Within the trig point are concealed mountings for a specialized theodolite, which can be temporarily mounted on the trig point for measurements to be taken.

On 24 September 2000 a small group of Trig point enthusiasts visited the island as part of a quest to visit one trig point of every height in metres in Scotland, making 749 in total.

== Gallery ==
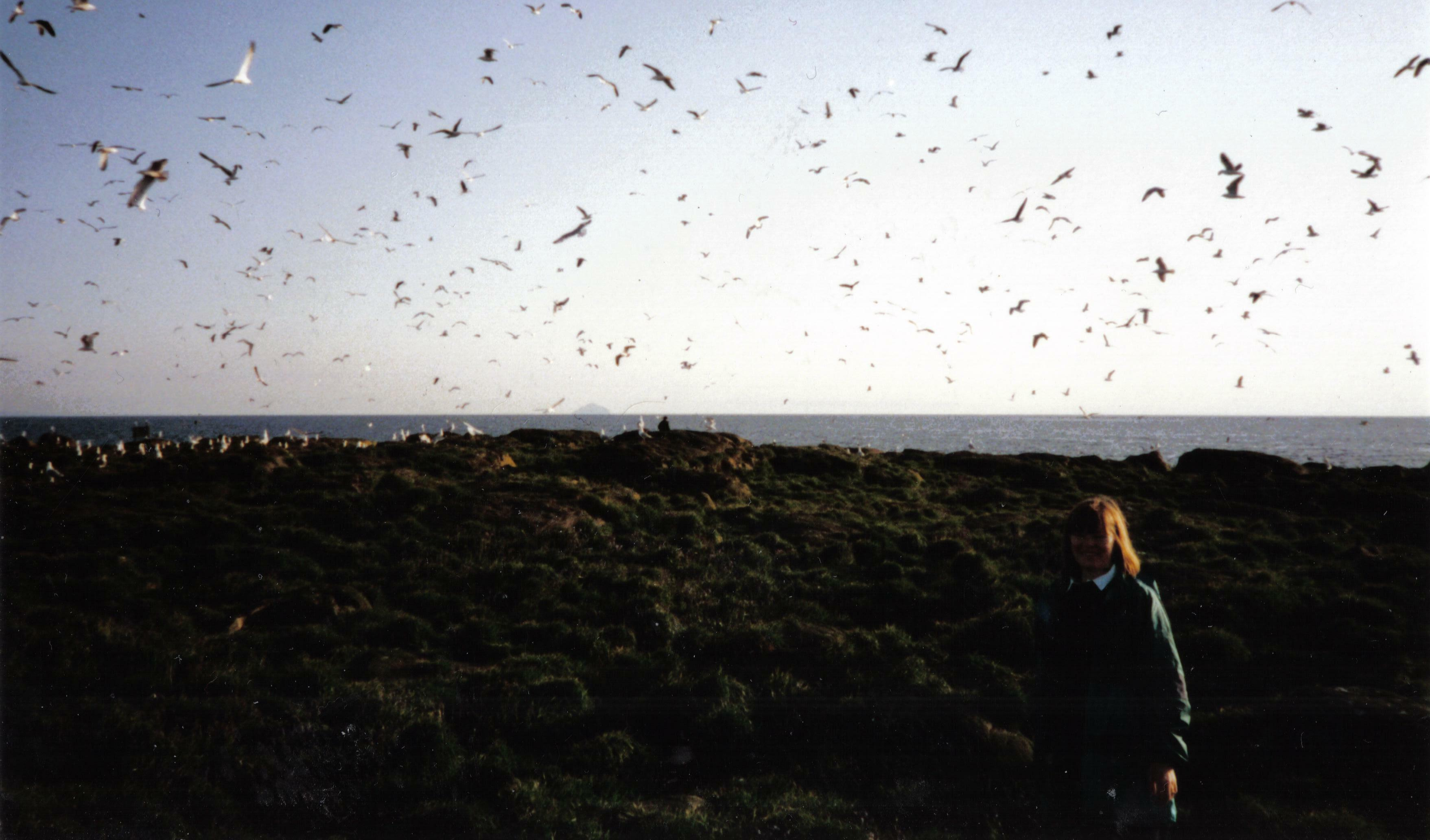
The island's vegetation; Ailsa Craig in the background.

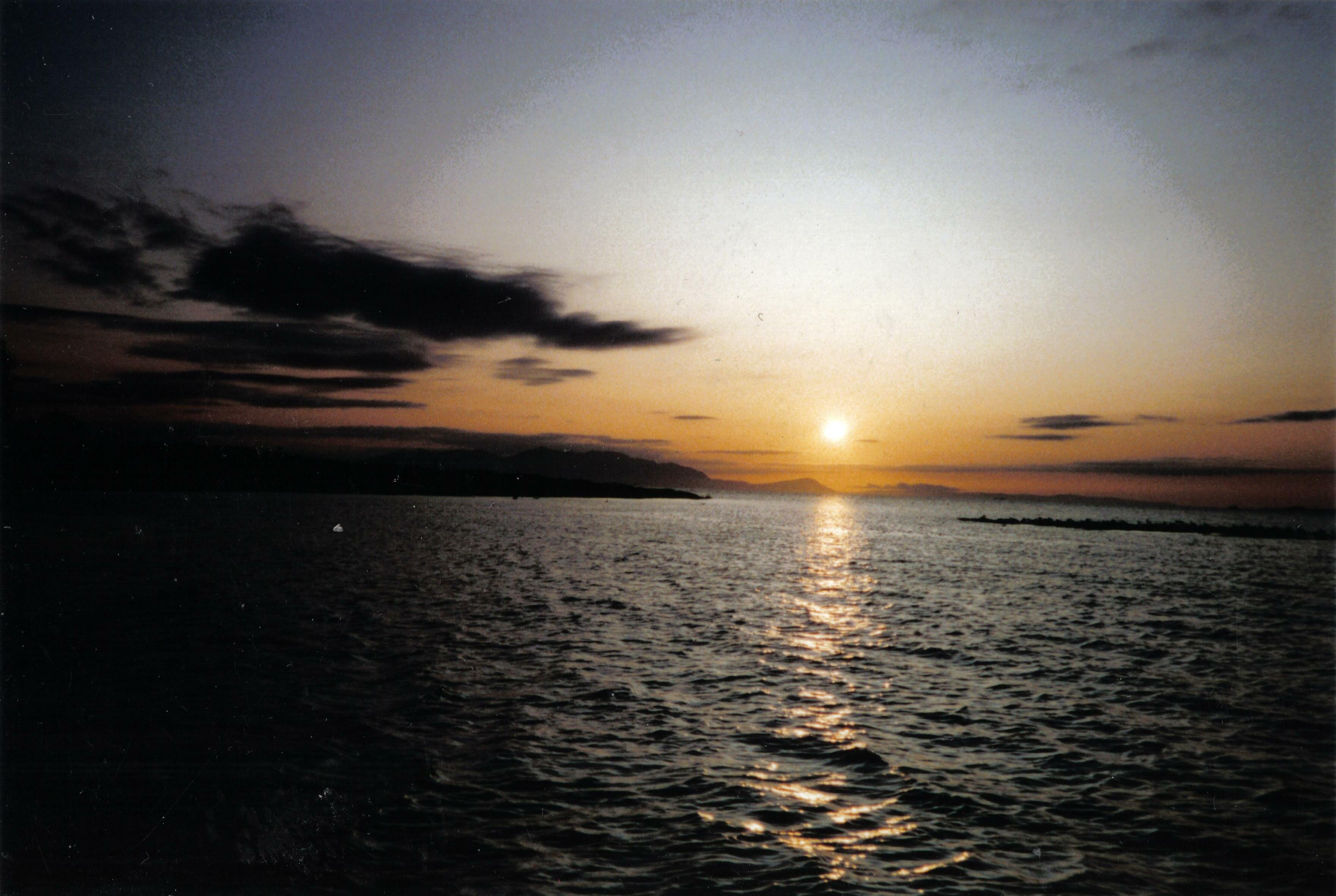
Sunset over the island looking towards the Isle of Arran. The Half tide rock is visible to the right hand side.

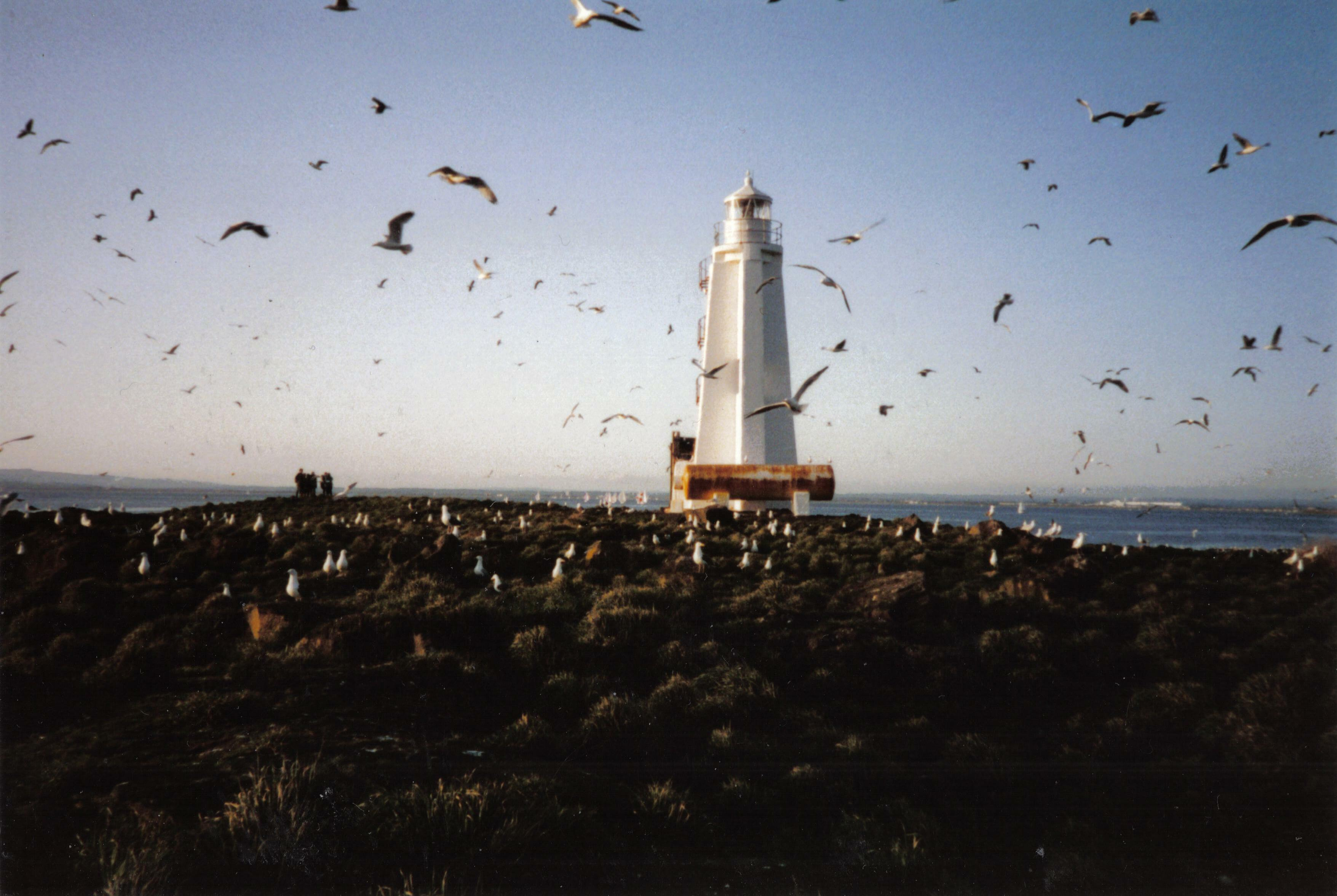
The 1903 lighthouse with Irvine in the background.

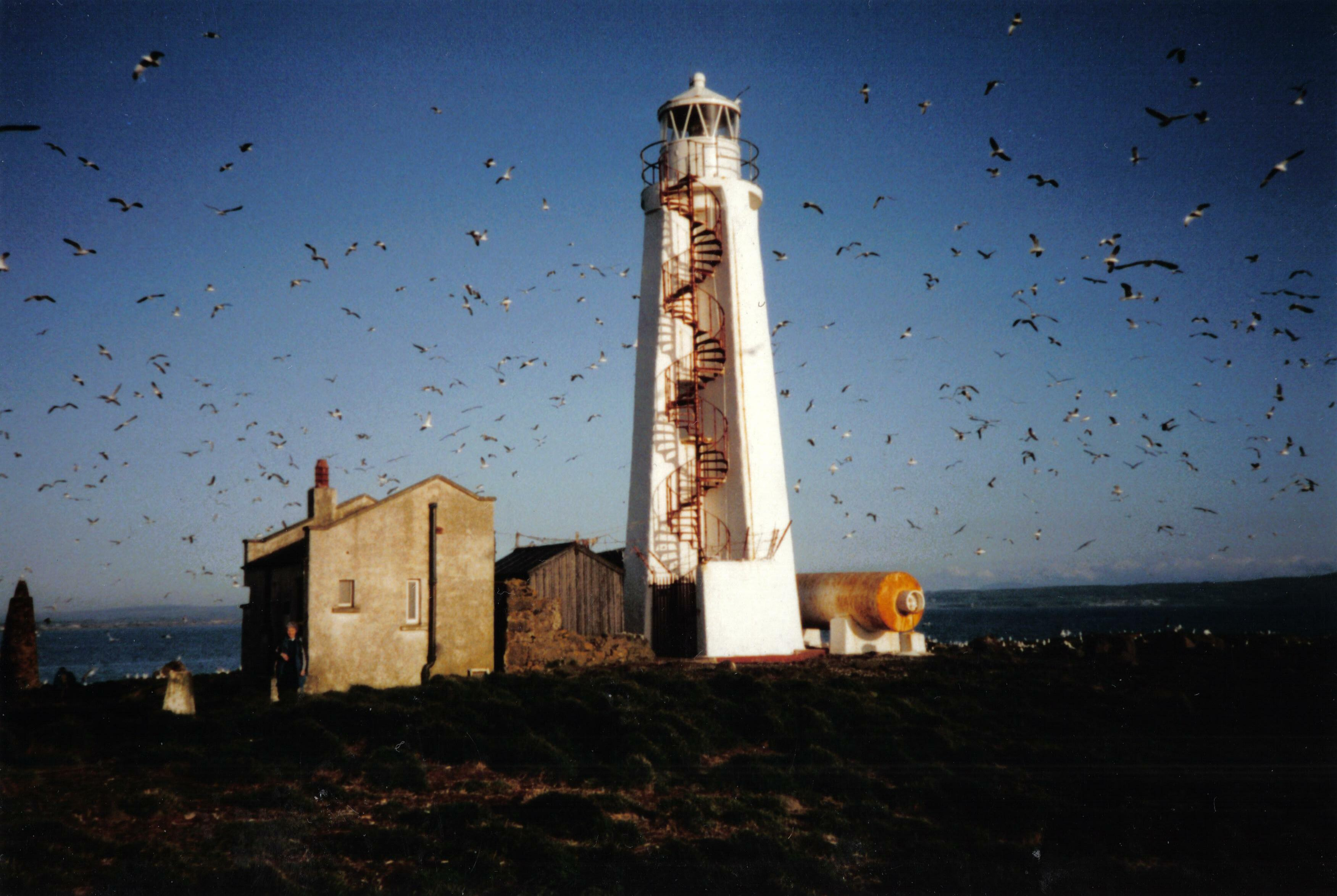
The bird observatory, lighthouse, Trig point and shed, with the 'beacon' in the background.

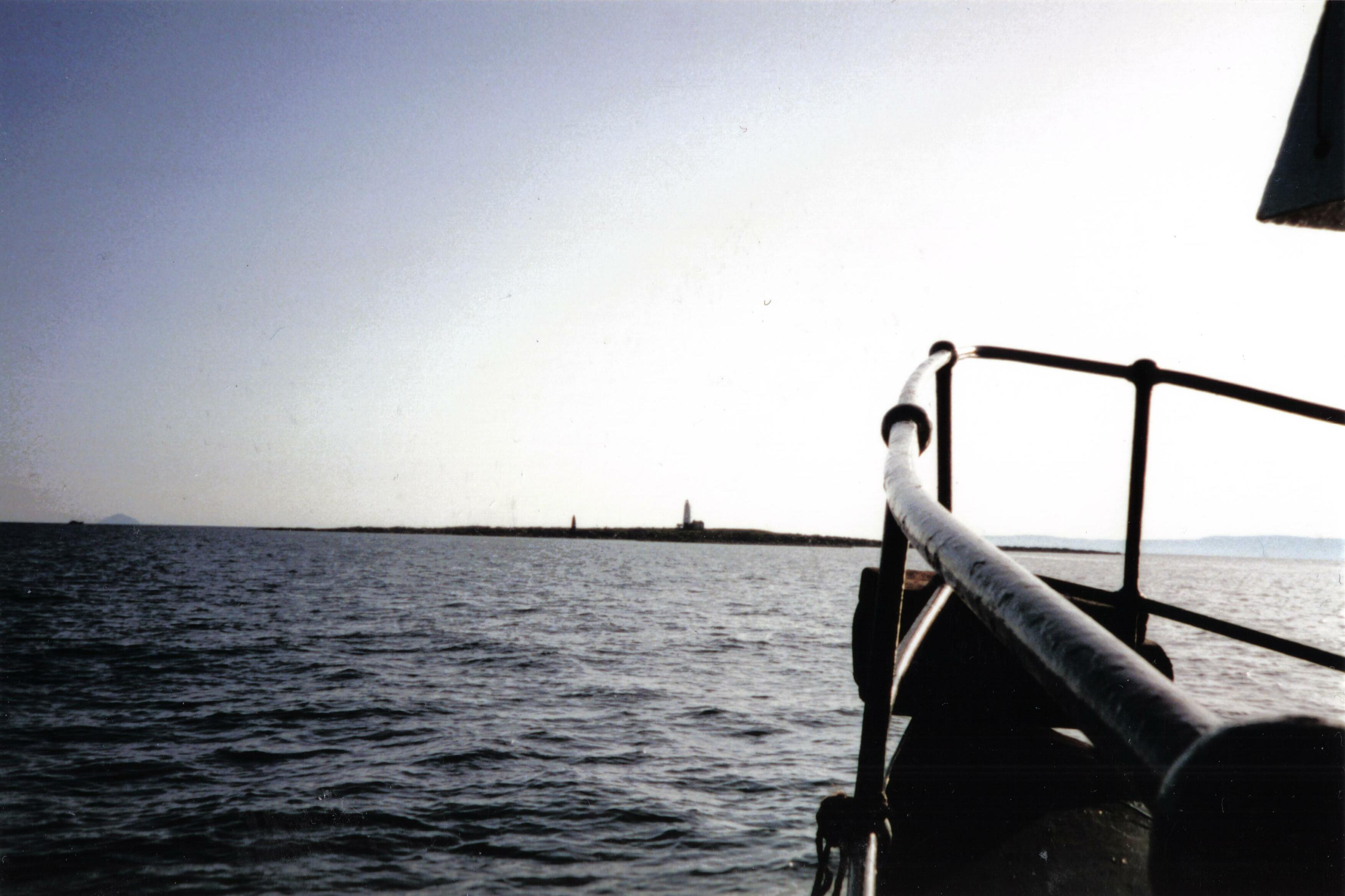
The island with the lighthouse and 'beacon' visible.

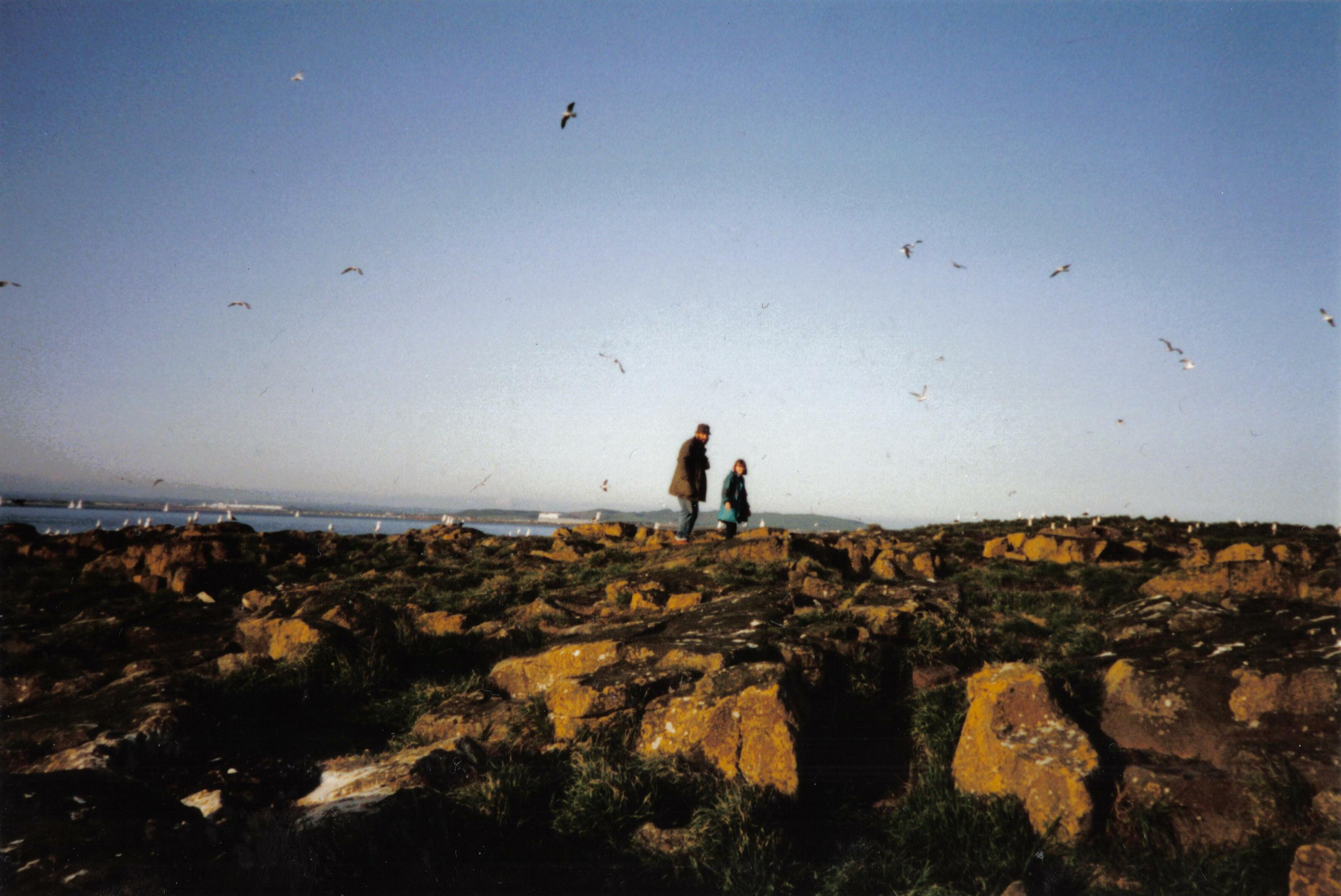
Looking over the island towards Irvine.

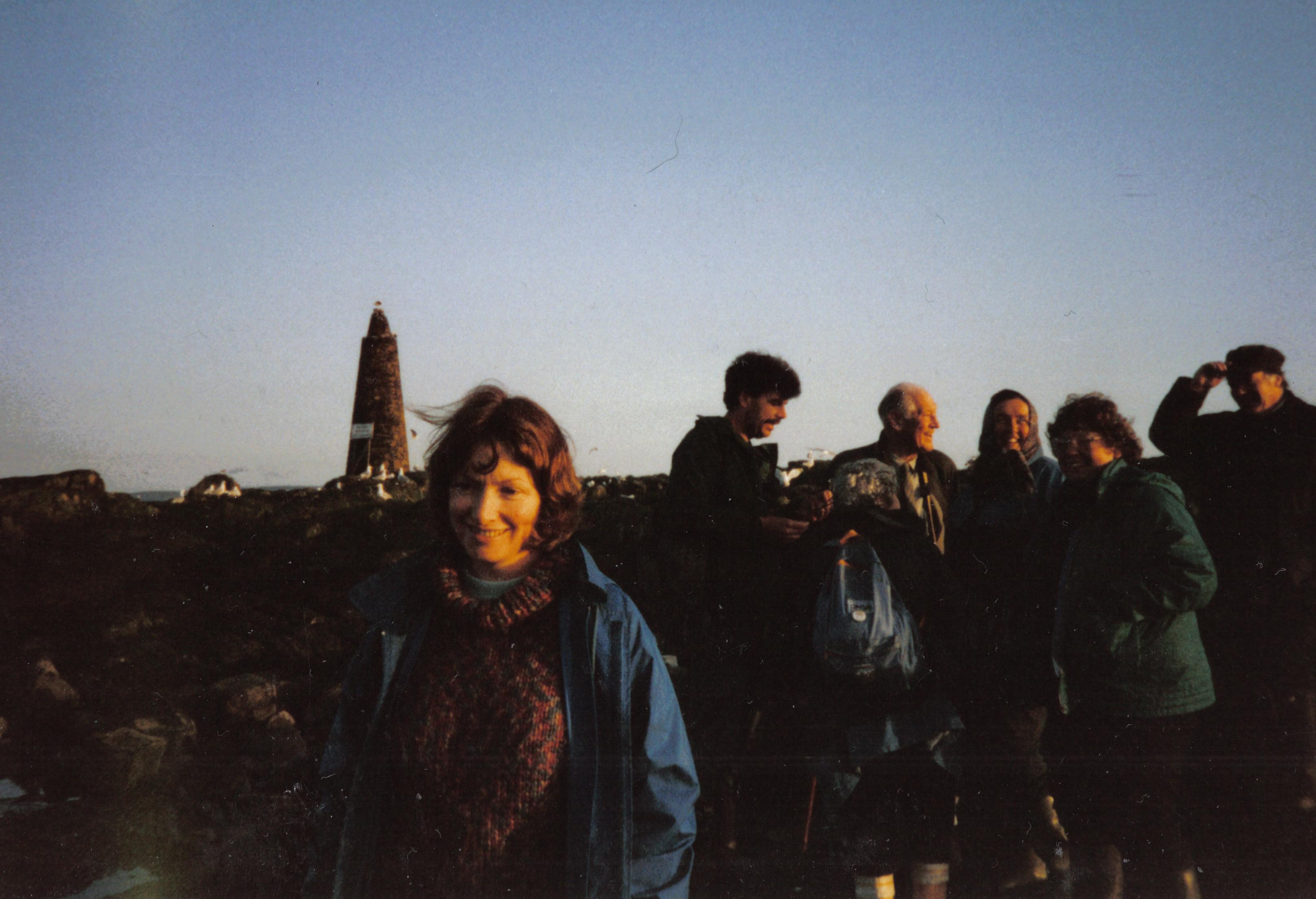
Members of the Scottish Wildlife Trust visiting Lady Isle in 1993.

== Shipwrecks ==
A few ships have been shipwrecked off the island; however, the crews were easily rescued. It is said that there are the remains of a great many shipwrecks around the Isle. An old story relates that one of the Spanish Armada ships was wrecked here, and sank in deep water. A local sorceress, named Elcine de Aggart, is said to have used a ball of yarn and spells to cause the ship to wreck itself on the island and it is further recorded that the ship was that of none other than Vice-Admiral Alcarede. The galleon is said to have been carrying a gold throne on board, a gift to King Phillip of Spain. Troon men made many attempts to bring the Spanish treasures to the surface, but without success.

A professional Dutch diver was supposedly hired to do the salvage job, making his headquarters on the isle, with a store ship standing by. Upon discovering the wreck and entering he found the golden throne, on which was seated, a gigantic figure who rose and came towards him. When the diver grasped the hand of the figure, instead of a hand, he found that he was grasping a cloven hoof! He escaped the scene with his life and some of his wits intact. However, no one has attempted further salvage attempts. One of the Masters of a Kilwinning Lodge was presented with a wooden mallet which had been made with wood from one of the Armada ships which had been wrecked on the Ayrshire coast.

== Flora and fauna ==
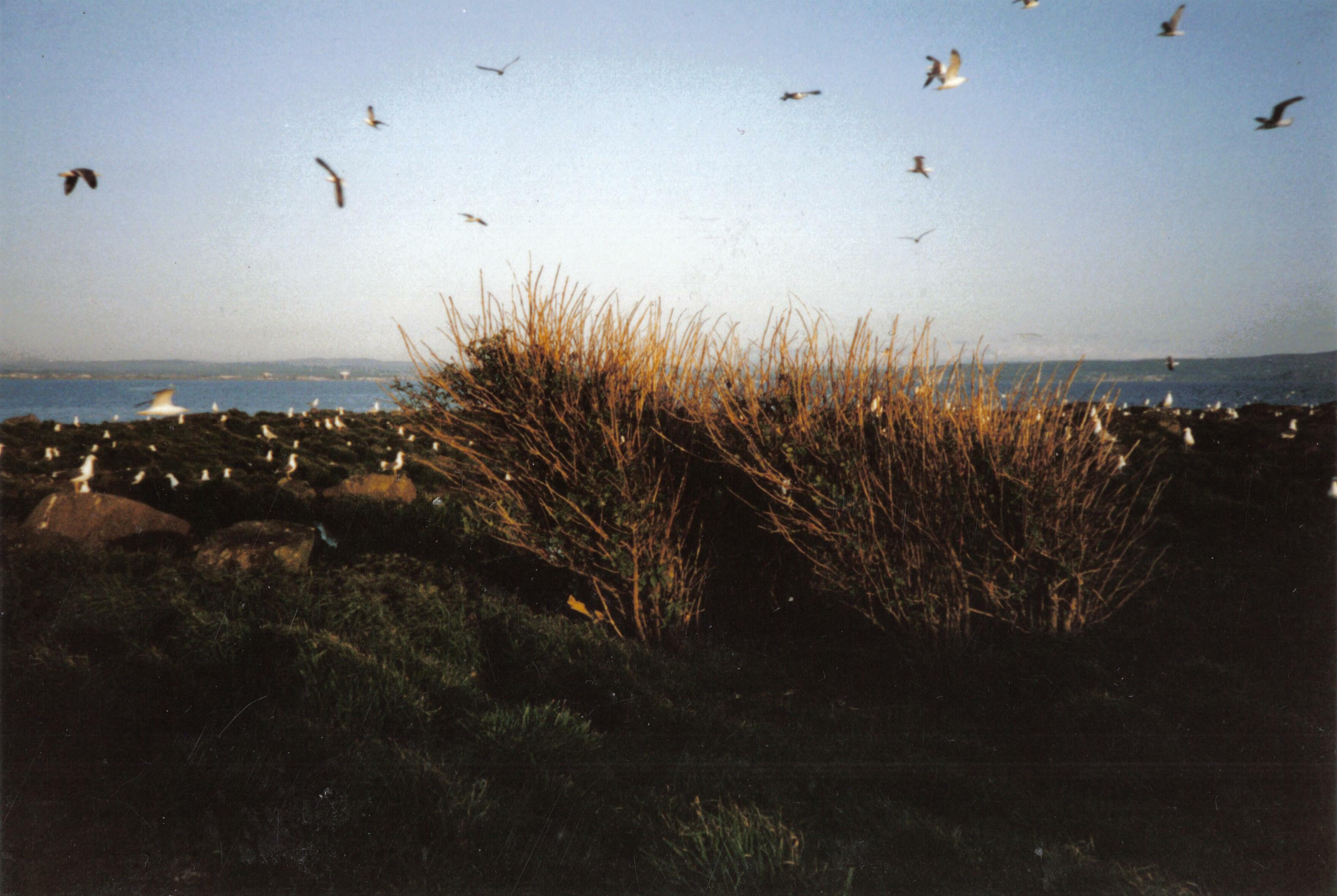
Looking towards Heads of Ayr. Elder bushes in the foreground growing over the freshwater spring. Much of the island's vegetation was lost in a 19th-century fire

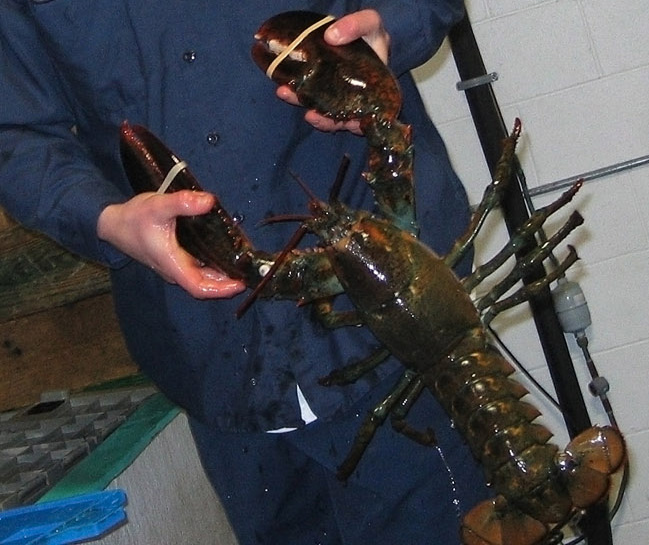
A mature lobster

Apart from the large numbers of gulls, eiders nest on the island. Shags and oystercatchers are frequently seen. A population of rabbits survive with partially collapsed burrows criss-crossing the parts of the islet with have a significant depth of soil. In the Statistical Account of Scotland of 1791, under the Article on the Parish of Ayr, it confirms that the Isle is inhabited by rabbits. A large number of the common snail, Cornu aspersum species were noted on the 1993 SWT visit. One odd feature of the island was the very large numbers of animal bones, mostly of mammal origin, brought here by the gulls.

Seals are frequently seen on the island and the associated rocks, one of which is called Seal Rock. A Mr. William Allasson of Troon was tenant of the isle in 1811, and he was hindered by the large number of people who landed on the isle, causing damage to his flock of sheep, and stealing the rabbits. Lobsters were plentiful amongst the surrounding rocks and in the past the Duke of Portland went to considerable trouble to try and prevent 'poaching' of the lobsters as he saw it.

Elder bushes grow near the freshwater spring and sea pinks are very common. As previously stated, a fire in the 19th-century resulted in the loss of much of the island's soil, the wind blowing it into the sea. The island has been designated site number 8725, an 'Area of Special Protection' by Scottish Natural Heritage.

Smith records sea mouse-ear (Cerastium diffusum), narrow-leaved mouse-ear (Cerastium triviale), sea-pearlwort (Sagina maritima), corn spurrey (Spergula arvensis), greater sea-spurrey (Spergularia media), dove's-foot cranesbill (Geranium molle), common stork's-bill (Erodium cicutarium), common vetch (Vicia sativa), bramble (Rubus fruticosus), common silverweed (Argentina anserina), marsh cinquefoil (Comarum palustre), and English stonecrop (Sedum anglicum) for Lady Isle in the 1890s.

== The Scottish Wildlife Trust's (SWT) visit ==
It was proposed that the Scottish Wildlife Trust might take over the isle as a reserve, however the decline of the tern colony led to this proposal being rejected. The hypothesis that the gulls were responsible for the loss of the terns is unfounded. It is more likely, though not certain, that the reduction in breeding terns across the whole of the Clyde area is due to a combination of reduced feeding grounds and limited habitats suitable for breeding due to human development. Members visited the island on 19 May 1993 to assess its value as a reserve, taking the boat from Troon harbour which regularly visits the island to maintain the lighthouse.

== VIC Lady isle ==
In the late 1950s a coastal cargo carrying Ex VIC 9 ship named 'Lady Isle' still plied its trade in Scottish waters. VIC stands for Victualling Inshore Craft and these ships were technically steam coasting lighters or "puffers". 98 VICs were built for the ministry of war transport between 1941 and 1945; part of the enormous Government wartime shipbuilding programme. Lady Isle was built by Thorne Dunston of Doncaster in 1942 and she was sold by the admiralty in 1949.

== Troon Cruising Club ==
This club has an annual Lady Isle race in support of the RNLIs Troon branch.

== See also ==
- List of islands in Scotland
- List of lighthouses in Scotland
- List of Northern Lighthouse Board lighthouses
