= George McGregor =

Scottish footballer

Personal information
- Place of birth: Saltcoats, Scotland
- Height: 5 ft 8 in (1.73 m)
- Position: Inside forward

Senior career*
Years	Team	Apps	(Gls)
1926–1927	Saltcoats Victoria		
1927–1929	St Mirren		
1929–1930	Sunderland	1	(0)
1930–1931	Glasgow Benburb		
1931–193?	India of Inchinnan		
- * Club domestic league appearances and goals

George McGregor was a Scottish professional footballer who played as an inside forward for Sunderland.
