= Ailsa Craig tomato =

Tomato variety

Ailsa Craig
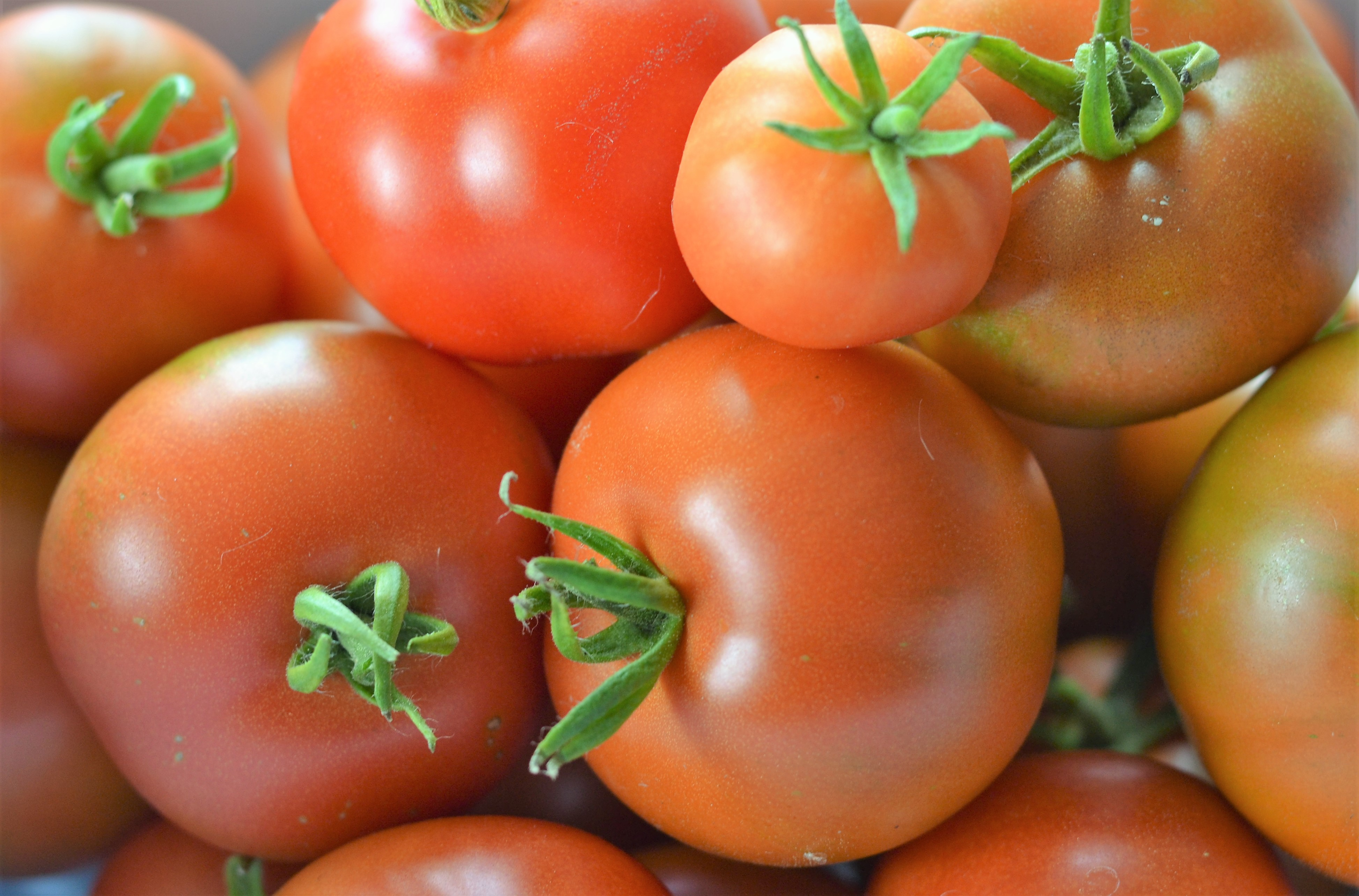

Tomato (Solanum lycopersicum)
- Maturity: 55-70 days
- Type: Heirloom
- Vine: Indeterminate
- Plant height: 1.5 metres
- Fruit weight: 30 to 70 grammes
- Leaf: Regular leaf
- Color: Red
- Shape: round

Ailsa Craig (originally "Balch's Ailsa Craig") is a medium-sized red variety of tomato. It was first bred in 1908 by nurseryman Alan Balch of Girvan, Scotland as a cross between the varieties "Balch's Fillbasket" and "Carter's Sunrise", and was introduced to market by Alexander and Brown in 1912. It was named after the island Ailsa Craig, visible from Balch's nursery in Girvan.

Ailsa Craig is known for its excellent flavour, although is susceptible to the condition 'greenback', where the fruit ripens unevenly. The variety "Craigella" is a greenback-resistant selection of Ailsa Craig, bred by L. A. Darby of the Glasshouse Crops Research Institute, Littlehampton, and released to commerce in 1963. The variety was also widely used in breeding greenhouse tomatoes in the United States, being a parent of varieties such as "Michigan State Forcing".
