= Betsy Miller =

Elizabeth Miller (1792–1864) was a Scottish merchant. She has been referred to as the first female sea captain in Great Britain.

She was the daughter of the successful timber merchant and shipowner William Miller from Saltcoats on the Ayrshire coast by the Firth of Clyde. She took over the company from her father. She was the first woman to be given a sea captain license from the Board of Trade, and was referred to as a reference case during a debate in the House of Commons on the Merchant Shipping Act 1834. She retired in 1862 and left the company to her sister Hannah.
