= Ailsa Craig =

Island west of Ayrshire, Scotland

Creag Ealasaid (Gaelic)
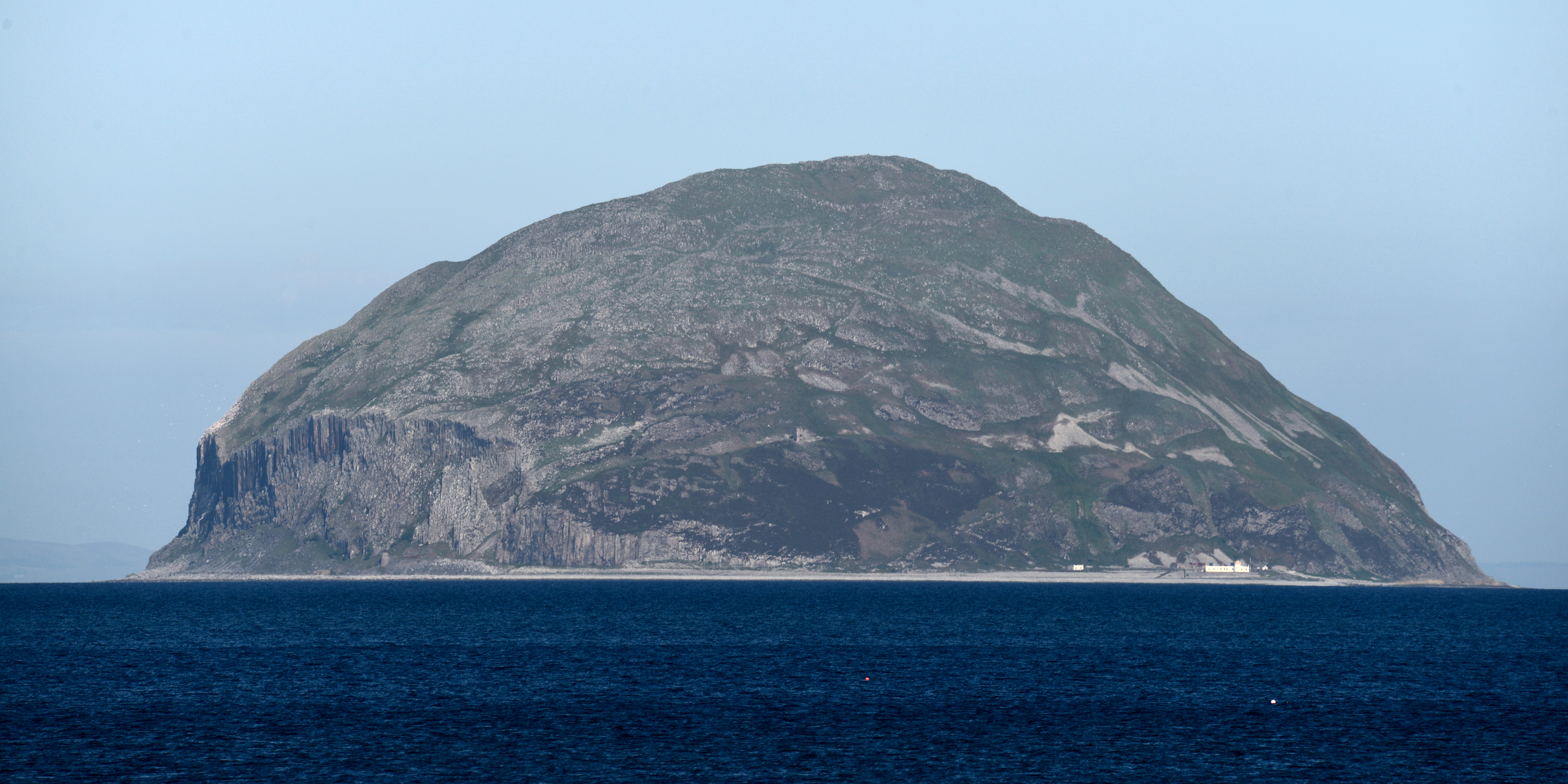
- Ailsa Craig from the southeast

Location
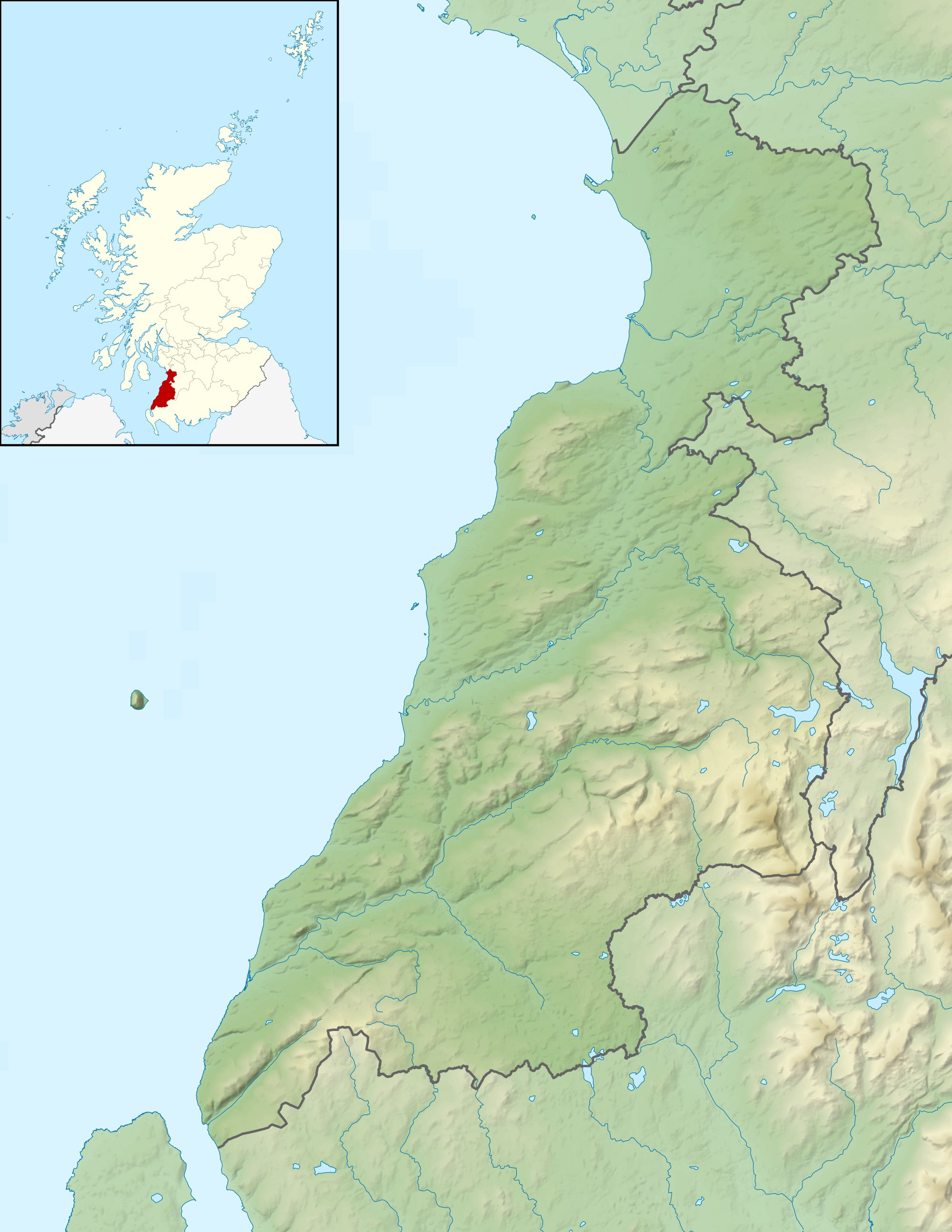
- Ailsa Craig shown within South Ayrshire
- OS grid reference: NX019997
- Coordinates: 55°15′07″N 05°06′59″W

Physical geography
- Island group: Firth of Clyde
- Area: 99 ha (240 acres)
- Area rank: 150
- Highest elevation: 338 m (1,109 ft) (a Marilyn)

Administration
- Council area: South Ayrshire
- Country: Scotland
- Sovereign state: United Kingdom

Demographics
- Population: 0

Ailsa Craig (/ˈeɪlsə/; Scottish Gaelic: Creag Ealasaid) is an island of 99 ha (1 km^{2}; 245 acres) in the outer Firth of Clyde, 16 km (8 1/2 nmi) west of mainland Scotland. The island's microgranite has long been quarried to make curling stones. The now-uninhabited island comprises an eroded magmatic pluton formed during the same period of igneous activity as magmatic rocks on the nearby Isle of Arran.

The island, colloquially known as "Paddy's Milestone" because it is halfway between Belfast and Glasgow, was a haven for Catholics during the Scottish Reformation in the 16th century, but is today a bird sanctuary, providing a home for huge numbers of gannets and an increasing number of puffins.

== Etymology ==
The name Ailsa comes from the Gaelic Allasa(n), earlier Aldasain, which is of obscure origin. It has been suggested that it represents a contraction of allt Shasann, meaning "cliff of the Saxons" (cf. airer Saxan, "coastland of the Saxon", a name applied to southwestern Scotland in an early Gaelic text). The "Saxons" in question would be the Northumbrians, whose territory at one time extended as far north as the Forth and Clyde.

The island is known in modern Gaelic as Creag Ealasaid (Elizabeth's rock) or Ealasaid a' Chuain (Elizabeth of the ocean); these, however, represent folk etymological alterations of Allasa, the "true name" of the island, which remained in use in Arran, the nearest Gaelic-speaking district, into the 20th century. The same applies to Carraig Alastair (Alexander's rock), an Irish name for Ailsa Craig.

The island is sometimes known as "Paddy's Milestone", being approximately the halfway point of the sea journey from Belfast to Glasgow, a traditional route of emigration for many Irish labourers going to Scotland to seek work. The Bass Rock is sometimes nicknamed "the Ailsa Craig of the East", although its prominence in the Firth of Forth is not as great as that of Ailsa Craig in the Firth of Clyde.

=== Placenames ===
A number of features and places on the island have acquired names, Gaelic in most cases, such as Craigna'an (cliff of birds); Trammins (place of Elder trees); Balvar (big round cliff); Garryloo (rough hill) and Ashydoo (black hill). The Swine Cave may take its name from a time when the Earl of Cassillis received part of his rent in hogs from the island.

== Geography and geology ==
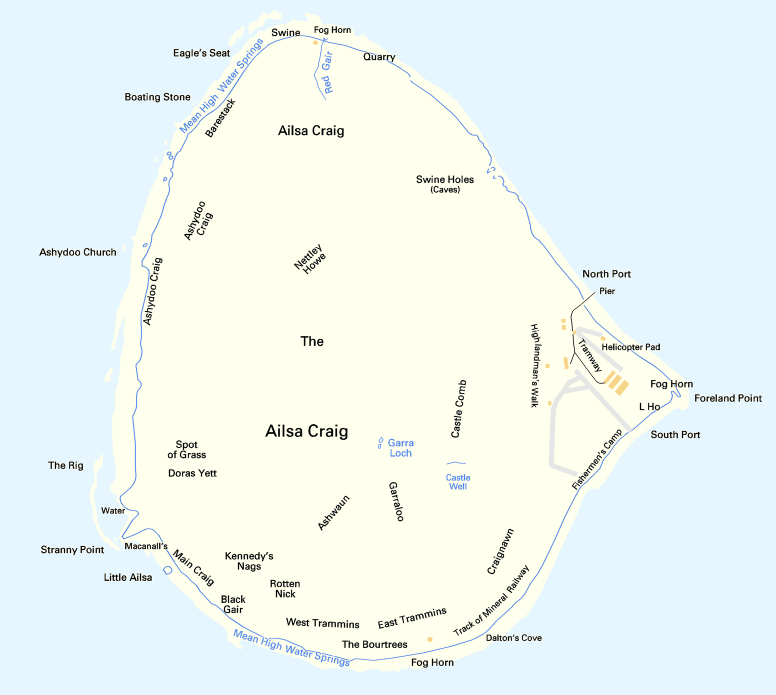
Map of Ailsa Craig

The island is approximately 16 km (8 1/2 nmi) west of Girvan; it is 4 km (2 1/2 mi) in circumference and rises to a height of 340 m (1,120 ft). The island is part of the administrative district of South Ayrshire, in the ancient parish of Dailly.

Geologically, Ailsa Craig comprises the remains of a Palaeogene pluton. Its prominence is due to the microgranite's hardness, making it more resistant to erosion than the surrounding Permian and Triassic sedimentary rocks into which it was intruded. The microgranite is itself intruded by a series of olivine dolerite dykes. Ailsa Craig, along with neighbouring Arran, is part of the North Atlantic Igneous Province, a widespread system of magmatic rocks formed during the initial stages of the opening of the North Atlantic Ocean. Boulders of distinctive Ailsa Craig microgranite known as erratics were transported by glaciers as far afield as County Donegal and Pembrokeshire.

The microgranite's unusual low-aluminium composition and crystalline texture make it particularly hard and resistant to impact, making this rock a favoured material for the manufacture of curling stones. The "blue hone" variety is now used for the lower part of the stone which contacts the ice (the running band) while the "common green" variety is used to make the body of the stone (including the striking band). A third variety, "red hone", is similar to blue hone but has now been exhausted.

== Facilities ==
The only surviving buildings on the island are the lighthouse on its east coast facing the Scottish mainland, a ruined towerhouse built by Clan Hamilton to protect the area from Philip II of Spain in the 16th century, and the old quarry manager's house that is used by the RSPB.

The island has a fresh-water spring but no electricity, gas, sewage or telephone connections.

The chief well on the island lies above 'the Loups', and this was used by the Northern Lighthouse Board which built a cistern there and piped the water to the lighthouse complex. The 'Horse Well' was located behind the gasworks; the 'Castle Well' stands above Ailsa Castle, and finally the Garry Loch sits higher up and once supplied water to the tenant's cottage.

Fishermen seem to have used the island for centuries, first being noted in 1549 and it is recorded that they even at one time slept beneath sails stretched over hollows on the beach.

A row of fishermen's cottages was under construction in the 1840s. However, the main developer died, and the project was abandoned, with the area used instead as a walled kitchen garden until the gasworks was built.

== Owners ==
The island seems to have been a part of the Barony of Knockgarron that lay in the Parish of Dailly and the then holder, Duncan of Turnberry, Earl of Carrick, established the abbey of Crossraguel and endowed it with the island of Ailsa Craig to "provide for their table". The barony passed through several hands until it became the property of the third Earl of Cassillis in 1548.

Apart from 2 ha (5 acres) sold to the Northern Lighthouse Board in 1883, since the 16th century the island has belonged to the Earls of Cassillis. In 1831, Archibald Kennedy, 12th Earl of Cassillis, was created the first Marquess of Ailsa, taking the title from Ailsa Craig.

In May 2011, Charles Kennedy, 8th Marquess of Ailsa, put the island up for sale with an asking price of £2,500,000. An alcoholic, Lord Ailsa had inherited only the peerages and the island, which his father had believed he would never sell. As of March 2013, it was unsold and the price was "offers over £1,500,000". It was reported in December 2013 that an unnamed environmental trust had placed a formal bid, and in April 2014 the National Trust for Scotland was reported to be considering a bid. In the event, to save the island for the family, David Kennedy, the future 9th Marquess bought it. As of 2020, the island was still owned by the 9th Marquess and was leased to the Royal Society for the Protection of Birds until 2050.

Four cottages, a shed, a railway, a winch house, the main pier, and an area of adjacent land are now in the ownership of the Scottish Indian businessman Bobby Sandhu. Mr Sandhu purchased this registered title buildings and land for £85,000 from the Argyll Group plc. Mr Sandhu stated he wished to build a five-star hotel on the land (Title: AYR24617). However, the planning system apparently prevented this development.

== History ==
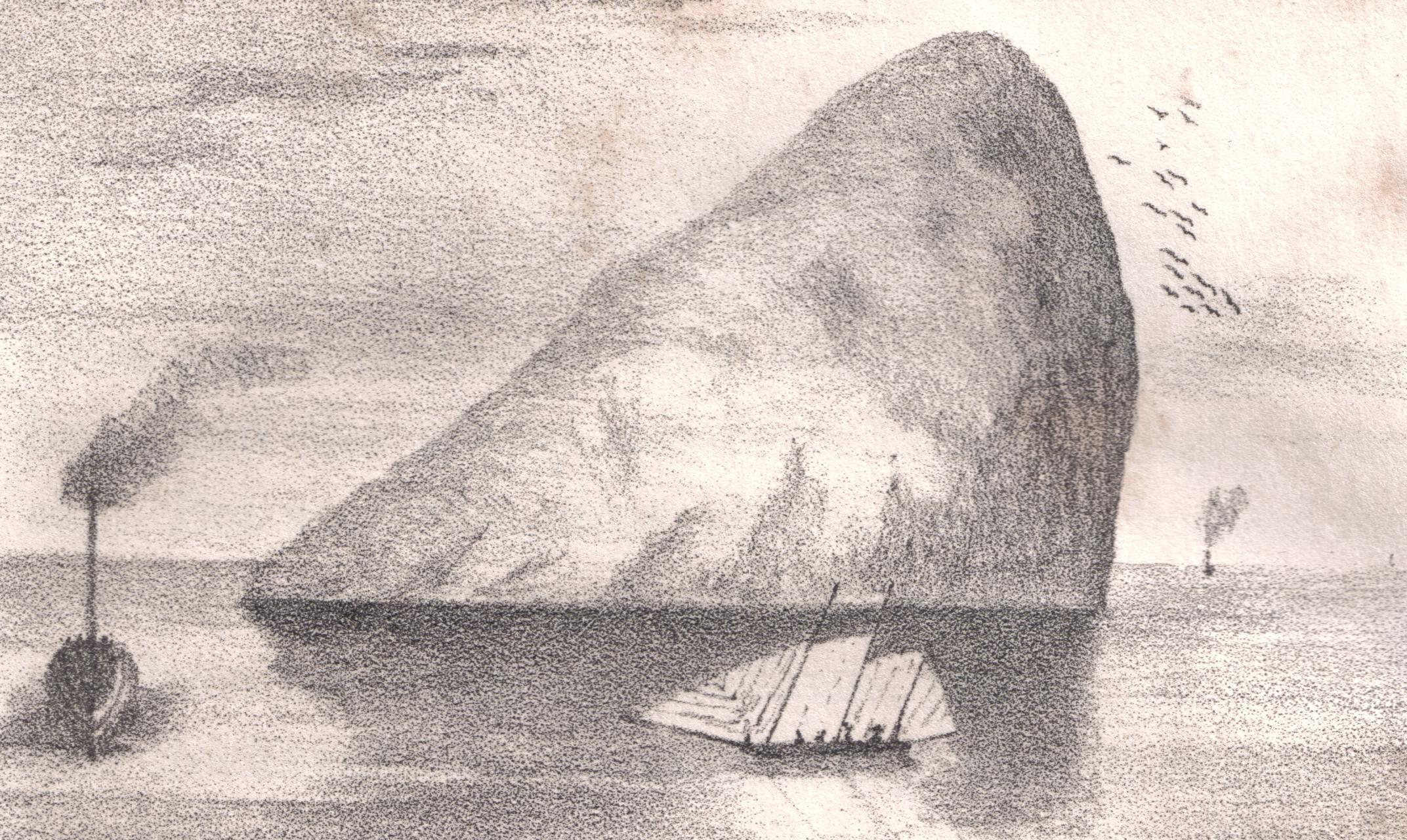
Ailsa Craig as drawn in the 1840s

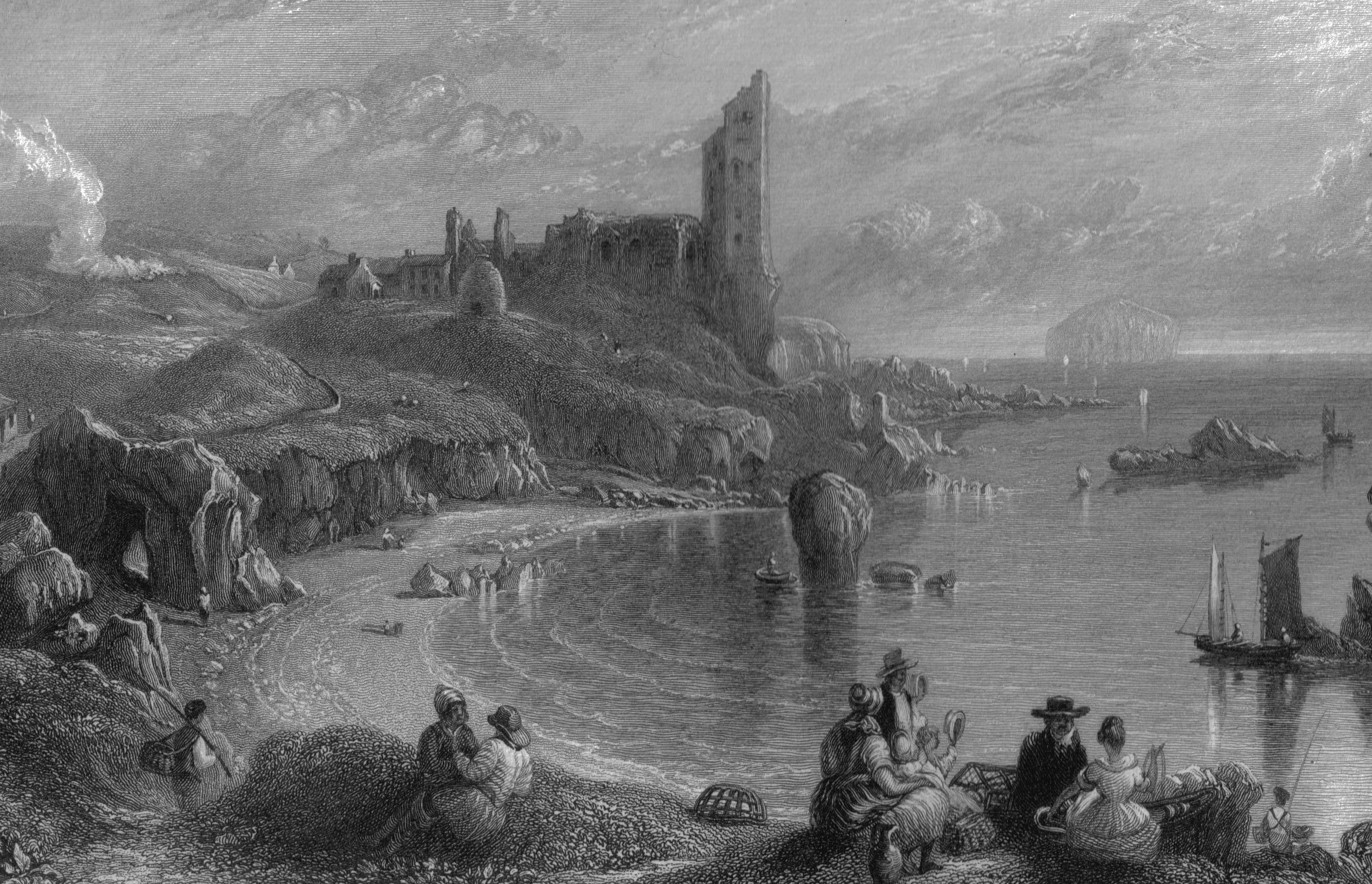
Ailsa Craig in the background with Dunure in 1840

In 1590 the shipping of the Clyde was disrupted by pirates who were said to be Highlanders, quha lyis about Ailsay.

Margaret Girvan ran a tearoom in a wooden building that stood next to the tacksman's cottage, famed for its pristine white table cloths and fresh scones. Girvan kept goats in stone-built goat rees or pens on the good grazing near Garry Loch. The feral billy goats were wont to interfere with these nanny goats and this was another reason for their demise.

An annual hunt of the solan geese or gannets took place in the days of Robert Burns as the flesh was considered a delicacy. Robert Burns's maternal uncle Samuel Burns was involved in the solan goose trade.

=== Ailsa Castle ===
The 12 m (39 ft) high ruins of a 3-storey castle that stands on the eastern side of the island was built in the late 1500s by the Hamilton Family to protect the island from King Philip II of Spain. The island was used as a prison during the 18th and 19th centuries. The castle has two vaulted storeys and an oven is located in a cellar with evidence of a spiral stairway that once ran to the top of the tower. Three cinquefoils arranged in a 'V' shape are carved on the tower and indicate that the Hamiltons were linked with the structure. There are indications of an adjoining building that ran to the north.

=== Spanish invasion ===
Ailsa Craig was a haven for Roman Catholics during the Scottish Reformation. In about 1587 the prominent Catholic Lord Maxwell landed on Ailsa while attempting to escape his pursuers and finding a fishing boat he attempted to reach Crossraguel Abbey, but was captured. In 1597 another Catholic supporter, Hugh Barclay of Ladyland, took possession of Ailsa Craig which he was intent on using as a place of safety for Catholics to practise their faith, for provisioning and stopping off point for a Spanish invasion which would re-establish the Catholic faith in Scotland and a storehouse for provisioning the Catholic Earl of Tyrone in Ireland.

Hugh was however discovered by The Rev. Andrew Knox, a Protestant minister (who later became both Lord Bishop of the Isles and Lord Bishop of Raphoe). Barclay thereafter deliberately drowned himself in the sea or did so accidentally whilst trying to escape. Another version states that Andrew Knox lay in wait for Hugh with nineteen others and ambushed him at the shingle beach with the result that he attempted to defend himself until he was forced back into the sea and drowned.

=== Smuggling ===
Beneath the Main Craig at the southern end of the island and 12 metres (39 ft) above sea level is a cave named after the supposed smuggler MacNall. When the cave was being cleared of guano many years ago, two stone coffins were found, both containing human bones. The Rev. Roderick Lawson (1831–1907) thought that one of the interments might be MacNall himself, but no details of this individual have yet come to light. Ailsa Craig would have been an ideal place for the temporary hiding of contraband goods.

=== Chapels ===
The island had two chapels and Thomas Pennant who visited Ailsa Craig in 1772 recorded that the ruins of a small chapel were located near the landing place and that another chapel (which he did not visit) was located on the summit of the island and was probably used by seamen to pray for safe voyages and returns. Lawson sees this second chapel as being a myth. When the lighthouse was being constructed, four stone coffins were found that may well have been associated with the first mentioned chapel, two at the tenant's house and two at the gasholder site. The monks of Crossraguel Abbey once held the island and "places of prayer" are therefore to be expected especially with a garrisoned castle nearby; even the diminutive Lady Isle off Troon once had a chapel. The chapel was first mentioned, along with the castle, in 1580 by Sir James Balfour.

=== Lighthouse, foghorns and gasworks ===
The Lighthouse was built between 1883 and 1886 by Thomas Stevenson; it is owned by the Northern Lighthouse Board.

The lighthouse was automated in 1990 and converted to solar electric power in 2001; the island has been uninhabited since automation in 1990. Ailsa Craig and its lighthouse feature extensively in Peter Hill's 2003 book Stargazing: Memoirs of a Young Lighthouse Keeper.

Two substantial foghorns with concrete housings were built in 1866, one at the north end of the island near the Swine Cave reached by 'the Loups' path and the other at East Trammins on the south end. Both were powered by compressed air that was piped from the lighthouse, where a gas-powered compressor was housed until 1911 when oil-powered engines were installed. One of the compressed air pipelines can still be seen within 'the Loups' path that was constructed above it. The compressed air cylinders that held the required store of air are still prominent features, especially at the Trammins foghorn. Both foghorns were decommissioned in 1966 and a Tyfon fog signal was used until 1987 when improvements in ship navigation made it also redundant.

The gasworks are still a prominent feature on the island and the cable-powered tramway was partly built to haul wagons full of coal up to it from the North Port. Two gasholders held the coal gas that powered both the compressed air pump and the lighthouse light, however in 1911 the light was converted to incandescent lighting which was powered by electricity. The gasworks became redundant at this time. Lawson records that oil was used to produce the gas for the lighthouse light.

=== Railways ===
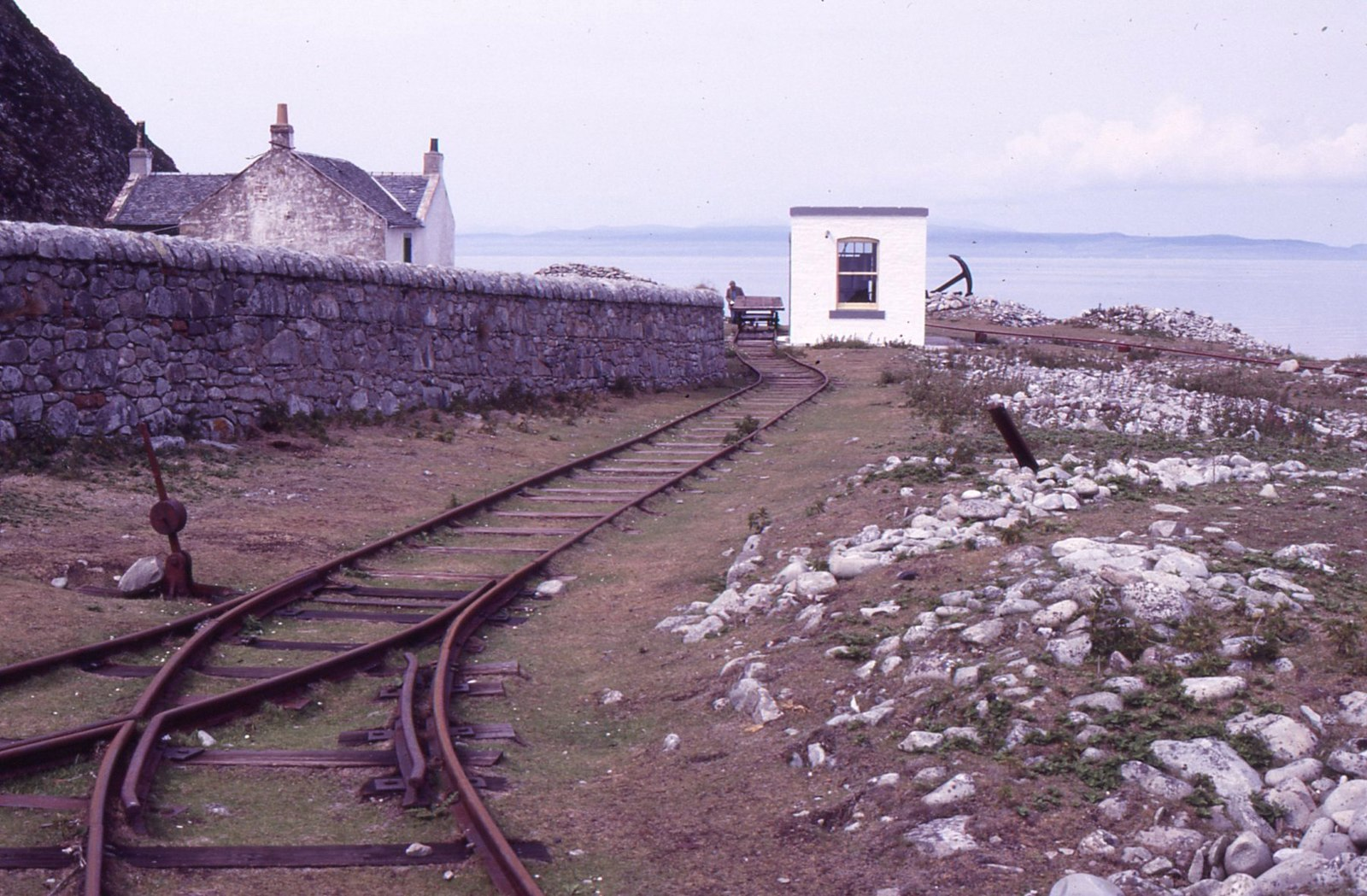
The tramway between the North Port and the lighthouse

Ailsa Craig had two quite separate rail transport systems: one dated from 1886 and supplied coal, oil fuel and provisions to the lighthouse and gasworks via the North Port and later the New Jetty, and the other transported road stone from the quarries at Kennedy's Nags via the stone crusher to the Quarry Pier. The Northern Lighthouse Board's tramway had a section worked via a powered cableway that hauled wagons up from the North Port and later from the new jetty.

This well-built tram line is largely intact and has a gauge of 914 mm (3 ft) with junction/points at the gasworks and a further set of points that led to a siding that ran down parallel to the gable end of the gasworks to presumably collect the coal ash for disposal. The main line runs on down to the lighthouse and its ancillary buildings, taking a right-angled bend to run parallel to the southern end of the lighthouse buildings block. This section of the line was worked by hand and at least two wagons remain at the site together with a set of spare wheels at the gasworks.

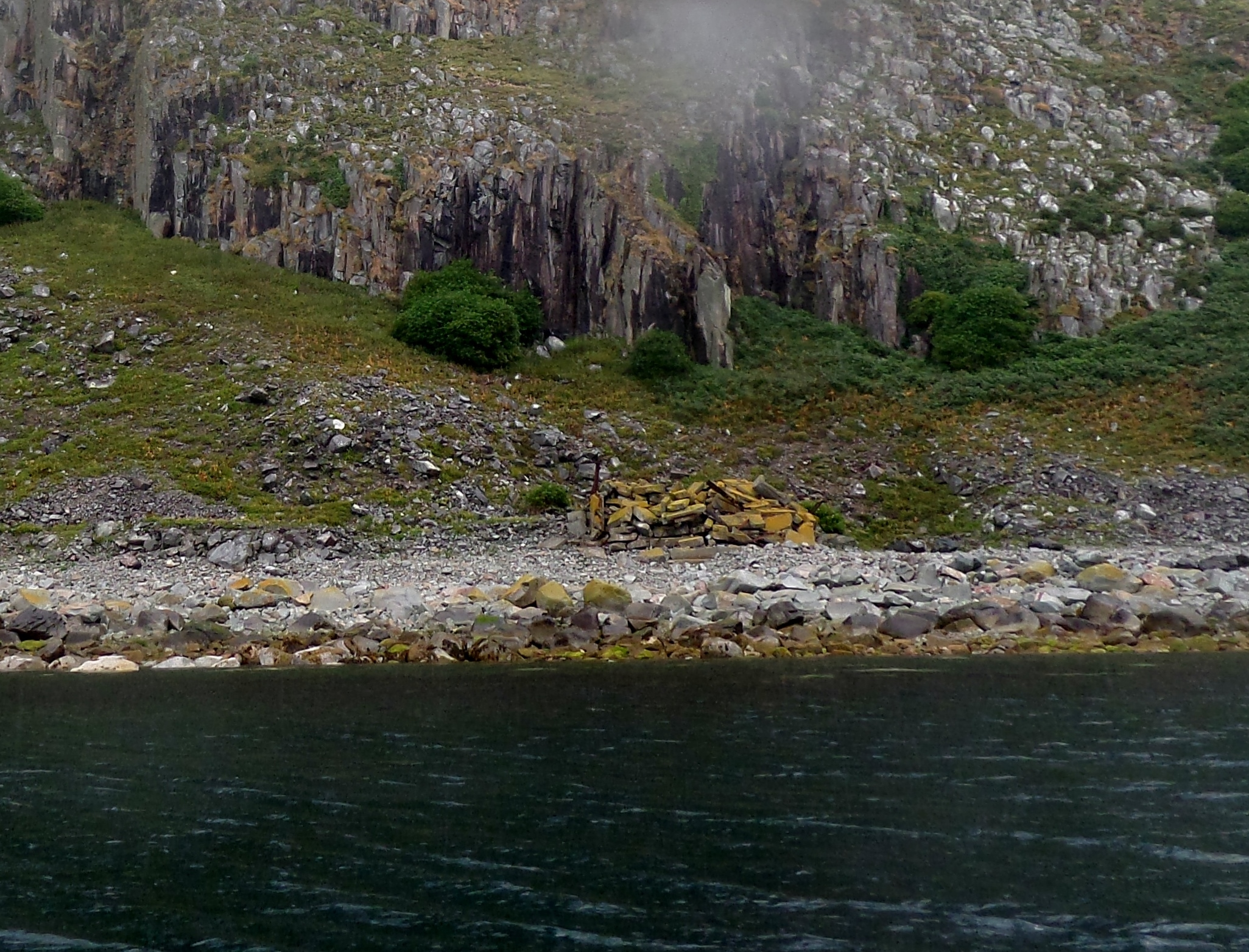
Remnants of the roadstone crusher near the south foghorn

The mineral line was built by the Ailsa Craig Granite Company Ltd. in 1909 and ran from the quarry at Kennedy's Nags via the stone crusher near the south foghorn to the Quarry Pier. This crudely constructed narrow gauge line was mainly horse drawn, although wagons were also moved by hand or hauled up inclines by winding engines. The mineral railway at the quarry end had a least one siding and a mobile steam crane loaded the larger granite blocks into the wagons that were transported to the stone crusher at the Trammins near the south foghorn, smaller stones being loaded and even moved by hand.

Wagons or bogies were winched up to the substantial stone crusher and gravity was used to deliver the different grades of road stone to the waggons below that were then hauled by horses to the Quarry Pier via a line that ran in front of the lighthouse buildings and took a tight right-angled bend to run up the substantial stone-built incline to the storage area in preparation for delivery via sea to the mainland. Kerb stones and stone railway sleepers for sections of the Scotch gauge horse-drawn railway from Ardrossan to Doura were also produced.

Photographs taken in the late 19th century show the horse-drawn wagons passing in front of the lighthouse and portray the substantial railway incline and storage area. At times the production outstripped the storage capacity and a photograph shows at least three piles of different grades of road stone stockpiled in front of the lighthouse enclosure. The track at the crusher had a siding that ran to the crusher and a set of points that led to the Quarry Pier main line.

The Ailsa Craig Granite Company was never a financially sound business and effectively closed in 1928. The course of the mineral line is still evident near the quarries as a linear embankment that ends below Kennedy's Nag. Various artefacts of the quarry enterprise remain, including concrete blocks at Kennedy's Nag and steel and concrete remnants of the stone crusher near the south foghorn.

== Curling stones ==
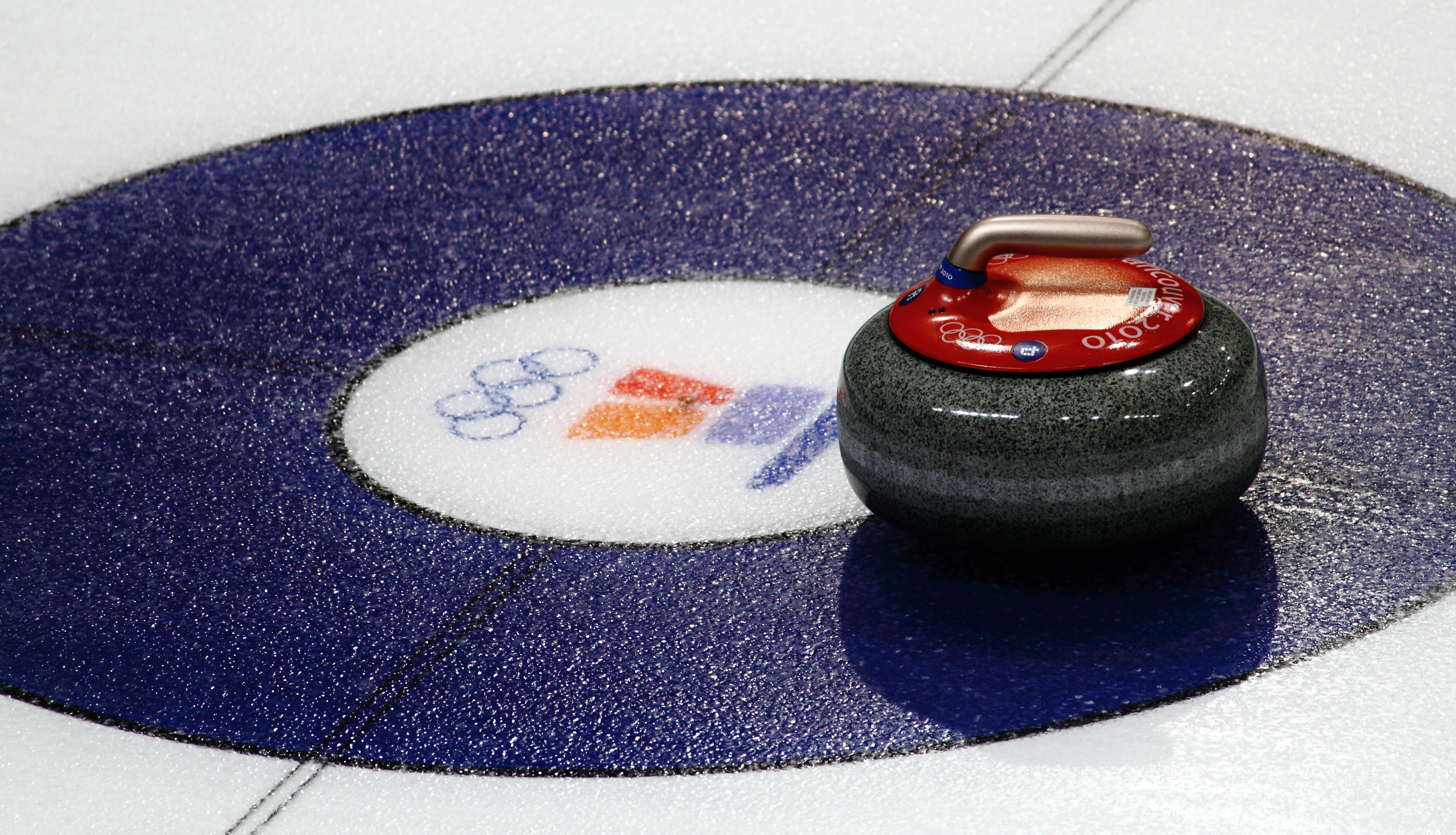
Curling stones used at the Winter Olympic Games are manufactured by Kays of Scotland with Ailsa Craig granite

From the mid-nineteenth century the island has been quarried for its rare type of microgranite with riebeckite (known as "Ailsite"), which is used to make stones for the sport of curling. As of 2004, 60–70% of all curling stones in use were made from granite from the island and it is one of only two sources for all stones in the sport, the other being the Trefor Granite Quarry in Wales.

Ailsa Craig produced two types of granite for curling, Blue Hone and Ailsa Craig Common Green. Blue Hone, which is unique to Ailsa Craig, has very low water absorption, which prevents the action of repeatedly freezing water from eroding the stone. In the past, most curling stones were made from Blue Hone but the quarry is restricted by environmental conditions that exclude blasting.

Kays of Scotland has been making curling stones since 1851 and has the exclusive rights to the Ailsa Craig granite, granted by the Marquess of Ailsa. A "harvest" of Ailsa Craig granite by Kays took place in 2013, after a hiatus of 11 years; 2,000 tonnes were harvested, sufficient to fill anticipated orders until at least 2020. A subsequent harvest was held in the winter of 2020. The curling stones produced by Kays of Scotland with Ailsa Craig granite are the only curling stones approved for use in the Winter Olympic Games.

== Natural history ==
Sea eagles or erne nested at the Bare Stack until 1881 when the tenant shot the last specimen, which is preserved at Culzean Castle.

Pennant and others have noted that the only trees growing on the island are elders (Sambucus nigra) or bourtrees in the Scots dialect, found as a grove known as The Bourtrees at the Trammins on the southern end of the island. This visitor also rather quaintly mentions that he was surprised to find three species of "reptiles" by which he meant molluscs, namely a naked black slug, the garden snail Cornu aspersum and one of the common striped snails of the genus Cepaea. He speculated that they had accidentally been brought over from the mainland secreted within vegetables.

Slowworms (Anguis fragilis) are found on the island, although they suffered greatly when badgers and raccoons were introduced by Lord Ailsa. The badgers did not survive long, but the raccoons bred for a number of years.

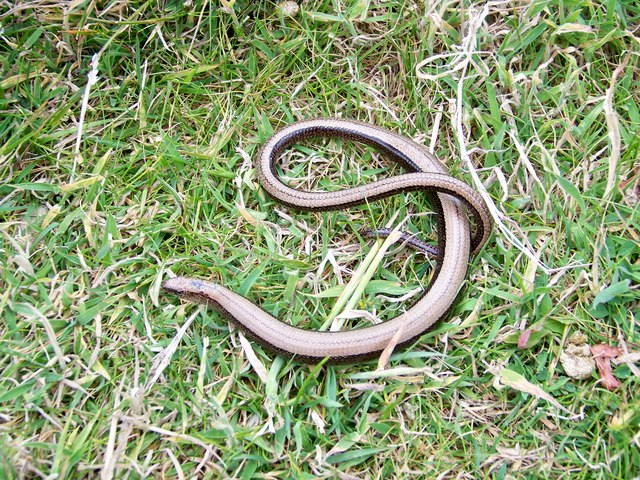
A slowworm on the island

The mammal fauna included rabbits, and at one time goats, whilst pigs were bred here as food for the inhabitants. The billy goats were shot for sport in the 19th century and no longer survive; only a mounted head of one remains at the McKechnie Institute in Girvan. The rabbits and goats may have been originally introduced to supply food for the fishermen and were mentioned by Pennant in 1772 and by the Rev Abercummie in 1688, who called them by the old name of coneys.

The island is now a bird sanctuary, leased by the RSPB until 2050. A large colony of gannets nest here.

Rats were probably introduced via shipwrecks; supposedly, a coal boat that sank offshore was the first culprit and caused great harm to the nesting bird populations, with the puffins proving vulnerable to the extent of extinction as breeding birds. After a long campaign using pioneering techniques, the rats were eradicated in 1991, and now puffins are once again raising young on the island with many other benefits accruing to both the fauna and the flora.

In a small glen above Ailsa Castle, a small freshwater body known as the Garry Loch is located at an altitude of 247 m (810 ft), with a depth of at least 5.2 metres (17 ft).

== Accidents ==
Lawson in the 1890s records that a young lady once fell over the cliff near Craig Na'an; however, her Victorian style garments caught the wind like a parachute and she escaped with her life and some broken bones that soon knitted back together. A visitor in a group from Stranraer was not so lucky and fell to his death on his way down from the summit.

A shocking death was that of a young boy from Girvan who was sitting amongst loose rocks, pulling out stones and throwing them into the sea, when a very large boulder started to move and crushed him. The stone was too heavy to shift and help from the mainland was required to extract the body of the unfortunate victim. In 1887 a ten-year-old boy died whilst collecting eggs at the West Craigs.

== See also ==
- List of islands of Scotland
- Ailsa Craig tomato
