= Saltcoats Town Hall =

Municipal building in Saltcoats, Scotland

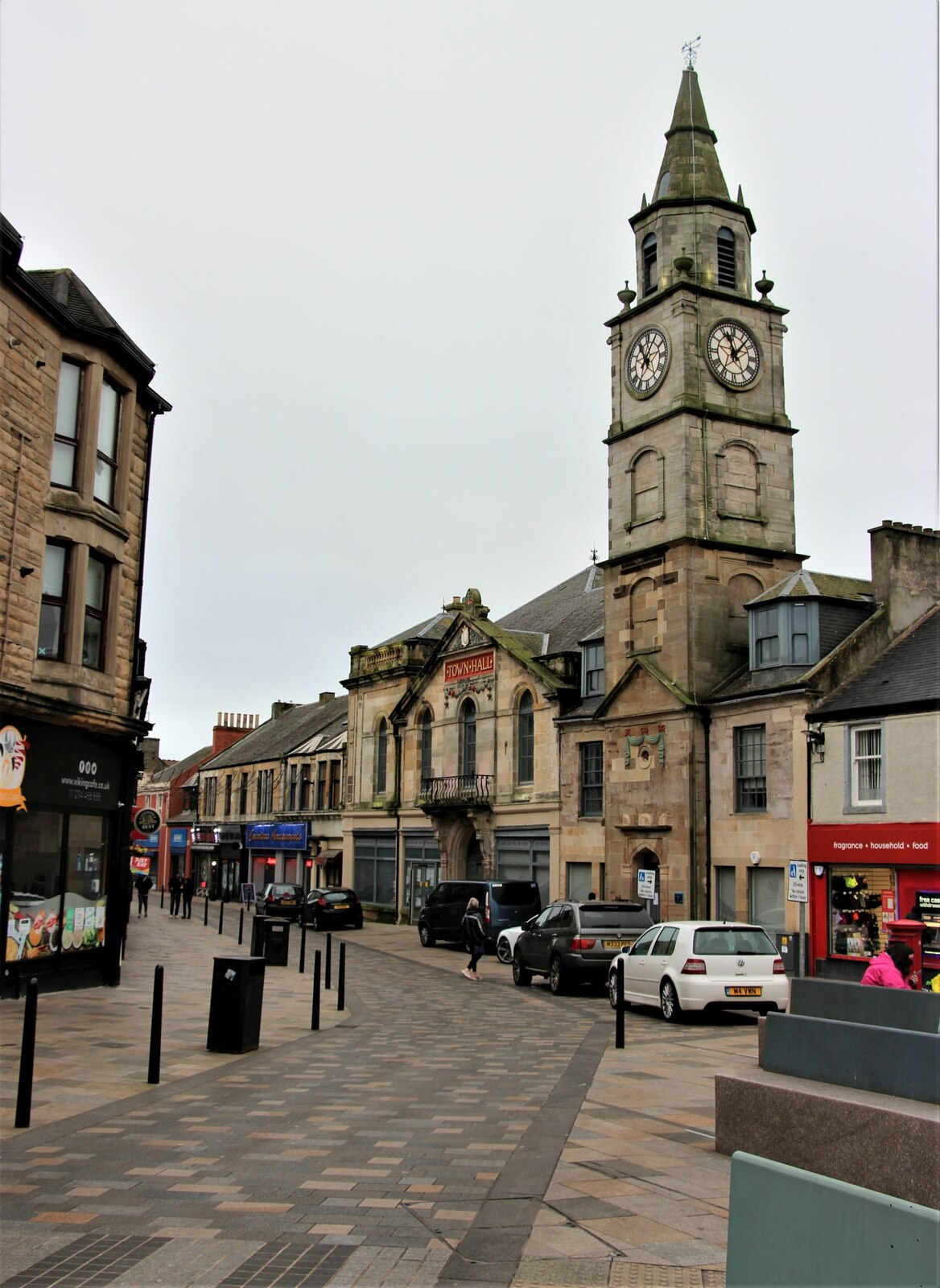
- Saltcoats Town Hall in 2022

- Shown in North Ayrshire
- 55.6332°N 4.7851°W
- Location: Countess Street, Saltcoats

History
- Built: 1826

Site notes
- Architect: Peter King
- Architectural style: Scottish baronial style

Listed Building – Category B
- Official name: Town Hall, Countess Street
- Designated: 26 February 1980
- Reference no.: LB40489

Saltcoats Town Hall is a municipal building and former cinema in Countess Street, Saltcoats, North Ayrshire, Scotland. The building, which is used by North Ayrshire Council as a hub for the delivery of local services, is a Category B listed building.

== History ==
The first municipal building in the town was a medieval tolbooth in Girnal Close; it had deteriorated to such extent that it was abandoned by the early 18th century.

The earliest part of the current complex, the town house, was financed by public subscription. It was designed by Peter King in the Scottish baronial style, built in ashlar stone and was completed in 1826. The design involved a symmetrical main frontage with three bays facing onto Countess Street; the central bay, which slightly projected forward, featured a five-stage tower. There was an ogee-shaped doorway flanked by pilasters supporting a cornice with acroteria on the ground floor, an oculus flanked by swags and surmounted by a pediment on the first floor, niches on the second and third floors and a clock on the fourth floor, with an octagonal lantern and spire above. The outer bays contained shop fronts on the ground floor, sash windows on the first floor and canted dormer windows on the second floor. Internally, the principal rooms were a courtroom on the first floor and a prison cell on the second floor. In the 1870s, the artist John Lavery spent part of his childhood living in the town house.

In the late 19th century, the burgh leaders decided to augment the town house by erecting a public hall on an adjacent site to the south which was occupied by the parish school. This part of the complex, the town hall, was designed by Howie and Walton of Glasgow in the Renaissance style, built in ashlar stone and was officially opened on 22 October 1892. The design involved a symmetrical main frontage with three bays facing onto Countess Street with an additional bay to the left: the central bay, which slightly projected forward, featured a round headed doorway with a fanlight flanked by pilasters supporting a balcony. There were three rounded headed windows on the first floor and a large open pediment above. The main pediment contained a panel decorated with swags, bearing the inscription "Town Hall" and surmounted by a smaller pediment containing a cartouche in the tympanum.

The town was advanced from the status of burgh of barony to small burgh in 1930, but, because of the limited space available in the town house, the burgh leaders chose to establish the town clerk's office in Montgomerie Crescent. In the 1920s, the town hall became a cinema, known as the "Countess Picture Theatre" or "Countess Cinema". It continued in that role until 1972, when it was closed following a decline in the demand for cinema seats. The condition of the complex was allowed to deteriorate in the early part of the 21st century and the building closed completely in July 2010. An extensive programme of refurbishment works was initiated in 2015 to restore it for use by North Ayrshire Council as a hub for the delivery of local services. The works were undertaken to a design by McLean Architects and Wellwood Leslie at a cost of £3.7 million. The building was officially re-opened by the First Minister, Nicola Sturgeon, on 14 March 2016.

== See also ==
- List of listed buildings in Saltcoats, North Ayrshire
