= List of listed buildings in Saltcoats, North Ayrshire =

This is a list of listed buildings in the parish of Saltcoats in North Ayrshire, Scotland.

== List ==
Name	Location	Date Listed	Grid Ref. (Note: Sometimes known as OSGB36, the grid reference (where provided) is based on the British national grid reference system used by the Ordnance Survey. • "Guide to National Grid". Ordnance Survey. • "Get-a-map". Ordnance Survey.)	Geo-coordinates	Notes	LB Number (Note: Historic Environment Scotland assign a unique alphanumeric identifier to each designated site in Scotland, for listed buildings this always begins with "LB", for example "LB12345".)	Image
Chapelwell Street, New Trinity Church, (Former Erskine, Church Of Scotland) With Hall, Boundary Walls, Gatepiers And Railings				55°38′04″N 4°47′18″W	Category C(S)	44718	Upload Photo
6 Hamilton Street				55°38′01″N 4°47′25″W	Category C(S)	40505	Upload Photo
28 Hamilton Street				55°38′03″N 4°47′27″W	Category C(S)	40515	Upload Photo
46 Hamilton Street				55°38′05″N 4°47′30″W	Category C(S)	40523	Upload Photo
56 Hamilton Street				55°38′06″N 4°47′30″W	Category C(S)	40527	Upload Photo
58 Hamilton Street				55°38′07″N 4°47′29″W	Category B	40528	Upload Photo
66 Hamilton Street				55°38′07″N 4°47′31″W	Category C(S)	40532	Upload Photo
St Cuthbert's Parish Church				55°38′16″N 4°47′31″W	Category B	40488	Upload Photo
1 Parkend Avenue (Kyleshill House)				55°38′03″N 4°46′53″W	Category B	40493	Upload Photo
Saltcoats Station Station Road And Glencairn Road				55°38′02″N 4°47′03″W	Category B	40500	Upload another image
14 Hamilton Street				55°38′02″N 4°47′25″W	Category C(S)	40509	Upload Photo
40 Hamilton Street				55°38′05″N 4°47′28″W	Category C(S)	40520	Upload Photo
14 Nineyard Street				55°38′00″N 4°47′01″W	Category C(S)	40494	Upload Photo
19 Raise Street				55°38′06″N 4°47′03″W	Category C(S)	40499	Upload Photo
10 Hamilton Street				55°38′01″N 4°47′25″W	Category C(S)	40507	Upload Photo
32 Hamilton Street				55°38′04″N 4°47′27″W	Category B	40517	Upload Photo
E U Congregational Church, Hamilton Street				55°38′04″N 4°47′24″W	Category C(S)	40534	Upload Photo
Town Hall Countess Street				55°38′00″N 4°47′08″W	Category B	40489	Upload another image
26, 28 Countess Street				55°38′00″N 4°47′06″W	Category C(S)	40491	Upload Photo
Harbour				55°37′52″N 4°47′13″W	Category B	40496	Upload another image
20, 22 Hamilton Street				55°38′03″N 4°47′26″W	Category C(S)	40512	Upload Photo
30 Hamilton Street				55°38′04″N 4°47′27″W	Category C(S)	40516	Upload Photo
60 Hamilton Street				55°38′07″N 4°47′30″W	Category B	40529	Upload Photo
68 Hamilton Street				55°38′08″N 4°47′31″W	Category C(S)	40533	Upload Photo
8 Hamilton Street				55°38′01″N 4°47′24″W	Category C(S)	40506	Upload Photo
12 Hamilton Street				55°38′02″N 4°47′25″W	Category C(S)	40508	Upload Photo
16 Hamilton Street				55°38′02″N 4°47′26″W	Category C(S)	40510	Upload Photo
24 Hamilton Street				55°38′03″N 4°47′26″W	Category C(S)	40513	Upload Photo
26 Hamilton Street				55°38′03″N 4°47′26″W	Category C(S)	40514	Upload Photo
30 Countess Street				55°38′01″N 4°47′06″W	Category C(S)	40492	Upload Photo
15 Raise Street				55°38′05″N 4°47′03″W	Category C(S)	40497	Upload Photo
17 Raise Street				55°38′05″N 4°47′03″W	Category C(S)	40498	Upload Photo
Landsborough And Trinity Church Dockhead Street				55°38′00″N 4°47′16″W	Category C(S)	40501	Upload Photo
18 Hamilton Street				55°38′02″N 4°47′26″W	Category C(S)	40511	Upload Photo
34 Hamilton Street				55°38′04″N 4°47′27″W	Category C(S)	40518	Upload Photo
52, 52A Hamilton Street				55°38′05″N 4°47′30″W	Category C(S)	40525	Upload Photo
62 Hamilton Street				55°38′07″N 4°47′30″W	Category B	40530	Upload Photo
64 Hamilton Street				55°38′07″N 4°47′30″W	Category C(S)	40531	Upload Photo
36, 38 Hamilton Street				55°38′04″N 4°47′27″W	Category C(S)	40519	Upload Photo
54 Hamilton Street				55°38′06″N 4°47′30″W	Category C(S)	40526	Upload Photo
23 Manse Street				55°38′06″N 4°47′20″W	Category C(S)	40535	Upload Photo
Museum. Old Ardrossan Parish Church (Including Old Graveyard)				55°38′04″N 4°47′21″W	Category B	40487	Upload Photo
1 And 3 Countess Street (Savoy Cafe And M Kelly Fruiterer)				55°37′58″N 4°47′06″W	Category C(S)	40490	Upload Photo
Engine House In Field Close To Railway				55°38′05″N 4°46′15″W	Category B	40495	Upload Photo
87, 89 Dockhead Street				55°38′00″N 4°47′18″W	Category B	40502	Upload Photo
6 Chapelwell Street With 1, 3 Hamilton Street				55°38′01″N 4°47′21″W	Category B	40503	Upload Photo
4 Hamilton Street				55°38′01″N 4°47′24″W	Category C(S)	40504	Upload Photo
42 Hamilton Street				55°38′05″N 4°47′28″W	Category C(S)	40521	Upload Photo
44 Hamilton Street				55°38′05″N 4°47′30″W	Category C(S)	40522	Upload Photo
48, 50 Hamilton Street				55°38′05″N 4°47′30″W	Category C(S)	40524	Upload Photo

== Key ==
The scheme for classifying buildings in Scotland is:

- Category A: "buildings of national or international importance, either architectural or historic; or fine, little-altered examples of some particular period, style or building type."
- Category B: "buildings of regional or more than local importance; or major examples of some particular period, style or building type, which may have been altered."
- Category C: "buildings of local importance; lesser examples of any period, style, or building type, as originally constructed or moderately altered; and simple traditional buildings which group well with other listed buildings."

In March 2016 there were 47,288 listed buildings in Scotland. Of these, 8% were Category A, and 50% were Category B, with the remaining 42% being Category C.

== See also ==
- List of listed buildings in North Ayrshire
