= Mungo Fairgrieve =

Scottish educator, academic author and amateur meteorologist

Mungo McCallum Fairgrieve FRSE (1872-1937) was a Scottish educator, academic author and amateur meteorologist.

== Life ==
He was born on 30 October 1872 in Saltcoats on the Ayrshire coast. He attended both Glasgow University (entering in 1890 and studying under Lord Kelvin) and then Peterhouse, Cambridge, graduating with an M.A. in 1899.

In 1900 he began teaching Science at Eastbourne New College, then in 1903 returned to Scotland to Edinburgh Academy rising to Senior Master in 1913, retiring in 1935.

In 1910 he was elected a Fellow of the Royal Society of Edinburgh. His proposers were George Alexander Gibson, John Sturgeon Mackay, Peter Pinkerton and Andrew Watt. At this time he is listed as living at 67 Great King Street, a prestigious address in Edinburgh's Second New Town.

He was Vice President of the Scottish Meteorological Society and Scottish Secretary of the British Meteorological Society.

A keen mountaineer, he was crippled by a serious fall in 1935, his second serious accident in ten years. He died in Edinburgh on 4 August 1937.

== Publications ==
- Elementary Physics (1924) co-written with fellow teacher James Tudor Cundall

== Family ==
He was married to Helen Gifford.
