= Saltcoats =

Town in North Ayrshire, Scotland

Coordinates: 55.6352°N 04.7896°W

Saltcoats: Scottish Gaelic: Baile an t-Salainn; Scots: Saulcuts
- Town
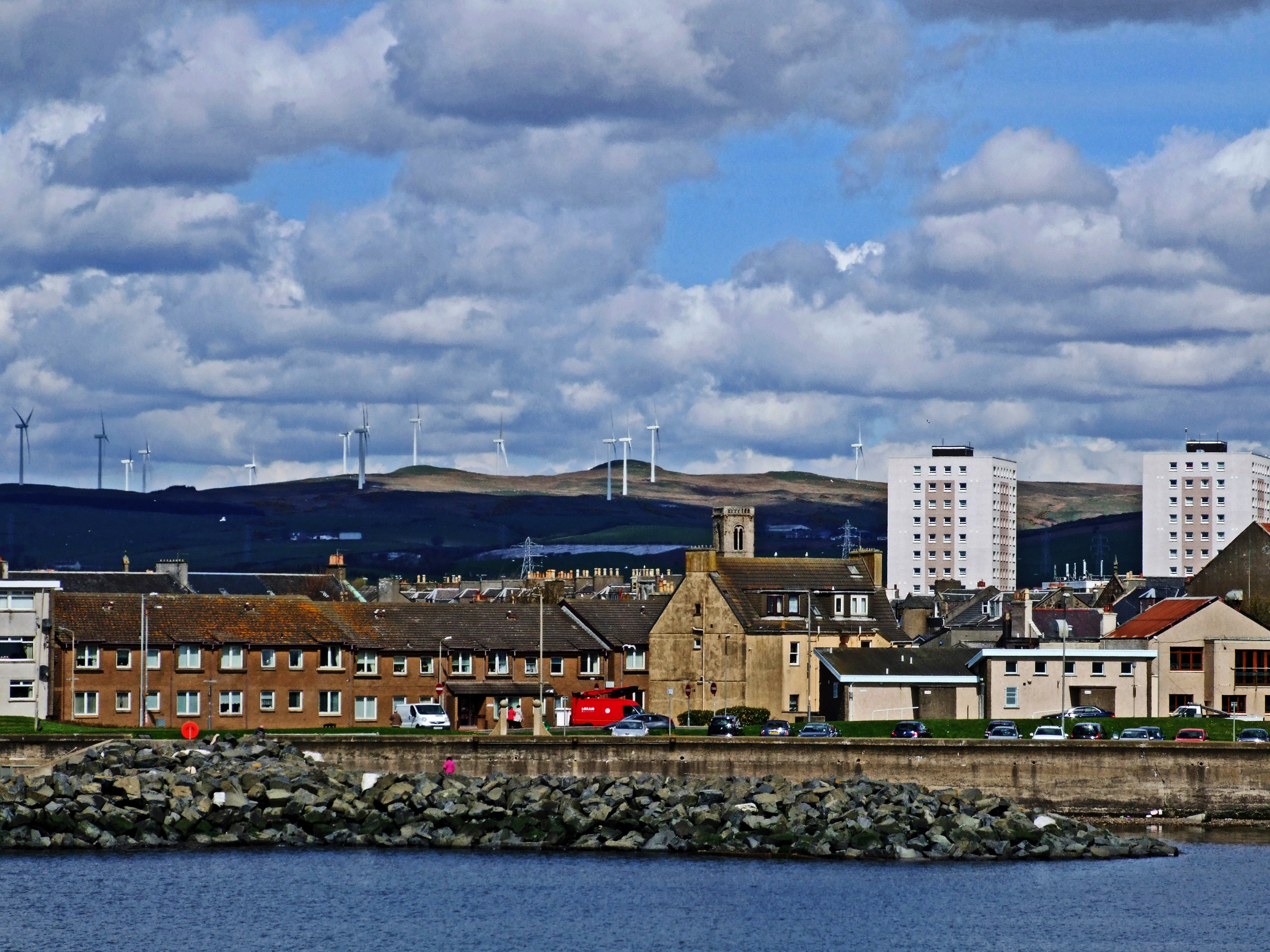
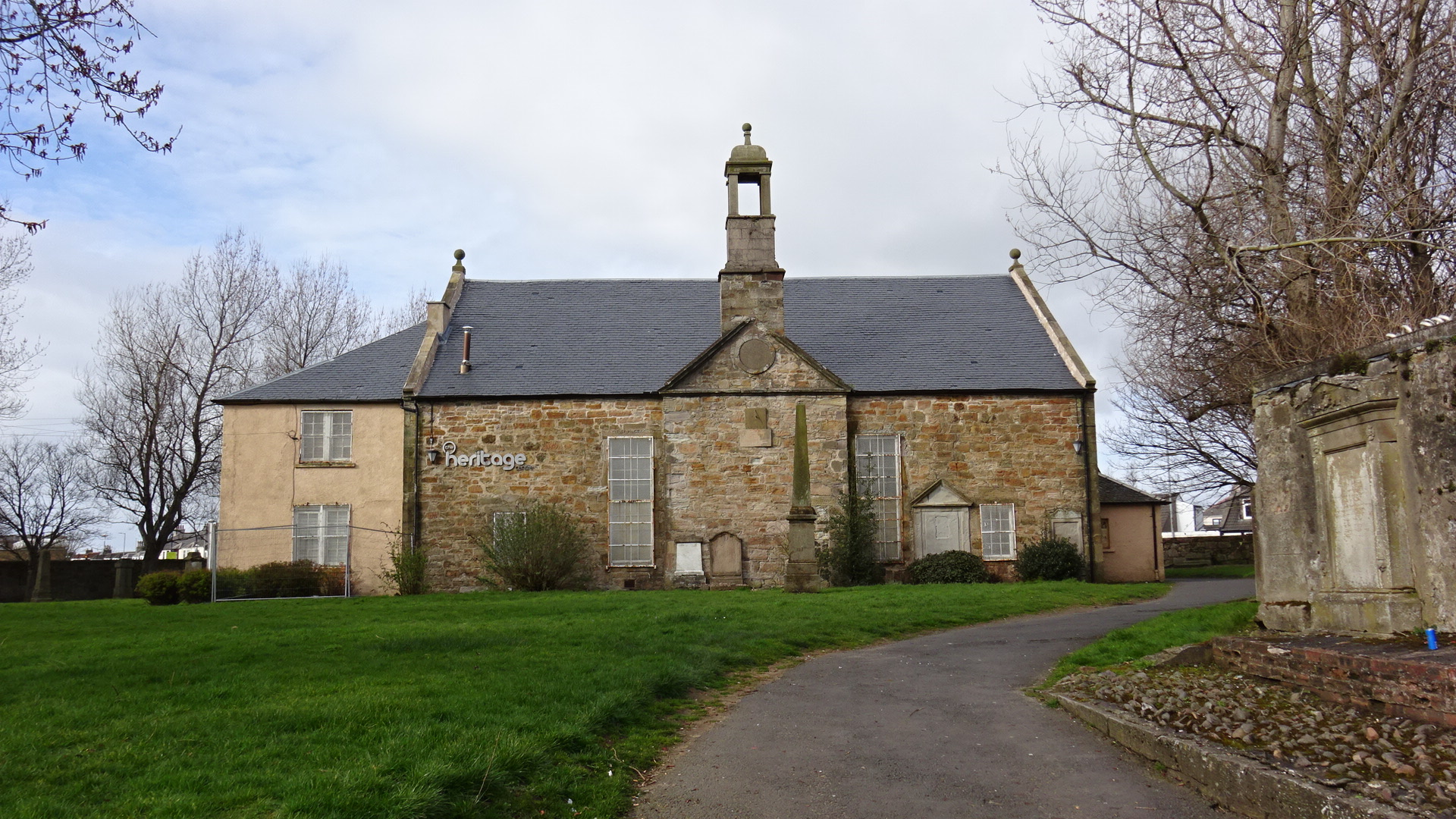
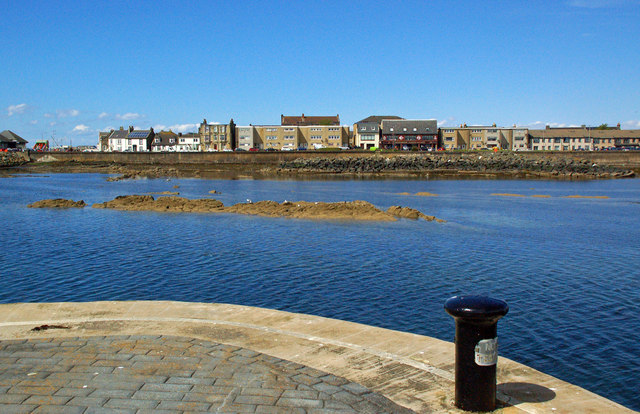
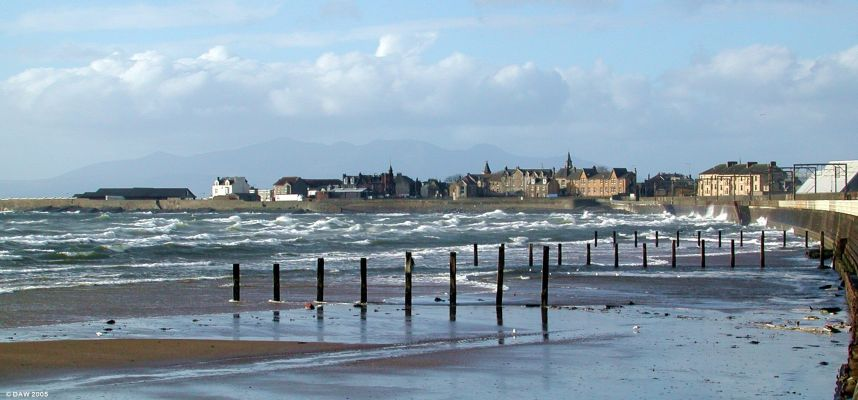
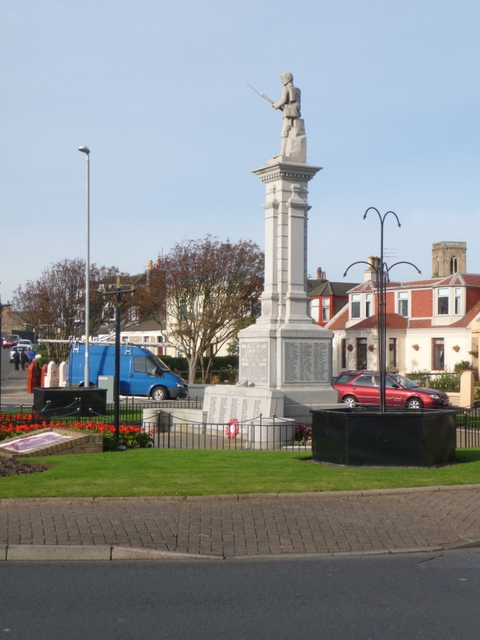
- From top, left to right: Saltcoats Prom, and townscape, the North Ayrshire Heritage Centre, Saltcoats Pier, Saltcoats sea front, Saltcoats War Memorial

- Location within North Ayrshire
- Population: 12,250 (2020)
  - Density: 3,489/sq km
- OS grid reference: NS245415
  - Edinburgh: 77.6 mi (124.9 km)
- Council area: North Ayrshire
- Lieutenancy area: Ayrshire and Arran
- Country: Scotland
- Sovereign state: United Kingdom
- Post town: SALTCOATS
- Postcode district: KA21
- Dialling code: 01294
- Police: Scotland
- Fire: Scottish
- Ambulance: Scottish
- UK Parliament: North Ayrshire and Arran
- Scottish Parliament: Cunninghame North

Saltcoats (Scottish Gaelic: Baile an t-Salainn; Scots: Saulcuts) is a town on the west coast of North Ayrshire, Scotland. The name is derived from the town's earliest industry when salt was harvested from the sea water of the Firth of Clyde, carried out in small cottages along the shore. It is part of the 'Three Towns' conurbation along with Ardrossan and Stevenston and is the third largest town in North Ayrshire.

== History ==
=== Origins, 1200s ===
The history of Saltcoats can be traced back to when the monks of Kilwinning Abbey discovered easily accessible coastal coal seams at Saltcoats in the 1200s, it expanded from small scattering of buildings. The coal proved an efficient source of heat for evaporating saltwater for the manufacturing of salt, and by the 1500s, King James V funded sheds along the shoreline, leading to a successful salt pans industry. This sector of the economy is where Saltcoats gets its name.

=== Burgh status, 1528 ===
In 1528, Saltcoats was granted status as a burgh leading to the creation of a market. By the middle of the 1600s, Saltcoats' primary sources of income were the import of corn and butter, as well as the sale of cattle and fish (mostly herring) to Ireland. Local farmers produced cheese, butter, wheat, oats, and potatoes. Cottage labourers in the town were given access to hand looms so they could weave muslins for the Glasgow and Paisley markets. On the outskirts of the town, chemical operations that produce magnesium and Epsom salts ran on waste materials from the salt-panning business.

In the late 18th century, several shipyards operated at Saltcoats, producing some 60 to 70 ships. The leading shipbuilder was William Ritchie, but in 1790 he moved his business to Belfast. In 1793, it was recorded that Saltcoats had around 400 houses, with three operational shipyards remaining. By 1820, this had climbed to 600 houses, with a population of 3,413 being noted.

=== Recent history ===
By the early 19th century, the town had stopped producing ships. Saltcoats Town Hall, which dates back to 1826, is a Category B listed building.

Saltcoats had various amenities, lodging, and entertainment required to develop into a prosperous seaside resort as a result of the vast, protected bay known as "South Beach" between Saltcoats and Ardrossan and a Beach Pavilion built in the 1920s. Its importance as a holiday destination declined with the onset of cheap air travel and mass summer migrations to the Mediterranean.

== Governance ==
Saltcoats is part of the North Ayrshire and Arran constituency in the House of Commons. From 2005, the seat was represented by Scottish Labour however, more recently in 2015, the seat was won by Patricia Gibson of the Scottish National Party. She was returned in 2017 albeit a smaller majority, but in 2019 her majority increased.

Historically, Saltcoats has been part of the UK parliament constituencies North Ayrshire (1868–1918), Bute and Northern Ayrshire (1918–1983) and Cunninghame North (1983–2005). These constituencies historically returned Conservative or Unionist MPs until 1987, when the constituency was won by the Labour Party.

For the devolved Scottish Parliament, the town is a part of the Cunninghame North constituency. This seat has been represented by Kenneth Gibson since the 2007 Scottish Parliament election, where it was the seat with the smallest majority at only 48 votes. It was previously represented by Scottish Labour since its creation in 1999.

== Transport ==
The harbour was designed by James Jardine in 1811, however no cargo or passenger services run from the harbour any more.

Saltcoats is served by regular bus and railway services. Primary bus services are provided by Stagecoach West Scotland, while rail services are operated by ScotRail. These rail services are frequent and serve nearby Glasgow, as well as Largs, Ardrossan and Kilwinning.

Although Saltcoats currently only has a single railway station, the town was once served by a second railway station located in the north of the town, originally as part of the Lanarkshire and Ayrshire Railway. This station ceased regular passenger services on 4 July 1932, and there is no trace of the station today bar a nearby bridge.

== Notable people ==
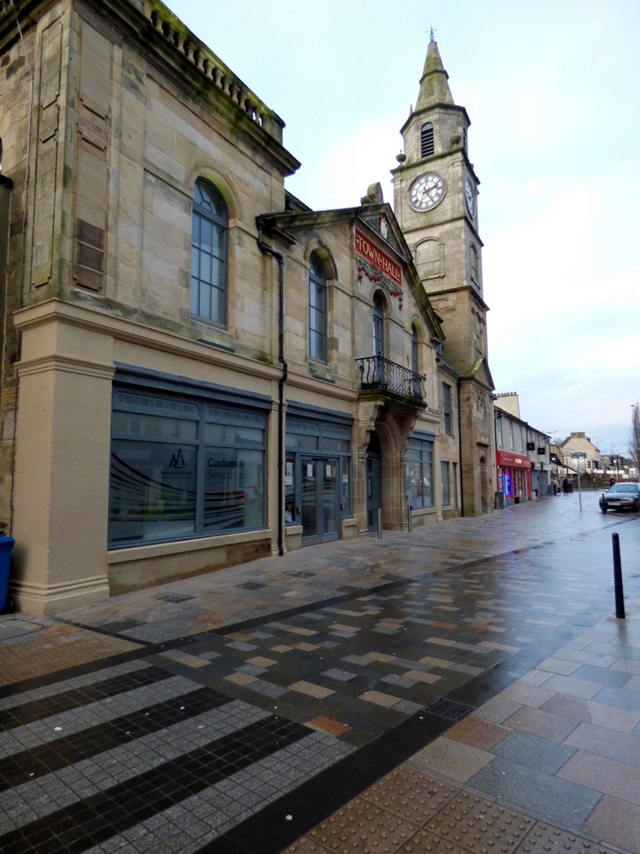
Saltcoats Town Hall

- Alexander Allan (1780–1854), founder of the Allan Line Royal Mail Steamers
- Andrew Allan (1822–1901), of the Allan Line Royal Mail Steamers
- Sir Hugh Allan (1810–82), of the Allan Line Royal Mail Steamers
- George Biagi (b.1985), Italian national rugby player
- William Burns (1809–76), historian
- Kenneth Campbell (1917–1941), recipient of the Victoria Cross
- Steve Clarke (b.1963), professional footballer, Scotland national team manager
- Paul Clarke (Scottish footballer) (b.1956), professional footballer
- Mungo Fairgrieve (1872–1937), educator and author
- Hamish Fraser (1913–1986), former communist, traditionalist Catholic writer and local councillor
- Janice Galloway (b.1955), author
- Michael Garrett (b.1964) inaugural Sir Bernard Lovell chair in astrophysics, Director of Jodrell Bank Centre for Astrophysics
- Colin Hay (b.1953), musician, singer-songwriter, leader of Men at Work
- Al Howie (1945–2016), long-distance runner
- Bobby Lennox (b.1943), professional footballer
- Fiona Macpherson (b.1971), philosopher
- James Manson (1845–1935), engineer
- Hugh McMahon (1906–97), professional footballer
- Betsy Miller (1792–1864), sea captain
- Hugh Munro (1856–1919), mountaineer, author
- Graeme Obree (b.1965), cyclist
- Robert Thornton (b.1967), professional darts player
