= List of political parties in Scotland =

This article lists political parties in Scotland. As of 2026, there are six main political parties in Scotland, each having political party representation in either the Scottish Parliament, House of Commons or at local government level. Prior to 2020, some political parties also had representatives in the European Parliament.

The largest political party by both membership numbers and number of MSPs in the Scottish Parliament is the Scottish National Party (SNP), a centre–left party which advocates for Scottish independence. The SNP is the party of government in Scotland, with leader John Swinney serving as First Minister of Scotland since May 2024. The SNP is also the largest party in local government. The Scottish Labour Party have the most number of Scottish seats in the House of Commons. Reform UK is the joint-second largest party in the Scottish Parliament with Scottish Labour. Smaller parties by representation include the Scottish Green Party, Scottish Conservatives and Scottish Liberal Democrats.

== Overview ==
The Scottish National Party (SNP) is the main political party in Scotland which primarily supports Scotland becoming an independent nation. They have also supported further devolution as a progression towards independence. They are overall centre-left, and sometimes considered big-tent, advocating social democracy, nuclear disarmament and closer ties to the European Union. They were founded in 1934 and formed a permanent grouping in House of Commons in 1967. Their best election result in the 20th century was at the general election of October 1974 in which they won 11 of Scotland's 72 Westminster seats as well as around 30% of the popular vote, however they lost all but two of these seats in 1979. Support for the party was bolstered under the leadership of Alex Salmond, who in 2011 led the SNP to their best electoral performance to date, in which they became the first party in the devolved Scottish Parliament to win a majority of seats. They form the Scottish government, and are now led by Scotland's First Minister, John Swinney. They have 58 Members of the Scottish Parliament (MSPs) and 9 Members of the Parliament of the United Kingdom (MPs).

Scottish Labour is the Scottish wing of the Great Britain-wide Labour Party. It was the most successful party in Scottish elections from 1964 to 2007. Like the wider UK Labour Party, they are centre-left, and they promote British unionism. They first overtook the Conservatives as Scotland's largest party at the 1959 general election. In 1997, the UK Labour Party under Tony Blair offered Scotland a referendum on devolution, which was passed with around 74% of the electorate in favour. From 1999 to 2007, they were in power in the Scottish Parliament through a coalition with the Liberal Democrats. From 2008 to 2011, the party was led by Iain Gray in the Scottish Parliament, who announced his resignation after the party's defeat at the 2011 Scottish election. Johann Lamont became leader in 2011 and resigned in 2014 after an internal dispute within the party. Subsequently, they were led by Jim Murphy, Kezia Dugdale and Richard Leonard. They currently have 37 MPs and 17 MSPs. As of 2021 they are led by Anas Sarwar MSP.

Reform UK Scotland is the Scottish wing of the UK-wide Reform UK. It is a Eurosceptic and right-wing populist party, sitting between the right-wing and far-right of the left-right spectrum. The party gained its first elected representative in January 2021, when sitting independent MSP Michelle Ballantyne joined and became the party's leader in Scotland. Ballantyne was previously a Conservative MSP. She resigned from the party in November 2020, citing differences with the new leader, Douglas Ross before joining. Ballantyne lost this seat in the 2021 Scottish Parliament election, leaving the party with no elected representatives in Scotland until 2025 when Graham Simpson defected from the Scottish Conservatives. At the 2026 Scottish Parliament Election, the party gained its first elected representatives, winning the joint second-highest number of seats alongside Scottish Labour. As of May 2026, the parliametnary group consists of 17 MSPs and is led by Malcolm Offord.

The Scottish Greens sit between the centre-left and the left-wing of the left-right spectrum. The party promotes green politics, Scottish independence, equality and radical democracy, with considerable socialist influences. It retains close ties with the Green Party of England and Wales and the Green Party Northern Ireland, all of which originated in the breakup of the UK Green Party. However, all three parties are now fully independent. The Scottish Greens won their first seat in the Scottish Parliament in 1999 and entered government for the first time in 2021 under the Bute House Agreement with the SNP, making then co-leaders Lorna Slater and Patrick Harvie the first green ministers in a UK government. At the 2026 Scottish Parliament Election, the party won its highest-ever number of seats, returning 15 MSPs, and won its first constituency MSPs. However, it has never won representation in the House of Commons. The party is currently led by co-leaders Ross Greer and Gillian McKay.

The Scottish Conservatives are the Scottish wing of the UK-wide Conservative Party. They were founded in 1965 out of the merger of the Scottish Unionist Party, which had been a dominant political force in Scotland for much of the early 20th century, winning the majority of votes and seats in the 1931 general election and 1955 general election. However the party went into decline, being reduced from 21 Scottish seats in 1983, to 10 in 1987. The 1997 general election was a catastrophe for the Scottish Conservatives, who were left with no Scottish seats whatsoever. However the party won 18 seats in the Scottish Parliament in the 1999 election due to proportional representation. From 2001 to 2017, the Conservatives held one Scottish seat in the UK parliament, but had its best result in the 21st century in the 2017 general election when it returned 13 seats and just short of a third of the vote. Like the wider UK Conservative Party, the party is a centre-right to right-wing party, which promotes conservatism and British unionism. The party currently has 12 MSPs, its lowest-ever share of seats in the Scottish Parliament, where it is led by Russell Findlay, and 5 MPs.

The Scottish Liberal Democrats is the Scottish State Party with the federal structure of the Great Britain-wide Liberal Democrats party. It is a social liberal party and supports a federal structure for the United Kingdom, sitting between the centre and centre-left of the left-right spectrum. The Liberal Democrats were formed in 1988 when the Liberal Party and the Social Democratic Party merged. The leader of the Scottish Liberal Democrats is Alex Cole-Hamilton. The formation of the Conservative–Liberal Democrat coalition at Westminster in 2010 caused support for the Liberal Democrats to fall sharply. The 2024 Westminster general election saw recovery in Scotland to the background of a UK wide recovery for the party and a sharp fall in SNP support. The Scottish Liberal Democrats gained two Westminster seats from the SNP in 2024. This recovery continued at the 2026 Scottish Parliament election, where it won 10 MSPs, its best result since 2007.

== Parties with elected representation ==
=== Scottish Parliament and/or House of Commons ===
There are six parties in Scotland that have elected representation in either the Scottish Parliament or the House of Commons. All except the Scottish Greens and Reform UK have representation in both. In addition, all parties have elected representation at the local government level.

Party	Founded	Political position	Ideology	Leader(s)	Scottish Parliament	House of Commons	Local government	Membership (Note: Political parties are under no legal obligation to publish membership statistics and there is no uniformly recognised definition of membership.)
Scottish National Party	1934	Centre-left	Scottish nationalism; Scottish independence; Social democracy; Regionalism; Civic nationalism; Pro-Europeanism	John Swinney	57 / 129	8 / 57	411 / 1,226	50,400
Scottish Labour (Note: Some candidates stand as Labour and Co-operative joint candidates due to an electoral alliance with the Co-operative Party.)	1994	Centre-left	Social democracy; Scottish unionism; British devolution	Michael Marra	17 / 129	36 / 57	259 / 1,226	11,000
Reform UK	2018	Right-wing to far-right	Right-wing populism; Hard Euroscepticism	Malcolm Offord	17 / 129	0 / 57	24 / 1,226	12,500
Scottish Greens	1990	Centre-left to left-wing	Green politics; Scottish independence; Scottish republicanism; Pro-Europeanism	Ross Greer and Gillian Mackay (co-leadership)	15 / 129	0 / 57	32 / 1,226	10,000
Scottish Conservatives	1965	Centre-right to right-wing	Conservatism; Scottish unionism; Economic liberalism	Russell Findlay	12 / 129	6 / 57	167 / 1,226	6,941
Scottish Liberal Democrats	1988	Centre to centre-left	Liberalism; Social liberalism; British federalism; Scottish unionism; Pro-Europeanism	Alex Cole-Hamilton	10 / 129	6 / 57	87 / 1,226	4,185

=== Local government ===
There are five parties in Scotland that have elected representation only at the local government level.

Party	Founded	Ideology	Council area(s)	Councillors
Your Party	2025	Socialism	Glasgow	3
British Unionist Party	2015	British unionism, Scottish unionism, Social conservatism, Social democracy, British nationalism	North Lanarkshire	1
Rubbish Party	2017	Localism, Environmentalism	East Ayrshire	1
West Dunbartonshire Community Party	2016	Socialism	West Dunbartonshire	1

== Parties with no elected representation ==
=== Notable registered parties ===
There are a number of notable registered parties in Scotland with no elected representation. Some operate exclusively within Scotland, while others may also be active in other parts of the United Kingdom.

Party	Founded	Ideology	Leader
Abolish the Scottish Parliament Party	2020	Scottish Parliament abolition, Anti-devolution, Scottish unionism	John Mortimer
Alliance to Liberate Scotland	2026	Scottish independence	Hazel Lyon
Animal Welfare Party	2006	Animal welfare	Vanessa Hudson
British National Party	1982	British fascism, White nationalism, Right-wing populism, Ethnic nationalism, Ultranationalism, Hard Euroscepticism	Adam Walker
Christian Party	2004	Christian right, Social conservatism, British unionism, Euroscepticism	Donald Boyd
Christian Peoples Alliance	1999	Christian democracy, Social conservatism, Euroscepticism	Sidney Cordle
Communist Party of Britain	1988	Communism, Marxism–Leninism	Robert Griffiths
Independence for Scotland Party	2020	Scottish independence	Colette Walker
Independent Green Voice	2003	Ultranationalism, Scottish unionism, British unionism, Euroscepticism	Alistair McConnachie
Liberal Party	1989	British liberalism, Georgism, Euroscepticism	Steve Radford
National Front	1967	British fascism, Neo-fascism, British nationalism, White supremacy	Tony Martin
Official Monster Raving Loony Party	1983	Political satire	Alan Hope
Reclaim Party	2020	Right-wing populism, Anti-lockdown	Laurence Fox
Scottish Family Party	2017	Christian right, Social conservatism, Anti-abortion, Anti-LGBT	Richard Lucas
Scottish Libertarian Party	2012	Libertarianism, Classical liberalism, Minarchism, Euroscepticism, Cultural liberalism, Scottish independence	Tam Laird
Scottish Socialist Party	1998	Democratic socialism, Scottish independence, Scottish republicanism	Colin Fox and Natalie Reid (Note: Styled by the party as co-spokespersons.)
Scottish Unionist Party	1986	Scottish unionism, British unionism, Anti-Scottish Parliament	Jonathan Stanley
Social Democratic Party	1990	Social democracy, Social conservatism, Communitarianism, Euroscepticism	William Clouston
Socialist Labour Party	1996	Socialism, Fiscal localism, Republicanism, Hard Euroscepticism	Arthur Scargill
Sovereignty	2020	Scottish independence, Hard Euroscepticism	Brian Nugent
Trade Unionist and Socialist Coalition	2010	Socialism, Trade unionism	Dave Nellist
UK Independence Party	1993	Euroscepticism, Right-wing populism, National conservatism, Economic liberalism, British nationalism	Donald Mackay
Volt UK	2020	Social liberalism, Progressivism, Pro-Europeanism	Alex Haida
Workers Party of Britain	2019	Socialism, Social conservatism, Euroscepticism, British unionism	George Galloway

== Historical and deregistered parties ==
=== Notable historical parties ===
- Communist Bulletin Group
- Communist Labour Party
- Communist Party of Great Britain
- Communist Party of Scotland
- Crofters Party
- Fife Socialist League
- Highland Land League (1882)
- Highland Land League (1909)
- Independent Labour Party
- Kirk Party
- Labour Party of Scotland
- Left Alliance
- Liberal Unionist Party
- Moderates
- National Labour Organisation
- National Liberal Party (1922)
- National Liberal Party (1931)
- National Party of Scotland
- New Party
- Orkney and Shetland Movement
- Progressives
- Protestant Action Society
- Referendum Party
- Scottish Democratic Fascist Party
- Scottish Labour Party (1888)
- Scottish Labour Party (1976)
- Scottish Land Restoration League
- Scottish Liberal Party
- Scottish Militant Labour
- Scottish Party
- Scottish Prohibition Party
- Scottish Protestant League
- Scottish Republican Socialist Party
- Scottish Socialist Federation
- Scottish Socialist Party (1932)
- Scottish United Trades Councils Labour Party
- Scottish Voice
- Scottish Workers' Representation Committee
- Scottish Workers Republican Party
- Shetland Movement
- Social Democratic Party (1979)
- Social Democratic Party (1981)
- Social Democratic Party (1988)
- Socialist Labour Party (1903)
- Squadrone Volante
- Unionist Party
- United Socialist Movement
- Whigs
- Women's Equality Party
- Workers Party of Scotland

=== Notable deregistered parties ===
- Action for Independence
- Alba Party
- All for Unity
- Borders Party
- Britain First
- Britannica Party
- Cannabis Is Safer Than Alcohol
- Change UK
- Countryside Party
- East Dunbartonshire Independent Alliance
- East Kilbride Alliance
- Fishing Party
- Glasgow First
- Highlands and Islands Alliance
- Legalise Cannabis Alliance
- Natural Law Party
- No2EU
- Orkney Manifesto Group
- Pirate Party UK
- ProLife Alliance
- Renew Party
- RISE
- Rock 'n' Roll Loony Party
- Scottish Democratic Alliance
- Scottish Jacobite Party
- Scottish Senior Citizens Unity Party
- Scottish Voice
- Solidarity
- Trust

== See also ==
- Student wings of political parties in Scotland
- Politics of Scotland
- Elections in Scotland
