= West Kilbride (ward) =

Former electoral ward in North Ayrshire

- North Ayrshire
- Electorate: 3,838 (2003)
- Major settlements: West Kilbride
- Scottish Parliament constituency: Cunninghame North
- Scottish Parliament region: West Scotland
- UK Parliament constituency: North Ayrshire and Arran

1999–2007
- Number of councillors: 1
- Replaced by: Dalry and West Kilbride
- Created from: West Kilbride and Fairlie

West Kilbride was one of the 30 wards used to elect members of North Ayrshire Council. Created in 1999 following the Third Statutory Reviews of Electoral Arrangements, the ward elected one councillor using the first past the post electoral system. the ward was abolished in 2007 following the Fourth Statutory Reviews of Electoral Arrangements.

The ward latterly produced strong results for the Independent candidate Elizabeth McLardy but was previously held by the Scottish Conservative and Unionist Party.

== Councillors ==
Year	Councillor
1974	Alexander Jack (Independent/Moderate)
1977	Alexander Jack (Independent/Moderate)
1980	Phil Gallie (Conservative)
1984	Edith Clarkson (Conservative)
1988	Edith Clarkson (Conservative)
1992	Edith Clarkson (Conservative)
1995	Ward replaced by West Kilbride & Fairlie
1999	Elizabeth McLardy (Independent)
2003	Elizabeth McLardy (Independent)

== Election results ==
=== 2003 Election ===
West Kilbride
Party	Candidate	Votes	%	±%
Independent	Elizabeth McLardy	1,232	52.5	▲10.7
Conservative	Anne Wilkinson	654	27.9	▼4.8
Labour	Michael McGuire	220	9.4	New
SNP	John Willis	171	7.3	New
Socialist Labour	James McDaid	59	2.5	New
Majority		578	24.6	▲15.5
Turnout		2,346	61.1	▼8.2
Registered electors		3,838		
Independent hold		Swing	▲10.7	

=== 1999 election ===
West Kilbride
Party	Candidate	Votes	%	±%
Independent	Elizabeth McLardy	1,079	41.8	▲5.5
Conservative	Anne Wilkinson	844	32.7	New
Labour	Andrew Naismith	352	13.7	New
SNP	Peter Falconer	301	11.6	New
Majority		235	9.1	▲5.5
Turnout		2,576	69.3	▲11.9
Registered electors		3,726		
Independent hold		Swing	▲5.5	

=== 1992 election ===
West Kilbride
Party	Candidate	Votes	%	±%
Conservative	Edith Clarkson	1,350	65.9	▼6
Labour	S McCann	380	18.5	▼3.7
SNP	J. Kerr	314	15.3	New
Majority		970	47.4	
Turnout		1,020	50.0	▼7.9
Registered electors		4,102		
Conservative hold		Swing		
