= North Ayrshire Council elections =

Local government elections in North Ayrshire, Scotland

North Ayrshire Council in Scotland holds elections every five years, previously holding them every four years from its creation as a single-tier authority in 1995 to 2007.

== Council elections ==
Year	SNP	Conservative	Labour	Liberal Democrats	Independent
1995	1	1	26	0	1
1999 (Note: New ward boundaries.)	2	2	25	0	1
2003	3	4	21	0	2
2007 (Note: Change to single transferable vote system and new ward boundaries.)	8	3	12	2	5
2012	12	1	11	0	6
2017 (Note: New ward boundaries.)	11	7	11	0	4
2022	12	10	9	0	2

== Results maps ==
1995 results map

1999 results map

2003 results map

== By-elections ==
=== 2003-2007 ===
Ardrossan North By-Election 29 July 2004
Party	Candidate	Votes	%	±%
Conservative	Gordon Allison	340	30.5	+15.6
SNP		316	28.3	−11.5
Labour		259	23.2	−22.2
Independent		99	8.9	+8.9
Scottish Socialist		78	7.0	+7.0
BNP		23	2.1	+2.1
Majority		24	2.2	
Turnout		1,115		
Conservative gain from Labour		Swing		

=== 2007-2012 ===
Kilbirnie and Beith By-Election 11 December 2008
Party	Candidate	FPv%	Count		
Party	Candidate	FPv%	1	2	3
SNP	Anthea Dickson	48.9	1,363	1,380	1,415
Labour	Gordon McKay	33.7	939	956	972
Conservative	Ted Nevill	11.6	322	324	342
Liberal Democrats	Lewis Hutton	3.4	94	104	
Socialist Labour	James McDaid	2.4	68		
SNP hold					
Valid: 2,786 Spoilt: 20 Quota: 1,394 Turnout: 2,806

Saltcoats and Stevenston By-Election 25 August 2011
Party	Candidate	FPv%	Count				
Party	Candidate	FPv%	1	2	3	4	5
Labour	Jim Montgomerie	48.7	1,914	1,927	1,936	1,963	2,039
SNP	Nan Wallace	33.2	1,306	1,311	1,326	1,363	1,425
Conservative	Chris Barr	7.2	284	286	297	308	331
Scottish Senior Citizens	Jimmy Miller	5.4	211	217	222	240	
Independent	Gerard Pollock	2.9	114	117	123		
Liberal Democrats	Gordon Bain	1.4	56	57			
Socialist Labour	Louise McDaid	1.1	43				
Labour hold							
Valid: 2,764 Spoilt: 42 Quota: 1,965 Turnout: 2,806

=== 2012-2017 ===
North Coast and Cumbraes By-Election 30 October 2014
Party	Candidate	FPv%	Count				
Party	Candidate	FPv%	1	2	3	4	5
SNP	Grace McLean	38.7	2,021	2,045	2,156	2,279	2,966
Independent	Drew Cochrane	22.8	1,190	1,234	1,411	2,000	
Conservative	Toni Dawson	21.5	1,125	1,174	1,296		
Labour	Valerie Reid	13.2	691	711			
UKIP	Meilan Henderson	3.6	192				
SNP hold							
Valid: 5,219 Spoilt: 45 Quota: 2,610 Turnout: 5,264

Irvine West By-Election 11 August 2016
Party	Candidate	FPv%	Count					
Party	Candidate	FPv%	1	2	3	4	5	6
Labour	Louise McPhater	33.1	1,029	1,046	1,060	1,118	1,301	1,697
SNP	Robin Sturgeon	37.5	1,164	1,168	1,207	1,226	1,277	
Conservative	Angela Stephen	20.6	639	650	655	658		
Socialist Labour	Bobby Cochrane	4.2	131	133	146			
Green	Josh McCormick	3.0	94	100				
Liberal Democrats	Nick Smith	1.5	48					
Labour gain from SNP								
Valid: 3,105 Spoilt: 46 Quota: 1,553 Turnout: 3,151

=== 2017-2022 ===
Dalry and West Kilbride By-Election 12 August 2021
Party	Candidate	FPv%	Count
Party	Candidate	FPv%	1
Conservative	Ronnie Stalker	53.5	2,016
SNP	Robyn Graham	34.3	1,292
Labour	Valerie Reid	8.1	305
Liberal Democrats	Ruby Kirkwood	1.5	58
Socialist Labour	James McDaid	1.5	57
Independent	John Willis	1.1	42
Conservative gain from SNP			
Valid: 3,770 Spoilt: 31 Quota: 1,886 Turnout: 3,801

=== 2022-2027 ===
Kilwinning By-Election 9 May 2024
Party	Candidate	FPv%	Count
Party	Candidate	FPv%	1
Labour	Mary Hume	53.8	2,171
SNP	Sheila Gibson	22.7	916
Conservative	Chris Lawler	15.3	619
Liberal Democrats	Ruby Kirkwood	3.8	154
Scottish Family	Ian Gibson	3.3	136
Labour gain from Conservative			
Valid: 3,996 Spoilt: 42 Quota: 1,999 Turnout: 4,038

Arran By-Election 12 September 2024
Party	Candidate	FPv%	Count				
Party	Candidate	FPv%	1	2	3	4	5
Labour	Charles Currie	45.4	748	751	754	778	910
Independent	James Andrew McMaster	24.4	402	405	416	442	543
Green	Neil Alexander Wilkonson	20.6	340	342	343	354	
Conservative	Mackenzie Smith	5.5	90	92	112		
Reform	Carole Thomson	3.3	55	55			
Liberal Democrats	Matt Taylor	0.7	12				
Labour gain from Conservative							
Valid: 1,647 Spoilt: 21 Quota: 824 Turnout: 1,668
