= 1961 United Kingdom local elections =

Elections in the United Kingdom

The 1961 United Kingdom local elections took place in 1961.

== England ==
- 1961 Altrincham Municipal Borough Council election
- 1961 Hale Urban District Council election
- 1961 Leeds City Council election
- 1961 Sale Municipal Borough Council election
- 1961 Stretford Municipal Borough Council election
- 1961 Liverpool City Council election
- 1961 London County Council election
- 1961 Manchester City Council election
- 1961 Salford City Council election
- 1961 Sheffield City Council election

=== Counties ===
- Bedfordshire
- Berkshire
- Buckinghamshire
- Cambridgeshire
- Cheshire
- Cornwall
- Cumberland
- Derbyshire
- Devon
- Dorset
- Durham
- East Riding
- East Suffolk
- East Sussex
- Essex
- Gloucestershire
- Hampshire
- Herefordshire
- Hertfordshire
- Holland
- Huntingdonshire
- Isle of Ely
- Isle of Wight
- Kent
- Kesteven
- Lancashire
- Leicestershire
- Lindsey
- London
- Middlesex
- Norfolk
- North Riding
- Northamptonshire
- Northumberland
- Nottinghamshire
- Oxfordshire
- Rutland
- Shropshire
- Soke of Peterborough
- Somerset
- Staffordshire
- Surrey
- Warwickshire
- West Riding
- West Suffolk
- West Sussex
- Westmorland
- Wiltshire
- Worcestershire

== Scotland ==
=== Counties ===
- Aberdeenshire
- Angus
- Argyllshire
- Ayrshire
- Banffshire
- Berwickshire
- Buteshire
- Caithness
- Clackmannanshire
- Dumfriesshire
- Dunbartonshire
- East Lothian
- Fife
- Inverness-shire
- Kincardineshire
- Kinross-shire
- Kirkcudbrightshire
- Lanarkshire
- Midlothian
- Moray
- Nairnshire
- Peeblesshire
- Perthshire
- Orkney
- Renfrewshire
- Ross and Cromarty
- Roxburghshire
- Selkirkshire
- Stirlingshire
- Sutherland
- West Lothian
- Wigtownshire
- Zetland

=== Cities ===
- Aberdeen
- Dundee
- Edinburgh
- Glasgow

== Wales ==
- Anglesey
- Brecknockshire
- Carnarvonshire
- Cardiganshire
- Carmarthenshire
- Denbighshire
- Flintshire
- Glamorganshire
- Merionethshire
- Monmouthshire
- Montgomeryshire
- Pembrokeshire
- Radnorshire

== Northern Ireland ==
- Londonderry

== See also ==
- 1961 in the United Kingdom
