= 1936 Edinburgh Corporation election =

1936 Scottish local government election

Map showing election results by ward

An Election to the Edinburgh Corporation was held on 3 November 1936, alongside municipal elections across Scotland. The election took place amidst an increasingly sectarian political climate, with hardline Protestant and anti-Catholic political parties being on the rise in Glasgow and Edinburgh in the 1930s. The Protestant Action Society (PAS); Edinburgh's far-right Protestant grouping which had inspired a sectarian riot the previous year, won 31% of the vote and got 5 new members elected. The PAS had won 24% in the previous years election.

In Glasgow in 1933 a similarly strong showing by that city's insurgent Protestant party had split the Moderate vote, allowing in a Labour council for the first time in Glasgow's history. In contrast, despite the PAS's strong showing in Edinburgh, the dominant Progressives enjoyed such an overwhelming majority over Labour that the PAS could hardly dent it. Labour, in turn, were relegated to third place.

Edinburgh Corporation at the time was made up of 71 members, of whom 69 were elected. Following the election the Corporation was composed of 46 Progressives/Moderates, 15 Labour, 8 Protestant Action, and 2 independents.

Turnout was 111,841, or 49.3%.

== Aggregate results ==
Edinburgh Corporation election, 1936
Party	Seats	Gains	Losses	Net gain/loss	Seats %	Votes %	Votes	+/−
Progressives	14	0				39.15	43,788	
Labour	5	1	2	▼1		29.25	32,709	
Protestant Action	5	5	0	▲5		26.64	29,797	
Independent	2	2	0	▲2		4.21	4,704	
Tenants' Association						0.43	479	
Ind. Labour Party						0.20	222	
Revolutionary Socialists						0.10	115	
B.S.I.S.L.P.						0.02	27	

== Ward results ==
Broughton 1 seat Electorate: 10,783
Party	Candidate	Votes	%	±%
Protestant Action	George Ballantine	2601		
Progressives	James Gorman (incumbent)	2238		
Majority		363		
Turnout			44.87	
Protestant Action gain from Progressives		Swing		

Canongate 2 seats Electorate: 10,343
Party	Candidate	Votes	%	±%
Independent	Esta Henry	2793	25.27	
Protestant Action	James Leitch	2503	22.64	
Labour	John Gibson	2150	19.45	
Progressives	Alexander Thomson (incumbent)	1918	17.35	
Labour	Alexander H. Paton	1468	13.28	
Ind. Labour Party	James H. Moore	222	2.01	
Majority				
Turnout		5,527	53.92	
Independent gain from Progressives		Swing		
Protestant Action gain from Labour		Swing		

Dalry 1 seat Electorate: 10,783
Party	Candidate	Votes	%	±%
Labour	Mrs Mary Graham (incumbent)	2817		
Protestant Progressive	James Graham	2522		
Majority		295		
Turnout			50.26	
Labour hold		Swing		

Haymarket 1 seat Electorate: 11,527
Party	Candidate	Votes	%	±%
Progressives	Ian A Johnson Gilbert	3659		
Tenants' Association	Mrs Freds. M. Gembles	479		
Majority		3180		
Turnout			36.88	
Progressives hold		Swing		

South Leith Electorate: 15,996
Party	Candidate	Votes	%	±%
Protestant Action	James C. Trainer	4825		
Progressives	George Mackie	2486		
Labour	William D. Mitchell	1495		
Revolutionary Socialists	Thomas Tait	115		
B.S.I.S.L.P.	Robert Gillespie	27		
Majority		2139		
Turnout			54.05	
Protestant Action gain from Progressives		Swing		
