= 1992 Cunninghame District Council election =

Cunninghame District Council election

- 7 May 1992

All 30 seats to Cunninghame District Council 16 seats needed for a majority
- Registered: 103,784
- Turnout: 39.6% (Note: Excludes uncontested wards.)
	First party	Second party	Third party
	Lab	Con	SNP
Party	Labour	Conservative	SNP
Last election	24 seats, 52.3%	4 seats, 20.0%	0 seats, 18.2%
Seats won	20	6	3
Seat change	▼4	▲1	▲3
Popular vote	16,083	8,817	8,911
Percentage	43.9%	24.1%	24.3%
Swing	▼8.4	▲4.1	▲6.1
- The result of the election
Council Leader before election
Labour
Council Leader after election
Labour

Elections to Cunninghame District Council were held on 7 May 1992, on the same day as the other Scottish local government elections. This was the sixth election to the district council following the local government reforms in 1974.

The election used the 30 wards created by the Initial Statutory Reviews of Electoral Arrangements in 1979. Each ward elected one councillor using first-past-the-post voting.

Despite losing four seats, Labour retained control of the council by taking more than 40% of the popular vote and 20 of the 30 seats. The Conservatives remained the second-largest party after taking six seats while the Scottish National Party won their first representation on the council since 1980 after taking three seats.

This was the final election to the district council which was abolished in 1995 following the implementation of the Local Government etc. (Scotland) Act 1994.

== Background ==
Following the implementation of the Local Government (Scotland) Act 1973, a two-tier system of local government comprising nine regions, 53 districts and three island areas was introduced the following year. The 1984 elections would be the fourth district elections since their establishment.

At the previous election in 1988, Labour retained control of the council. Despite a decrease in vote share, the party took over half the popular vote, winning 24 of the 30 seats – an increase of one from 1984. The Conservatives remained the second-largest party after taking four seats – down by one – while one Moderate and one independent candidate were elected.

== Results ==
1992 Cunninghame District Council election result
Party	Seats	Gains	Losses	Net gain/loss	Seats %	Votes %	Votes	+/−
Labour	20	0	4	▼4	66.7	43.9	16,083	▼8.4
Conservative	6	2	0	▲2	20.0	24.1	8,817	▲4.1
SNP	3	3	0	▲3	10.0	24.3	8,911	▲6.1
Moderates	1	0	0	Steady	3.3	3.0	1,108	▲0.7
Independent	0	0	1	▼1	0.0	2.1	768	▼0.8
Liberal Democrats	0	0	0	Steady	0.0	1.7	616	▼0.9
People Pension Power	0	0	0	Steady	0.0	0.9	341	New
Independent Labour	0	0	0	Steady	0.0	0.1	50	▼1.2
Total	30						36,694	

== Ward results ==
=== Irvine West ===
Irvine West
Party	Candidate	Votes	%	±%
Labour	David O'Neill	495	48.2	▼11.3
SNP	L. Brown	348	33.9	▲7.1
Independent	E. Holmes	177	17.2	New
Majority		147	14.3	▼18.4
Turnout		1,020	35.8	▼11.7
Registered electors		2,872		
Labour hold		Swing	▼9.2	

=== Irvine Townhead ===
Irvine Townhead
Party	Candidate	Votes	%	±%
Moderates	Alexander Rubie	794	55.8	▼11.9
Labour	Irene Oldfather	494	34.7	New
Conservative	E. Gibson	133	9.3	New
Majority		300		
Turnout			45.1	▼7.3
Registered electors		3,159		
Moderates hold		Swing		

=== Saltcoats East ===
Saltcoats East
Party	Candidate	Votes	%	±%
Labour	David Munn	768	63.4	
SNP	Ms J. McGoogan	421	34.8	
Majority		347		
Turnout			38.1	
Registered electors		3,177		
Labour hold		Swing		

=== West Kilbride ===
West Kilbride
Party	Candidate	Votes	%	±%
Conservative	Edith Clarkson	1,350	65.9	▼6
Labour	S McCann	380	18.5	▼3.7
SNP	J. Kerr	314	15.3	New
Majority		970	47.4	
Turnout		1,020	50.0	▼7.9
Registered electors		4,102		
Conservative hold		Swing		

=== Arran ===
Arran
Party	Candidate	Votes	%	±%
Conservative	Thomas Knox	799	43.5	New
Labour	John Sillars	731	39.8	▲7.4
SNP	M. Lunan	304	16.6	New
Majority		68	3.7	N/A
Turnout		1,834	51.2	▼0.3
Registered electors		3,586		
Conservative gain from Independent		Swing	▲43.5	

== Aftermath ==
Despite losing four seats, Labour retained control of the council by winning two-thirds of the seats. The Conservatives remained the second-largest party after taking six seats – an increase of two. After failing to win a seat for two consecutive elections, the Scottish National Party (SNP) won their first representation on the council since 1980.

Two years after the election, local government reforms were brought in through the Local Government etc. (Scotland) Act 1994. The two-tier system of districts, regions and island areas would be replaced by a system of 32 unitary authorities with the first elections taking place in 1995. As a result, this was the final election to the district council which was abolished in 1995 and replaced by North Ayrshire Council following the implementation of the Local Government etc. (Scotland) Act 1994. The regional council, Strathclyde was also abolished and the new unitary authority took on its responsibilities.
