= Scottish Students =

Scottish Students may refer to:

- Coalition of Higher Education Students in Scotland
- Federation of Student Nationalists
- National Union of Students Scotland
- Scottish Conservative and Unionist Students
- Scottish Labour Students
- A former rugby union team that competed in the 1994 Women's Rugby World Cup

== See also ==
- Student wings of political parties in Scotland
