= 1949 Stirlingshire County Council election =

Elections to Stirlingshire County Council were held on 10 May 1949, the same day as the other county councils in Scotland. The election saw Labour lose its majority, with no party gaining an overall majority.

== Aggregate results ==
Stirlingshire County Council election, 1949 Contested Seats
Party	Seats	Gains	Losses	Net gain/loss	Seats %	Votes %	Votes	+/−
Labour	21			▼4				
Moderates	20			▲3				
Independent	1			▲1				
Communist	0							
Ind. Labour Party	0							
