= Fishing Party =

Fishing Party may refer to:

- Fishing Party (Australia), a minor political party founded 2000
- Fishing Party (Scotland), a single-issue political party founded 2003

== See also ==
- Recreational fishing
