= 1949 Fife County Council election =

1949 Scottish local government election

Elections to Fife County Council were held on 10 May 1949, the same day as the other county councils in Scotland. The election saw Labour win 18 of the 25 contested seats, with 5 going to the Moderates, and 2 to the Communists.

Despite these gains Labour were unable to form a majority on the council, and the Moderates (despite winning only half of the landward seats) were able to form a majority in the council due to the majorities in the town councils for Leven and Inverkeithing, both of which sent representatives to the county council.

== Aggregate results ==
Fife County Council election, 1949
Party	Seats	Gains	Losses	Net gain/loss	Seats %	Votes %	Votes	+/−
Moderates	23	1						
Labour	21		1					
Communist	2		3	▼3				
SNP	0			Steady			202	
