= 1988 Cunninghame District Council election =

Cunninghame District Council election

- 5 May 1988

All 30 seats to Cunninghame District Council 16 seats needed for a majority
- Registered: 104,467
- Turnout: 49.3% (Note: Excludes uncontested wards.)
	First party	Second party
	Lab	Con
Party	Labour	Conservative
Last election	23 seats, 56.4%	5 seats, 21.9%
Seats won	24	4
Seat change	▲1	▼1
Popular vote	25,882	9,880
Percentage	52.3%	20.0%
Swing	▼4.1	▼1.9
Council Leader before election
Labour
Council Leader after election
Labour

Elections to Cunninghame District Council were held on 5 May 1988, on the same day as the other Scottish local government elections. This was the fifth election to the district council following the local government reforms in 1974.

The election used the 30 wards created by the Initial Statutory Reviews of Electoral Arrangements in 1979. Each ward elected one councillor using first-past-the-post voting.

Despite a drop in their vote share, Labour retained control of the council after and again took more than half the popular vote as they won 24 of the 30 seats – an increase of one from 1984. The Conservatives remained as the second largest party with four seats – a decrease of one.

== Background ==
Following the implementation of the Local Government (Scotland) Act 1973, a two-tier system of local government comprising nine regions, 53 districts and three island areas was introduced the following year. The 1984 elections would be the fourth district elections since their establishment.

At the previous election in 1984, Labour retained control of the council. The party took over half the popular vote as it increased its vote share by 10 percentage points, winning 23 of the 30 seats – and increase of two from 1980. The Conservatives retained all five of their seats to remain as the second largest party while one Moderate and one independent candidate were elected. The Scottish National Party (SNP) lost all their representation on the council.

In 1981, an electoral alliance was formed between the Liberal Party and the Social Democratic Party. This lasted until the parties merged in March 1988 to form the Scottish Social and Liberal Democrats (SSLD), later renamed the Liberal Democrats, who contested the 1988 district elections.

== Results ==
1988 Cunninghame District Council election result
Party	Seats	Gains	Losses	Net gain/loss	Seats %	Votes %	Votes	+/−
Labour	24	1	0	▲1	80.0	52.3	25,882	▼4.1
Conservative	4	0	1	▼1	13.3	20.0	9,880	▼1.9
Independent	1	0	0	Steady	3.3	2.9	1,433	▼1.2
Moderates	1	0	0	Steady	3.3	2.3	1,144	▲0.2
SNP	0	0	0	Steady	0.0	18.2	9,032	▲6.9
SSLD	0	0	0	Steady	0.0	2.6	1,284	New
Independent Labour	0	0	0	Steady	0.0	1.3	644	▲0.8
Pensioner Power	0	0	0	Steady	0.0	0.4	207	New
Total	30						49,506	

== Ward results ==
=== Irvine West ===
Irvine West
Party	Candidate	Votes	%	±%
Labour	D. O'Neill	852	59.5	▲2.4
SNP	L. Brown	383	26.8	▲0.3
Independent Labour	C. McDowall	95	6.6	New
SSLD	J. McDill	91	6.4	New
Majority		469	32.7	▲12.1
Turnout		1,421	47.5	▼6.2
Registered electors		3,011		
Labour hold		Swing	▲2.4	

=== Arran ===
Arran
Party	Candidate	Votes	%	±%
Independent	E. Sillars	1,148	66.2	▼7.9
Labour	J. Sillars	562	32.4	▲7.9
Majority		586	33.8	▼15.8
Turnout		1,710	51.5	▲6.6
Registered electors		3,366		
Independent hold		Swing	▼7.9	

== Aftermath ==
Labour retained control of the council after winning 24 of the 30 seats. Despite a drop in vote share of four percentage points, the party again took more than half of the popular vote and increased their number on the council by one from the previous election. The Conservatives lost one seat but remained as the second-largest party with four councillors. The SNP came third on the popular vote and came within 1,000 votes of the Conservatives but were unable to regain any seats. One Moderate and one independent candidate were also elected.
