= 1936 Glasgow Corporation election =

Election held in Glasgow, Scotland

Map showing results in Glasgow Corporation wards. Green wards held no election.

An Election to the Glasgow Corporation was held on 3 November 1936, alongside municipal elections across Scotland.

Glasgow Corporation at the time was made up of 116 members, of whom 114 were elected. Following the election the Corporation was composed of 47 Progressives/Moderates (49 including the ex officio members, who sat as Progressives), 55 Socialists, and 12 ILP councilors.

Turnout was 248,053, or 51.99%.

== Aggregate results ==
Glasgow Corporation election, 1936
Party	Seats	Gains	Losses	Net gain/loss	Seats %	Votes %	Votes	+/−
Progressives	15	8	1	+7		47.80	118,567	
Labour	14	1	3	-2		37.77	93,696	
Ind. Labour Party	2	-	1	-1		9.44	23,421	
Independent Progressive	1	-	-	-		0.71	1,770	
SPL	-	-	4	-4	-	3.39	8,403	
Independent	-	-	-	-	-	0.55	1,365	
Communist	-	-	-	-	-	0.34	829	
