= Robert Dundas, 9th Viscount Melville =

British Army captain

- Born: 28 May 1937; Melville Castle, Dalkeith
- Died: 21 July 2011 (aged 74); Wiltshire
- Military career
- Allegiance: United Kingdom
- Branch: British Army
- Rank: Captain

Robert Dundas, 9th Viscount Melville (28 May 1937 – 21 July 2011) was a British Army officer and peer.

The eldest son of Robert Maldred St John Melville Dundas, the younger brother of the 8th Viscount Melville, and his wife Margaret, Dundas became the heir to the viscountcy when his father died in 1940. After his mother remarried, Dundas was raised at Keltie Castle in Perthshire.

Dundas attended Cargilfield Preparatory School and Wellington College in Berkshire before receiving officer training at Eaton Hall. Dundas joined the Army as a lieutenant in the Scots Guards in 1956, serving first in West Germany and then in Caterham, eventually rising to the rank of captain. After performing his national service Dundas remained a reserve Captain in the Scots Guards and served in the Ayrshire Yeomanry.

Dundas won election to the Melville Division of the Midlothian County Council in 1961 and to the Midlothian District Council after the passage of the Local Government (Scotland) Act in 1973. He later worked in the City of London, and upon succeeding his uncle in 1971 as Viscount Melville was a regular attendee of the House of Lords. In 1982 Melville married Fiona Stilgoe, with whom he had two sons. Though he lived in Gloucestershire and Wiltshire in his later years, he maintained his interest in Scottish affairs.

He was succeeded as Viscount Melville by his son Robert.

== Arms ==
Coat of arms of Robert Dundas, 9th Viscount Melville
Crest A lion's head affronteé Gules struggling through an oak bush all Proper. Escutcheon Argent a lion rampant Gules within a bordure Azure charged with three boars' heads couped Or two in chief and one in base. Supporters Dexter a leopard reguardant, sinister a stag, both Proper. Motto Essayez (top); Quod Potui Perfecti (bottom)

Peerage of the United Kingdom
Preceded by Henry Dundas	Viscount Melville; 1971–2011	Succeeded by Robert Dundas
