= 1933 Glasgow Corporation election =

Local election in Scotland

- 7 November 1933
	First party	Second party	Third party
Leader		George Smith	Patrick Dollan
Party	Moderates	Labour	Ind. Labour Party
Seats won	50	47	11
Seat change	▼	▲
	Fourth party	Fifth party
Leader	Alexander Ratcliffe
Party	SPL	Independent
Seats won	7	1
Seat change	▲4
- Map showing results in Glasgow Corporation wards
Council Leader before election
Moderates
Council Leader after election
George Smith
Labour

The 1933 Glasgow Corporation elections were held on 7 November 1933. The results were devastating for the Moderates, who lost control of the Corporation to Labour for the first time, despite socialist candidates making gains in Glasgow at successive general elections. Labour’s victory came as a surprise, even to the party itself, which had already begun blaming its anticipated defeat on vote-splitting caused by the presence of the ILP & the Communists. Labour's dominance of the Corporation would continue, nearly unbroken, to the present day.

Despite winning a combined share of 52.5% of the vote, compared to the Labour/ILP share of 42.8%, the FPTP nature of the ward voting system meant that the split in the Moderate vote allowed Labour to make strong gains at the Moderates expense. Radcliffe acknowledged and welcomed the role he had played in causing the downfall of the Moderate led Corporation, claiming that "if the Socialists have a majority in Glasgow Town Council, they have the Scottish Protestant League to thank for it."

A split between Labour and the Independent Labour Party had ensued a year prior, although Patrick Dollan; a Glaswegian socialist of Irish descent, was able to keep the bulk of the Glasgwegian-based ILP on-side. Despite strong support for Labour amongst Glaswegians of Catholic-Irish origin, only 6 out of Glasgow's 116 Councillors following the election were Catholic.

The Moderates were not to bounce back in the following years election either however, and the combined Moderates/SPL share of the vote fell to 46.4%, whilst the Labour/ILP share rose to 51%. Even after several years, when the SPL had faded from the political picture, the Moderate vote did not rebound to its pre-split height, with many SPL voters in turn moving to Labour.

The election was not only a disappointment for Glasgow's right wing parties, but also for its far-left. The Communist party had fielded 15 candidates; who in fact performed moderately well in several working class wards, notably Cowlairs, Springburn, and Gorbals. Despite this however the party failed to gain a single seat, and ultimately won only 10,484 votes; or 3.4% of the total 311,000 votes cast.

== Election result ==
Glasgow Corporation election, 1933 Total votes: 310,898
Party	Seats	Gains	Losses	Net gain/loss	Seats %	Votes %	Votes	+/−
Labour		12	1	▲11		31.55	98,086	
Moderates	6	0	17	▼17		24.25	75,385	
SPL	4	4	0	▲4		23.00	71,512	
Ind. Labour Party	3	2	0	▲2		11.28	35,083	
Independent Moderate	1			Steady		5.27	16,406	
Communist	0	0	0	Steady		3.37	10,484	
Independent	0					1.27	3,940	

== Ward results ==
=== Anderston ===
Anderston (1) Electorate: 12,616
Party	Candidate	Votes	%	±%
Moderates	Hugh Barrie	2,715	36.56	
Ind. Labour Party	Daniel McMillan	2,408	32.43	
Independent	Edward Kennedy	2,303	31.01	
Majority		307	4.13	
Turnout		7,426	58.86	
Moderates hold		Swing		

=== Camphill ===
Camphill (1) Electorate: 13,073
Party	Candidate	Votes	%	±%
SPL	Francis McGee	4,132	61.87	
Moderates	James McLuskie*	2,546	38.13	
Majority		1,586	23.74	N/A
Turnout		6,678	51.08	
SPL gain from Moderates		Swing		

=== Calton ===
Calton (1) Electorate: 13,071
Party	Candidate	Votes	%	±%
Labour	William D. Hunter*	4,115		
Moderates	Hugh Campbell	1826		
Communist	Joseph D. McMillan	737		
Majority		2289		
Turnout				
Labour hold		Swing		

=== Cathcart ===
Cathcart (1) Electorate: 21,014 Spoiled papers: 81
Party	Candidate	Votes	%	±%
SPL	Angelina Selby	6,333	55.71	
Moderates	James Kenneth Weir*	5,035	44.29	
Majority		1,298	11.42	N/A
Turnout		11,368		
SPL gain from Moderates		Swing		

=== Cowcaddens ===
Cowcaddens (1) Electorate: 16,086 Spoiled papers: 40
Party	Candidate	Votes	%	±%
Labour	William T. Doherty*	5,244		
SPL	Hugh Graham	3253		
Communist	Joseph Gerrard	726		
Ind. Moderate	Joseph Gerrard	651		
Majority		1991		
Turnout		9874		
Labour hold		Swing		

=== Cowlairs ===
Cowlairs (1) Electorate: 11,469 Spoiled papers: 17
Party	Candidate	Votes	%	±%
Labour	Alexander H. Porter	2,943		
Moderates	Rev. Robert Daly*	1856		
SPL	Andrew Brown	1759		
Communist	Alexander McLean	900		
Majority		1107		
Turnout				
Labour gain from Moderates		Swing		

=== Dalmarnock ===
Dalmarnock (1) Electorate: 15,599 Spoiled papers: 41
Party	Candidate	Votes	%	±%
Ind. Socialist	Alexander Munro*	3,170		
Ind. Labour Party	Thomas Taylor	2773		
SPL	Jane Pickering	1675		
Independent Protestant	Rev. T. B. Lyons	1165		
Majority		397		
Turnout				
Ind. Socialist hold		Swing		

=== Dennistoun ===
Dennistoun (1) Electorate: 15,778 Spoiled papers: 36
Party	Candidate	Votes	%	±%
SPL	Archibald Jackson	4,627		
Moderates	Alexander Sinclair*	4,062		
Majority		565		
Turnout				
SPL gain from Moderates		Swing		

=== Fairfield ===
Fairfield (1) Electorate: 17,852 Spoiled papers: 44
Party	Candidate	Votes	%	±%
Labour	Thomas A. Kerr*	5,159		
SPL	Cecil Hunter McMichael	3,500		
Ind. Labour Party	Thomas Kinloch	1,464		
Independent Moderate	David Gillanders	866		
Soviet	Thomas Anderson	146		
Majority		1,659		N/A
Turnout				
SPL gain from Moderates		Swing		

=== Gorbals ===
Gorbals (1) Electorate: 19,313
Party	Candidate	Votes	%	±%
Labour	James L. Gillespie*	4,595	57.50	
Communist	Harry McShane	1956	24.48	
Independent Moderate	John M.D. Watson	1440	18.02	
Majority		2642	33.02	
Turnout		7991	41.38	
Labour hold		Swing		

=== Govan ===
Govan (1) Electorate: 15,911
Party	Candidate	Votes	%	±%
Labour	John Storrie*	4,457		
SPL	Robert Hayes	2180		
Ind. Labour Party	Alexander J. Archibald	1894		
Independent Moderate	Robert Roxburgh	1507		
Communist	Peter C. B. McIntyre	810		
Majority		2277		
Turnout		10,848	68.18	
Labour hold		Swing		
