= 1961 Midlothian County Council election =

1961 Scottish local government election

The administrative county of Midlothian (1889–1974), shown within northern Britain.

Elections to Midlothian County Council were held on 10 May 1961. Midlothian was one of the four divisions that made up the historic region of Lothian in Scotland. The Local Government (Scotland) Act 1889 established Midlothian as an administrative county, governed by a County Council.

The county was divided into 39 electoral divisions, each of which returned one member. In 1961 there were contests in 16 of these.

Following the election the council was composed of 30 Labourites, eight Moderates, and one Communist.

== Aggregate results ==
Midlothian County Council election, 1961 Contested Seats
| Party | Seats | Gains | Losses | Net gain/loss | Seats % | Votes % | Votes | +/− |
|---|---|---|---|---|---|---|---|---|
| Labour | 30 | 4 | 1 | ▲3 | 76.92 | 54.84 | 5,038 | |
| Moderates | 8 | 1 | 4 | ▼3 | 20.51 | 36.66 | 3,368 | |
| Communist | 1 | 0 | 0 | Steady | 2.56 | 3.56 | 327 | |
| Independent | 0 | 0 | 0 | Steady | 0.00 | 2.88 | 265 | |
| Independent Labour | 0 | 0 | 0 | Steady | 0.00 | 2.05 | 188 | |

== Results by division ==
Limefield & Parkhead
| Party | Candidate | Votes | % |
|---|---|---|---|
| Labour | W. G. Rankine | 299 | |
| Independent Labour | A. Dickson | 188 | |
| Majority | | 111 | |
| Turnout | | | |
| Labour hold | | | |

Polbeth
| Party | Candidate | Votes | % |
|---|---|---|---|
| Labour | A. Hartley | 343 | |
| Communist | J. McArthur | 327 | |
| Majority | | 16 | |
| Turnout | | | |
| Labour hold | | | |

Newbridge
| Party | Candidate | Votes | % |
|---|---|---|---|
| Labour | Mrs Elizabeth Dickson | 200 | |
| Moderates | H. Gibson | 178 | |
| Majority | | 22.0 | |
| Turnout | | | |
| Labour gain from Moderates | | | |

Currie
| Party | Candidate | Votes | % |
|---|---|---|---|
| Labour | R. Sinclair | 641 | 50.08 |
| Moderates | S. C. Black | 639 | 49.92 |
| Majority | | 2 | 0.16 |
| Turnout | | 1,280 | |
| Labour hold | | | |

Glencorse
| Party | Candidate | Votes | % |
|---|---|---|---|
| Moderates | Sir I. H. Maxwell Inglis | 342 | |
| Labour | J. McCarron | 89 | |
| Majority | | 253 | |
| Turnout | | | |
| Moderates hold | | | |

Kirkhill
| Party | Candidate | Votes | % |
|---|---|---|---|
| Moderates | J. Jardin | 224 | |
| Labour | J. Bolton | 187 | |
| Majority | | 37 | |
| Turnout | | | |
| Moderates hold | | | |

Bilston
| Party | Candidate | Votes | % |
|---|---|---|---|
| Labour | D. Delaney | 289 | |
| Moderates | D. Ferguson | 158 | |
| Majority | | 131 | |
| Turnout | | | |
| Labour gain from Moderates | | | |

Melville
| Party | Candidate | Votes | % |
|---|---|---|---|
| Moderates | R. D. R. Dundas | 352 | 52.1 |
| Labour | A. Walker | 323 | 47.8 |
| Majority | | 29 | 2.3 |
| Turnout | | 675 | |
| Moderates gain from Labour | | | |

Inveresk West
| Party | Candidate | Votes | % |
|---|---|---|---|
| Labour | R. K. Horsburgh | 306 | |
| Moderates | T. Wright | 201 | |
| Majority | | 105 | |
| Turnout | | | |
| Labour hold | | | |

Inveresk East
| Party | Candidate | Votes | % |
|---|---|---|---|
| Labour | T. White | 424 | |
| Independent | P. Smith | 88 | |
| Labour | Gillan (Incumbent) | 69 | |
| Majority | | 336 | |
| Turnout | | | |
| Labour gain from Labour | | | |

Newbattle First
| Party | Candidate | Votes | % |
|---|---|---|---|
| Labour | A. Anderson | 493 | |
| Moderates | S. B. Syme | 170 | |
| Majority | | 323 | |
| Turnout | | | |
| Labour hold | | | |

Newbattle Second
| Party | Candidate | Votes | % |
|---|---|---|---|
| Moderates | A. Aikman | 311 | |
| Labour | J. McGuff | 226 | |
| Independent | J. McFarlane | 52 | |
| Majority | | 85 | |
| Turnout | | | |
| Moderates hold | | | |

Arniston Second
| Party | Candidate | Votes | % |
|---|---|---|---|
| Labour | J. M. Gaynor | 416 | |
| Independent | T. Kerr | 125 | |
| Majority | | 291 | |
| Turnout | | | |
| Labour hold | | | |

Gorebridge
| Party | Candidate | Votes | % |
|---|---|---|---|
| Labour | R. Burnside | 246 | |
| Moderates | J. S. Aytoun | 213 | |
| Majority | | 33 | |
| Turnout | | | |
| Labour hold | | | |

Borthwick & Temple
| Party | Candidate | Votes | % |
|---|---|---|---|
| Labour | Mrs Mary W. Samuel | 292 | |
| Moderates | J. Waugh | 282 | |
| Majority | | 10 | |
| Turnout | | | |
| Labour gain from Moderates | | | |

Crichton & Fala
| Party | Candidate | Votes | % |
|---|---|---|---|
| Moderates | C. H. K. Corsar | 298 | |
| Labour | J. Duncan | 195 | |
| Majority | | 103 | |
| Turnout | | | |
| Moderates hold | | | |

West Calder
| Party | Candidate | Votes | % | ±% |
|---|---|---|---|---|
| Labour | ? | Unopposed | | |
| Labour hold | | | | |
