= William Weir Gilmour =

Scottish politician (1905–1998)

William Weir Gilmour (1905–1998), was a Scottish politician who was associated with five different political parties; the Independent Labour Party, the New Party, the Scottish Democratic Fascist Party, the Labour and Co-operative party and the Liberal Party.

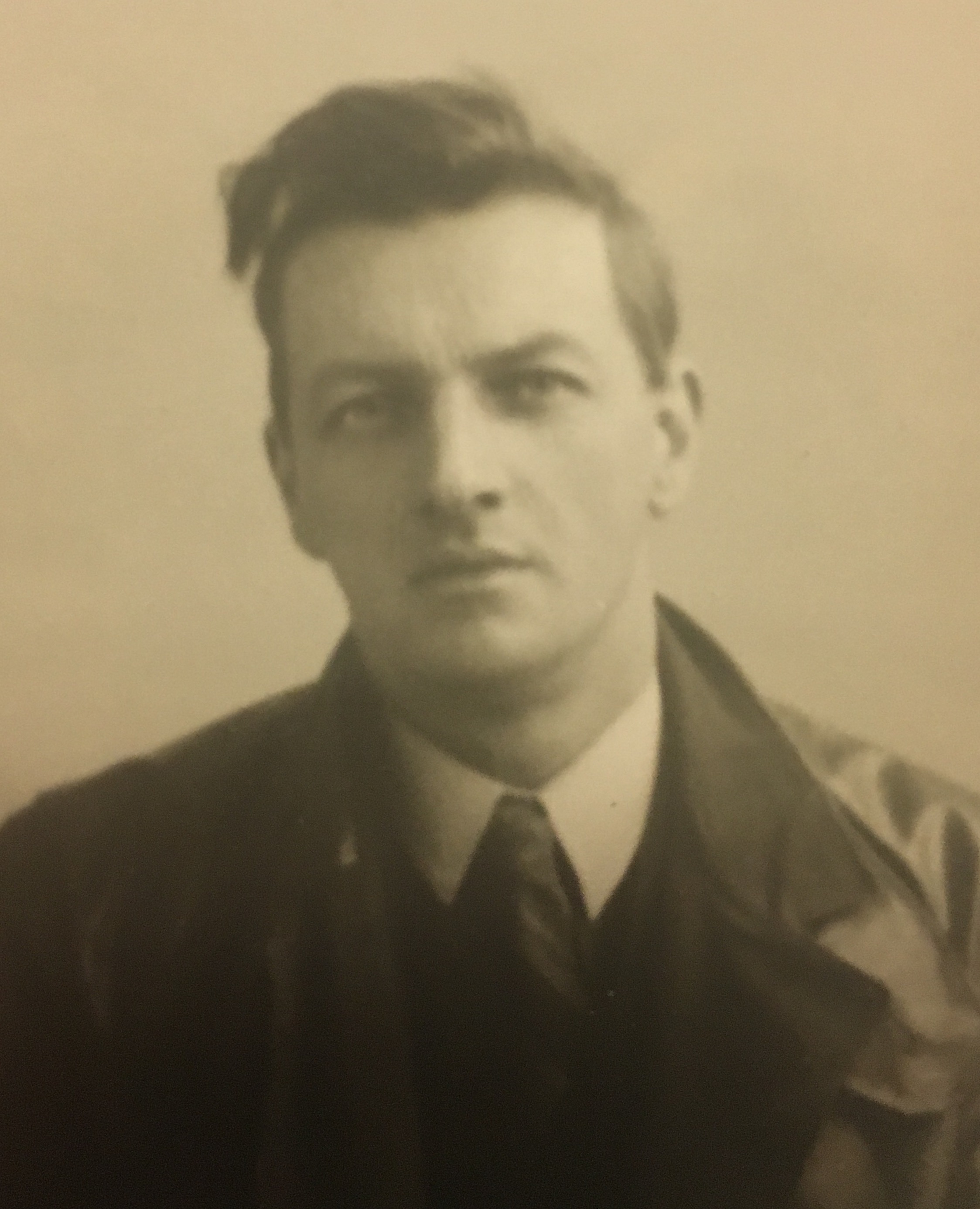
William Weir Gilmour

== Background ==
Weir Gilmour was born in Lanarkshire. He started out working as a miner. He was at one time a mining surveyor, based at Annathill, and in 1920 was elected to the Institution of Mining Engineers. Around 1931 he worked as a salesman.

== Political career ==
=== Independent Labour Party ===
Weir Gilmour started his political activity in his native Lanarkshire as a member of the Independent Labour Party. He was a delegate to the Glasgow Trades and Labour Council.

=== New Party ===
Gilmour's first public candidature came at the 1931 General Election. He had joined the New Party, recently founded by Labour Party rebel Oswald Mosley. He fought the Lanarkshire seat of Coatbridge without success.

General Election 1931: Coatbridge
Party	Candidate	Votes	%	±%
Conservative	William Paterson Templeton	16,223		
Labour	James C. Welsh	14,722		
New Party	William Weir Gilmour	674		n/a
Majority				
Turnout				

=== Scottish Democratic Fascist Party ===
In 1933 Gilmour co-founded the Scottish Democratic Fascist Party (SDFP) with Major Hume Sleigh. The party sought to prohibit Irish migration to Scotland, expel Catholic religious orders from Scotland, and repeal the Education (Scotland) Act 1918 (which allowed Catholic schools into the state system funded through education rates). No Catholics were permitted to join the SDFP.

The SDFP was at odds with Oswald Mosley's larger British Union of Fascists, particularly over the issue of Catholicism. In contrast to the SDFP, the BUF was accepting of Catholics, with Catholics making up a high percentage of the BUF membership, particularly in Northern England. This led to Weir Gilmour denouncing the BUF as "run by Roman Catholics, organised by Roman Catholics, in the interests of Roman Catholics." Gilmour later opined that the SDFP's virulent anti-Catholicism may have unintentionally undermined fascism in Scotland by putting off prospective Catholic recruits.

In 1937 he was elected to Peebles Town Council, for which he remained a member for more than 20 years.

=== Labour Party ===
In the 1945 General Election he was organizer for the Labour and Co-operative Party candidates in Dumfriesshire. He was a frequent speaker on Labour platforms during the election and acted as Election Agent for the Labour candidate at Dumfriesshire.

=== Liberal Party ===
Prior to the 1950 General Election, he gravitated to the Liberal Party. Following boundary changes a new constituency of Midlothian and Peebles was created. He somehow managed to get himself chosen as the Liberal candidate to contest the election. The local liberal associations were still organised on the old boundaries and the Peebles and Southern Midlothian association, which covered much of the new seat, publicly stated that they had never been consulted on the adoption of Gilmour as Liberal candidate. The Chairman of the association and at least one other committee member resigned in protest at his selection. The association secretary said "Councillor Gilmour was not adopted by the Association and we are making no recommendation to Liberals as to how they should vote." In a poor election for the Liberals generally, Gilmour finished third, losing his deposit.

1950 United Kingdom general election: Midlothian and Peebles
Party	Candidate	Votes	%	±%
Labour	David Johnstone Pryde	26,966	52.8	n/a
Unionist	Florence Horsbrugh	19,778	38.7	n/a
Liberal	William Weir Gilmour	4,365	8.54	n/a
Majority		7,188	14.1	n/a
Turnout			82.9	n/a

He did not stand for parliament again.

== Later life ==
Gilmour spent time in a mental hospital during 1956. In 1957, he attracted national publicity when he criticised 'obscene language' on the BBC.

In 1970, Gilmour was sentenced to two years in prison for child sexual abuse.

In 1979 he published a book on Famous Scots.
