= 1961 Edinburgh Corporation election =

Local election in Scotland

- 2 May 1961

23 of the 69 seats to the Edinburgh Corporation 35 seats needed for a majority
	First party	Second party
Party	Progressives	Labour
Last election	39	28
Seats won	12	10
Seats after	38	28
Seat change	▼1	Steady
Popular vote	33,496	27,757
Percentage	43.6%	36.1%
	Third party	Fourth party
Party	Liberal	Protestant Action
Last election	1	1
Seats won	1	0
Seats after	2	1
Seat change	▲1	Steady
Popular vote	15,083	N/A
Percentage	19.6%	N/A
- Results by ward.
Council control before election
Progressives
Council control after election
Progressives

Elections to Edinburgh Corporation were held on 2 May 1961, alongside municipal elections across Scotland. Of the councils 69 seats, 23 were up for election. However, only 16 seats were contested, as councillors were returned unopposed in seven wards.

Only one seat changed hands; Corstorphine ward was gained by the Liberal Party from the Progressive Party.

After the election Edinburgh Corporation was composed of 38 Progressives, 28 Labour councillors, 2 Liberal, and 1 Protestant Action. The Progressives retained overall control of the council.

Turnout in the 14 contested wards was 76,953 or 33.7%.

== Aggregate results ==
Edinburgh Corporation election, 1961
Party	Seats	Gains	Losses	Net gain/loss	Seats %	Votes %	Votes	+/−
Progressives	12	0	1	▼1	58.3	43.6	33,496	
Labour	10	0	0	Steady	39.1	36.1	27,757	
Liberal	1	1	0	▲1	4.3	19.6	15,083	
Communist	0	0	0	Steady	0.0	0.6	496	

== Ward results ==
Location of Broughton ward

Broughton
Party	Candidate	Votes	%
Progressives		Unopposed	
Progressives hold			

Location of Calton ward

Calton
Party	Candidate	Votes	%
Progressives	D. A. P. Buchanan	2,041	
Labour	J. S. Cook	1,929	
Majority		112	
Turnout			33.77
Progressives hold			

Location of Central Leith ward

Central Leith
Party	Candidate	Votes	%
Labour	Barbara Woodburn	2,574	
Progressives	J. Tait	932	
Communist	T. C. Taylor	106	
Majority		1642	
Turnout			27.97
Labour hold			

Location of Colinton ward

Colinton
Party	Candidate	Votes	%
Progressives	Catherine Filsell	Unopposed	
Progressives hold			

Location of Corstorphine ward

Corstorphine
Party	Candidate	Votes	%
Liberal	D. C. Davies	3,406	
Progressives	M. A. Murray	2,493	
Majority		915	
Turnout			38.89
Liberal gain from Progressives			

Location of Craigentinny ward

Craigentinny
Party	Candidate	Votes	%
Labour	Marion R. Alexander	3,112	
Progressives	A. W. Hunt	2,288	
Majority		824	
Turnout			35.84
Labour hold			

Location of Craigmillar ward

Craigmillar
Party	Candidate	Votes	%
Labour	J. Kane	2,025	
Communist	J. A. Young	205	
Majority		1,820	
Turnout			22.54
Labour hold			

Location of George Square ward

George Square
Party	Candidate	Votes	%
Progressives	J. Slack	1,350	
Liberal	V. S. MacKinnon	1,270	
Labour	G. Drummond	731	
Majority		80	
Turnout			29.95
Progressives hold			

Location of Gorgie-Dalry ward

Gorgie-Dalry
Party	Candidate	Votes	%
Labour	D. M. Swanson	2,655	
Progressives	W. E. Bruges	1,591	
Majority		1,064	
Turnout			29.20
Labour hold			

Location of Holyrood ward

Holyrood
Party	Candidate	Votes	%
Labour	P. Rogan	2,194	
Communist	J. Ashton	185	
Labour hold			

Location of Liberton ward

Liberton
Party	Candidate	Votes	%
Labour	P. Wilson	4,180	53.0
Progressives	N. Fairbairn	3,699	46.9
Majority		481	
Turnout		7,879	40.63
Labour hold			

Location of Merchiston ward

Merchiston
Party	Candidate	Votes	%
Progressives	Maurice Heggle	Unopposed	
Progressives hold			

Location of Morningside ward

Morningside
Party	Candidate	Votes	%
Progressives	Elizabeth M. Mein	3,165	
Liberal	Bethia L. Howden	1,718	
Progressives hold			

Location of Murrayfield-Cramond ward

Murrayfield-Cramond
Party	Candidate	Votes	%
Progressives	J. W. McKay	2,808	55.0
Liberal	J. S. Fowlie	2,295	45.0
Majority		513	10.0
Turnout		5,103	34.48
Progressives hold			

Location of Newington ward

Newington
Party	Candidate	Votes	%
Progressives	G. Hodderwick	3,186	
Liberal	W. G. Henderson	2,817	
Labour	Frieda White	1,098	
Majority		369	
Turnout			43.27
Progressives hold			

Location of Pilton ward

Pilton
Party	Candidate	Votes	%
Labour	Magnus Williamson	Unopposed	
Labour hold			

Location of Portobello ward

Portobello
Party	Candidate	Votes	%
Progressives	A. D. Jameson	2,988	
Labour	R. G. Blanche	1,550	
Liberal	J. M. Farquhar	1,534	
Majority		1,438	
Turnout			33.41
Progressives hold			

Location of Sighthill ward

Sighthill
Party	Candidate	Votes	%
Labour	Isabella Stewart	Unopposed	
Labour hold			

Location of South Leith

South Leith
Party	Candidate	Votes	%
Labour	Anne K. Simpson	3,695	
Progressives	E. W. Hall	2,909	
Majority		786	
Turnout			28.84
Labour hold			

Location of St Andrews ward

St. Andrews
Party	Candidate	Votes	%
Progressives	Craig Richards	Unopposed	
Progressives hold			

Location of St Bernards ward

St. Bernard's
Party	Candidate	Votes	%
Progressives	J. Millar	3,005	
Liberal	A. Gordon	2,043	
Majority		962	
Turnout			28.55
Progressives hold			

Location of St Giles ward

St. Giles
Party	Candidate	Votes	%
Labour	J. Henderson	2,014	
Progressives	I. H. McKee	1,041	
Majority		973	
Turnout			23.23
Labour hold			

Location of West Leith ward

West Leith
Party	Candidate	Votes	%
Progressives	Margaret Ross	Unopposed	
Progressives hold			
