= 2003 North Ayrshire Council election =

North Ayrshire Council election

- 1 May 2003

All 30 seats to North Ayrshire Council 16 seats needed for a majority
- Turnout: 48.8%
	First party	Second party	Third party
	Lab	Con	SNP
Party	Labour	Conservative	SNP
Last election	25 seats, 46.9%	2 seats, 18.2%	2 seats, 31.2%
Seats won	21	4	3
Seat change	▼4	▲2	▲1
Popular vote	22,591	9,804	14,465
Percentage	44.0%	19.1%	28.2%
Swing	▼2.9	▲0.9	▼3.0
- Results by ward
Council Leader before election
Labour
Council Leader after election
Labour

Elections to North Ayrshire Council were held on 1 May 2003, the same day as the 31 other local government elections in Scotland and elections to the Scottish Parliament. This was the third election to the council following the implementation of the Local Government etc. (Scotland) Act 1994.

The election used the 30 wards created by the Third Statutory Review of Electoral Arrangements in 1998. Each ward elected one councillor using first-past-the-post voting.

Labour retained control of the council after winning 21 of the 30 seats – down by four from the previous election in 1999. The Conservatives were the second-largest party on the council after doubling their number to four while the Scottish National Party (SNP) won three seats – an increase of one.

== Background ==
Following the implementation of the Local Government etc. (Scotland) Act 1994, a unitary authority system of local government comprising 32 council areas was introduced the following year. The 2003 elections would be the third elections since their establishment.

At the previous election in 1999, Labour retained control after taking 25 of the 30 seats. The Scottish National Party (SNP) and the Conservatives both won two seats and one independent candidate was elected.

== Results ==
2003 North Ayrshire Council election result
Party	Seats	Gains	Losses	Net gain/loss	Seats %	Votes %	Votes	+/−
Labour	21	0	4	▼4	70.0	44.0	22,591	▼2.9
Conservative	4	2	0	▲2	13.3	19.1	9,804	▲0.9
SNP	3	1	0	▲1	10.0	28.2	14,465	▼3.0
Independent	2	1	0	▲1	6.7	5.5	2,837	▲3.6
Scottish Socialist	0	0	0	Steady	0.0	2.4	1,220	▲1.9
Liberal Democrats	0	0	0	Steady	0.0	0.4	199	New
Firefighters Against Cuts	0	0	0	Steady	0.0	0.2	132	New
Socialist Labour	0	0	0	Steady	0.0	0.2	129	▼1.1
Total	30						51,377	

== Ward results ==
=== Irvine West ===
Irvine West
Party	Candidate	Votes	%	±%
Labour	David O'Neill	761	43.9	▲1.1
SNP	C. McKenzie	485	28.0	▼7.7
Conservative	D. Belding	227	13.1	▲0.5
Scottish Socialist	J. Gray	191	11.0	▲6.1
Socialist Labour	R. Cochrane	70	4.0	Steady
Majority		276	15.9	▲8.8
Turnout		1,562	44.9	▼12.1
Registered electors		3,860		
Labour hold		Swing	▲2.7	

=== Arran ===
Arran
Party	Candidate	Votes	%	±%
Conservative	Margaret Currie	1,105	46.3	▲17.1
Labour	John Sillars	782	32.8	▼9.8
SNP	James Lees	266	11.2	▼16.9
Scottish Socialist	Isla Blair	232	9.7	New
Majority		323	13.5	N/A
Turnout		2,385	61.4	▼4.9
Registered electors		3,884		
Conservative gain from Labour		Swing	▲13.4	

=== West Kilbride ===
West Kilbride
Party	Candidate	Votes	%	±%
Independent	Elizabeth McLardy	1,232	52.5	▲10.7
Conservative	Anne Wilkinson	654	27.9	▼4.8
Labour	Michael McGuire	220	9.4	New
SNP	John Willis	171	7.3	New
Socialist Labour	James McDaid	59	2.5	New
Majority		578	24.6	▲15.5
Turnout		2,346	61.1	▼8.2
Registered electors		3,838		
Independent hold		Swing	▲10.7	

== Aftermath ==
Labour retained control of the council with a reduced majority after taking 21 of the 30 seats – down by four from the previous election. The Conservatives were the second-largest party after doubling their representation on the council to four. Despite coming second on the popular vote, the SNP only managed to take three seats – an increase of one from 1999. Two independent candidates were also elected.

These would be the last council elections contested using first-past-the-post voting as proportional representation and the single transferable vote was introduced for Scottish councils from the 2007 elections.
