= Adam Marshall Diston =

Scottish journalist (1893 to 1956)

Adam Marshall Diston (1893–1956; born in Scotland) was a journalist for the Sunday Dispatch and ghostwriter for Winston Churchill. He had 'close affinities' to Oswald Mosley's British Union of Fascists. He had a military background, serving in a Scottish regiment from 1914 to 1918.

== British Union of Fascists ==
Diston had been involved with the Independent Labour Party (ILP), becoming a treasurer of its London and Southern Counties Division. Later, however, he became involved with Oswald Mosley's New Party, running in the 1931 general election as the party's prospective parliamentary candidate for Wandsworth Central. He received 424 votes (a 1.6% share). That same year, he wrote literature for the New Party, including The Sleeping Sickness of the Labour Party (1931) and, with Robert Forgan (one of the organisers of the January Club), The New Party and the ILP (1931) (written as an appeal to ILP members). He was also part of Mosley's British Union of Fascists (BUF), holding 'a high position in the Publicity Department'.

== Churchill's ghostwriter ==
In 1934, Churchill already had a number of newspaper and magazine writing commitments – Collier's, the News of the World, the Daily Mail – to which was added a regular column in the Sunday Dispatch. The editor of the newspaper, William Blackwood, wanted rights to Churchill's older material, which would be reworked by one of the Dispatch journalists, Adam Marshall Diston. Churchill was to produce one new piece out of every four published by the paper. Later in the year, due to increased demands on him, Churchill asked William Blackwood to prepare an outline for his next column, to which Blackwood responded with a complete article, ghostwritten by Diston, which went to print without the need for changes. Blackwood told Churchill that Diston was a 'splendid journalist' and recommended him to be Churchill's full-time ghostwriter, should Churchill be interested in one. Churchill took Diston into employment two weeks later, which was 'the start of a partnership that would flourish for the rest of the decade'. As Churchill's employee, Diston started on Churchill's remaining Collier's articles for the year, being paid £15 from the £350 commission Churchill received for each article.

By the end of the following year (1935), Diston had already prepared most of Churchill's 'The Great Men I Have Known' series for the News of the World in Britain and Collier's in the USA, due to appear from January 1936. Sir Emsley Carr, the British newspaper's chairman, enjoyed them so much he immediately signed up Churchill for a series in 1937. William Chenery, however, demanded changes to the articles on 'Rockefeller' and 'Charles Chaplin' for Collier's because he considered them 'written in a form better calculated to meet the requirements of English than American mass magazines'. In November 1937 Churchill sent eight articles to the News of the World for serial publication the following year – these, too, were largely written by Diston. In a letter accompanying the articles, Churchill hinted to Colonel Percy Davies, the newspaper's general manager, that he wanted to secure a new contract for 1938, which he received.

Churchill had little input on a number of articles ghostwritten by Diston. When reworking older pieces, Diston would add original material: for example, when reworking an article on French, in the manuscript's first three pages only one paragraph was from Churchill's original article. Diston made insertions like this at his own discretion, informing Churchill after completing the writing. Indeed, a number of Churchill's articles were written in their entirety by Diston. Churchill would also give guidelines to Diston on what to include in articles and leave Diston to produce the piece. In one letter to Diston dated 10 October 1937, Churchill wrote: "I hope you find my notes on the amusement article a help. Do not let them cramp your style or feel any obligation to use them." Churchill liked Diston's writing: in a letter dated 26 October 1935 from Violet Pearman, Churchill's chief secretary, Pearman informs Diston:

'I am asked by Mr Churchill to send you herewith the article on Lloyd George. Mr Churchill says that this is the one he likes the least, as the fitting in of the reviews does not hang at all well with your own material. Would you therefore please put in much more of your own composition, as it is so good'.

Also in 1937, Churchill was commissioned to write an article for the American magazine Liberty on the so-called Jewish problem. Diston probably ghostwrote the article for Churchill, for which Churchill paid him in full. Churchill made some handwritten marks on the draft and the article was sent for typing without correction. The article repeated the popular idea that Jews brought antisemitism on themselves by remaining distanced and separate from the rest of society, and it repeated offensive stereotypes of Shylock and his "pound of flesh", Jewish usurers, and "Hebrew bloodsuckers". In part, the article, entitled 'How the Jews can Combat Persecution', said:

The Jew in England is a representative of his race. Every Jewish money-lender recalls Shylock and the idea of the Jews as usurers. And you cannot reasonably expect a struggling clerk or shopkeeper, paying forty or fifty per cent interest on borrowed money to a "Hebrew bloodsucker" to reflect that, throughout long centuries, almost every other way of life was closed to the Jewish people; or that there are native English moneylenders who insist, just as implacably, upon their "pound of flesh".

In the end the article was not published, despite Churchill's repeated efforts to sell it. Collier's, to whom Churchill was already contracted to write, objected to one of Churchill's article potentially appearing in Liberty, a rival US publication, so the article was withdrawn from its original outlet. Following this, Churchill tried to have the article published in the British Strand Magazine, but it had already recently run a similar article by former Prime Minister David Lloyd George and declined. According to Richard Toye, based on this string of events, 'Churchill was entirely happy to put the article out in his own name and thus take responsibility for the views it expressed'. In 1940 Charles Eade, Sunday Dispatch editor, who was republishing some of Churchill's older journalism, came across the article and approached Churchill on 7 March about publishing it, saying, 'I see no reason why Mr Churchill should not agree to [the article being printed in the Sunday Dispatch], but the question of Jews is a rather provocative one, and I thought I should ask his permission before going ahead with this particular contribution'. Churchill declined the offer, his office writing to the newspaper that it would be 'inadvisable to publish the article 'How the Jews can combat Persecution' at the present time'.
