= 1995 North Ayrshire Council election =

North Ayrshire Council election

← 1992	6 April 1995	1999 →

All 30 seats to North Ayrshire Council 16 seats needed for a majority
- Registered: 105,812
- Turnout: 45.6% (Note: Excludes uncontested wards.)
	First party	Second party	Third party
	Lab	SNP	Con
Party	Labour	SNP	Conservative
Last election	20 seats, 43.9%	3 seats, 24.3%	6 seats, 24.1%
Seats won	26	1	1
Seat change	▲6	▼2	▼5
Popular vote	26,024	11,565	5,508
Percentage	55.9%	24.8%	11.8%
Swing	▲12.0	▲0.5	▼12.3
- The result of the election
Council Leader before election
Labour
Council Leader after election
Labour

Elections to North Ayrshire Council were held on 6 April 1995, on the same day as the other Scottish local government elections. This was the first election to the council following the implementation of the Local Government etc. (Scotland) Act 1994.

The election used the 30 wards created by the Formation Electoral Arrangements in 1995. Each ward elected one councillor using first-past-the-post voting.

Labour won control of the council by taking 26 of the 30 seats and over half of the popular vote. The Scottish National Party (SNP) and the Conservatives both won one seat and one independent candidate was elected.

== Background ==
Local government reforms were brought in following the implementation of the Local Government etc. (Scotland) Act 1994. The two-tier system of districts, regions and island areas would be replaced by a system of 32 unitary authorities with the first elections taking place in 1995. North Ayrshire Council replaced the former Cunninghame District Council and also took on the responsibilities of the regional council, Strathclyde, which was abolished.

At the previous election to Cunninghame District Council in 1992, Labour had lost some ground but retained control of the council after winning two-thirds of the seats. The Conservatives remained the second-largest party after taking six seats while the Scottish National Party won three seats.

Prior to the local government reforms, the Second Statutory Reviews of Electoral Arrangements had been conducted by the Local Government Boundary Commission for Scotland and recommended changes to ward boundaries in Cunninghame and maintained the number of wards at 30. Following the reforms, Allan Stewart MP, Parliamentary Under-Secretary of State for Scotland, implemented the second review for Cunninghame as the Foundation Electoral Arrangements for North Ayrshire through The North Ayrshire Local Government Area (Electoral Arrangements) Direction 1994.

Following the death of a candidate, the poll in Stevenston North was postponed and the seat was vacant following the election.

== Results ==
1995 North Ayrshire Council election result
Party	Seats	Gains	Losses	Net gain/loss	Seats %	Votes %	Votes	+/−
Labour	26			▲6	86.7	55.9	26,024	▲12.0
SNP	1			▼2	3.3	24.8	11,565	▲0.5
Conservative	1			▼5	3.3	11.8	5,508	▼12.3
Independent	1			▲1	0.0	3.4	1,581	▲1.3
Liberal Democrats	0			Steady	0.0	2.8	1,323	▲1.1
Moderates	0			▼1	0.0	1.3	593	▼1.7
Vacant	1			▲1	3.3	N/A	N/A	N/A
Total	30						46,594	

== Ward results ==
=== Irvine West ===
Irvine West
Party	Candidate	Votes	%	±%
Labour	David O'Neill	768	60.5	▲12.3
SNP	Catherine McKenzie	501	39.5	▲5.6
Majority		267	21.0	▲6.6
Turnout		1,269	42.5	▲6.7
Registered electors		2,988		
Labour hold		Swing	▲12.3	

=== West Kilbride and Fairlie ===
West Kilbride and Fairlie
Party	Candidate	Votes	%	±%
Independent	Elizabeth McLardy	908	36.3	New
Conservative	Edith Clarkson	817	32.7	▼33.2
Labour	Francis McCann	553	22.1	New
Liberal Democrats	Elizabeth Mackie	168	6.7	New
Independent	Stanley Kellock	52	2.1	New
Majority		91	0.0	▲0.0
Turnout		2,498	56.5	▲0.0
Registered electors		4,354		
Independent gain from Conservative and Unionist Party		Swing	▲0.0	

=== Arran ===
Arran
Party	Candidate	Votes	%	±%
Labour	John Sillars	1,010	50.0	▲10.2
Conservative	Thomas Knox	529	26.2	▼17.3
SNP	Malcolm Kerr	410	20.3	▲3.7
Liberal Democrats	John Roberts	71	3.5	New
Majority		481	23.8	N/A
Turnout		2,020	54.9	▲3.7
Registered electors		3,586		
Labour gain from Conservative		Swing	▲10.2	

== Aftermath ==
Labour won control of the council by taking 26 of the 29 seats that were up for election – six more than the previous Cunninghame District Council election. They took more than half the popular vote and increased their vote share by 12 percentage points. Both the Conservatives and the SNP lost ground as they won one seat each. The Conservatives lost five seats and saw their vote share collapse while the SNP lost two seats despite increasing their vote share by half of a percentage point.
