= Kilbirnie and Beith (ward) =

Former electoral ward in North Ayrshire

- North Ayrshire
- Boundary of Kilbirnie and Beith in North Ayrshire from 2017–2022.
- Electorate: 10,600 (2017)
- Major settlements: Beith; Kilbirnie
- Scottish Parliament constituency: Cunninghame North
- Scottish Parliament region: West Scotland
- UK Parliament constituency: North Ayrshire and Arran

2007–2022
- Number of councillors: 3
- Replaced by: Garnock Valley
- Created from: Beith; Garnock East; Kilbirnie North; Kilbirnie South; Largs South and Fairlie

Kilbirnie and Beith was one of the 10 wards used to elect members of North Ayrshire Council. Created in 2007 following the Fourth Statutory Reviews of Electoral Arrangements, the ward elected three councillors using the single transferable vote electoral system. As a result of the Islands (Scotland) Act 2018, the ward was abolished in 2022.

The area was politically split after each election returned one councillor for both the Scottish National Party (SNP) and Labour as well as one independent councillor.

== Boundaries ==
The ward was created following the Fourth Statutory Reviews of Electoral Arrangements ahead of the 2007 Scottish local elections. As a result of the Local Governance (Scotland) Act 2004, local elections in Scotland would use the single transferable vote electoral system from 2007 onwards so Kilbirnie and Beith was formed from an amalgamation of several previous first-past-the-post wards. It contained part of the former Garnock East and Kilbirnie South wards and the majority of the former Kilbirnie North ward as well as all of the former Beith ward and a small part of the former Largs South and Fairlie ward. Kilbirnie and Beith took in an area in the northeast of the council area next to its border with Renfrewshire and East Renfrewshire and centred around the towns of Beith and Kilbirnie. Following the Fifth Statutory Reviews of Electoral Arrangements ahead of the 2017 Scottish local elections, the ward was reduced in area as largely unpopulated areas were transferred to other wards. The eastern boundary was moved west to run along the A737 with the area transferred to the Dalry and West Kilbride ward.

In 2018, the Scottish Parliament passed the Islands (Scotland) Act 2018 which included provisions to improve the representation of island communities on councils. As a result, an intermediate review of the boundaries in North Ayrshire was carried out. The review coincided with the introduction of the Scottish Elections (Reform) Act 2020 which allowed for the creation of five-member wards. This proposed that three wards – Dalry and West Kilbride, Kilbirnie and Beith and North Coast and Cumbraes – be replaced by two new wards named Garnock Valley and North Coast. The proposals for North Ayrshire were subsequently approved by the Scottish Parliament and the ward was abolished in 2022.

== Councillors ==
Election	Councillors		
2007	Jean Highgate (Ind.)	Craig Taylor (SNP)	John Bell (Labour)
2008	Jean Highgate (Ind.)	Anthea Dickson (SNP)	John Bell (Labour)
2012	Jean Highgate (Ind.)	Anthea Dickson (SNP)	John Bell (Labour)
2017	Donald L. Reid (Ind.)	Anthea Dickson (SNP)	John Bell (Labour)

== Election results ==
=== 2017 election ===
Kilbirnie and Beith - 3 seats
Party	Candidate	FPv%	Count				
Party	Candidate	FPv%	1	2	3	4	5
SNP	Anthea Dickson (incumbent)	22.3	1,057	1,061	1,091	1,617	
Independent	Donald L. Reid	22.2	1,053	1,074	1,182	1,203	
Labour	John Bell (incumbent)	19.5	925	1,031	1,062	1,096	1,235
Conservative	Ted Nevill	14.9	705	712	731	735	751
SNP	Margaret Johnson	12.1	574	576	610		
Independent	James Smith	5.6	263	267			
Labour	James Robson	3.3	156				
Electorate: 10,600 Valid: 4,733 Spoilt: 122 Quota: 1,184 Turnout: 45.8%

=== 2012 election ===
Kilbirnie and Beith - 3 seats
Party	Candidate	FPv%	Count							
Party	Candidate	FPv%	1	2	3	4	5	6	7	8
SNP	Anthea Dickson (incumbent)	24.8	1,101	1,107	1,121					
Independent	Jean Highgate (incumbent)	17.1	758	767	804	804	910	947	1,000	1,368
SNP	Craig Wilson	17.1	762	763	771	778	807	853	886	
Labour	John Bell (incumbent)	17.0	756	765	773	773	785	1,370		
Labour	Allan Wilson	16.2	721	727	731	731	745			
Conservative	Ted Nevill	5.1	228	228	231	231				
Independent	Josh McCormick	1.7	77	81						
Socialist Labour	Tristan Lindsay	0.9	41							
Electorate: 10,662 Valid: 4,444 Spoilt: 97 Quota: 1,112 Turnout: 41.7%

=== 2008 by-election ===
A by-election arose in the Kilbirnie and Beith Ward following the death of SNP councillor Craig Taylor. Anthea Dickson held the seat for the SNP on 11 December 2008.

Kilbirnie and Beith by-election (11 December 2008) - 1 seat
Party	Candidate	FPv%	Count		
Party	Candidate	FPv%	1	2	3
SNP	Anthea Dickson	48.9	1,363	1,380	1,415
Labour	Gordon McKay	33.7	939	956	972
Conservative	Ted Nevill	11.6	322	324	342
Liberal Democrats	Lewis Hutton	3.4	94	104	
Socialist Labour	James McDaid	2.4	68		
Electorate: 11,232 Valid: 2,786 Spoilt: 20 Quota: 1,394 Turnout: 25.0%

=== 2007 election ===
Kilbirnie and Beith - 3 seats
Party	Candidate	FPv%	Count								
Party	Candidate	FPv%	1	2	3	4	5	6	7	8	9
SNP	Craig Taylor	23.4	1,329	1,349	1,366	1,397	1,450				
Labour	John Bell	23.1	1,313	1,324	1,337	1,373	1,382	1,386	1,467		
Independent	Jean Highgate	16.7	947	958	993	1,024	1,151	1,157	1,371	1,374	1,810
Labour	Donald Reid	15.0	849	854	856	878	930	933	986	1,019	
Conservative	John Smith	9.9	562	569	570	595	607	610			
Independent	John Johnstone	4.7	265	281	296	309					
Liberal Democrats	Jenny Hutton	3.3	188	191	197						
Independent	William Fyfe	2.0	116	123							
Independent	Iain Walker	1.9	106								
Electorate: 11,058 Valid: 5,675 Spoilt: 132 Quota: 1,419 Turnout: 52.5%
