= 1984 Cunninghame District Council election =

Cunninghame District Council election

- 3 May 1984

All 30 seats to Cunninghame District Council 16 seats needed for a majority
- Registered: 104,682
- Turnout: 45.0%
	First party	Second party
	Lab	Con
Party	Labour	Conservative
Last election	21 seats, 46.4%	5 seats, 21.5%
Seats won	23	5
Seat change	▲2	Steady
Popular vote	26,482	10,260
Percentage	56.4%	21.9%
Swing	▲10.0	▲0.4
Council Leader before election
Labour
Council Leader after election
Labour

Elections to Cunninghame District Council were held on 3 May 1984, on the same day as the other Scottish local government elections. This was the fourth election to the district council following the local government reforms in 1974.

The election used the 30 wards created by the Initial Statutory Reviews of Electoral Arrangements in 1979. Each ward elected one councillor using first-past-the-post voting.

Labour retained control of the council after taking more than half the popular vote and winning 23 of the 30 seats – an increase of two from 1980. The Conservatives retained all five of their seats to remain as the second largest party while the Scottish National Party (SNP) lost all their representation on the council just seven years after winning a plurality of seats.

== Background ==
Following the implementation of the Local Government (Scotland) Act 1973, a two-tier system of local government comprising nine regions, 53 districts and three island areas was introduced the following year. The 1984 elections would be the fourth district elections since their establishment.

Labour had regained control of the council following the previous election in 1980. The party's vote rebounded after the 1977 election and they won a majority – 21 – of the 30 seats. The Conservatives leapfrogged the Scottish National Party (SNP) into second place by increasing their representation on the council to five members despite a drop in vote share. The SNP fell from the largest party in 1977 to third in 1980, winning just two seats – down from 11. One Moderate and one independent candidate were elected.

Boundary changes had occurred prior to the previous election following the completion of the Initial Statutory Reviews of Electoral Arrangements for Cunninghame in 1979. This was the second election contested on the new boundaries which saw an increase of six seats from 24 to 30.

In 1981, an electoral alliance was formed between the Liberal Party and the Social Democratic Party. This would last until the parties merged in 1988 to form the Scottish Social and Liberal Democrats (SSLD), later renamed the Liberal Democrats. Both parties contested the 1984 district elections but only one party would contest any given seat.

== Results ==
1984 Cunninghame District Council election result
Party	Seats	Gains	Losses	Net gain/loss	Seats %	Votes %	Votes	+/−
Labour	23	2	0	▲2	76.7	56.4	26,482	▲10.0
Conservative	5	0	0	Steady	20.8	21.9	10,260	▲0.4
Independent	1	0	0	Steady	3.3	4.1	1,930	▲0.4
Moderates	1	0	0	Steady	3.3	2.1	1,027	▼0.2
SNP	0	0	2	▼2	0.0	11.4	5,360	▼14.4
Liberal	0	0	0	Steady	0.0	2.5	1,188	▲2.4
SDP	0	0	0	Steady	0.0	0.8	407	New
Independent Labour	0	0	0	Steady	0.0	0.5	261	New
Total	30						46,918	

== Ward results ==
=== Irvine West ===
Irvine West
Party	Candidate	Votes	%	±%
Labour	D. O'Neill	916	57.1	▼3.5
SNP	M. Brown	424	26.5	New
Independent	J. Smith	263	16.4	New
Majority		338	20.6	▼0.7
Turnout		1,603	53.7	▼0.9
Registered electors		2,986		
Labour hold		Swing	▼1.7	

=== Arran ===
Arran
Party	Candidate	Votes	%	±%
Independent	E. Sillars	1,100	74.1	▼0.7
Labour	J. Sillars	363	24.5	▲0.9
Majority		737	49.6	▼0.6
Turnout		1,463	44.9	▼0.9
Registered electors		3,306		
Independent hold		Swing	▼0.3	

== Aftermath ==
Labour strengthened their grip on the council by winning more than half the popular vote – 56.4% – and increasing their representation on the council by two to 23. The Conservatives retained their five seats with a slightly increased vote share while one Moderate and one independent candidate were elected. The SNP – who had won the election in 1977 – saw their vote share drop by 14 percentage points as they lost all their representation on the council.
