= 1961 Kesteven County Council election =

1961 UK local government election

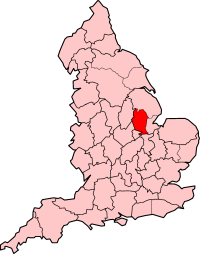
The administrative county of Kesteven (1889–1974), shown within England.

Elections to Kesteven County Council were held on Saturday, 15 April 1961. Kesteven was one of three divisions of the historic county of Lincolnshire in England; it consisted of the ancient wapentakes (or hundreds) of Aswardhurn, Aveland, Beltisloe, Boothby Graffoe, Flaxwell, Langoe, Loveden, Ness, and Winnibriggs and Threo. The Local Government Act 1888 established Kesteven as an administrative county, governed by a Council; elections were held every three years from 1889, until it was abolished by the Local Government Act 1972, which established Lincolnshire County Council in its place.

The county was divided into 60 electoral divisions, each of which returned one member. In 1961 there were contests in 7 of these.

== Results by division ==
Division	Candidate	Party	Votes	Retiring member?
Ancaster	T. A. H. Coltman	Ind		
Bassingham	T. W. Mawer	Ind		
Bennington	F. Winter	Ind		
Billingborough	Mrs C. A. Baker	Ind		
Billinghay	B. Tomlinson	Ind		
Bourne no. 1	G. A. F. Holloway	Ind		
Bourne no. 2	W. M. Friend	Ind		
Bracebridge	H. E. Hough	Lab	520	
Bracebridge	F. L. Wand	Ind	483	n
Branston	J. R. Wilkinson	Ind		
Bytham	J. H. Turner	Ind		
Caythorpe	H. P. Kelway	Ind		
Claypole	F. McCallum	Ind		
Colsterworth	Mrs C. L. Jacques	Ind		
Corby	John Hedley Lewis	Ind		
Cranwell	Sqn Ldr W. J. Bangay	Ind		n
Deeping St James	C. G. Crowson	Ind		
Dunston	J. Ireson	Ind		
Gonerby and Barrowby	J. E. Snell	Lab		
Grantham no. 1	A. E. Bellamy	Lab	452	
Grantham no. 1	J. W. O'Neill	Lib	238	n
Grantham no. 2	W. Bevan	Lab		
Grantham no. 3	J. W. Harrison	Lab		
Grantham no. 4	J. H. Jennings	Lab		
Grantham no. 5	P. Newton	Ind		n
Grantham no. 6	Mrs A. S. Mottershaw	Lab		
Grantham no. 7	A. Syddall	Ind		
Grantham no. 8	W. A. Garratt	Ind		
Grantham no. 9	G. E. Waltham	Lab		
Grantham no. 10	O. P. Hudson	Cons	475	n
Grantham no. 10	Mrs H. Smith	Lab	392	
Heckington	J. Q. M. Longstaff	Ind		n
Helpringham	S. P. King	Lab		
Kyme	S. T. Wood			
Leadenham	W. Reeve	Ind		
Market Deeping	J. W. Cave	Ind		
Martin	H. C. Rothery	Ind		
Metheringham	F. C. Townsend	Ind		
Morton	J. A. Galletly	Ind		
Navenby	C. E. Marshall	Ind	425	n
Navenby	J. G. Ruddock	Ind	152	n
North Hykeham	Mrs M. Large	Lab	1044	
North Hykeham	S. Roe	Cons	727	n
Osbournby	Mrs N. Robson	Ind	252	
Osbournby	T. Fairchild	Ind	144	n
Ponton	R. W. Newton	Ind		
Rippingale	H. Scarborough	Lab		
Ropsley	W. J. W. Cheesman	Ind		n
Ruskington	E. Skinks	Lab	572	n
Ruskington	T. Hall	Cons	549	n
Scopwick	H. Waudby			
Skellingthorpe	R. C. Turner	Ind		
Sleaford no. 1	C. J. Barnes			
Sleaford no. 2	W. H. Owen	Ind		
Sleaford no. 3	M. W. L. Brown	Ind		n
Stamford no. 1	Mrs G. M. Boyfield	Lab		
Stamford no. 2	E. D. Ireson	Ind		n
Stamford no. 3	J. H. W. Taylor	Ind		
Stamford no. 4	Mrs A. Fancourt	Ind		
Stamford no. 5	Mrs M. I. James (Note: No nomination was received, so the retiring member was deemed re-elected)	Ind		
Swinderby	H. N. Nevile	Ind		
Thurlby	G. A. Griffin	Ind		
Uffington	R. Burman	Ind		
Washingborough	G. E. Capps	Ind		
Welby	A. H. Thorold	Ind		
Wilsford	A. F. S. Dean	Ind		
Woolsthorpe	H. H. Brownlow	Ind		
