= Ulster Protestant League (1931) =

Former Protestant supremacist group

- Founded: 1931
- Ideology: Religious conservatism Anti-Catholicism; Ulster unionism
- Religion: Protestantism

The Ulster Protestant League (UPL) was an anti-Catholic supremacist loyalist organisation in Northern Ireland.

The organisation was established in 1931 by a group inspired in part by the example of the Scottish Protestant League. It initially had some links with the Ulster Unionist Party (UUP), and UUP members such as James Hanna McCormick attended its meetings.

The UPL complained that, during a time of economic depression, some jobs were being given to Roman Catholics, proposing that unemployed Protestants should be given priority. It also raised concerns that some Catholics were allowed to work in organisations such as the Royal Ulster Constabulary, and noted that some Orange Order marches were occasionally banned by the government of Northern Ireland.

In 1932, the UPL campaigned against the Outdoor Relief Strike, a cross-community protest for improved unemployment benefits. They claimed that the strike was a cloak for "the communist Sinn Fein element to attempt to start a revolution in our province", and congratulated the government on breaking up the strike.

The Catholic Truth Society organised a Eucharistic Congress at the Ulster Hall in 1934, but this was called off after the UPL organised large protests in central Belfast. Two demonstrators, UPL leader Dorothy Harnett and Presbyterian minister Samuel Hanna, were convicted of incitement to disorder.

By the mid-1930s, the UPL was in sharp opposition to the ruling Ulster Unionist Party, which they regarded as untrustworthy and soft on Catholics. Members of the group were active in anti-Catholic riots in 1935, and later in the year, some members gained seats in local elections. Beginning in 1931 the UPL carried out "a campaign of vilification against the catholics." The group announced a new policy on Catholics: "neither to talk with, nor walk with, neither to buy nor sell, borrow nor lend, take nor give, or to have any dealings with them at all, nor for employers to employ them nor employees to work with them."

The UUP were concerned at the growing Protestant discontent and sought to move closer to the Orange Order. By the 1938 Northern Ireland general election, the UPL was in decline, and the main loyalist challenge to the UUP came from the Ulster Progressive Unionist Association, although independent Unionist John William Nixon who had become close to the UPL retained his seat, and the UPL candidate in Belfast Willowfield took 34.9% of the votes cast.

The UPL remained active until the start of World War II. During the late 1930s, it organised in support of Franco's Nationalists in the Spanish Civil War, and organised heckling at socialist meetings.
