= Scottish Democratic Fascist Party =

- Abbreviation: SDFP
- Leader: William Weir Gilmour
- Founded: March 1933
- Dissolved: October 1933
- Split from: New Party (UK)
- Preceded by: Scottish Protestant League, Protestant Action Society
- Headquarters: Edinburgh, Scotland
- Newspaper: Commonwealth
- Ideology: Fascism; Scottish nationalism Scottish independence Fascist corporatism Anti-Catholicism; Anti-Irish sentiment Anti-capitalism; Anti-communism; Antisemitism
- Political position: Far-right
- Religion: Protestantism

The Scottish Democratic Fascist Party (SDFP) or Scottish Fascist Democratic Party was a political party in Scotland. It was founded in 1933 out of the Scottish section of the New Party by William Weir Gilmour and Major Hume Sleigh.

== Party platform ==
The party charter emphasised:

- "absolute independence and self-government for Scotland"
- establishment of a Scottish Corporate Commonwealth
- a Scottish Parliament based on industrial representation
- establishment of a permanent Empire and Colonial Secretariat
- prohibition of Irish migration to Scotland
- expulsion of Catholic religious orders and their members from Scotland
- repeal of the Education (Scotland) Act 1918 (which allowed Catholic schools into the state system funded through education rates).

No Catholics were permitted to join the SDFP. The party explained their anti-Catholic rationale as being that the party was "Scotland First", whereas Catholics were dismissed by the party as owing their allegiance to the Pope.

The party alleged that it did not wish to establish a dictatorship. While not publicly advocating violence, the party had a "Defence Corp" to keep order at party meetings. Members of the Defence Corp wore black shirts, whilst the party uniform was a blue shirt.

Later in 1933 the party removed the more anti-Catholic elements from its platform, resulting in Alexander Ratcliffe (leader of the Scottish Protestant League) leaving the party. The party folded soon afterwards.

== Party organ ==
The monthly Commonwealth was launched as the SDFP organ on Monday 12 June 1933. Only two issues were published though, and the party failed to attract wide support.

== Relations with the BUF ==
Despite being formed out of the Scottish section of Oswald Mosley's New Party, the SDFP was at odds with Mosley's larger British Union of Fascists, particularly over the issue of Catholicism. In contrast to the SDFP, the BUF was accepting of Catholics, with Catholics making up a high percentage of the BUF membership, particularly in Northern England. This led to William Weir Gilmour denouncing the BUF as "run by Roman Catholics, organised by Roman Catholics, in the interests of Roman Catholics." Gilmour later opined that the SDFP's virulent anti-Catholicism may have unintentionally undermined fascism in Scotland by putting off prospective Catholic recruits.
