= Esta Henry =

British antiques dealer (1882–1963)

- Esta Henry in her shop
- Born: 1882; Sunderland
- Died: 1963 (aged 80–81); São Paulo, Brazil
- Other names: Esther Henry, Esther Louis
- Occupation: Antique dealer

Esta or Esther Henry (1882–17 January 1963) was an antiques dealer in Edinburgh, Scotland. Born in Sunderland, in her time she was the subject of news stories in many countries and known for her eccentric behavior. Sometimes called "Mrs. Scotland" in the press, she had ties to a number of notable people and events, including British queens and the auction of the collections of King Farouk of Egypt. She was born Esther Louis daughter of Louis Louis and Eveline Jackson. She married her first husband James H (Jacob) Henry on 28 August 1902 in Edinburgh.

== Henry's shop ==
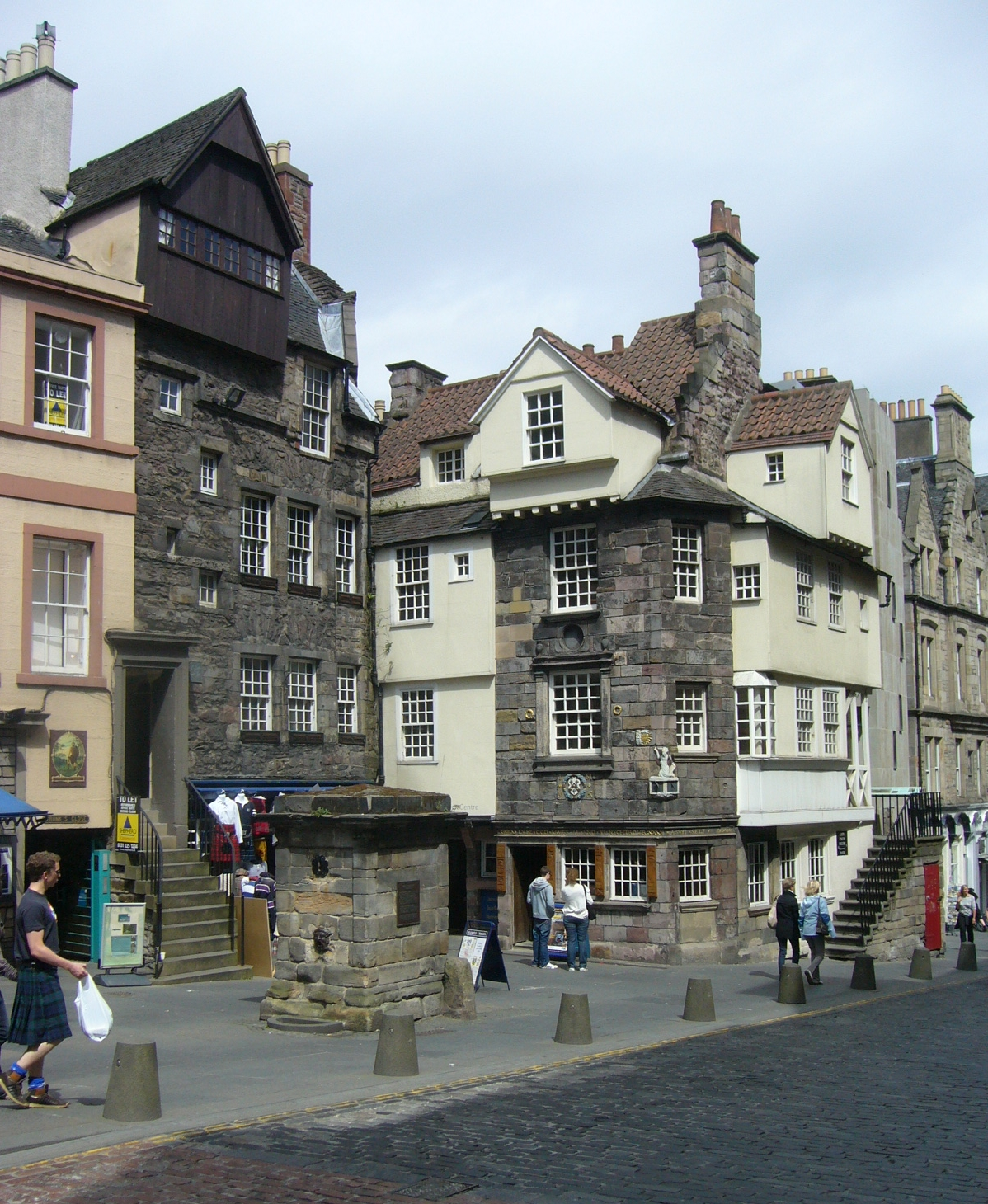
Moubray House (to the left) and John Knox House on the High Street, near the Netherbow Port, on the Royal Mile, Edinburgh.

Henry ran an antiques business out of a shop called The Luckenbooth in Moubray House, the oldest building on the Royal Mile in Edinburgh. A luckenbooth is a heart-shaped Scottish brooch named for the shops in the Luckenbooths tenements where jewelry was once sold. Moubray House is next to the John Knox House and is the oldest occupied building in the city. Most records state that Robert Moubray built the original house in 1477. The property itself has gone through many rebuilds and renovations and was gifted to Historic Scotland, the association responsible for historic monuments, in 2012.

The antique shop on the Royal Mile was "a favourite haunt" of Queen Mary (Mary of Teck), and visited by the Queen (Queen Elizabeth The Queen Mother) and Princess Margaret, in 1948. During the visit, Esta Henry took them to see the flat above the shop in Moubray House, where the Queen Mother said she "would like to live on the Royal Mile".

== Jewelry theft ==
On 1 May 1953, £650 of the "Hungarian crown jewels collection" was stolen from Henry's shop. The gems were later found at 22 St. Stephen's road in Canterbury. Henry agreed to pay £15 to the owner of the shop, Barnett Lee, to recover her property. The aquamarine, diamond and platinum brooch was sold to Lee (in parts) for £60, by one of two men who had been sentenced at the High Court in Edinburgh for the theft.

It is possible that these items were stolen from Henry by Archibald Hall, alias Roy Fontaine. Although he was caught and jailed for his crimes, Hall used the proceeds of his thefts in Scotland to move to London. In England he became infamous for infiltrating high class society, committing robberies, and killing a number of his targets. In 1978, Hall was found guilty of murder and sentenced to two life-terms. He died in Kingston Prison, Portsmouth in 2002. A screenplay for a film about Hall, called Monster Butler, was written by Peter Bellwood.

According to A. M. Nicol in the 2011 book, The Monster Butler, Hall claimed that he planned the theft that was Scotland's biggest jewel robbery. He devised a scheme with his accomplice, John Wootton, whom he met in prison. Together they took approximately £100,000 in goods from a tin box at the back of Henry's shop and went to Torquay. After hiding some of the jewels, they were arrested and sent to Edinburgh. Nicol writes, "the prosecution offered them a deal which involved the true value of the jewels not being made public". Nicol posits that Hall's story is a fabrication and the actual was an "opportunistic sneak theft" for a great deal less value.

== King Farouk's auction ==
Farouk I of Egypt was the king of Egypt and Sudan, following his father Fuad I of Egypt, in 1936. He was known for his extensive collection including decorated horological instruments, coins and pornographic art. In 1952, Farouk was deposed by the Egyptian government. His collections were auctioned in February 1954 to return the money spent by Farouk to Egypt's treasury. News of the auction was reported throughout the world, and Henry was the subject of a number of these articles.

The auction was run by the new government, not professional auctioneers, which resulted in unusual circumstances. During the auction, Henry protested that she could not see and left the salesroom; the supervisors followed her to make amends. Two days earlier, Henry insisted that they conduct the auction in English as well as French and Egyptian, and they complied. At one point Henry grabbed a clock from the stand in the middle of bidding, "When I saw it I rushed up and shouted, lay off—this is for Scotland. If any twister breaks my bid I'll break his neck."

Henry spent over 10,000 pounds sterling at the auction held at the Koubbeh Palace in Cairo, and purchased some items made in Britain; "It gives me pleasure to see rare treasures in their rightful places", she said. One of these was a star shaped watch made by David Ramsay in the 17th century.

During the trip, Henry spoke to a group of women who were holding a starvation strike at the Cairo Press Club to gain the right to vote. The women were members of Daughters of the Nile (Bint El Nil), led by 36-year-old Doria Shafik.

They tried to get me to talk politics. All I said was, 'I believe in Scotland for the Scots, England for the English, Egypt for the Egyptians, and equal rights for women.'

— Esta Henry, The Sydney Morning Herald

== Personal life ==
Henry claimed to have started in the antique business 'shoving a hawker's barrow out of Jane Street' at the age of 9, "I started with a pushbike and 30 bob, I lived in one room which was also the shop."

Henry performed secret acts of charity to local families, and was elected councillor to Edinburgh of one of the Canongate wards in 1936. Although she was Jewish, Henry had campaigned under a Protestant Action banner, supporting Protestant leader John Cormack. Shortly after her election Cormack announced he and Henry would stand for Parliament at the next UK general election, but in fact Henry soon left Protestant Action. Tom Gallagher believes Henry was not anti-Catholic, but joined Protestant Action as a means to become a councillor. Kenneth Baxter concurs with this view noting among other evidence the facts that she had previously sought election to Edinburgh Council as 'Moderate/Progressive' candidate without success on five previous occasions and in October 1936 had been intending to stand as an 'Independent Progressive'.

Henry was widowed in 1947 at the age of 64, and left with 2 daughters and 3 sons.

In 1953, a Romanian art dealer named Pinchas Haimovici was held in Saughton Prison, Edinburgh, pending deportation for entering the country on a false passport with the name Paul Eugene Dillon (a Belgian named Paul Dijon in other sources). Esta Henry previously met Haimovici, who was 20 years her junior, when he came into her shop in Moubray House. She did not believe his claims and determined to help him, after which he surrendered voluntarily to the court. After his release by the Sheriff Court, he was arrested again as an alien to be deported. Haimovici appealed the order made by the Home Secretary, claiming that he would be put to death as anti-Communist if he was returned to Romania. Henry declared that she "loved Paul" and she would marry him and take care of all his financial needs (presumably to legalize his position in Scotland). They married shortly after his second release and Haimovici changed his name to Paul Henry.

Sculptor Benno Schotz created a piece called Paul and Esta Henry, shown at the Royal Academy of Arts in 1954.

From 1955 to 1961 Henry served as a member of the ruling council of the influential Edinburgh conservationist group the Cockburn Association.

Esta and Paul Henry died on 17 January 1963, in an air crash in São Paulo, Brazil, returning from a "belated honeymoon". Henry's antiques were taken over by her son Louis Henry.
