= Fishing Party (Scotland) =

Political party in Scotland from 2003 to 2004

- Leader: George Geddes
- Founded: 2003
- Dissolved: 2004
- Ideology: Single issue

The Fishing Party was a political party in Scotland formed and officially registered in 2003. Largely a single-issue party, its formation was prompted by those involved in the fishing industry angry at cuts in the quantity of fish they were being allowed to catch as a result of the European Union Single Fisheries Policy. The rationale behind its formation was that they were in the best position to represent the fishing industry as they were part of it themselves. The party was led by George Geddes, formerly vice chairman of the Scottish White Fish Producers' Association, supported by the then Chairman Mike Park, with the aim of securing seats in the Scottish Parliament. The party was supported by Albert McQuarrie, the former Conservative Member of Parliament for Banff and Buchan, but he refused to stand as a candidate on the grounds of age.

There was speculation that this might result in the loss of votes for the Scottish National Party, as traditionally it has won the majority of the votes of those involved in the Scottish fishing industry. However, the Fishing Party did not win any seats in the 2003 election to the Scottish Parliament. Its only candidate, George Geddes, received 5,566 votes (2.28%) on the regional list in North East Scotland. The best result was in the Banff and Buchan Scottish constituency, where the party polled 2,007 votes (7.7%). The party did not stand any candidates in the single-member constituencies.

The party was deregistered as a political party with the Electoral Commission on 23 March 2004.
