= Student wings of political parties in Scotland =

Student wings of political parties in Scotland are university affiliated organisations of Scottish political parties, and therefore often mirror the policy direction of the larger party.

== Student organisations ==
=== Scottish Labour ===
Scottish Labour Students (SLS) are the largest student organisation in Scotland with eight university organisations. SLS is made up of affiliated Labour Clubs at universities across Scotland:

- Glasgow University Labour Club
- Edinburgh University Labour Students
  (Also includes members of Edinburgh Napier University, Heriot-Watt University, and Queen Margaret University)
- Strathclyde University Labour Club
- Stirling University Labour Society
- St Andrews University Labour Society
- Dundee University Labour Students
- Aberdeen Uni Labour Students
- University of the Highlands and Islands Labour Students

=== Scottish National Party ===
SNP Students have two university organisations, down from 10 in 2021. They campaign in favour of civic nationalism and Scottish independence. Affiliated nationalist associations at Scottish universities are:

- Glasgow University Scottish Nationalist Association
- Aberdeen University Scottish Nationalist Association

=== Scottish Conservatives ===
Scottish Young Conservatives are the joint youth and student wing of the Scottish Conservatives (colloquially known as the Tories). They advocate British conservatism and are the main right-wing student body in Scotland. Affiliates are:

- Edinburgh University Conservative & Unionists Association
- St Andrews University Conservative Association
- University of Aberdeen Conservative and Unionist Association

=== Scottish Greens ===
Scottish Young Greens are an eco-socialist organisation also advocating Scottish independence and Scottish republicanism. Affiliate groups consist of:

- Edinburgh University Young Greens
- Aberdeen University Greens

=== Scottish Liberals ===
Scottish Young Liberals do not currently have formal political societies

=== Minor socialist and communist organisations ===
- Scottish Socialist Party Glasgow University
- Scottish Socialist Youth Stirling University
- Socialist Party UWS
- YCL Glasgow University
- YCL Edinburgh University
- YCL Edinburgh Napier University
