= New Party (UK) =

British fascist political party, 1931–32

- Abbreviation: NUPA
- Leader: Sir Oswald Mosley
- Founded: 1 March 1931; 95 years ago
- Dissolved: 1932; 94 years ago
- Split from: Labour
- Merged into: British Union of Fascists (Note: (larger faction))
- Succeeded by: Scottish Democratic Fascist Party (Note: (smaller faction))
- Newspaper: New Times, Action
- Youth wing: NUPA Youth Movement
- Armed wing: Biff Boys
- Ideology: Authoritarianism; Corporatism; Economic nationalism
- Political position: Syncretic

The New Party was a political party briefly active in the United Kingdom in the early 1930s. It was formed by Sir Oswald Mosley, an MP who had belonged to both the Conservative and Labour parties, quitting Labour after its 1930 conference narrowly rejected his "Mosley Memorandum", a document he had written outlining how he would deal with the problem of unemployment through greater government intervention in the economy.

== Mosley Memorandum ==
On 6 December 1930, Mosley published an expanded version of the "Mosley Memorandum", which was signed by Mosley, his wife and fellow Labour MP Lady Cynthia and 15 other Labour MPs: Oliver Baldwin, Joseph Batey, Aneurin Bevan, W. J. Brown, William Cove, Robert Forgan, J. F. Horrabin, James Lovat-Fraser, John McGovern, John James McShane, Frank Markham, H. T. Muggeridge, Morgan Philips Price, Charles Simmons, and John Strachey. It was also signed by A. J. Cook, general secretary of the Miners' Federation of Great Britain.

== Founding the New Party ==
A flowchart showing the history of the early British fascist movement

On 28 February 1931 Mosley resigned from the Labour Party, launching the New Party the following day. The party was formed from six of the Labour MPs who signed the Mosley Manifesto (Mosley and his wife, Baldwin, Brown, Forgan and Strachey), although two (Baldwin and Brown) resigned membership after a day and sat in the House of Commons as independent MPs; Strachey resigned in June. The party received £50,000 funding from Lord Nuffield and launched a magazine called Action, edited by Harold Nicolson. In addition, Nicolson produced a New Party propaganda film titled Crisis and aimed to get it shown in the cinemas but the censors banned the film as it was considered it would "bring Parliament into disrepute" due to its depiction of MPs asleep on the benches. In the event the film was only shown at New Party meetings. Mosley also set up a party militia, the "Biff Boys" led by the England rugby captain Peter Howard.

The New Party's first electoral contest was at the Ashton-under-Lyne by-election in April 1931. The candidate was Allan Young, and his election agent was Wilfred Risdon. With a threadbare organisation they polled some 16% of the vote, splitting the Labour vote and allowing a Conservative to be returned to the Commons. Two more MPs joined the New Party later in 1931: W. E. D. Allen from the Unionists and Cecil Dudgeon from the Liberals. At the 1931 general election the New Party contested 25 seats, but only Mosley himself, and a candidate in Merthyr Tydfil (Sellick Davies stood against only one Independent Labour Party (ILP) candidate in Merthyr, while Mosley stood against both Conservative and Labour candidates in Stoke) polled a decent number of votes, and three candidates lost their deposits. Mosley's New Party general election campaign received prominent press coverage in various national newspapers during 1931 with The Manchester Guardian reporting that "The stewards were wearing rosettes of black and amber – the Mosley colours. Busy bees, hiving the honey of prosperity? That may be the symbolism of it."

== Policies ==
The New Party programme was built on the "Mosley Memorandum", advocating a national policy to meet the economic crisis that the Great Depression had brought. His desire for complete control of policy-making decisions in the New Party led many members to resign membership. He favoured granting wide powers to the government, with only general control by Parliament, and creating a five-member Cabinet without specific portfolio, similar to the War Cabinet adopted during the First World War. His economic strategy broadly followed Keynesian thinking and suggested widespread investment into housing to provide work and improve housing standards overall and also supporting protectionism with proposals for high tariff walls.

== Demise ==
After the election, Mosley toured Europe and became convinced of the virtues of fascism. Gradually, the New Party became more authoritarian, with parts of it, notably its youth movement NUPA, adopting overtly fascist thinking and the wearing of "Greyshirt" uniforms. The New Party's sharp turn to fascism led previous supporters such as John Strachey and Harold Nicolson to leave it. In 1932, Mosley united most of the various British fascist organisations to form the British Union of Fascists into which the New Party subsumed itself. Out of the Scottish section was formed the Scottish Democratic Fascist Party, headed by William Weir Gilmour.

An unrelated New Party was launched in Britain in 2003.

== Election results ==
=== By-elections, 1929–1931 ===
By-election	Candidate	Votes	% share	Position
1931 Ashton-under-Lyne by-election	Allan Young	4,472	16.0	3

=== 1931 UK general election ===
Constituency	Candidate	Votes	% share	Position
Ashton-under-Lyne	Charles B. Hobhouse	424	1.4	4
Battersea South	Leslie James Cuming	909	2.3	3
Birmingham Duddeston	Jessie Williams	284	1.06	4
Birmingham Yardley	E. J. Bartleet	479	1.0	3
Chatham	Martin F. Woodroffe	1,135	3.6	3
Coatbridge	William Weir Gilmour	674	2.13	3
Combined English Universities	Harold Nicolson	461	3.4	5
Galloway	Cecil Randolph Dudgeon	986	3.0	4
Gateshead	John Stuart Barr	1,077	1.9	3
Glasgow Cathcart	J. Mellick	529	1.5	3
Glasgow Shettleston	W. E. Stevenson	402	1.2	4
Hammersmith North	Ronald Eric Noel Braden	431	1.4	4
Limehouse	Herbert L. Hodge	307	1.4	3
Manchester Hulme	John Pratt	1,565	4.6	3
Merthyr	Sellick Davies	10,834	30.6	2
North East Derbyshire	Albert Vincent Williams	689	1.7	3
Pontypridd	William Lowell	466	1.3	4
Reading	E. R. Troward	861	1.6	3
Sheffield Brightside	E. C. Snelgrove	847	2.2	4
Stoke	Oswald Mosley	10,534	24.1	3
Shipley	W. J. Leaper	601	1.4	3
Wandsworth Central	A. M. Diston	424	1.6	3
West Renfrewshire	Robert Forgan	1,304	4.0	4
Whitechapel and St Georges	Ted Lewis	154	0.7	4

== See also ==
- List of Labour Party breakaway parties (UK)

== Sources ==
- Benewick R. The Fascist Movement in Britain (1972)
- Dorril, Stephen. Blackshirt, Viking Publishing, 2006 ISBN 0-670-86999-6
- Mandle, W.F. "The New Party," Historical Studies. Australia and New Zealand Vol.XII. Issue 47 (1966)
- Pugh, Martin. Hurrah for the Blackshirts!': Fascists and Fascism in Britain between the Wars, Random House, 2005, ISBN 0-224-06439-8
- Skidelsky, Robert "The Problem of Mosley. Why a Fascist Failed," Encounter (1969) 33#192 pp 77–88.
- Skidelsky, Robert. Oswald Mosley (1975), the standard scholarly biography
- Mosley, Oswald. My Life (1968)
- Worley, Matthew. Oswald Mosley and the New Party, Palgrave Macmillan, 2010, ISBN 978-0-230-20697-7

=== Primary sources ===
- Mosley, Oswald. A National Policy 1931
- Mosley, Oswald. Unemployment 1931
- Mosley, Oswald. The National Crisis 1931
- Mosley, Oswald; Mosley, Cynthia; Strachey, John; Baldwin, Oliver; Forgan, Robert; Allen, W.E.D. Why We Left The Old Parties 1931
- Davies, Sellick. Why I Joined The New Party 1931
- Joad, C.E.M. The Case For The New Party 1931
- MacDougall, James Dunlop. Disillusionment 1931
- Diston, Adam Marshall. The Sleeping Sickness of the Labour Party 1931
- Diston, Adam Marshall; Forgan, Robert. The New Party and the I.L.P. 1931
- Allen, W.E.D. The New Party and the Old Toryism 1931
