= 1961 Salford City Council election =

Local election in Salford

- 11 May 1961

16 of 64 seats on Salford City Council 33 seats needed for a majority
	First party	Second party	Third party
Party	Labour	Conservative	Liberal
Last election	11 seats, 45.7%	5 seats, 47.4%	1 seat, 6.4%
Seats before	52	11	1
Seats won	10	5	1
Seats after	50	12	2
Seat change	▼2	▲1	▲1
Popular vote	19,013	16,278	3,436
Percentage	48.8%	41.8%	8.8%
Swing	▲3.1%	▼5.6%	▲2.4%
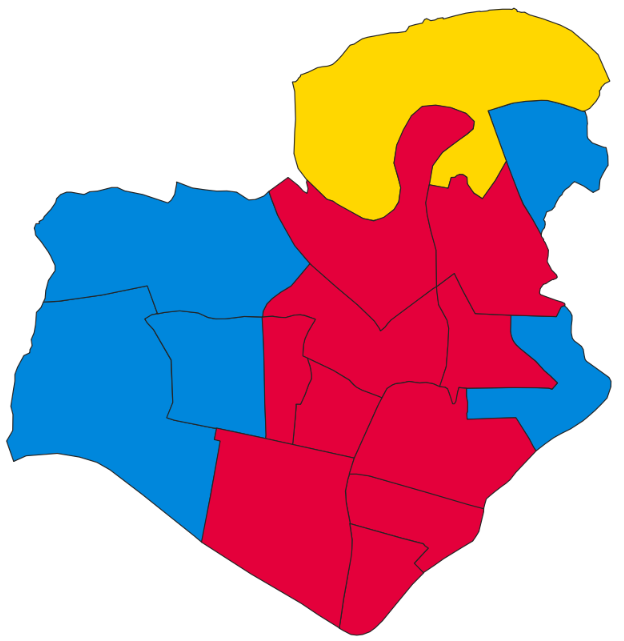
- Map of results of 1961 election
Leader of the Council before election
Labour
Leader of the Council after election
Labour

Elections to Salford City Council were held on Thursday, 11 May 1961. One-third of the councillors seats were up for election, with each successful candidate to serve a three-year term of office. The Labour Party retained overall control of the council.

== Election result ==
Party	Votes		Seats			Full Council	
Labour Party	19,013 (48.8%)	▲3.1	10 (62.5%)	10 / 16	▼2	50 (78.1%)	50 / 64
Conservative Party	16,278 (41.8%)	▼5.6	5 (31.3%)	5 / 16	▲1	12 (18.8%)	12 / 64
Liberal Party	3,436 (8.8%)	▲2.4	1 (6.3%)	1 / 16	▲1	2 (3.1%)	2 / 64
Communist	250 (0.6%)	Steady	0 (0.0%)	0 / 16	Steady	0 (0.0%)	0 / 64

=== Full council ===
↓
50	2	12

=== Aldermen ===
↓
16

=== Councillors ===
↓
34	2	12

== Ward results ==
=== Albert Park ===
Albert Park
Party	Candidate	Votes	%	±%
Labour	D. Bibby	1,536	46.1	+0.6
Liberal	M. Corwin	1,011	30.4	+5.1
Conservative	A. Boardman	782	23.5	−5.7
Majority		525	15.7	−0.6
Turnout		3,329		
Labour hold		Swing		

=== Charlestown ===
Charlestown
Party	Candidate	Votes	%	±%
Labour	C. S. Franks	1,759	50.8	−2.4
Conservative	V. M. Bescoby	1,622	46.8	+5.5
Communist	J. Billington	83	2.4	−3.1
Majority		137	4.0	−7.9
Turnout		3,464		
Labour hold		Swing		

=== Claremont ===
Claremont
Party	Candidate	Votes	%	±%
Conservative	A. E. Clark*	2,738	74.5	+2.3
Labour	M. Flanagan	939	25.5	−2.3
Majority		1,799	49.0	+5.6
Turnout		3,677		
Conservative hold		Swing		

=== Crescent ===
Crescent
Party	Candidate	Votes	%	±%
Labour	R. Wiggins*	697	52.7	−5.6
Conservative	G. H. Ingham	342	25.9	−15.8
Liberal	J. J. Messenger	283	21.4	N/A
Majority		355	26.8	+10.2
Turnout		1,322		
Labour hold		Swing		

=== Docks ===
Docks
Party	Candidate	Votes	%	±%
Labour	M. Stewart	1,115	66.2	+4.7
Conservative	P. Bradley	569	33.8	−4.7
Majority		546	32.4	+9.4
Turnout		1,684		
Labour hold		Swing		

=== Kersal ===
Kersal
Party	Candidate	Votes	%	±%
Liberal	T. S. Rothwell	2,142	48.9	+5.2
Labour	R. Casket*	1,322	30.2	+0.7
Conservative	G. F. Pollard	915	20.9	−5.9
Majority		820	18.7	+4.5
Turnout		4,379		
Liberal gain from Labour		Swing		

=== Langworthy ===
Langworthy
Party	Candidate	Votes	%	±%
Labour	N. Openshaw*	1,244	65.9	+13.7
Conservative	H. Pearson	643	34.1	−13.7
Majority		601	31.8	+27.4
Turnout		1,887		
Labour hold		Swing		

=== Mandley Park ===
Mandley Park
Party	Candidate	Votes	%	±%
Conservative	J. H. Franks*	2,262	56.0	+7.4
Labour	L. Stonehouse	1,779	44.0	−7.4
Majority		483	12.0	
Turnout		4,041		
Conservative hold		Swing		

=== Ordsall Park ===
Ordsall Park
Party	Candidate	Votes	%	±%
Labour	W. Neafsey*	1,296	88.6	+19.8
Communist	J. Cohen	167	11.4	+4.3
Majority		1,129	77.2	+32.5
Turnout		1,463		
Labour hold		Swing		

=== Regent ===
Regent
Party	Candidate	Votes	%	±%
Labour	J. Mackenzie*	1,205	68.8	+3.8
Conservative	A. Burrows	546	31.2	−3.8
Majority		659	37.6	+7.6
Turnout		1,751		
Labour hold		Swing		

=== St. Matthias' ===
St. Matthias'
Party	Candidate	Votes	%	±%
Labour	J. J. Ferris*	956	67.3	+16.2
Conservative	H. Cavanagh	464	32.7	−16.2
Majority		492	34.6	+32.4
Turnout		1,420		
Labour hold		Swing		

=== St. Paul's ===
St. Paul's
Party	Candidate	Votes	%	±%
Labour	P. Grimshaw*	950	57.9	−1.2
Conservative	J. Wood	690	42.1	+1.2
Majority		260	15.8	−2.4
Turnout		1,640		
Labour hold		Swing		

=== St. Thomas' ===
St. Thomas'
Party	Candidate	Votes	%	±%
Labour	J. Goldberg*	679	64.5	+9.6
Conservative	J. Tilby	373	35.5	−9.6
Majority		306	29.0	+19.2
Turnout		1,052		
Labour hold		Swing		

=== Seedley ===
Seedley
Party	Candidate	Votes	%	±%
Conservative	T. H. Mellor*	1,598	54.3	−7.6
Labour	B. Wallsworth	1,343	45.7	+7.6
Majority		255	8.6	−15.2
Turnout		2,941		
Conservative hold		Swing		

=== Trinity ===
Trinity
Party	Candidate	Votes	%	±%
Conservative	D. Sheehan*	868	59.4	+4.2
Labour	J. Davies	593	40.6	−4.2
Majority		275	18.8	+8.4
Turnout		1,461		
Conservative hold		Swing		

=== Weaste ===
Weaste
Party	Candidate	Votes	%	±%
Conservative	R. Mollart	1,866	53.8	−6.4
Labour	G. Warburton*	1,600	46.2	+4.8
Majority		266	7.4	−10.4
Turnout		3,466		
Conservative gain from Labour		Swing		
