= Scottish Protestant League =

- Abbreviation: SPL
- Leader: Alexander Ratcliffe
- Founder: Alexander Ratcliffe
- Founded: 1920
- Dissolved: Early 1940s
- Merged into: Scottish Democratic Fascist Party
- Newspaper: The Vanguard
- Ideology: Right-wing populism Religious conservatism Fascism; Anti-Irish immigration Scottish Home Rule; Anti-Catholicism; Antisemitism (from late 1930s)
- Political position: Far-right
- Religion: Protestantism

The Scottish Protestant League (SPL) was a far-right political party in Scotland during the 1920s and 1930s. It was led by Alexander Ratcliffe, who founded it in 1920.

== Creation and initial years ==
The SPL was launched by Ratcliffe in Edinburgh on 28 September 1920, at a large meeting of representatives from various Protestant Evangelical denominations at the Edinburgh Free Gardeners Institute. The group proclaimed itself to be ‘evangelical, undenominational, and non-political,’ and would oppose ‘spiritualism, Christian Science, and various other systems of anti-Scriptural teaching.’

While the focus was broad, the group was essentially anti-Catholic, being formed days after a Sinn Féin rally in Edinburgh, amidst the backdrop of the early stages of the Irish War of Independence. At the founding meeting the group specifically claimed that responding to the Sinn Féin 'campaign' in Scotland would form a core part of the group's remit.

Ratcliffe served for a short time on the Edinburgh Education Authority. While he accomplished little, his membership brought him additional attention, and by the late 1920s his following had grown, including the Unionist Lord Scone. Frustrated by what he saw as a lack of strong Protestants in the UK parliament, Ratcliffe contested the 1929 United Kingdom general election in Stirling and Falkirk. Ratcliffe chose the seat as the incumbent Labour MP, Hugh Murnin, was Catholic, and the constituency had seen a dispute in Bonnybridge over the creation of a Catholic school. Ratcliffe attacked both Murnin for his Catholicism, and the Unionist candidate Douglas Jamieson on the strength of his Protestantism. Despite this, Ratcliffe offered to Jamieson to withdraw if Jamieson pledged to support amending the Education (Scotland) Act 1918. Jamieson refused, losing the constituency by 5,244 votes to Murnin, with Ratcliffe receiving 6,902 votes. Following the election, Lord Scone broke with Ratcliffe and resigned from the SPL.

== Growth and electoral success ==
In 1930, Ratcliffe moved to Glasgow, and began contesting local elections. Ratcliffe was elected as a councillor to Glasgow Corporation in 1931 for Dennistoun (previously a safe Moderate Party seat) and the League won another seat in Dalmarnock (previously a safe Labour seat) by an ex-communist, Charles Forrester. The third seat it contested failed to unseat the Moderate but it did come second, pushing Labour into third place. In these three seats (which had the highest turn outs in the election) the League gained 12,579 votes (44%).

In 1932 the League stood in eleven wards and gained one more seat (Kinning Park) and 12% of the total vote.

In 1933 the League saw its greatest success when it stood in twenty-three wards and gained over 71,000 votes (23% of the total vote). Again the League did best in seats with the highest turn outs. In the same year Ratcliffe joined the Scottish Fascist Democratic Party for a brief period, but left when the party softened its line on anti-Catholicism. Following a visit to Nazi Germany in 1939, Ratcliffe became a fully fledged convert to fascism.

== Party platform ==
The main policy of the League was to campaign for the repeal of the Education (Scotland) Act 1918 and specifically Section 18 of that Act which allowed Catholic schools into the state system funded through education rates, which led to the slogan: "No Rome on the Rates!" The League wished to stop Irish immigration to Britain, repatriate Irish immigrants already settled and deport Irish immigrants on welfare. The League also opposed cuts in teacher's pay, campaigned for lower wages for top council workers, and was in favour of building more council housing and for reduced rents and rates. Ratcliffe also voiced support for Scottish Home Rule, writing in the party organ Vanguard that "if Home Rule works in Ulster, why cannot it work in Scotland?" Ratcliffe argued that Home Rule would not undermine protestant interests in Scotland, and declared himself willing to support it in principle.

=== Relationship with Ulster Unionists ===
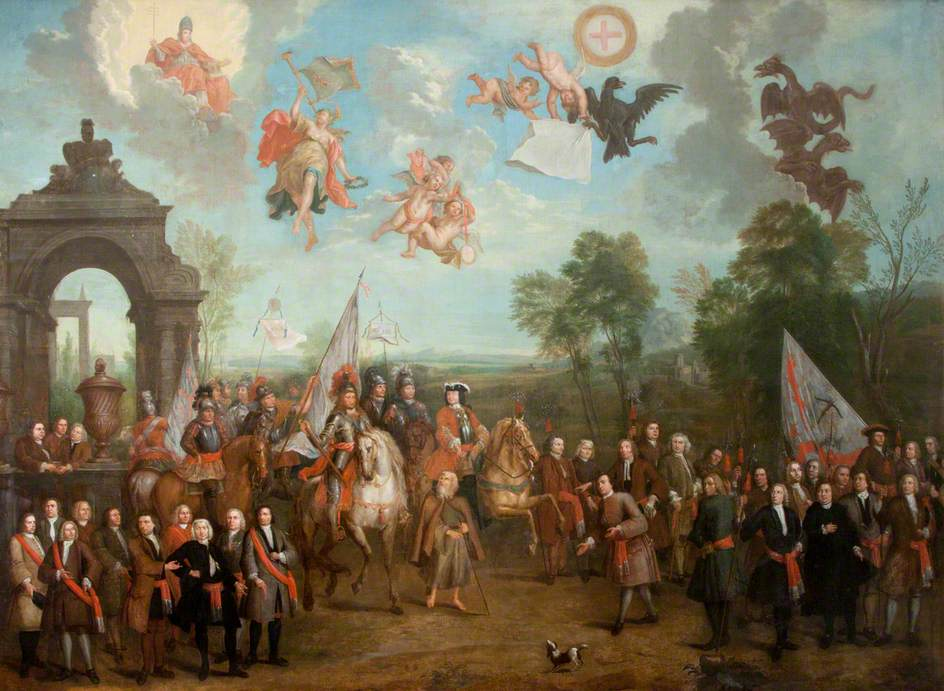
The painting of William III, attacked by SPL members.

The Scottish Protestant League inspired the formation of the Ulster Protestant League in Northern Ireland, after Radcliffe embarked on a speaking tour of Northern Ireland in March and April 1931.

Relations between the SPL and UPL were therefore extremely close to begin with, however they soured after an incident on the afternoon of 2 May 1933, when SPL members Mary Ratcliffe (wife of SPL leader Alexander Ratcliffe) and Charles Forrester attacked and damaged a painting when being given a tour of the Northern Irish Parliament by John William Nixon. The painting depicted Pope Innocent XI celebrating King William's victory at the Battle of the Boyne, which although accurate, was deemed blasphemous by the SPL members (particularly given its location within the Northern Irish parliament). Forrester threw red paint over Innocent XI, whilst Ratcliffe slashed it with a knife. Both were arrested, before being fined £65. The painting had caused discord in the Northern Irish Parliament when first unveiled, due to the realisation that it featured the Pope, with Nixon raising the issue in the Northern Irish Parliament.

== Decline ==
However from 1934 the League declined. Protestant churches opposed it and internal splits hampered it. The majority, including Ratcliffe, voted with Labour on the council, with two voting with the Moderates. After disagreements with Ratcliffe's control of the League, four councillors left and designated themselves independent Protestants. Lord Scone, the League's honorary President, resigned from the group in 1934. In the 1934 election for Glasgow Corporation, the League only put up seven candidates and none were elected (Ratcliffe lost his seat even though there was no Moderate candidate and the independent Protestants lost their seats also), although they did gain a considerable number of votes. In 1937, Ratcliffe failed to be elected for Camphill. Although there are reports that the League was virtually defunct by the late 1930s, its Vanguard newspaper was still running as late as 1939 and reporting that "Hitler and the Pope are a pair...much in common...plotting together with Mussolini, also in the plot, to smash Protestantism throughout Europe", and as late as March 1945 a leaflet advertising Vanguard was being sent to politicians. Its final issue was published in May 1947

Ratcliffe himself remained active during the Second World War; complaints were raised in Parliament in 1943 about an antisemitic pamphlet he had published, though no action was taken against him. Ratcliffe has been described as 'one of the very first Holocaust deniers in the country and perhaps even the world.' He died in Glasgow in 1947.

== See also ==
- Ulster Protestant League
- Protestant Action Society
- Scottish Democratic Fascist Party
