= 1999 North Ayrshire Council election =

North Ayrshire Council election

- 6 May 1999

All 30 seats to North Ayrshire Council 16 seats needed for a majority
- Registered: 106,388
- Turnout: 58.5%
	First party	Second party	Third party
	Lab	SNP	Con
Party	Labour	SNP	Conservative
Last election	26 seats, 55.9%	1 seats, 24.8%	1 seats, 11.8%
Seats won	25	2	2
Seat change	▼1	▲1	▲1
Popular vote	29,211	19,422	11,360
Percentage	46.9%	31.2%	18.2%
Swing	▼9.0	▲6.4	▲6.4
- Results by ward
Council Leader before election
Labour
Council Leader after election
Labour

Elections to North Ayrshire Council were held on 6 May 1999, alongside elections to the Scottish Parliament. on the same day as the other Scottish local government elections. This was the second election to the council following the implementation of the Local Government etc. (Scotland) Act 1994.

The election used the 30 wards created by the Third Statutory Review of Electoral Arrangements in 1998. Each ward elected one councillor using first-past-the-post voting.

Labour retained control of the council by taking 25 of the 30 seats – down by one from the previous election in 1995. The Scottish National Party (SNP) and the Conservatives both won two seats – both up by one – and one independent candidate was elected.

== Background ==
Following the implementation of the Local Government etc. (Scotland) Act 1994, a unitary authority system of local government comprising 32 council areas was introduced the following year. The 1999 elections would be the second elections since their establishment.

At the previous election, Labour took control of the council by winning 26 seats and more than half the popular vote. The Scottish National Party (SNP) and the Conservatives both won one seat and one independent candidate was elected. One seat, Stevenston North, was left vacant as the election was postponed following the death of a candidate.

The Third Statutory Reviews of Electoral Arrangements in North Ayrshire was completed by the Local Government Boundary Commission for Scotland in 1998. As a result, a number of boundary changes came into effect.

The first elections to the re-convened Scottish Parliament were scheduled to take place on the same day.

== Results ==
1999 North Ayrshire Council election result
Party	Seats	Gains	Losses	Net gain/loss	Seats %	Votes %	Votes	+/−
Labour	25	1	2	▼1	83.3	46.9	29,211	▼9.0
SNP	2	1	0	▲1	6.7	31.2	19,422	▲6.4
Conservative	2	1	0	▲1	6.7	18.2	11,360	▲6.4
Independent	1	0	0	Steady	3.3	1.9	1,203	▼1.5
Socialist Labour	0	0	0	Steady	0.0	1.3	787	New
Scottish Socialist	0	0	0	Steady	0.0	0.5	305	New
Total	30						62,288	

== Ward results ==
=== Irvine West ===
Irvine West
Party	Candidate	Votes	%	±%
Labour	David O'Neill	949	42.8	▼17.7
SNP	Catherine McKenzie	790	35.7	▼3.8
Conservative	David Belding	279	12.6	New
Scottish Socialist	Gwen Edwin	108	4.9	New
Socialist Labour	Robert Cochrane	89	4.0	New
Majority		159	7.1	▼13.9
Turnout		2,215	57.0	▲14.5
Registered electors		3,907		
Labour hold		Swing	▼10.7	

=== West Kilbride ===
West Kilbride
Party	Candidate	Votes	%	±%
Independent	Elizabeth McLardy	1,079	41.8	▲5.5
Conservative	Anne Wilkinson	844	32.7	New
Labour	Andrew Naismith	352	13.7	New
SNP	Peter Falconer	301	11.6	New
Majority		235	9.1	▲5.5
Turnout		2,576	69.3	▲11.9
Registered electors		3,726		
Independent hold		Swing	▲5.5	

=== Arran ===
Arran
Party	Candidate	Votes	%	±%
Labour	John Sillars	1,090	42.6	▼7.4
Conservative	Cameron Robertson	747	29.2	▲3.0
SNP	James Lees	719	28.1	▲7.8
Majority		343	13.4	▼10.4
Turnout		2,556	66.3	▲11.4
Registered electors		3,884		
Labour hold		Swing	▼5.2	

== Aftermath ==
The election saw a marked increase in turnout due to the Scottish Parliament elections being held on the same day.

Despite a drop in vote share of nine percentage points, Labour retained control of the council with a net loss of just one seat. The party took 25 of the 30 seats and over 40 per cent of the popular vote. The SNP won just two seats – an increase of one from the previous election – despite taking almost a third of the popular vote. The Conservatives also saw an increase of one seat to hold two and one independent candidate was elected.
