= Protestant Action Society =

Municipal political party in Edinburgh, Scotland

- General Secretary: John Cormack
- Founded: 1933
- Ideology: Religious conservatism Anti-Catholicism; Anti-Irish immigration
- Religion: Protestantism

The Protestant Action Society was a political party in Edinburgh active in the 1930s. It was founded by John Cormack in 1933 and had elected nine members to the Edinburgh Corporation in 1936 with 31 per cent of the vote.

In June 1935 the party organised protests which involved disturbances in Waverley Market and then what has been called "the Morningside Riot" in Canaan Lane when a crowd of around 20,000 Protestant Action supporters stoned and jeered 10,000 attendees at a Eucharistic Congress.

Although often compared to the fascist movements active at the time, the society physically attacked Blackshirt meetings in Edinburgh due to the British Union of Fascists support for a United Ireland. The party emerged at a time when other similar movements were arising in other parts of Scotland, such as the similar Glasgow based Scottish Protestant League, and the Scottish Democratic Fascist Party.

One of the councillors was the Jewish antique dealer Esta Henry who was elected to one of the Canongate wards in 1936.

Cormack tried to encourage the Orange Order in Scotland to join in his movement, but with so little success that he left the movement in 1939 and was not readmitted until the late 1950s.

At its peak the party had 8,000 members.

== See also ==
- Ulster Protestant League
- Scottish Protestant League
- Scottish Democratic Fascist Party
