= 1980 Cunninghame District Council election =

Cunninghame District Council election

- 1 May 1980

All 30 seats to Cunninghame District Council 16 seats needed for a majority
- Registered: 100,521
- Turnout: 49.4%
	First party	Second party	Third party
	Lab	Con	SNP
Party	Labour	Conservative	SNP
Last election	5 seats, 28.0%	5 seats, 24.6%	11 seats, 36.5%
Seats won	21	5	2
Seat change	▲16	Steady	▼9
Popular vote	23,010	10,658	12,802
Percentage	46.4%	21.5%	25.8%
Swing	▲18.4	▼3.1	▼10.7
Council Leader before election
No overall control
Council Leader after election
Labour

Elections to Cunninghame District Council were held on 1 May 1980, on the same day as the other Scottish local government elections. This was the third election to the district council following the local government reforms in 1974.

The election was the first to use the 30 wards created by the Initial Statutory Reviews of Electoral Arrangements in 1979. Each ward elected one councillor using first-past-the-post voting.

Labour regained control of the district council after winning 21 of the 30 seats after increasing their vote share by 18 percentage points. The Conservatives maintained their five council seats and leapfrogged the Scottish National Party (SNP) – who only won two seats – into second place. One independent candidate and one Moderate were elected.

== Background ==
Following the implementation of the Local Government (Scotland) Act 1973, a two-tier system of local government comprising nine regions, 53 districts and three island areas was introduced the following year. The 1980 elections would be the third district elections since their establishment.

Cunninghame had fallen into no overall control following the previous election in 1977. The Scottish National Party (SNP) ended just shy of an overall majority as they won 11 of the 24 seats. The Labour vote had collapsed and the party lost eight seats to end with just five. Despite a decrease in their vote share, the Conservatives made a net gain of one seat to be end as the joint-second largest party with Labour. Two Moderate and one independent candidate were elected.

The Initial Statutory Reviews of Electoral Arrangements in Cunninghame was completed by the Local Government Boundary Commission for Scotland in 1979. As a result, a number of boundary changes came into effect. The number of seats was increased from 24 to 30 so several wards were abolished and replaced by new wards. It had initially been planned that all 53 districts would have their boundaries reviewed in time for the 1980 district elections but it proved too much work for the commission as only 20 reviews – including Cunninghame – were completed in time. The remaining 33 districts would have their boundaries reviewed before the 1984 district elections.

== Results ==
1980 Cunninghame District Council election result
Party	Seats	Gains	Losses	Net gain/loss	Seats %	Votes %	Votes	+/−
Labour	21			▲16	70.0	46.4	23,010	▲18.4
Conservative	5			Steady	20.8	21.5	10,658	▼3.1
SNP	2			▼9	6.7	25.8	12,802	▼10.7
Independent	1			Steady	3.3	3.7	1,855	▲0.8
Moderates	1			▼1	3.3	2.3	1,116	▼2.8
Communist	0			Steady	0.0	0.2	85	New
Liberal	0			Steady	0.0	0.1	62	▼1.1
Total	30						49,588	

== Ward results ==
=== Irvine West ===
Irvine West
Party	Candidate	Votes	%
Labour	D. O'Neill	961	60.6
Independent	J. Caldwell	623	39.3
Majority		338	21.3
Turnout		1,584	54.6
Registered electors		2,903	
Labour win (new seat)			

=== Arran ===
Arran
Party	Candidate	Votes	%
Independent	E. Sillars	1,095	74.8
Labour	W. Wallace	345	23.6
Majority		750	51.2
Turnout		1,440	45.8
Registered electors		3,194	
Independent hold			

== Aftermath ==
Labour regained control of the council as they took more than two-thirds of the seats. Having been seen as unpopular in 1977 while in government at Westminster, the party vote rebounded by 18 percentage points as they increased their representation on the council from five to 21. By contrast, the SNP's popularity had dwindled since the 1977 district elections and, despite coming second on the popular vote, they won only two seats – down by nine – and slipped to the third place. The Conservatives, despite recording a fall in their vote share remained on five seats and as the second-largest party on the council. One independent candidate and one Moderate were also elected.
