= Moderates (Scotland) =

Municipal political organisation

The Moderates were a municipal political organisation operating in Scotland in the early 20th century. The group was based on tacit anti-Labour co-operation between local Unionist Party, Liberal and Independents politicians. The Moderates dominated Glasgow Corporation until the 1933 election, when the rise of the Scottish Protestant League split the Moderate vote and allowed Labour to gain control of the council for the first time.

The Moderates in Glasgow would later become the Progressives in 1936, following the establishment of the Edinburgh Progressive party in 1928. Whilst the terms Progressive and Moderate grew increasingly interchangeable, Even as late as 1969 various Councillors were contesting local elections on a moderate - as opposed to Progressive - platform.

== See also ==
- Progressives
