= Horse Island =

Horse Island is the name of several places, including:

== Canada ==
- Horse Islands (Newfoundland and Labrador)
- Horse Island (Lake Winnipeg), Manitoba

== Ireland ==
- Horse Island, County Clare
- Horse Island, County Cork
- Horse Island, County Kerry

== United Kingdom ==
=== Northern Ireland ===
- Horse Island, County Down, a townland of County Down
- Horse Island, County Fermanagh, a townland of County Fermanagh

=== Scotland ===
- Eilean nan Each (Horse Island), one of the Small Isles off the coast of Skye
- Horse Isle in the Firth of Clyde, North Ayrshire
- Horse Island, Summer Isles in the Summer Isles
- Horse Holm in the Shetland Islands, sometimes shown as Horse Island

== United States ==
- Horse Island (Connecticut)
- Horse Island (Maryland)
- Horse Island (Michigan)
- Horse Island (New Mexico)
- Horse Island (New York), site of the Horse Island Light in Sackets Harbor, New York
- Horse Island (Rockville, South Carolina), listed in the National Register of Historic Places
- Horse Island (Texas)

== See also ==
- Wild Horse Island, Montana
- Hrossey (meaning "horse island"), the old name of Mainland, Orkney, Scotland
- Eilean nan Each (Horse Island), Small Isles, Scotland
- Hestur ("Horse" in Faroese), an island in the Faroe Islands
- Horsey Island (disambiguation)
