= 2022 North Ayrshire Council election =

North Ayrshire Council election

- 5 May 2022

All 33 seats to North Ayrshire Council 17 seats needed for a majority
- Registered: 109,300
- Turnout: 44.7%
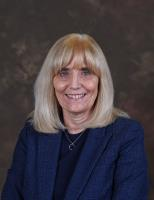

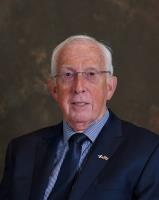

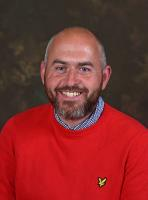
	First party	Second party
Leader	Marie Burns	Tom Marshall
Party	SNP	Conservative
Leader's seat	Irvine East	North Coast
Last election	11 seats, 35.2%	7 seats, 23.5%
Seats before	9	8
Seats won	12	10
Seat change	▲1	▲3
Popular vote	17,052	10,200
Percentage	36.3%	21.7%
Swing	▲1.1%	▼1.8%
	Third party	Fourth party
		Ind
Leader	Joe Cullinane	N/A
Party	Labour	Independent
Leader's seat	Kilwinning	N/A
Last election	11 seats, 26.1%	4 seats, 13.0%
Seats before	10	6
Seats won	9	2
Seat change	▼2	▼2
Popular vote	11,947	5,473
Percentage	25.4%	11.6%
Swing	▼0.7%	▼1.4%
Leader before election
Joe Cullinane
(Labour)
No overall control
Leader after election
Marie Burns
(SNP)
No overall control

Elections to North Ayrshire Council took place on 5 May 2022 on the same day as the 31 other Scottish local government elections. As with other Scottish council elections, it was held using single transferable vote (STV) – a form of proportional representation – in which multiple candidates are elected in each ward and voters rank candidates in order of preference.

For the third consecutive election, the Scottish National Party (SNP) received the highest vote share and returned the most seats at 12 – one more than the previous election. The Conservatives built on their success from five years previous and bucked the national trend as they recorded their best-ever performance in a North Ayrshire election, leapfrogging Labour into second place with 10 seats. Labour fell from their position as the joint-largest party to third, returning only nine councillors – their worst-ever performance in a North Ayrshire election. The number of independents elected fell from four to two.

The SNP subsequently took the leadership of the council, running a minority administration with Cllr Marie Burns elected as council leader.

== Background ==
=== Previous election ===
At the previous election in 2017, the Scottish National Party (SNP) and Labour won the joint-most seats, with 11 each. The SNP's number had reduced by one, while Labour maintained their number of councillors. The Conservatives gained six seats to record their best result in a North Ayrshire election with seven, while the number of independents fell from six to four.

2017 North Ayrshire Council election result
Party	Seats	Vote share
SNP	11	35.2%
Labour	11	26.1%
Conservatives	7	23.5%
Independent	4	13.0%

=== Electoral system ===
Local elections in Scotland use the single transferable vote (STV) electoral system – a form of proportional representation – in which voters rank candidates in order of preference. The 2022 election was the first to use the nine wards created under the Islands (Scotland) Act 2018, with 33 councillors being elected. Each ward – except Arran, which returned one member – elected either three, four or five members.

=== Composition ===
Since the previous election, several changes in the composition of the council occurred. Most were changes to the political affiliation of councillors, including Labour councillor Jimmy Miller who resigned to become an independent and SNP councillor Ellen McMaster who first joined Alba before becoming an independent. One by-election was held after SNP councillor Joy Brahim resigned due to ill health and resulted in a gain for the Conservatives.

Composition of North Ayrshire Council
Party	2017 result	Dissolution
SNP	11	9
Labour	11	10
Conservative	7	8
Independents	4	6

=== Retiring councillors ===
Retiring councillors
Ward	Party	Retiring councillor
Irvine West	Labour	Ian Clarkson
Irvine East	Labour	John Easdale
Irvine South	Conservative	Margaret George
North Coast and Cumbraes	Labour	Alex Gallagher

=== Boundary changes ===
Following the implementation of the Islands (Scotland) Act 2018, a review of the boundaries was undertaken in North Ayrshire, Argyll and Bute, Highland, Orkney Islands, Shetland Islands and the Western Isles. The act allowed for single- or two-member wards to be created to allow for better representation of island communities. The review coincided with the introduction of the Scottish Elections (Reform) Act 2020 which allowed for the creation of five-member wards. As a result, the number of wards in North Ayrshire was reduced from 10 to nine but the number of councillors will remain at 33. No changes were proposed in Kilwinning or the three Irvine wards. The former Ardrossan and Arran ward was split into two wards – a single-member ward for the island of Arran and a three-member ward for Ardrossan. A single ward for Saltcoats and Stevenson was reintroduced after it was split into two separate wards prior to the 2017 election however the area will be represented by five members rather than four as was the case between 2007 and 2017. The former Dalry and West Kilbride, Kilbirnie and Beith, and North Coast and Cumbraes wards were reorganised from two three- and one four-member wards into two five-member wards: North Coast and Garnock Valley.

=== Candidates ===
The total number of candidates increased from 70 in 2017 to 74. As was the case five years previous, the SNP fielded the highest number of candidates at 17 across the nine wards – two less than in 2017. Both Labour and the Conservatives also fielded at least one candidate in every ward but the 14 candidates fielded by Labour was three less than in 2017 whereas the 11 candidates named by the Conservatives was an increase of one. The Greens again contested three wards while the Liberal Democrats contested an election in North Ayrshire for the first time in a decade after they named six candidates. The number of independent candidates fell from 15 in 2017 to 12. Socialist Labour named two candidates, an increase of one, while the Scottish Socialist Party and the Trade Unionist and Socialist Coalition (TUSC) again named one candidate. For the first time, the Scottish Family Party (three candidates), the Independence for Scotland Party (ISP) (two candidates), the Alba Party and the Freedom Alliance (both one candidate) fielded candidates in a North Ayrshire election. Neither the UK Independence Party (UKIP) nor the British Unionist Party (BUP), who had both contested the 2017 election, fielded any candidates.

== Results ==
2022 North Ayrshire Council election result
Party	Seats	Gains	Losses	Net gain/loss	Seats %	Votes %	Votes	+/−
SNP	12	2	1	▲1	36.3	36.2	17,052	▲1.1
Conservative	10	3	0	▲3	30.3	21.7	10,200	▼1.8
Labour	9	1	3	▼2	27.2	25.4	11,947	▼0.7
Independent	2	0	2	▼2	6.0	11.6	5,473	▼1.4
Green	0	0	0	Steady	0.0	1.7	804	▲0.8
Liberal Democrats	0	0	0	Steady	0.0	1.4	671	New
Socialist Labour	0	0	0	Steady	0.0	0.5	268	▲0.4
Scottish Family	0	0	0	Steady	0.0	0.4	192	New
ISP	0	0	0	Steady	0.0	0.3	183	New
Alba	0	0	0	Steady	0.0	0.2	100	New
Scottish Socialist	0	0	0	Steady	0.0	0.0	46	▼0.3
TUSC	0	0	0	Steady	0.0	0.0	40	▼0.1
Freedom Alliance	0	0	0	Steady	0.0	0.0	27	New
Total	33						47,003	

Note: Votes are the sum of first preference votes across all council wards. The net gain/loss and percentage changes relate to the result of the previous Scottish local elections on 4 May 2017. This is because STV has an element of proportionality which is not present unless multiple seats are being elected. This may differ from other published sources showing gain/loss relative to seats held at the dissolution of Scotland's councils.

=== Ward summary ===
Results of the 2022 North Ayrshire Council election by ward
Ward	%	Cllrs	%	Cllrs	%	Cllrs	%	Cllrs	Total Cllrs
Ward	SNP		Lab		Con		Others		Total Cllrs
North Coast	31.0	2	10.1	0	30.1	2	28.8	1	5
Garnock Valley	31.3	2	14.1	1	24.8	1	29.8	1	5
Ardrossan	41.2	1	27.0	1	20.0	1	11.8	0	3
Arran	25.7	0	10.0	0	32.4	1	31.9	0	1
Saltcoats and Stevenson	39.6	2	40.2	2	11.4	1	8.8	0	5
Kilwinning	34.9	1	46.0	2	15.6	1	3.4	0	4
Irvine West	40.7	2	29.8	1	20.0	1	9.6	0	4
Irvine East	44.5	1	27.2	1	19.8	1	8.4	0	3
Irvine South	44.6	1	32.4	1	19.4	1	3.6	0	3
Total	36.3	12	25.4	9	21.7	10	16.6	2	33

=== Seats changing hands ===
Below is a list of seats which elected a different party or parties from 2017 in order to highlight the change in political composition of the council from the previous election. The list does not include defeated incumbents who resigned or defected from their party and subsequently failed re-election while the party held the seat. Due to boundary changes, some wards may differ between the 2017 and 2022 elections.

Seats changing hands
2017			2022		
Seat	Party	Member	Seat	Party	Member
Dalry and West Kilbride	Independent	Robert Barr	Garnock Valley	Conservative	Ronnie Stalker
North Coast and Cumbraes	Labour	Alex Gallagher	North Coast	SNP	Eleanor Collier
New ward			Arran	Conservative	Timothy Billings
Stevenston	Labour	Jimmy Miller	Saltcoats and Stevenston	Conservative	Cameron Inglis
Saltcoats	Independent	Ronnie McNicol	Saltcoats and Stevenston	Conservative	Cameron Inglis
Irvine West	Labour	Ian Clarkson	Irvine West	SNP	Chloe Robertson

Notes

1. Note 1: The Dalry and West Kilbride, Kilbirnie and Beith and North Coast and Cumbraes wards used in the 2017 election were replaced by the new Garnock Valley and North Coast wards.
2. Note 2: In 2017, Jimmy Miller was elected as a Labour candidate but later resigned from the party.
3. Note 3: The total number of councillors representing Saltcoats and Stevenston was reduced from six to five following the boundary changes.

== Ward results ==
At the previous election, the North Coast and Garnock Valley wards were previously represented by three wards: Dalry and West Kilbride, Kilbirnie and Beith and North Coast and Cumbraes. The three wards elected 10 councillors in total, including three SNP, three independents, two Labour and two Conservatives. The newly created wards elected four SNP, three Conservatives, two independents and one Labour, resulting in a gain for the SNP and the Conservatives and a loss each for Labour and independent candidate Robert Barr.

=== North Coast ===
North Coast - 5 seats
Party	Candidate	FPv%	Count											
Party	Candidate	FPv%	1	2	3	4	5	6	7	8	9	10	11	12
SNP	Eleanor Collier	17.5	1,724											
Independent	Ian Murdoch (Note: Sitting councillor for North Coast and Cumbraes.)	17.4	1,718											
Conservative	Todd Ferguson (Note: Sitting councillor for Dalry and West Kilbride.)	16.5	1,633	1,633	1,641									
Conservative	Tom Marshall	13.5	1,331	1,331	1,341	1,341	1,346	1,349	1,352	1,379	1,412	1,439	1,442	1,677
SNP	Alan Hill	13.4	1,325	1,393	1,405	1,405	1,420	1,461	1,474	1,485	1,545	1,756		
Labour	Valerie Reid	10.1	995	996	1,004	1,004	1,010	1,014	1,066	1,128	1,175	1,298	1,325	
Green	David John Nairn	3.9	392	397	404	404	417	427	440	478	527			
Independent	Wendy Low-Thomson	2.3	234	234	249	249	267	291	299	326				
Liberal Democrats	Margaret McLellan	2.0	203	203	206	206	208	210	219					
Socialist Labour	James McDaid	1.1	118	118	119	119	120	125						
Alba	Jane Fraser	1.0	100	101	101	101	105							
ISP	Nick Hobson	0.7	72	72	74	74								
Electorate: 18,557 Valid: 9,845 Spoilt: 160 Quota: 1,641 Turnout: 53.9%

=== Garnock Valley ===
Garnock Valley - 5 seats
Party	Candidate	FPv%	Count										
Party	Candidate	FPv%	1	2	3	4	5	6	7	8	9	10	11
Independent	Donald L. Reid (Note: Sitting councillor for Kilbirnie and Beith.)	22.8	1,613										
Conservative	Ronnie Stalker	20.1	1,420										
SNP	Anthea Dickson	19.3	1,362										
SNP	Margaret Johnson	11.9	844	923	935	1,098	1,100	1,103	1,108	1,128	1,141	1,141	1,279
Labour	John Bell	11.4	806	892	910	919	923	924	937	1,095	1,181		
Independent	Robert Barr	5.5	388	464	539	542	550	568	583	597	700	701	
Conservative	Ted Nevill	4.6	327	374	456	457	460	463	472	480			
Labour	James Robson	2.6	190	219	225	226	226	228	235				
Liberal Democrats	Catherine Williamson	0.7	55	63	66	67	70	72					
Freedom Alliance (UK)	Carol Ann Dobson	0.3	27	31	32	34							
Independent	John Willis	0.1	12	34	36	36	38						
Electorate: 16,364 Valid: 7,044 Spoilt: 167 Quota: 1,175 Turnout: 44.1%

=== Ardrossan ===
At the previous election, Ardrossan was included in a ward representing Ardrossan and Arran which returned one SNP, one Labour and one Conservative councillor. The new ward returned the same political mix despite the boundary changes.

Ardrossan - 3 seats
Party	Candidate	FPv%	Count						
Party	Candidate	FPv%	1	2	3	4	5	6	7
SNP	Tony Gurney (Note: Sitting councillor for Ardrossan and Arran.)	30.9	1,107						
Labour	Amanda Kerr	27.0	966						
Conservative	Stewart Ferguson	19.9	714	717	729	739	751	858	1,013
SNP	Jim McHarg	10.2	366	549	558	565	574	674	
Independent	John Hunter	9.3	333	345	359	366	390		
Scottish Family	Matthew Lynch	1.3	47	47	51				
Liberal Democrats	Stephen McQuistin	1.2	44	45	56	62			
Electorate: 8,512 Valid: 3,577 Spoilt: 70 Quota: 895 Turnout: 42.8%

=== Arran ===
At the previous election, Arran was included in a ward representing Ardrossan and Arran. The newly re-established Arran ward resulted in a Conservative win.

Arran - 1 seat
Party	Candidate	FPv%	Count					
Party	Candidate	FPv%	1	2	3	4	5	6
Conservative	Timothy Billings	32.4	788	820	872	891	1,038	1,335
SNP	Steve Garraway	25.7	625	662	689	825	951	
Independent	Tom Young	12.5	305	375	436	519		
Labour	Aaran McDonald	9.9	243	260				
Green	Ronna Park	9.9	241	272	321			
Independent	Ellen McMaster	9.4	229					
Electorate: 4,072 Valid: 2,431 Spoilt: 23 Quota: 1,216 Turnout: 60.3%

=== Saltcoats and Stevenston ===
At the previous election, Saltcoats and Stevenston was represented by two separate wards, one for Saltcoats and one for Stevenston. In total, they elected six councillors including three Labour, two SNP and an independent. The newly re-established ward which had been used between 2007 and 2017 elected two SNP, two Labour and one Conservative councillor resulting in a Conservative gain and a loss for Labour and independent candidate Ronnie McNicol. Independent candidate Jimmy Miller was elected as a Labour candidate in 2017 but later resigned from the party.

Saltcoats and Stevenston - 5 seats
Party	Candidate	FPv%	Count							
Party	Candidate	FPv%	1	2	3	4	5	6	7	8
SNP	Jean McClung (Note: Sitting councillor for Saltcoats.)	29.3	1,908							
Labour	Jim Montgomerie	28.0	1,822							
Labour	John Sweeney (Note: Sitting councillor for Stevenston.)	12.2	796	811	1,350					
Conservative	Cameron Inglis	11.4	742	745	772	776	814	828	857	1,103
SNP	Davina McTeirnan	10.2	666	1,402						
Independent	Ronnie McNicol	5.6	366	394	448	486	527	605	702	
ISP	David Higgins	1.7	111	120	127	206	219	235		
Independent	Jimmy Miller	1.4	95	97	119	140	182			
Electorate: 16,951 Valid: 6,506 Spoilt: 202 Quota: 1,085 Turnout: 39.6%

=== Kilwinning ===
Labour (2), the SNP (1) and the Conservatives (1) retained the seats they won at the previous election.

Kilwinning - 4 seats
Party	Candidate	FPv%	Count					
Party	Candidate	FPv%	1	2	3	4	5	6
Labour	Joe Cullinane (incumbent)	30.8	1,714					
SNP	Scott Davidson (incumbent)	22.0	1,225					
Conservative	John Glover (incumbent)	15.6	867	904	936	937	1,029	1,295
Labour	Donald Reid (incumbent)	15.1	842	1,297				
SNP	Sheila Gibson	12.8	714	750	780	886	944	
Liberal Democrats	Ruby Kirkwood	3.4	191	226	276	278		
Electorate: 13,553 Valid: 5,553 Spoilt: 171 Quota: 1,111 Turnout: 42.2%

=== Irvine West ===
The SNP retained the seat they had won at the previous election and gained one from Labour, while the Conservatives retained their only seat and Labour retained one of their two seats.

Irvine West - 4 seats
Party	Candidate	FPv%	Count									
Party	Candidate	FPv%	1	2	3	4	5	6	7	8	9	10
SNP	Shaun MacAulay (incumbent)	27.3	1,274									
Conservative	Scott Gallacher (incumbent)	19.9	932	934								
Labour	Louise McPhater (incumbent)	15.6	729	738	738	746	748	757	792	814	816	1,472
Labour	Sylvia Mallinson	14.1	660	674	674	676	678	697	758	788	790	
SNP	Chloe Robertson	13.3	623	894	894	905	906	909	922	948		
Socialist Labour	Bobby Cochrane	3.2	150	155	155	168	172	181				
Independent	Kevin T. Blades	2.8	133	136	136	139	165	184	212			
Liberal Democrats	Lewis Dominic Hutton	1.5	72	75	75	76	81					
Independent	Tristan Lindsay	1.0	47	49	49	53						
Scottish Socialist	Colin Turbett	0.9	46	47	47							
Electorate: 12,090 Valid: 4,666 Spoilt: 142 Quota: 934 Turnout: 39.8%

=== Irvine East ===
The SNP, Labour and the Conservatives retained the seats they had won at the previous election.

Irvine East - 3 seats
Party	Candidate	FPv%	Count						
Party	Candidate	FPv%	1	2	3	4	5	6	7
SNP	Marie Burns (incumbent)	36.5	1,470						
Labour	Nairn McDonald	27.2	1,096						
Conservative	Angela Stephen (incumbent)	19.7	795	797	818	839	885	913	1,097
SNP	Susan Johnson	8.0	323	696	706	718	730	874	
Green	Ross Colins	4.2	171	219	227	239	278		
Liberal Democrats	Barry Keith Jackson	2.6	106	111	130	139			
Scottish Family	Karin Craig	1.5	64	70	76				
Electorate: 10,204 Valid: 4,025 Spoilt: 87 Quota: 1,007 Turnout: 40.3%

=== Irvine South ===
The SNP, Labour and the Conservatives retained the seats they had won at the previous election.

Irvine South - 3 seats
Party	Candidate	FPv%	Count						
Party	Candidate	FPv%	1	2	3	4	5	6	7
SNP	Christina Larsen (incumbent)	25.9	871						
Labour	Robert Foster (incumbent)	22.6	761	761	765	783	1,048		
Conservative	Matthew McLean	19.3	651	651	656	681	711	759	889
SNP	Joseph Hopkins	18.6	625	652	660	669	691	728	
Labour	David O'Neill	9.7	327	327	336	355			
Scottish Family	Robert John Craig	2.4	81	81	87				
TUSC	Ian Kerr	1.1	40	40					
Electorate: 8,997 Valid: 3,356 Spoilt: 96 Quota: 840 Turnout: 38.4%

== Aftermath ==
The SNP recorded one of their best results in North Ayrshire, and group leader Cllr Marie Burns said after the election that she was "so pleased and so grateful to the people of North Ayrshire for putting their trust in us". Despite losing support and placing third in the popular vote, the Conservatives recorded their best-ever result in a North Ayrshire election by becoming the second-largest party on the council. Conservative group leader Cllr Tom Marshall said the result was "a great achievement" as the party bucked the national trend which saw the Conservatives lose seats. In contrast, Labour recorded their worst election performance in North Ayrshire as they slipped to third with nine seats. Outgoing council leader and Labour group leader Cllr Joe Cullinane said that he did not believe the result was a "reflection of the campaign we ran nor the work we did in administration" and that he was "really gutted".

After winning the largest number of seats, the SNP formed a minority administration to take control of the council for the first time since 2016. Cllr Marie Burns was elected council leader and Cllr Shaun MacAuley was elected as depute leader. Cllr Anthea Dickson was elected as Provost and Labour councillor John Sweeney was elected as Depute Provost.

In February 2024, Cllr Marshall was cleared off any wrongdoing by the Standards Commission for Scotland following a visit he had made to the site of a planning application in Irvine while he was chair of the council's planning committee. Later in the year, he stood down as leader of the Conservative group at the group's AGM and was replaced by his deputy, Cllr Cameron Inglis. Cllr Matthew McLean was installed as deputy leader at the meeting which took place in June 2024.

Cllr McLean and his Conservative colleague Cllr Stewart Ferguson defected from the party to join Reform UK in November 2024 - a move which was called "disappointing" by Cllr Inglis, Conservative group leader. Cllr McLean was later replaced as Conservative deputy leader in January 2025 by Cllr Scott Gallacher.

Conservative councillor Todd Ferguson resigned from the party in July 2025 over what he described as a "cowardly smear campaign" against Central Scotland MSP Meghan Gallacher. He later defected to Reform UK.

In January 2026, Cllr Burns and Cllr MacAuley stood down as leader and deputy leader respectively. They were replaced in the roles by Cllr Tony Gurney and Cllr Christina Larsen.

=== Kilwinning by-election ===
In February 2024, Conservative Kilwinning councillor John Glover died following a period of ill health which had prevented him from attending meetings for nine months. A by-election was held on 9 May 2024 and was won by Labour's Mary Hume.

Kilwinning by-election (9 May 2024) - 1 seat
Party	Candidate	FPv%	Count
Party	Candidate	FPv%	1
Labour	Mary Hume	53.8	2,171
SNP	Sheila Gibson	22.7	916
Conservative	Chris Lawler	15.3	619
Liberal Democrats	Ruby Kirkwood	3.8	154
Scottish Family	Ian Gibson	3.3	136
Electorate: 13,392 Valid: 3,996 Spoilt: 42 Quota: 1,999 Turnout: 30.2%

=== Arran by-election ===
In June 2024, Arran councillor Timothy Billings announced his intention to step down as a councillor after moving back to England before formally stepping down in August 2024. The SNP did not contest the by-election after their intended candidate withdrew for personal reasons at short notice. The by-election was held on 12 September 2024 and was won by Labour candidate Charles Currie.

Arran by-election (12 September 2024) - 1 seat
Party	Candidate	FPv%	Count				
Party	Candidate	FPv%	1	2	3	4	5
Labour	Charles Currie	45.4	748	751	754	778	910
Independent	James Andrew McMaster	24.4	402	405	416	442	543
Green	Neil Alexander Wilkonson	20.6	340	342	343	354	
Conservative	Mackenzie Smith	5.5	90	92	112		
Reform	Carole Thomson	3.3	55	55			
Liberal Democrats	Matt Taylor	0.7	12				
Electorate: 4,034 Valid: 1,647 Spoilt: 21 Quota: 824 Turnout: 41.3%
