= Ardrossan (ward) =

Electoral ward in North Ayrshire

- North Ayrshire
- Population: 10,359 (2021)
- Electorate: 8,512 (2022)
- Major settlements: Ardrossan
- Scottish Parliament constituency: Cunninghame North
- Scottish Parliament region: West Scotland
- UK Parliament constituency: North Ayrshire and Arran

Current ward
- Created: 2022
- Number of councillors: 3
- Councillor: Tony Gurney (SNP)
- Councillor: Amanda Kerr (Labour)
- Councillor: Stewart Ferguson (Conservative)
- Created from: Ardrossan and Arran; Dalry and West Kilbride; Saltcoats

Ardrossan is one of the nine electoral wards of North Ayrshire Council. Created in 2022, the ward elects three councillors using the single transferable vote electoral system and covers an area with a population of 10,359 people.

== Boundaries ==
The ward was created following the 2019 Reviews of Electoral Arrangements which were instigated following the implementation of the Islands (Scotland) Act 2018. Ardrossan was formed from three previous wards, taking in the mainland area from the former Ardrossan and Arran ward – the Isle of Arran being given its own ward – as well as an area of Ardrossan which was part of the former Saltcoats ward and a rural area from the former Dalry and West Kilbride ward. The ward centres around the town of Ardrossan taking in an area in the west of mainland North Ayrshire on the Firth of Clyde and includes the uninhabited Horse Isle.

== Councillors ==
Election	Councillors		
2022	Tony Gurney (SNP)	Stewart Ferguson (Conservative)	Amanda Kerr (Labour)

== Election results ==
=== 2022 election ===
Ardrossan - 3 seats
Party	Candidate	FPv%	Count						
Party	Candidate	FPv%	1	2	3	4	5	6	7
SNP	Tony Gurney (Note: Sitting councillor for Ardrossan and Arran.)	30.9	1,107						
Labour	Amanda Kerr	27.0	966						
Conservative	Stewart Ferguson	19.9	714	717	729	739	751	858	1,013
SNP	Jim McHarg	10.2	366	549	558	565	574	674	
Independent	John Hunter	9.3	333	345	359	366	390		
Scottish Family	Matthew Lynch	1.3	47	47	51				
Liberal Democrats	Stephen McQuistin	1.2	44	45	56	62			
Electorate: 8,512 Valid: 3,577 Spoilt: 70 Quota: 895 Turnout: 42.8%
