= Saltcoats East (ward) =

Former electoral ward in North Ayrshire

- North Ayrshire
- Electorate: 3,315 (2003)
- Major settlements: Saltcoats
- Scottish Parliament constituency: Cunninghame North
- Scottish Parliament region: West Scotland
- UK Parliament constituency: North Ayrshire and Arran

1974–2007
- Number of councillors: 1
- Replaced by: Saltcoats and Stevenston

Saltcoats East was created as an electoral ward in Cunninghame District Council in 1974. The ward elected one councillors using the first past the post electoral system. the ward was abolished in 2007 following the Fourth Statutory Reviews of Electoral Arrangements.

The ward was a Labour stronghold within Cunninghame District and North Ayrshire Council.

== Councillors ==
Year	Councillor
1974	George Barnett (Labour)
1977	George Barnett (Labour)
1980	Michael McGuire (Labour)
1984	Michael McGuire (Labour)
1988	Michael McGuire (Labour)
1992	David Munn (Labour)
1995	David Munn (Labour)
1999	David Munn (Labour)
2003	David Munn (Labour)

== Election results ==
=== 1977 election ===
Saltcoats East
Party	Candidate	Votes	%
Labour	George Barnett	649	39.2
SNP	A. Arnott	577	34.9
Independent	J. McCann	290	17.6
Liberal	J. MacIntosh	67	4.1
Majority		72	
Turnout			49.3
Registered electors		3,367	
Labour hold			

=== 1974 election ===
Saltcoats East
Party	Candidate	Votes	%
Labour	George Barnett	1,089	65.9
Conservative	Margaret McGregor	564	34.1
Majority		525	
Turnout		1,653	48.2
Registered electors		3,478	
Labour win (new seat)			
