= Ardrossan and Arran (ward) =

Former electoral ward in North Ayrshire

- North Ayrshire
- Boundary of Ardrossan and Arran in North Ayrshire from 2017–2022.
- Electorate: 9,622 (2017)
- Major settlements: Ardrossan; Brodick
- Scottish Parliament constituency: Cunninghame North
- Scottish Parliament region: West Scotland
- UK Parliament constituency: North Ayrshire and Arran

2007–2022
- Number of councillors: 3
- Replaced by: Ardrossan; Arran
- Created from: Ardrossan North; Ardrossan South; Arran; Saltcoats North; South Beach

Ardrossan and Arran was one of the 10 wards used to elect members of North Ayrshire Council. Created in 2007 following the Fourth Statutory Reviews of Electoral Arrangements, the ward elected three councillors using the single transferable vote electoral system. Originally a four-member ward, Ardrossan and Arran was reduced in size following a boundary review ahead of the 2017 election. As a result of the Islands (Scotland) Act 2018, the ward was abolished in 2022.

The ward was a Scottish National Party (SNP) stronghold with the party holding at least half the seats between 2012 and 2021.

== Boundaries ==
The ward was created following the Fourth Statutory Reviews of Electoral Arrangements ahead of the 2007 Scottish local elections. As a result of the Local Governance (Scotland) Act 2004, local elections in Scotland would use the single transferable vote electoral system from 2007 onwards so Ardrossan was formed from an amalgamation of several previous first-past-the-post wards. It contained part of the former Ardrossan North, Saltcoats North and South Beach wards as well as all of the former Ardrossan South and Arran wards. The ward centred around the town of Ardrossan and the Isle of Arran and included a number of smaller islands in the Firth of Clyde including the Holy Isle and the uninhabited Pladda and Horse Isle. Following the Fifth Statutory Reviews of Electoral Arrangements ahead of the 2017 Scottish local elections, the ward was reduced in size from a four-member ward to a three-member ward as an area in the northeast of Ardrossan was transferred to the newly created Saltcoats ward.

In 2018, the Scottish Parliament passed the Islands (Scotland) Act 2018 which included provisions to improve the representation of island communities on councils. As a result, an intermediate review of the boundaries in North Ayrshire was carried out. This proposed that Ardrossan and Arran be split in two with a single-member Arran ward re-established and a slightly enlarged three-member Ardrossan ward created. The proposals for North Ayrshire were subsequently approved by the Scottish Parliament and the ward was abolished in 2022.

== Councillors ==
Year	Councillors			
2007	Tony Gurney (SNP)	Peter McNamara (Labour)	Margie Currie (Ind.)	John Hunter (Ind.)
2012	Tony Gurney (SNP)	Peter McNamara (Labour)	John Bruce (SNP)	John Hunter (Ind.)
2017	Tony Gurney (SNP)	Timothy Billings (Conservative)	Ellen McMaster (SNP/ Alba/ Ind.)	
2021	Tony Gurney (SNP)	Timothy Billings (Conservative)	Ellen McMaster (SNP/ Alba/ Ind.)	
2022	Tony Gurney (SNP)	Timothy Billings (Conservative)	Ellen McMaster (SNP/ Alba/ Ind.)	

== Election results ==
=== 2017 election ===
Ardrossan and Arran - 3 seats
Party	Candidate	FPv%	Count					
Party	Candidate	FPv%	1	2	3	4	5	6
Conservative	Timothy Billings	27.6	1,309					
SNP	Ellen McMaster (Note: Cllr Ellen McMaster twice changed political affiliation first joining the Alba Party before becoming an independent.)	19.7	932	937	1,000	1,002	1,034	1,159
SNP	Tony Gurney (incumbent)	19.6	930	932	946	955	1,092	1,245
Labour	Clare McGuire	13.9	659	677	723	792	979	
Independent	John Hunter (incumbent)	10.6	503	517	534	627		
No Referendum Maintain Union Pro-Brexit	Gordon Allison	5.0	238	280	285			
Scottish Socialist	Colin Turbett	3.5	165	170				
Electorate: 9,622 Valid: 4,736 Spoilt: 123 Quota: 1,185 Turnout: 50.5%

=== 2012 election ===
Ardrossan and Arran - 4 seats
Party	Candidate	FPv%	Count							
Party	Candidate	FPv%	1	2	3	4	5	6	7	8
SNP	Tony Gurney (incumbent)	17.6	982	986	998	1,033	1,048	1,081	1,095	1,149
SNP	John Bruce	15.0	837	841	868	889	918	1,109	1,113	1,157
Independent	John Hunter (incumbent)	14.2	792	796	833	895	1,025	1,191		
Labour	Peter McNamara (incumbent)	12.9	721	730	738	770	812	871	881	1,414
Labour	Loretta Gardner	11.8	659	667	692	720	750	793	798	
Independent	Marc A. Head	10.5	588	595	609	620	714			
Conservative	David Tate	8.8	491	507	551	561				
Scottish Socialist	Campbell Martin	4.2	235	237	250					
UKIP	Gordon Niven Allison	3.9	221	227						
Liberal Democrats	Nick Smith	1.1	64							
Electorate: 13,674 Valid: 5,590 Spoilt: 106 Quota: 1,119 Turnout: 40.9%

=== 2007 election ===
Ardrossan and Arran - 4 seats
Party	Candidate	FPv%	Count								
Party	Candidate	FPv%	1	2	3	4	5	6	7	8	9
Independent	Margie Currie	19.3	1,439	1,456	1,478	1,582					
SNP	Tony Gurney	19.0	1,414	1,439	1,462	1,779					
Labour	Peter McNamara	13.5	1,007	1,019	1,033	1,051	1,085	1,094	1,763		
Independent	John Hunter	12.8	952	970	1,087	1,106	1,176	1,189	1,234	1,287	1,658
Conservative	Gordon Allison	11.5	857	866	872	886	914	930	963	989	
Labour	Margaret Munn	11.1	829	837	848	864	884	888			
SNP	William McLaren	7.7	573	589	597						
Independent	Kenneth MacDougall	3.1	228	237							
Scottish Socialist	Nigel Hunter	1.9	144								
Electorate: 13,448 Valid: 7,443 Spoilt: 146 Quota: 1,489 Turnout: 56.4%
