= North Coast and Cumbraes (ward) =

Former electoral ward in North Ayrshire

- North Ayrshire
- Boundary of North Coast and Cumbraes in North Ayrshire from 2017–2022.
- Electorate: 13,596 (2017)
- Major settlements: Largs; Millport
- Scottish Parliament constituency: Cunninghame North
- Scottish Parliament region: West Scotland
- UK Parliament constituency: North Ayrshire and Arran

2007–2022
- Number of councillors: 4
- Replaced by: North Coast
- Created from: Kilbirnie North; Largs East; Largs North and Skelmorlie; Largs South and Fairlie; Largs West and Cumbrae

North Coast and Cumbraes was one of the nine wards used to elect members of North Ayrshire Council. Created in 2007 following the Fourth Statutory Reviews of Electoral Arrangements, the ward elected four councillors using the single transferable vote electoral system. As a result of the Islands (Scotland) Act 2018, the ward was abolished in 2022.

The ward was a Scottish National Party (SNP) stronghold as the part held half the seats between 2007 and 2017. Both Labour and the Conservatives also returned one councillor at each election.

== Boundaries ==
The ward was created following the Fourth Statutory Reviews of Electoral Arrangements ahead of the 2007 Scottish local elections. As a result of the Local Governance (Scotland) Act 2004, local elections in Scotland would use the single transferable vote electoral system from 2007 onwards so North Coast and Cumbraes was formed from an amalgamation of several previous first-past-the-post wards. It contained the northern part of former Largs South and Fairlie ward and the western part of the former Kilbirnie North ward as well as all of the former Largs East, Largs North and Skelmorlie and Largs West and Cumbrae wards. North Coast and Cumbraes took in the northernmost part of the council area next to its border with Inverclyde, Renfrewshire and the Firth of Clyde and included the towns of Largs, Fairlie and Skelmorlie as well as the two islands of The Cumbraes.

North Coast and Cumbraes was the only ward in the council area unaffected following the Fifth Statutory Reviews of Electoral Arrangements ahead of the 2017 Scottish local elections.

In 2018, the Scottish Parliament passed the Islands (Scotland) Act 2018 which included provisions to improve the representation of island communities on councils. As a result, an intermediate review of the boundaries in North Ayrshire was carried out. The review coincided with the introduction of the Scottish Elections (Reform) Act 2020 which allowed for the creation of five-member wards. This proposed that three wards – Dalry and West Kilbride, Kilbirnie and Beith and North Coast and Cumbraes – be replaced by two new wards named Garnock Valley and North Coast. The proposals for North Ayrshire were subsequently approved by the Scottish Parliament and the ward was abolished in 2022.

== Councillors ==
Election	Councillors			
2007	Alan Hill (SNP)	Bobby Rae (SNP)	Alex Gallagher (Labour)	Elisabethe Marshall (Conservative)
2012	Alan Hill (SNP)	Alex McLean (SNP)	Alex Gallagher (Labour)	Tom Marshall (Conservative)
2014	Alan Hill (SNP)	Grace McLean (SNP)	Alex Gallagher (Labour)	Tom Marshall (Conservative)
2017	Alan Hill (SNP)	Ian Murdoch (Ind.)	Alex Gallagher (Labour)	Tom Marshall (Conservative)

== Election results ==
=== 2017 election ===
North Coast and Cumbraes - 4 seats
Party	Candidate	FPv%	Count					
Party	Candidate	FPv%	1	2	3	4	5	6
Conservative	Tom Marshall (incumbent)	37.0	2,686					
SNP	Alan Hill (incumbent)	19.4	1,406	1,450	1,451			
Labour	Alex Gallagher (incumbent)	16.0	1,160	1,461				
SNP	Grace McLean (incumbent)	14.8	1,075	1,091	1,091	1,092	1,112	
Independent	Ian Murdoch	11.0	801	1,110	1,113	1,113	1,272	1,767
Independent	Johnny McCloskey	1.7	124	239	241	241		
Electorate: 13,596 Valid: 7,252 Spoilt: 117 Quota: 1,451 Turnout: 54.2%

=== 2014 by-election ===
SNP councillor Alex McLean died on 1 August 2014. A by-election was held on 30 October 2014 and was won by his widow Grace McLean, also of the SNP.

North Coast and Cumbraes by-election (30 October 2014) - 1 seat
Party	Candidate	FPv%	Count				
Party	Candidate	FPv%	1	2	3	4	5
SNP	Grace McLean	38.7	2,021	2,045	2,156	2,279	2,966
Independent	Drew Cochrane	22.8	1,190	1,234	1,411	2,000	
Conservative	Toni Dawson	21.5	1,125	1,174	1,296		
Labour	Valerie Reid	13.2	691	711			
UKIP	Meilan Henderson	3.6	192				
Electorate: 14,052 Valid: 5,219 Spoilt: 45 Quota: 2,610 Turnout: 37.5%

=== 2012 election ===
North Coast and Cumbraes - 4 seats
Party	Candidate	FPv%	Count					
Party	Candidate	FPv%	1	2	3	4	5	6
SNP	Alan Hill (incumbent)	27.4	1,705					
Labour	Alex Gallagher (incumbent)	18.4	1,144	1,167	1,197	1,281		
Conservative	Tom Marshall	18.4	1,143	1,161	1,173	1,176	1,182	1,599
SNP	Alex McLean (Note: North Coast and Cumbraes SNP councillor Alex McLean died on 1 August 2014. A by-election was held on 30 October 2014 and was won by his widow Grace McLean, also of the SNP.)	17.5	1,090	1,441				
Independent	Ian Murdoch	16.3	1,017	1,050	1,103	1,126	1,137	
Socialist Labour	James Anderson	2.0	124	128	137			
Electorate: 13,226 Valid: 6,223 Spoilt: 97 Quota: 1,245 Turnout: 47.0%

=== 2007 election ===
North Coast and Cumbraes - 4 seats
Party	Candidate	FPv%	Count							
Party	Candidate	FPv%	1	2	3	4	5	6	7	8
SNP	Alan Hill	30.2	2,357							
Labour	Alex Gallagher	19.8	1,549	1,608						
Conservative	Elisabethe Marshall	12.9	1,007	1,037	1,040	1,084	1,179	1,779		
Conservative	Tom Marshall	9.2	719	732	734	751	785			
SNP	Bobby Rae	9.2	715	1,194	1,201	1,259	1,389	1,429	1,457	1,832
Independent	Ian Murdoch	7.5	587	622	626	793	936	980	1,038	
Liberal Democrats	Lewis Hutton	6.3	493	548	559	617				
Independent	Gerard Langan	4.8	377	411	414					
Electorate: 13,519 Valid: 7,804 Spoilt: 174 Quota: 1,561 Turnout: 59.0%
