= North Coast (North Ayrshire ward) =

Electoral ward in North Ayrshire

- North Ayrshire
- Population: 21,188 (2021)
- Electorate: 18,557 (2022)
- Major settlements: Largs; Millport; West Kilbride
- Scottish Parliament constituency: Cunninghame North
- Scottish Parliament region: West Scotland
- UK Parliament constituency: North Ayrshire and Arran

Current ward
- Created: 2022
- Number of councillors: 5
- Councillor: Eleanor Collier (SNP)
- Councillor: Ian Murdoch (Independent)
- Councillor: Todd Ferguson (Reform)
- Councillor: Alan Hill (SNP)
- Councillor: Tom Marshall (Conservative)
- Created from: North Coast and Cumbraes; Dalry and West Kilbride

North Coast is one of the nine electoral wards of North Ayrshire Council. Created in 2022, the ward elects five councillors using the single transferable vote electoral system and covers an area with a population of 20,423 people.

== Boundaries ==
The ward was created following the 2019 Reviews of Electoral Arrangements which were instigated following the implementation of the Islands (Scotland) Act 2018. The review coincided with the introduction of the Scottish Elections (Reform) Act 2020 which allowed for the creation of five-member wards. North Coast was formed from two previous wards, taking in all of the former North Coast and Cumbraes ward and the western half of the former Dalry and West Kilbride ward. The ward covers the northernmost part of the council area next to its borders with Inverclyde, Renfrewshire and the Firth of Clyde and takes in the towns of Fairlie, Largs, Skelmorlie and West Kilbride as well as the two islands of The Cumbraes.

== Councillors ==
Election	Councillors				
2022	Eleanor Collier (SNP)	Alan Hill (SNP)	Todd Ferguson (Conservative)	Tom Marshall (Conservative)	Ian Murdoch (Ind.)

== Election results ==
=== 2022 election ===
North Coast - 5 seats
Party	Candidate	FPv%	Count											
Party	Candidate	FPv%	1	2	3	4	5	6	7	8	9	10	11	12
SNP	Eleanor Collier	17.5	1,724											
Independent	Ian Murdoch (Note: Sitting councillor for North Coast and Cumbraes.)	17.4	1,718											
Conservative	Todd Ferguson (Note: Sitting councillor for Dalry and West Kilbride.)	16.5	1,633	1,633	1,641									
Conservative	Tom Marshall	13.5	1,331	1,331	1,341	1,341	1,346	1,349	1,352	1,379	1,412	1,439	1,442	1,677
SNP	Alan Hill	13.4	1,325	1,393	1,405	1,405	1,420	1,461	1,474	1,485	1,545	1,756		
Labour	Valerie Reid	10.1	995	996	1,004	1,004	1,010	1,014	1,066	1,128	1,175	1,298	1,325	
Green	David John Nairn	3.9	392	397	404	404	417	427	440	478	527			
Independent	Wendy Low-Thomson	2.3	234	234	249	249	267	291	299	326				
Liberal Democrats	Margaret McLellan	2.0	203	203	206	206	208	210	219					
Socialist Labour	James McDaid	1.1	118	118	119	119	120	125						
Alba	Jane Fraser	1.0	100	101	101	101	105							
ISP	Nick Hobson	0.7	72	72	74	74								
Electorate: 18,557 Valid: 9,845 Spoilt: 160 Quota: 1,641 Turnout: 53.9%
