= 1977 Cunninghame District Council election =

Cunninghame District Council election

- 3 May 1977

All 24 seats to Cunninghame District Council 13 seats needed for a majority
- Turnout: 49.8% (Note: Excludes uncontested wards.)
	First party	Second party
	SNP	Lab
Party	SNP	Labour
Last election	0 seats, 5.2%	13 seats, 41.3%
Seats won	11	5
Seat change	▲11	▼8
Popular vote	16,907	12,987
Percentage	36.5%	28.0%
Swing	▲30.7	▼13.3
	Third party	Fourth party
	Con	Mod
Party	Conservative	Moderates
Last election	4 seats, 28.3%	2 seats, 5.9%
Seats won	5	2
Seat change	▲1	Steady
Popular vote	11,369	2,365
Percentage	24.6%	5.1%
Swing	▼3.7	▼0.8
Council Leader before election
Labour
Council Leader after election
No overall control

Elections to Cunninghame District Council were held on 3 May 1977, on the same day as the other Scottish local government elections. This was the second election to the district council following the local government reforms in 1974.

The election used the original 24 wards created by the Formation Electoral Arrangements in 1974. Each ward elected one councillor using first-past-the-post voting.

Labour lost control of the council as their vote collapsed while the Scottish National Party (SNP) rose from no seats in 1974 to become the largest party – two shy of an overall majority. The Conservatives were joint-second with Labour on five seats while two Moderates and one independent candidate were elected.

== Background ==
Following the implementation of the Local Government (Scotland) Act 1973, a two-tier system of local government comprising nine regions, 53 districts and three island areas was introduced the following year. The 1977 elections would be the second district elections since their establishment.

At the previous election in 1974, Labour won an overall majority by taking 13 of the 24 seats and 41.3% of the popular vote. Five independent candidates were elected along with four Conservatives and two Moderates.

A split in Labour occurred in January 1976 led by Jim Sillars, then MP for South Ayrshire, John Robertson, then MP for Paisley, and Alex Neil which resulted in the formation of the nationalist Scottish Labour Party (SLP). The 1977 district elections would be their first electoral test.

Across Scotland, the SNP made a major effort to gain control of district councils as they contested almost 200 more wards in 1977 than in 1974. Much of the discussion in the media during the election campaigns was their attack on Labour's heartlands in the west of Scotland which included Cunninghame where the party named 17 more candidates than the previous election.

The Local Government (Scotland) Act 1973 intended for elections to both districts and regions to be held every four years. However, due to concerns that two votes could potentially confuse electors, district elections were held after three years for the first two elections in order that elections could be held every even-numbered year alternating between district and regional elections.

== Results ==
1977 Cunninghame District Council election result
Party	Seats	Gains	Losses	Net gain/loss	Seats %	Votes %	Votes	+/−
SNP	11	11	0	▲11	45.8	36.5	16,907	▲30.7
Labour	5	0	8	▼8	20.8	28.0	12,987	▼13.3
Conservative	5	2	1	▲1	20.8	24.6	11,369	▼3.7
Moderates	2	1	1	Steady	8.3	5.1	2,365	▼0.8
Independent	1	0	4	▼4	4.2	2.9	1,342	▼15.4
SLP	0	0	0	Steady	0.0	1.7	771	New
Liberal	0	0	0	Steady	0.0	1.2	564	New
Total	24						46,305	

== Ward results ==
=== Saltcoats North ===
Saltcoats North
Party	Candidate	Votes	%
Labour	Angela Dunbar	688	41.8
SNP	M. Brown	596	36.3
Conservative	I. MacKenzie	290	17.6
Liberal	P. Giffney	70	4.3
Majority		92	
Turnout			48.0
Registered electors		3,441	
Labour hold			

=== Saltcoats East ===
Saltcoats East
Party	Candidate	Votes	%
Labour	George Barnett	649	39.2
SNP	A. Arnott	577	34.9
Independent	J. McCann	290	17.6
Liberal	J. MacIntosh	67	4.1
Majority		72	
Turnout			49.3
Registered electors		3,367	
Labour hold			

=== Arran ===
Arran
Party	Candidate	Votes	%
Independent	E. Sillars	Unopposed	
Registered electors		2,942	
Independent hold			

== Aftermath ==
The Scottish National Party (SNP) made significant gains to go from no seats in 1974 to the largest party but they ended two seats short of an overall majority. Their vote share increased by 30 percentage points as they took 11 of the 24 seats. Amidst national unpopularity, Labour lost control of the council as their vote collapsed. In total, their vote share fell by 13 percentage points and they lost eight of their 13 seats. The Conservatives made gains despite a fall in their vote share as they increased their number on the council from four to five. Two moderates and one independent candidate were also elected.

Across Scotland, Labour retained their position as the largest party at district level but lost control of several districts including Cunninghame.

The SLP made no inroads in Cunninghame as they won just 1.7% of the vote and failed to win any seats. Across Scotland, they won just three district seats and the party dissolved in 1981.
