= Horsey =

Horsey may refer to:

- Horse, in baby-talk

== Places ==
The name comes from Anglo-Saxon "hors-eg" and means horse-island.

- Horsey, Norfolk, England
- Horsey, Somerset, England
- Horsey, Virginia, United States
- Horsey Down, near Lechlade
- Horsey Island, near Walton-on-the-Naze in Essex, England
- Horsey Island, Devon, a nature reserve near Braunton, England; see Braunton Canal
- Horsey Mere, one of the Norfolk Broads in the east of England

== People ==
- David Horsey (born 1951), American editorial cartoonist
- David Horsey (golfer) (born 1985), English professional golfer
- Edward Horsey (1525–1583), conspirator against Queen Mary I of England
- Henry R. Horsey (1924–2016), American jurist
- Jerome Horsey (c. 1550–1626), English explorer, diplomat and politician
- John Horsey (died 1546) (1489–1546), knight of Henry VIII of England
- John Horsey (died 1564) (1510–1564), knight of Henry VIII, son of above
- Michael Horsey (born 1949), American politician from Philadelphia
- Outerbridge Horsey (1777–1842), lawyer and U.S. Senator from Delaware
- Christopher Horsey (born 1972), Australian entertainer

== Other uses ==
- Horsey (album), album by Current 93
- Horsey (band), an English rock band from London
- Horsey (film), a 1997 Canadian independent film

== See also ==
- Justice Horsey (disambiguation)
