= Saltcoats and Stevenston (ward) =

Electoral ward in North Ayrshire

- North Ayrshire
- Population: 21,925 (2021)
- Electorate: 16,951 (2022)
- Major settlements: Saltcoats; Stevenston
- Scottish Parliament constituency: Cunninghame South; Cunninghame North
- Scottish Parliament region: West Scotland
- UK Parliament constituency: North Ayrshire and Arran

Current ward
- Created: 2022
- Number of councillors: 5
- Councillor: Jean McClung (SNP)
- Councillor: Jim Montgomerie (Labour)
- Councillor: Davina McTeirnan (SNP)
- Councillor: John Sweeney (Labour)
- Councillor: Cameron Inglis (Conservative)
- Created from: Saltcoats; Stevenston

2007–2017
- Number of councillors: 4
- Replaced by: Saltcoats; Stevenston
- Created from: Ardrossan North; Kilwinning West; Saltcoats East; Saltcoats North; South Beach; Stevenston North; Stevenston South

Saltcoats and Stevenston is one of the nine wards used to elect members of North Ayrshire Council. Re-established in 2022, the ward elects five councillors using the single transferable vote electoral system and covers an area with a population of 21,925 people.

The ward was originally created in 2007 and elected four councillors before it was abolished in 2017. It was a Labour stronghold with the party holding half the seats. However, the re-established ward has been split between Labour and the Scottish National Party (SNP) with both parties holding two of the five seats.

== Boundaries ==
The ward was initially created following the Fourth Statutory Reviews of Electoral Arrangements ahead of the 2007 Scottish local elections. As a result of the Local Governance (Scotland) Act 2004, local elections in Scotland would use the single transferable vote electoral system from 2007 onwards so Saltcoats and Stevenston was formed from an amalgamation of several previous first-past-the-post wards. It contained all of the former Saltcoats East and Stevenston South wards, the eastern halves of the former Saltcoats North and South Beach wards, the southern half of the former Stevenston North ward and a small part of both the Ardrossan North and Kilwinning West wards. As the name suggests, Saltcoats and Stevenston covered the adjoining towns of Saltcoats and Stevenston on the Firth of Clyde coast in the west of mainland North Ayrshire. Following the Fifth Statutory Reviews of Electoral Arrangements prior to the 2017 local elections, the ward was abolished in favour of two three-member wards for each town – Saltcoats and Stevenston. However, this was reversed after the introduction of the Islands (Scotland) Act 2018 which coincided with the introduction of the Scottish Elections (Reform) Act 2020 which allowed for the creation of five-member wards. The 2019 Reviews of Electoral Arrangements proposed that Saltcoats and Stevenston be re-instated covering a slightly larger area than the original and electing five members instead of four.

== Councillors ==
Election	Councillors				
2007	Willie Gibson (SNP)	David Munn (Labour)	Ronnie McNicol (Ind.)	Alan Munro (Labour)	
2011 by-election	Willie Gibson (SNP)	Jim Montgomerie (Labour)	Ronnie McNicol (Ind.)	Alan Munro (Labour)	
2012	Willie Gibson (SNP)	Jim Montgomerie (Labour)	Ronnie McNicol (Ind.)	Alan Munro (Labour)	
2017	Abolished				
2022	Jean McClung (SNP)	Jim Montgomerie (Labour)	Davina McTeirnan (SNP)	John Sweeney (Labour)	Cameron Inglis (Conservative)

== Election results ==
=== 2022 election ===
Saltcoats and Stevenston - 5 seats
Party	Candidate	FPv%	Count							
Party	Candidate	FPv%	1	2	3	4	5	6	7	8
SNP	Jean McClung (Note: Sitting councillor for Saltcoats.)	29.3	1,908							
Labour	Jim Montgomerie	28.0	1,822							
Labour	John Sweeney (Note: Sitting councillor for Stevenston.)	12.2	796	811	1,350					
Conservative	Cameron Inglis	11.4	742	745	772	776	814	828	857	1,103
SNP	Davina McTeirnan	10.2	666	1,402						
Independent	Ronnie McNicol	5.6	366	394	448	486	527	605	702	
ISP	David Higgins	1.7	111	120	127	206	219	235		
Independent	Jimmy Miller	1.4	95	97	119	140	182			
Electorate: 16,951 Valid: 6,506 Spoilt: 202 Quota: 1,085 Turnout: 39.6%

=== 2012 election ===
Saltcoats and Stevenston - 4 seats
Party	Candidate	FPv%	Count							
Party	Candidate	FPv%	1	2	3	4	5	6	7	8
Labour	Jim Montgomerie	36.2	1,926							
SNP	Willie Gibson (incumbent)	23.4	1,244							
Independent	Ronnie McNicol (incumbent)	13.2	703	771	789	796	816	884	993	1,210
Labour	Alan Munro (incumbent)	10.1	540	1,124						
SNP	Nan Wallace	9.0	481	510	642	650	667	688	729	
Conservative	David Rocks	3.6	193	198	199	201	205			
Scottish Senior Citizens	Jimmy Miller	3.1	163	210	216	225	239	282		
Socialist Labour	Debbie Anderson	1.4	76	91	94	100				
Electorate: 15,274 Valid: 5,326 Spoilt: 138 Quota: 1,066 Turnout: 34.9%

=== 2011 by-election ===
A by-election arose in the Saltcoats and Stevenston ward following the resignation of the Labour Party's David Munn, and Jim Montgomorie held the seat for Labour on 25 August 2011.

Saltcoats and Stevenston by-election (25 August 2011) - 1 seat
Party	Candidate	FPv%	Count				
Party	Candidate	FPv%	1	2	3	4	5
Labour	Jim Montgomerie	48.7	1,914	1,927	1,936	1,963	2,039
SNP	Nan Wallace	33.2	1,306	1,311	1,326	1,363	1,425
Conservative	Chris Barr	7.2	284	286	297	308	331
Scottish Senior Citizens	Jimmy Miller	5.4	211	217	222	240	
Independent	Gerard Pollock	2.9	114	117	123		
Liberal Democrats	Gordon Bain	1.4	56	57			
Socialist Labour	Louise McDaid	1.1	43				
Electorate: 11,039 Valid: 2,764 Spoilt: 42 Quota: 1,965 Turnout: 25.4%

=== 2007 election ===
Saltcoats and Stevenston - 4 seats
Party	Candidate	FPv%	Count						
Party	Candidate	FPv%	1	2	3	4	5	6	7
SNP	William Gibson	22.4	1,629						
Independent	Ronnie McNicol	18.8	1,362	1,380	1,577				
Labour	David Munn	13.0	943	951	968	978	1,045	1,344	1,531
Labour	Alan Munro	12.4	902	907	953	961	1,000	1,254	1,482
SNP	Nan Wallace	9.5	691	800	890	919	1,051	1,094	
Labour	Sam Taylor	9.4	683	685	709	714	743		
Conservative	Stewart Ferguson	7.6	554	557	594	619			
Independent	Margaret Walsh	6.8	496	501					
Electorate: 15,039 Valid: 7,260 Spoilt: 189 Quota: 1,453 Turnout: 49.5%
