= 1974 Cunninghame District Council election =

Cunninghame District Council election

| 7 May 1974 | 1977 → |

All 24 seats to Cunninghame District Council 13 seats needed for a majority
- Registered: 90,565
- Turnout: 52.5% (Note: Excludes uncontested wards.)
| | First party | Second party |
|---|---|---|
| | Lab | Ind |
| Party | Labour | Independent |
| Seats won | 13 | 5 |
| Popular vote | 18,040 | 8,000 |
| Percentage | 41.3% | 18.3% |
| | Third party | Fourth party |
| | Con | Mod |
| Party | Conservative | Moderates |
| Seats won | 4 | 2 |
| Popular vote | 12,398 | 2,598 |
| Percentage | 28.3% | 8.3% |
Council Leader after election
Labour

Elections to Cunninghame District Council were held on 7 May 1974, on the same day as the other Scottish local government elections. This was the first election to the district council following the implementation of the Local Government (Scotland) Act 1973.

The election used the 24 wards created by the Formation Electoral Arrangements in 1974. Each ward elected one councillor using first-past-the-post voting.

Labour took control of the council after winning a majority. The party took 13 of the 24 seats and more than 40% of the popular vote. Independent candidates won five seats and the Conservatives took four. The remaining two seats were won by Moderates

== Background ==
Prior to 1974, the area that was to become Cunninghame, was split between two counties – the County of Ayr and the County of Bute. Within that were six of the 17 burghs of the County of Ayr (Ardrossan, Irvine, Kilwinning, Largs, Saltcoats and Stevenston) and one of the two burghs of the County of Bute (Millport). These were all small burghs so the burgh council had limited powers which included some control over planning as well as local taxation, building control, housing, lighting and drainage with the rest of the local government responsibility falling to the county council.

Following the recommendations in the Wheatly Report, the old system of counties and burghs – which had resulted in a mishmash of local government areas in which some small burghs had larger populations but far fewer responsibilities than some large burghs and even counties – was to be replaced by a new system of regional and district councils. The Local Government (Scotland) Act 1973 implemented most of the recommendations in the Wheatly Report. The northern part of the County of Ayr which included the six burghs and the landward areas of Kilbirnie, West Kilbride and Irvine was combined with the islands of Arran and The Cumbraes from the County of Bute and was placed into the Cunninghame district within the Strathclyde region.

== Results ==
1974 Cunninghame District Council election result
| Party | Seats | Gains | Losses | Net gain/loss | Seats % | Votes % | Votes | +/− |
|---|---|---|---|---|---|---|---|---|
| Labour | 13 | | | N/A | 54.2 | 41.3 | 18,040 | N/A |
| Independent | 5 | | | N/A | 20.8 | 18.3 | 8,000 | N/A |
| Conservative | 4 | | | N/A | 16.7 | 28.3 | 12,398 | N/A |
| Moderates | 2 | | | N/A | 8.3 | 5.9 | 2,598 | N/A |
| SNP | 0 | | | N/A | 0.0 | 5.2 | 2,288 | N/A |
| Independent Socialist | 0 | | | N/A | 0.0 | 0.9 | 394 | N/A |
| Total | 24 | | | | | | 43,718 | |

== Ward results ==
=== Saltcoats North ===
Saltcoats North
| Party | Candidate | Votes | % |
|---|---|---|---|
| Labour | David White | Unopposed | |
| Majority | | | |
| Turnout | | | |
| Registered electors | | 3,448 | |
| Labour win (new seat) | | | |

=== Saltcoats East ===
Saltcoats East
| Party | Candidate | Votes | % |
|---|---|---|---|
| Labour | George Barnett | 1,089 | 65.9 |
| Conservative | Margaret McGregor | 564 | 34.1 |
| Majority | | 525 | |
| Turnout | | 1,653 | 48.2 |
| Registered electors | | 3,478 | |
| Labour win (new seat) | | | |

=== West Kilbride ===
West Kilbride
| Party | Candidate | Votes | % |
|---|---|---|---|
| Independent | Alexander Jack | 844 | 47.1 |
| Independent | A. Stewart | 730 | 40.8 |
| Labour | J. Watson | 217 | 12.1 |
| Majority | | 114 | 17.3 |
| Turnout | | 1,791 | 54.5 |
| Registered electors | | 3,304 | |
| Independent win (new seat) | | | |

=== Arran ===
Arran
| Party | Candidate | Votes | % |
|---|---|---|---|
| Independent | Evelyn Sillars | 740 | 45.8 |
| SNP | G. Glen | 461 | 28.5 |
| Independent | D. McNiven | 415 | 25.7 |
| Majority | | 279 | 17.3 |
| Turnout | | 1,616 | 59.1 |
| Registered electors | | 2,743 | |
| Independent win (new seat) | | | |

== Aftermath ==
Cunninghame was one of 11 districts in the newly created Strathclyde region that was won by Labour. Independent candidates won five seats and the Conservatives took four. The remaining two seats were won by Moderates. Labour also won control of the regional council which held its first election on the same day. Across Scotland, Labour won the most votes, the most seats and the most councils of any party.
