= Katy Clark =

Scottish politician and life peer (born 1967)

The Right Honourable The Baroness Clark of Kilwinning MSP
- Official portrait, 2026

Deputy Presiding Officer of the Scottish Parliament
- Incumbent
- Assumed office 14 May 2026 Serving with Clare Adamson
- Presiding Officer: Kenneth Gibson
- Preceded by: Liam McArthur

Member of the Scottish Parliament for West Scotland (1 of 7 Regional MSPs)
- Incumbent
- Assumed office 6 May 2021

Member of the House of Lords
- Lord Temporal
- Life peerage 3 September 2020 – 19 May 2026

Member of Parliament for North Ayrshire and Arran
- In office 5 May 2005 – 30 March 2015
- Preceded by: Brian Wilson (Note: MP for predecessor constituency of Cunninghame North)
- Succeeded by: Patricia Gibson

Scottish Labour portfolios
- 2021–2026: Shadow Minister for Community Safety

Personal details
- Born: Kathryn Sloan Clark; 3 July 1967 (age 59) Kilwinning, North Ayrshire, Scotland
- Party: Labour
- Children: 1
- Education: University of Aberdeen; University of Edinburgh
- Occupation: Politician
- Profession: Solicitor

Katy Clark, Baroness Clark of Kilwinning (born 3 July 1967), is a British politician and life peer who has served as Deputy Presiding Officer of the Scottish Parliament, alongside Clare Adamson, since May 2026, and as a Member of the Scottish Parliament (MSP) for the West Scotland region since the 2021 Scottish Parliament election. A member of the Labour Party, she was previously the Member of Parliament (MP) for North Ayrshire and Arran from 2005 to 2015.

== Early life and career ==
Clark was born in Kilwinning, and went to Ayr Grammar Primary School then Kyle Academy, both in Ayr, before attending the University of Aberdeen, receiving an LLB in 1990. She was Chair of Aberdeen University Labour Club, NUS (Scotland) Women's Officer and active in women's campaigns, anti-poll tax campaigning, and the campaigns against the Gulf and Iraq Wars. She received a Diploma in Legal Practice from the University of Edinburgh in 1991. She qualified as a solicitor in England, Scotland and Wales specialising in civil litigation, criminal defence work and employment law. She was active in the MSF trade union and Edinburgh and District Trades Council in the 1990s before joining the TGWU in 1998.

She was a solicitor in private practice in Edinburgh and Musselburgh from 1991 to 1998, an Executive Member of the Scottish Council for Civil Liberties, and a legal officer, then Head of Membership Legal Services with UNISON nationally from 1998 to 2005. Whilst at the latter organisation, she undertook employment litigation, including Europe's biggest equal pay case, in which she won £35m in back pay for female nurses and other medical staff in the North West of England who had been unlawfully underpaid compared with their male colleagues.

She joined the Labour Party at the age of seventeen and is a member of the Unite, GMB and UNISON trade unions. Her great-great grandfather, Alexander ("Sandy") Sloan, was Labour MP for South Ayrshire from 1939 until his death in 1945.

== House of Commons: 2005–2015 ==
Clark unsuccessfully contested the parliamentary seat of Galloway and Upper Nithsdale at the 1997 general election, a traditional Conservative and Scottish National Party (SNP) marginal. She finished in third place behind the Secretary of State for Trade and Industry Ian Lang, who lost his seat to the SNP's Alasdair Morgan.

She was elected to the House of Commons at the 2005 general election for the new seat of North Ayrshire and Arran, based substantially on the former seat of Cunninghame North, whose MP Brian Wilson had retired, and the towns of Stevenston and Kilwinning from the old Cunninghame South. She had a majority of 11,296, and made her maiden speech on 7 June 2005. She was nominated for House magazine's 'Maiden Speech of the Year'. Following the election, The Guardian named her as one of eight new MPs "to watch".

=== Campaigns ===
==== Socialism and anti-austerity ====
One of the few left-wing members of Labour's 2005 intake of MPs, she was a member of the Socialist Campaign Group and a founder member of the Scottish Labour Party Campaign for Socialism. Of the twenty-four members of the Campaign Group, she was the only one under the age of 50.

In 2010, Clark was one of only seven MPs to vote for left-winger Diane Abbott in the 2010 Labour Leadership Election. In February 2013, she was among those who gave their support to the People's Assembly Against Austerity in a letter published by The Guardian newspaper, and was co-chair of the Labour Assembly Against Austerity.

Clark established a reputation as a rebel within the Parliamentary Labour Party, voting against ID cards. However, she did not consider herself to be a rebel, stating that her "views are consistent with Labour's traditions". She was one of 16 signatories of an open letter to party leader Ed Miliband in January 2015, calling on the party to commit to oppose further austerity, take rail franchises back into public ownership and strengthen collective bargaining arrangements.

==== Human rights and internationalism ====
Clark campaigned on human rights issues, and was one of 95 Labour MPs who opposed replacing Britain's Trident nuclear weapons system. She supported a 'No' vote in the 2011 AV Referendum.

Clark supported the call for the recognition of the state of Palestine. She was amongst a handful of MPs who opposed the bombing of Libya, and was a member of the Committees on Arms Export Controls, regularly calling for stricter limits on arms sales.

Clark is a Patron of the Greek Solidarity Campaign.

==== Refugee rights ====
Clark campaigned to support European Union emergency plans to ensure safety for migrants crossing the Mediterranean.

==== LGBT rights ====
Throughout her time as an MP, Clark consistently voted in favour of increased rights for LGBT+ people, including voting in favour of same-sex marriage in 2013.

==== Constituency campaigns ====
On local issues, she campaigned against the contracting out of Calmac lifeline ferry services, with her first Parliamentary Question being about the tendering of services; for compensation of the victims of the Farepak Christmas savings scheme; against the privatisation of DM Beith; against the closure of Coastguard Stations and job centres; and for the retraining of former workers employed at the closed Simclar factory.

==== Trade union campaigns ====
She was Secretary of the Trade Union Group of Labour MPs and Chair of the CWU Group of MPs, taking up many trade union, equalities, human rights, consumer and employment rights issues in Parliament. She was also a member of the GMB, UNISON, FBU, Bakers Union, NUJ, UNITE, PCS, RMT, ASLEF and TSSA Parliamentary Groups.

==== Royal Mail privatisation ====
As a member of the Business, Innovation and Skills Committee, Clark held UBS and Goldman Sachs bankers to account, questioning them over their valuation of the Royal Mail during its privatisation.

=== Scottish Deputy Leadership Campaign 2014 ===
Clark was not elected when she stood as a left candidate to be Deputy Leader of the Scottish Labour Party in 2014, arguing for a change in direction. She lost her Commons seat of North Ayrshire and Arran at the May 2015 general election to the SNP candidate Patricia Gibson.

== Leadership of Jeremy Corbyn: 2015–2020 ==
Clark was an early supporter of Jeremy Corbyn's 2015 leadership campaign. a key strategist on the campaign and was appointed as his Political Secretary in November 2015, following his election as leader.

In 2017, Corbyn tasked Clark with leading a review into the democratic functioning of the Labour Party at every level, including Labour Leadership Elections, the makeup of the National Executive Committee, giving Labour members greater say in party policy, building Constituency Labour Parties, local and regional Government and improving the situation of women, LGBT+, BAME, disabled and young members.

Announcing the review in a message to Labour Members, Clark said:

We want our members to be at the heart of our party – to have more power – over policy, how we campaign, organise and run our party, just as we want the people of Britain to be at the heart of deciding how our communities, economy and society are organised. That is what the democracy review is about.

The Democracy Review reported in September 2018, and rule changes to increase party democracy were adopted. Clark has suggested that she would like these reforms to go further and that some of her proposed reforms were watered down.

Clark was proposed as a candidate to stand in Rochdale prior to the 2017 general election, having previously withdrawn from consideration for election to the Leigh constituency because of accusations by local members of her being a parachute candidate. Clark was not elected when she stood as a Labour candidate on the London list at the 2019 European Parliament election. Later in 2019, she was shortlisted along with local councillors Ibrahim Dogus and Florence Eshalomi for the South London seat of Vauxhall at that year's general election, securing a personal endorsement from John McDonnell as well as the left-wing campaign group Momentum. Clark finished in second place losing out to Eshalomi.

== House of Lords and Scottish Parliament: 2020–present ==
Clark was created Baroness Clark of Kilwinning, of Kilwinning in the County of Ayrshire, on 3 September 2020, under which name she was a member of the House of Lords as a Labour peer between 2019 and 2026.

Clark was elected as a member of the Scottish Parliament for the West Scotland region for the Scottish Labour Party, having also stood as its candidate for the Cunninghame North constituency at the 2021 Scottish Parliament election. Prior to her election, Clark previously expressed her intent to 'stand down' from the House of Lords if elected to Holyrood. She took a leave of absence in May 2021, due to being elected to the Scottish Parliament.

She was appointed as Shadow Minister for Community Safety in the Scottish Labour shadow cabinet in May 2021.

Clark was one of five Labour MSPs who was absent for a Scottish Parliament vote calling for the UK Government to reverse its decision to means-test the Winter Fuel Payment.

Following the 2026 Scottish Parliament election, Clark was elected as deputy presiding officer of the Scottish Parliament, along with Clare Adamson. In May 2026, she resigned from the House of Lords.

== Views ==
Clark is a socialist and was regarded as being on the left of the Parliamentary party when she was an MP. Clark supported the eurosceptic Labour Against the Euro campaign and campaigned against an EU constitution. She was opposed to Prime Minister Boris Johnson's Brexit plan, called for a second referendum and was committed to campaigning for "remain" if such a vote were to take place.

== Personal life ==
Clark has lived in Scotland and Vauxhall, having moved to London in 1998, and has a daughter.

== Notes ==
Parliament of the United Kingdom
Preceded by Brian Wilson	Member of Parliament for North Ayrshire and Arran; 2005–2015	Succeeded by Patricia Gibson
