= Dalry and West Kilbride (ward) =

Former electoral ward in North Ayrshire

- North Ayrshire
- Boundary of Dalry and West Kilbride in North Ayrshire from 2017–2022.
- Electorate: 10,476 (2021)
- Major settlements: Dalry; West Kilbride
- Scottish Parliament constituency: Cunninghame North
- Scottish Parliament region: West Scotland
- UK Parliament constituency: North Ayrshire and Arran

2007–2022
- Number of councillors: 3
- Replaced by: Ardrossan; Garnock Valley; North Coast
- Created from: Ardrossan North; Dalry; Garnock East; Kilbirnie South; Kilwinning West; Largs South and Fairlie; West Kilbride

Dalry and West Kilbride was one of the 10 wards used to elect members of North Ayrshire Council. Created in 2007 following the Fourth Statutory Reviews of Electoral Arrangements, the ward elected three councillors using the single transferable vote electoral system. As a result of the Islands (Scotland) Act 2018, the ward was abolished in 2022.

The ward latterly produced strong results for the Conservatives but was previously split between the Scottish National Party (SNP), Conservatives and independents.

== Boundaries ==
The ward was created following the Fourth Statutory Reviews of Electoral Arrangements ahead of the 2007 Scottish local elections. As a result of the Local Governance (Scotland) Act 2004, local elections in Scotland would use the single transferable vote electoral system from 2007 onwards so Dalry and West Kilbride was formed from an amalgamation of several previous first-past-the-post wards. It contained the southern part of the former Largs South and Fairlie ward, the majority of the former Ardrossan North, Garnock East and Kilbirnie South wards as well as all of the former Dalry and West Kilbride wards and the northern half of the former Kilwinning West ward. Dalry and West Kilbride rans across the council area from the Firth of Clyde to the easternmost part of the council area between its borders with East Ayrshire and East Renfrewshire and centred around the towns of Dalry and West Kilbride. Following the Fifth Statutory Reviews of Electoral Arrangements ahead of the 2017 Scottish local elections, the ward was increased in area as the northern boundary was moved to run along the A737 up to the council's border with Renfrewshire, taking in an area that was previously part of the Kilbirnie and Beith ward.

In 2018, the Scottish Parliament passed the Islands (Scotland) Act 2018 which included provisions to improve the representation of island communities on councils. As a result, an intermediate review of the boundaries in North Ayrshire was carried out. The review coincided with the introduction of the Scottish Elections (Reform) Act 2020 which allowed for the creation of five-member wards. This proposed that three wards – Dalry and West Kilbride, Kilbirnie and Beith and North Coast and Cumbraes – be replaced by two new wards named Garnock Valley and North Coast. The proposals for North Ayrshire were subsequently approved by the Scottish Parliament and the ward was abolished in 2022.

== Councillors ==
| Year | Councillors | | |
|---|---|---|---|
| 2007 | Elizabeth McLardy (Ind.) | John Reid (Labour) | Robert Barr (Conservative /Ind.) |
| 2010 | Elizabeth McLardy (Ind.) | John Reid (Labour) | Robert Barr (Conservative /Ind.) |
| 2012 | Elizabeth McLardy (Ind.) | Catherine McMillan (SNP) | Robert Barr (Conservative /Ind.) |
| 2017 | Todd Ferguson (Conservative) | Joy Brahim (SNP) | Robert Barr (Conservative /Ind.) |
| 2021 by-election | Todd Ferguson (Conservative) | Ronnie Stalker (Conservative) | Robert Barr (Conservative /Ind.) |

== Election results ==
=== 2021 by-election ===
Dalry and West Kilbride by-election (12 August 2021) – 1 seat
| Party | Candidate | FPv% | Count |
| Party | Candidate | FPv% | 1 |
|---|---|---|---|
| Conservative | Ronnie Stalker | 53.5 | 2,016 |
| SNP | Robyn Graham | 34.3 | 1,292 |
| Labour | Valerie Reid | 8.1 | 305 |
| Liberal Democrats | Ruby Kirkwood | 1.5 | 58 |
| Socialist Labour | James McDaid | 1.5 | 57 |
| Independent | John Willis | 1.1 | 42 |
Electorate: 10,476 Valid: 3,770 Spoilt: 31 Quota: 1,886 Turnout: 36.3%

=== 2017 election ===
Dalry and West Kilbride - 3 seats
| Party | Candidate | FPv% | Count | | | | | |
| Party | Candidate | FPv% | 1 | 2 | 3 | 4 | 5 | 6 |
|---|---|---|---|---|---|---|---|---|
| SNP | Joy Brahim | 23.8 | 1,219 | 1,223 | 1,247 | 1,289 | | |
| Conservative | Todd Ferguson | 22.2 | 1,137 | 1,137 | 1,177 | 1,247 | 1,247 | 1,314 |
| Independent | Robert Barr (incumbent) | 19.3 | 990 | 995 | 1,147 | 1,222 | 1,223 | 1,361 |
| Independent | Kay Hall | 11.7 | 599 | 600 | 619 | 780 | 782 | 867 |
| Labour | Paul Reid | 8.4 | 432 | 437 | 468 | 498 | 499 | |
| Independent | Elizabeth McLardy (incumbent) | 8.2 | 418 | 423 | 433 | | | |
| Independent | Sheena Woodside | 5.9 | 301 | 307 | | | | |
| Independent | John Willis | 0.5 | 27 | | | | | |
Electorate: 10,027 Valid: 5,123 Spoilt: 91 Quota: 1,281 Turnout: 52.0%

=== 2012 election ===
Dalry and West Kilbride - 3 seats
| Party | Candidate | FPv% | Count | | | | | | |
| Party | Candidate | FPv% | 1 | 2 | 3 | 4 | 5 | 6 | 7 |
|---|---|---|---|---|---|---|---|---|---|
| Independent | Robert Barr (incumbent) | 29.4 | 1,278 | | | | | | |
| SNP | Catherine McMillan | 22.6 | 982 | 1,010 | 1,018 | 1,041 | 1,077 | 1,084 | 1,340 |
| Independent | Elizabeth McLardy (incumbent) | 19.6 | 853 | 884 | 899 | 929 | 1,117 | | |
| Labour | John Reid (incumbent) | 16.0 | 697 | 729 | 737 | 765 | 810 | 815 | |
| Conservative | Davina Saunders | 9.8 | 425 | 447 | 450 | 450 | | | |
| Socialist Labour | Louise McDaid | 2.2 | 94 | 97 | 99 | | | | |
| Independent | John Willis | 0.5 | 24 | 41 | | | | | |
Electorate: 9,513 Valid: 4,353 Spoilt: 47 Quota: 1,089 Turnout: 45.8%

=== 2007 election ===
Dalry and West Kilbride - 3 seats
| Party | Candidate | FPv% | Count | | | | | | |
| Party | Candidate | FPv% | 1 | 2 | 3 | 4 | 5 | 6 | 7 |
|---|---|---|---|---|---|---|---|---|---|
| Independent | Elizabeth McLardy | 29.0 | 1,637 | | | | | | |
| Labour | John Reid | 20.7 | 1,176 | 1,196 | 1,245 | 1,292 | 1,305 | 1,375 | 1,682 |
| SNP | Catherine McMillan | 19.1 | 1,084 | 1,117 | 1,157 | 1,198 | 1,209 | 1,261 | |
| Conservative | Robert Barr (Note: Cllr Robert Barr quit the Conservatives on 24 June 2010 and became an independent.) | 17.0 | 962 | 994 | 1,003 | 1,036 | 1,220 | 1,301 | 1,568 |
| Conservative | Ian Richardson | 4.3 | 242 | 252 | 256 | 266 | | | |
| Independent | David Park | 3.8 | 213 | 247 | 264 | 288 | 301 | | |
| Liberal Democrats | Susan Clark | 3.1 | 174 | 190 | 198 | | | | |
| Socialist Labour | Louise McDaid | 2.9 | 162 | 182 | | | | | |
Electorate: 9,796 Valid: 5,650 Spoilt: 66 Quota: 1,413 Turnout: 58.3%
