= Saltcoats (ward) =

Electoral ward in North Ayrshire

- North Ayrshire
- Boundary of Saltcoats in North Ayrshire from 2017–2022.
- Electorate: 10,007 (2017)
- Major settlements: Saltcoats
- Scottish Parliament constituency: Cunninghame North
- Scottish Parliament region: West Scotland
- UK Parliament constituency: North Ayrshire and Arran

2017–2022
- Number of councillors: 3
- Replaced by: Ardrossan; Saltcoats and Stevenston
- Created from: Ardrossan and Arran; Saltcoats and Stevenston

Saltcoats was one of the 10 electoral wards of North Ayrshire Council. Created in 2017 following the Fifth Statutory Reviews of Electoral Arrangements, the ward elected three councillors using the single transferable vote electoral system. As a result of the Islands (Scotland) Act 2018, the ward was abolished in 2022.

The area was politically split after each election returned one councillor for both the Scottish National Party (SNP) and Labour as well as one independent councillor.

== Boundaries ==
The ward was created following the Fifth Statutory Reviews of Electoral Arrangements ahead of the 2017 Scottish local elections. This was the first review after the introduction of the single transferable vote electoral system in 2007. Saltcoats was one of three new wards created in North Ayrshire as the total number of councillors was increased to more evenly balance electoral parity in the region. The ward centered around the town of Saltcoats in the southwest of the council area and included part of Ardrossan. It was formed from the western half of the Saltcoats and Stevenston ward – abolished as part of the review – and the northeastern part of the Ardrossan and Arran ward which was retained but reduced in size.

In 2018, the Scottish Parliament passed the Islands (Scotland) Act 2018 which included provisions to improve the representation of island communities on councils. As a result, an intermediate review of the boundaries in North Ayrshire was carried out. The review coincided with the introduction of the Scottish Elections (Reform) Act 2020 which allowed for the creation of five-member wards. This proposed the abolition of the Saltcoats ward with the area it represented split between a re-established five-member Saltcoats and Stevenston ward and a newly created Ardrossan ward. The proposals for North Ayrshire were subsequently approved by the Scottish Parliament and the ward was abolished in 2022.

== Councillors ==
Election	Councillors		
2017	Jim Montgomerie (Labour)	Jean McClung (SNP)	Ronnie McNicol (Ind.)

== Election results ==
=== 2017 election ===
Saltcoats - 3 seats
Party	Candidate	FPv%	Count						
Party	Candidate	FPv%	1	2	3	4	5	6	7
Labour	Jim Montgomerie (Note: Sitting councillor for Saltcoats and Stevenston ward.)	30.7	1,279						
SNP	Jean McClung	21.6	900	914	914	935	1,508		
Conservative	Brandon Clydesdale	15.8	655	666	682	720	729	749	
SNP	Roberta Bianchini	14.8	619	625	627	637			
Independent	Ronnie McNicol	13.7	570	599	612	677	696	860	1,175
Labour	Valerie Reid	2.4	100	240	249				
UKIP	Caroline Santos	1.1	46	48					
Electorate: 10,007 Valid: 4,169 Spoilt: 134 Quota: 1,043 Turnout: 43.0%
