= Garnock Valley (ward) =

Electoral ward in North Ayrshire

- North Ayrshire
- Population: 20,423 (2021)
- Electorate: 16,364 (2022)
- Major settlements: Beith; Kilbirnie; Dalry
- Scottish Parliament constituency: Cunninghame North
- Scottish Parliament region: West Scotland
- UK Parliament constituency: North Ayrshire and Arran

Current ward
- Created: 2022
- Number of councillors: 5
- Councillor: Donald L. Ried (Independent)
- Councillor: Ronnie Stalker (Conservative)
- Councillor: Anthea Dickson (SNP)
- Councillor: John Bell (Labour)
- Councillor: Margaret Johnson (SNP)
- Created from: Dalry and West Kilbride; Kilbirnie and Beith

Garnock Valley is one of the nine electoral wards of North Ayrshire Council. Created in 2022, the ward elects five councillors using the single transferable vote electoral system and covers an area with a population of 20,423 people.

== Boundaries ==
The ward was created following the 2019 Reviews of Electoral Arrangements which were instigated following the implementation of the Islands (Scotland) Act 2018. The review coincided with the introduction of the Scottish Elections (Reform) Act 2020 which allowed for the creation of five-member wards. Garnock Valley was formed from two previous wards, taking in all of the former Kilbirnie and Beith ward and the eastern half of the former Dalry and West Kilbride ward. The ward covers the easternmost part of the council area and takes in the towns of Barmill, Beith, Dalry and Kilbirnie.

== Councillors ==
Election	Councillors				
2022	Donald L. Reid (Ind.)	Ronnie Stalker (Conservative)	Anthea Dickson (SNP)	John Bell (Labour)	Margaret Johnson (SNP)

== Election results ==
=== 2022 election ===
Garnock Valley - 5 seats
Party	Candidate	FPv%	Count										
Party	Candidate	FPv%	1	2	3	4	5	6	7	8	9	10	11
Independent	Donald L. Reid (Note: Sitting councillor for Kilbirnie and Beith.)	22.8	1,613										
Conservative	Ronnie Stalker (Note: Sitting councillor for Dalry and West Kilbride.)	20.1	1,420										
SNP	Anthea Dickson	19.3	1,362										
SNP	Margaret Johnson	11.9	844	923	935	1,098	1,100	1,103	1,108	1,128	1,141	1,141	1,279
Labour	John Bell	11.4	806	892	910	919	923	924	937	1,095	1,181		
Independent	Robert Barr	5.5	388	464	539	542	550	568	583	597	700	701	
Conservative	Ted Nevill	4.6	327	374	456	457	460	463	472	480			
Labour	James Robson	2.6	190	219	225	226	226	228	235				
Liberal Democrats	Catherine Williamson	0.7	55	63	66	67	70	72					
Freedom Alliance (UK)	Carol Ann Dobson	0.3	27	31	32	34							
Independent	John Willis	0.1	12	34	36	36	38						
Electorate: 16,364 Valid: 7,044 Spoilt: 167 Quota: 1,175 Turnout: 44.1%
