= Justice Horsey =

Justice Horsey may refer to:

- Charles Lee Horsey (1880–1958), associate justice of the Supreme Court of Nevada
- Henry R. Horsey (1924–2016), associate justice of the Delaware Supreme Court
