= Horsey, Virginia =

Unincorporated community in Virginia, United States

Coordinates: 37°55′31″N 75°33′31″W

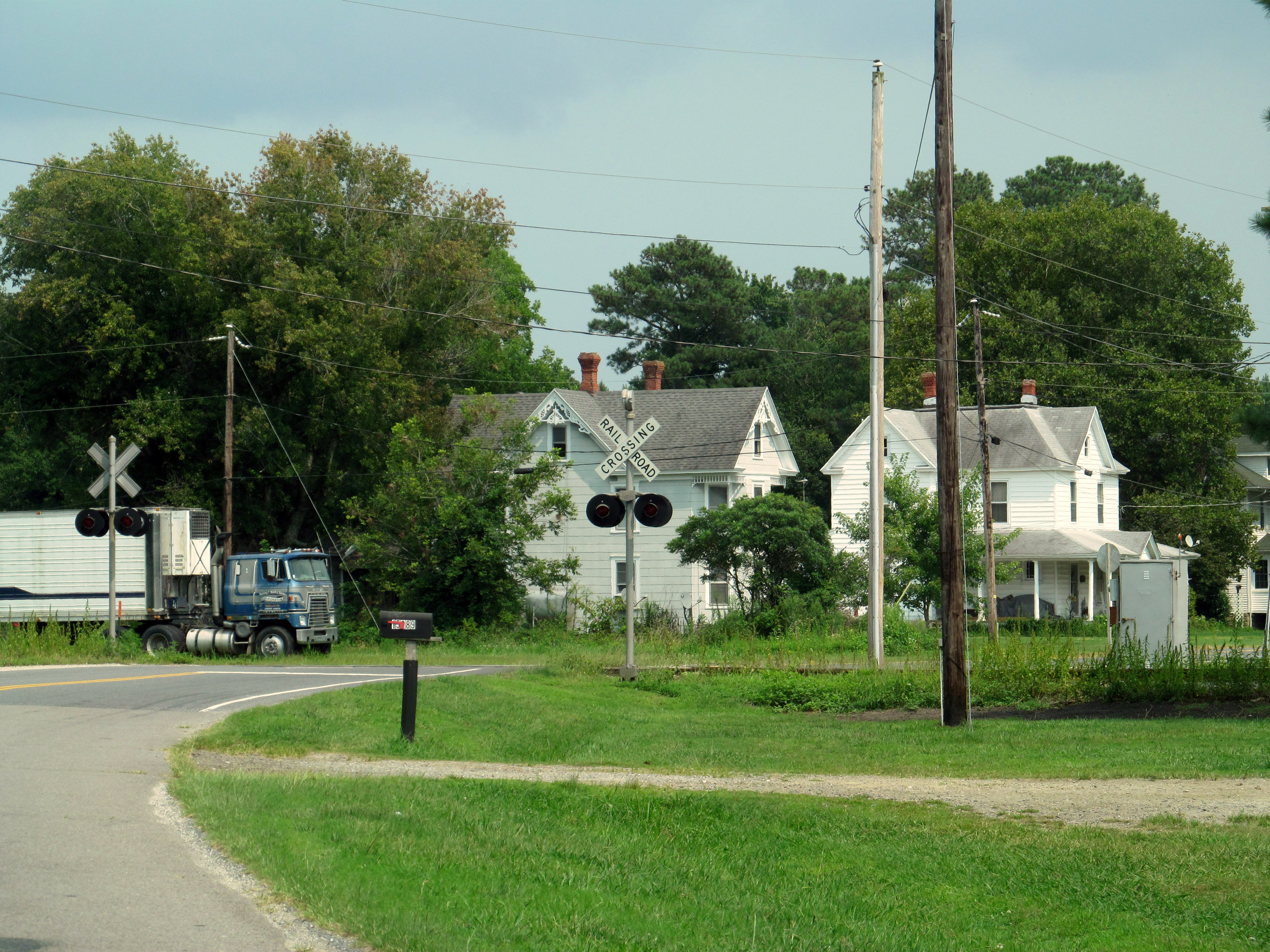
A railroad crossing in Horsey, Virginia

Horsey is an unincorporated community in Accomack County, Virginia, United States.
