= Horse Island, County Kerry =

Island in Ireland

Coordinates: 51°48′34″N 10°15′50″W

Horse Island (Gaeilge: Oileán Capall) is a presently uninhabited island in County Kerry, Ireland, located close to Portmagee between the mainland and Valentia Island. It is owned by the McGill family.

== Demographics ==
Historical population

| Year | Pop. | ±% |
|---|---|---|
| 1841 | 0 | — |
| 1851 | 20 | — |
| 1861 | 17 | −15.0% |
| 1871 | 13 | −23.5% |
| 1881 | 13 | +0.0% |
| 1891 | 12 | −7.7% |
| 1901 | 13 | +8.3% |
| 1911 | 17 | +30.8% |

| Year | Pop. | ±% |
|---|---|---|
| 1926 | 19 | +11.8% |
| 1936 | 16 | −15.8% |
| 1946 | 14 | −12.5% |
| 1951 | 13 | −7.1% |
| 1956 | 12 | −7.7% |
| 1961 | 0 | −100.0% |
| 1966 | 0 | 0.00% |
| 1971 | 0 | 0.00% |

| Year | Pop. | ±% |
|---|---|---|
| 1979 | 0 | 0.00% |
| 1981 | 0 | 0.00% |
| 1986 | 0 | 0.00% |
| 1991 | 0 | 0.00% |
| 1996 | 0 | 0.00% |
| 2002 | 0 | 0.00% |
| 2006 | 0 | 0.00% |

Source: Central Statistics Office. "CNA17: Population by Off Shore Island, Sex and Year". CSO.ie.
