= Simclar Group =

- Defunct: June 2011
- Fate: Assets acquired by Balmoral Funds; Simclar renamed Concurrent Manufacturing Solutions
- Owner: Sam Russell

The Simclar Group was a collection of companies owned by Sam Russell. It went into administration in June 2011.

In January 2007 the group closed its Kilwinning and Irvine plants amid allegations of asset stripping and abuse of workers rights.

Workers occupied the group's premises at Kilwinning and picketed the Irvine plant in an attempt to stop the asset stripping, but were unsuccessful. In August 2007, the workers were awarded approximately £800,000 in compensation for breaches of employment law by the Simclar Group.

In November 2012, the Simclar assets were acquired by Balmoral Funds, which renamed the company Concurrent Manufacturing Solutions.
