= Horse Island (Michigan) =

Island in Michigan

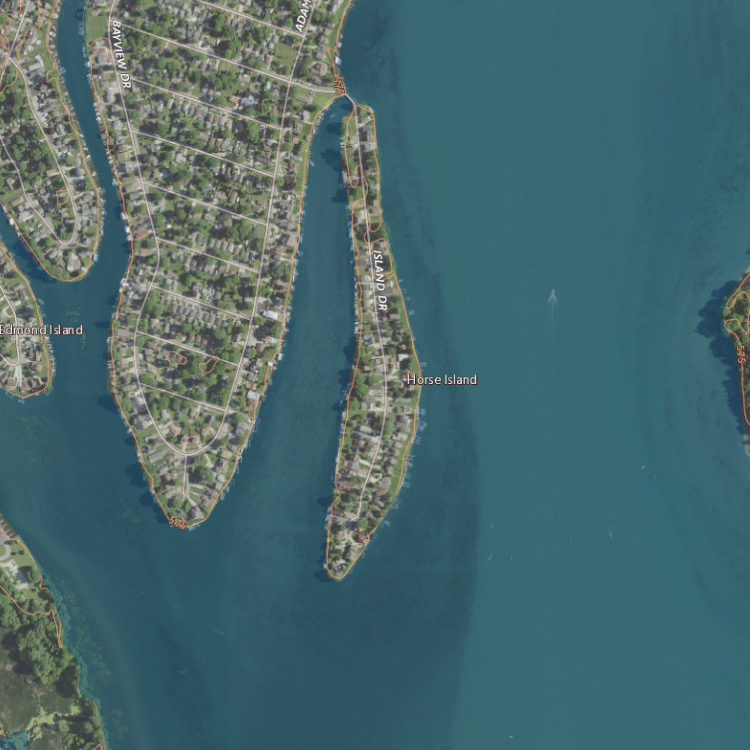
- USGS aerial imagery of Horse Island

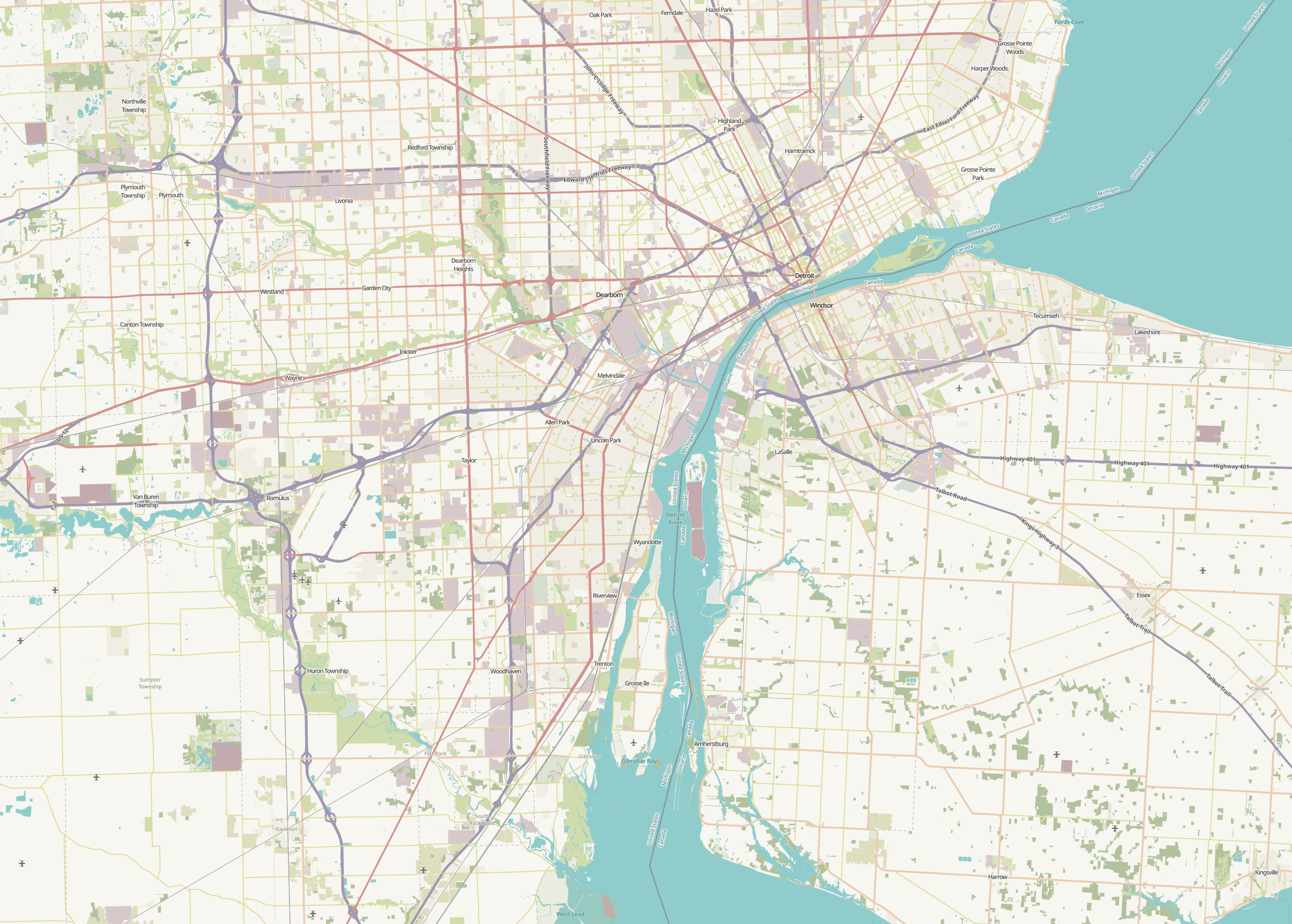
- Location within Wayne County, Michigan Location within Michigan Location within the United States

Geography
- Location: Michigan
- Coordinates: 42°04′55″N 83°11′06″W
- Highest elevation: 571 ft (174 m)

Administration
- United States
- State: Michigan
- County: Wayne

Horse Island is an island in the Detroit River, in southeast Michigan. It is in Wayne County. Its coordinates are 42°04′55″N 83°11′06″W, and the United States Geological Survey gave its elevation as 571 ft (174 m) in 1980. Walleye can be caught there.
