= Stevenston (ward) =

Electoral ward in North Ayrshire

- North Ayrshire
- Boundary of Stevenston in North Ayrshire from 2017–2022.
- Electorate: 9,565 (2017)
- Major settlements: Stevenston
- Scottish Parliament constituency: Cunninghame South
- Scottish Parliament region: West Scotland
- UK Parliament constituency: North Ayrshire and Arran

2017–2022
- Number of councillors: 3
- Replaced by: Saltcoats and Stevenston
- Created from: Saltcoats and Stevenston

Stevenston was one of the 10 electoral wards of North Ayrshire Council. Created in 2017 following the Fifth Statutory Reviews of Electoral Arrangements, the ward elected three councillors using the single transferable vote electoral system. As a result of the Islands (Scotland) Act 2018, the ward was abolished in 2022.

The area was a Labour stronghold after the only election in 2017 returned two Labour and one Scottish National Party (SNP) councillors.

== Boundaries ==
The ward was created following the Fifth Statutory Reviews of Electoral Arrangements ahead of the 2017 Scottish local elections. This was the first review after the introduction of the single transferable vote electoral system in 2007. Stevenston was one of three new wards created in North Ayrshire as the total number of councillors was increased to more evenly balance electoral parity in the region. The ward centered around the town of Stevenston in the southwest of the council area. It was formed from the eastern half of the Saltcoats and Stevenston ward which was abolished as part of the review.

In 2018, the Scottish Parliament passed the Islands (Scotland) Act 2018 which included provisions to improve the representation of island communities on councils. As a result, an intermediate review of the boundaries in North Ayrshire was carried out. The review coincided with the introduction of the Scottish Elections (Reform) Act 2020 which allowed for the creation of five-member wards. This proposed the abolition of the Stevenston ward with the area it represented placed into a re-established five-member Saltcoats and Stevenston ward. The proposals for North Ayrshire were subsequently approved by the Scottish Parliament and the ward was abolished in 2022.

== Councillors ==
Year	Councillors		
2017	Davina McTiernan (SNP)	John Sweeney (Labour)	Jimmy Miller (Labour/ Ind.)
2022	Davina McTiernan (SNP)	John Sweeney (Labour)	Jimmy Miller (Labour/ Ind.)

== Election results ==
=== 2017 election ===
Stevenston - 3 seats
Party	Candidate	FPv%	Count							
Party	Candidate	FPv%	1	2	3	4	5	6	7	8
SNP	Davina McTiernan	21.5	782	790	808	826	1,373			
Labour	John Sweeney	19.1	697	707	748	818	844	924		
SNP	Chris Paton	16.5	601	605	620	630				
Labour	Jimmy Miller (Note: In 2022, Cllr Jimmy Miller resigned from Labour and became an independent.)	15.9	579	592	604	636	654	736	744	961
Conservative	Tom McCammont	15.7	573	587	603	631	639	657	658	
Independent	Alan Munro (Note: Sitting councillor for Saltcoats and Stevenston ward.)	4.7	172	192	230					
Independent	Gerard Pollock	3.9	144	164						
Independent	David Higgins	2.7	97							
Electorate: 9,565 Valid: 3,645 Spoilt: 133 Quota: 912 Turnout: 39.5%
