= Arran (ward) =

Electoral ward in North Ayrshire

- North Ayrshire
- Population: 4,649 (2021)
- Electorate: 4,034 (2024)
- Major settlements: Brodick
- Scottish Parliament constituency: Cunninghame North
- Scottish Parliament region: West Scotland
- UK Parliament constituency: North Ayrshire and Arran

Current ward
- Created: 2022
- Number of councillors: 1
- Councillor: Charles Currie (Labour)
- Created from: Ardrossan and Arran

1974–2007
- Number of councillors: 1
- Replaced by: Ardrossan and Arran

Arran is one of the nine electoral wards of North Ayrshire Council. Re-established in 2022, the ward elects one councillor using the single transferable vote electoral system and covers an area with a population of 4,649 people.

== Boundaries ==
The Arran ward was first created in 1974 by the Formation Electoral Arrangements for Cunninghame District Council from the previous Corrie and Brodick, Lamlash, Whiting Bay, Southend, Shedog and Lochranza electoral divisions of Bute County Council. The ward centres around the Isle of Arran and includes the Holy Isle and the uninhabited island of Pladda. The boundaries remained largely unchanged following the Initial Statutory Reviews of Electoral Arrangements in 1979 and the Second Statutory Reviews of Electoral Arrangements in 1994. After the implementation of the Local Government etc. (Scotland) Act 1994, the boundaries proposed by the second review became the Formation Electoral Arrangements for the newly created North Ayrshire Council – a unitary authority for the area previously under Cunninghame District Council. Again, the boundaries were unchanged following the Third Statutory Reviews of Electoral Arrangements in 1998. In 2007, the ward was abolished as the Local Governance (Scotland) Act 2004 saw proportional representation and new multi-member wards introduced. Arran was combined with mainland wards and placed into the new Ardrossan and Arran ward. The Islands (Scotland) Act 2018 allowed for the creation of single- and dual-member wards to better represent island communities. As a result, the 2019 Reviews of Electoral Arrangements saw the re-establishment of a ward for Arran with the same boundaries as before.

== Councillors ==
Year	Councillor
2022	Timothy Billings (Conservative)
2024	Charles Currie (Labour)

== Election results ==
=== 2024 by-election ===
Arran by-election (12 September 2024) - 1 seat
Party	Candidate	FPv%	Count				
Party	Candidate	FPv%	1	2	3	4	5
Labour	Charles Currie	45.4	748	751	754	778	910
Independent	James Andrew McMaster	24.4	402	405	416	442	543
Scottish Green	Neil Alexander Wilkonson	20.6	340	342	343	354	
Conservative	Mackenzie Smith	5.5	90	92	112		
Reform UK	Carole Thomson	3.3	55	55			
Liberal Democrats	Matt Taylor	0.7	12				
Electorate: 4,034 Valid: 1,647 Spoilt: 21 Quota: 824 Turnout: 41.3%

=== 2022 election ===
Arran - 1 seat
Party	Candidate	FPv%	Count					
Party	Candidate	FPv%	1	2	3	4	5	6
Conservative	Timothy Billings (Note: Sitting councillor for Ardrossan and Arran.)	32.4	788	820	872	891	1,038	1,335
SNP	Steve Garraway	25.7	625	662	689	825	951	
Independent	Tom Young	12.5	305	375	436	519		
Labour	Aaran McDonald	9.9	243	260				
Scottish Green	Ronna Park	9.9	241	272	321			
Independent	Ellen McMaster	9.4	229					
Electorate: 4,072 Valid: 2,431 Spoilt: 23 Quota: 1,216 Turnout: 60.3%

=== 2003 election ===
Arran
Party	Candidate	Votes	%	±%
Conservative	Margaret Currie	1,105	46.3	▲17.1
Labour	John Sillars	782	32.8	▼9.8
SNP	James Lees	266	11.2	▼16.9
Scottish Socialist	Isla Blair	232	9.7	New
Majority		323	13.5	N/A
Turnout		2,385	61.4	▼4.9
Registered electors		3,884		
Conservative gain from Labour		Swing	▲13.4	

=== 1999 election ===
Arran
Party	Candidate	Votes	%	±%
Labour	John Sillars	1,090	42.6	▼7.4
Conservative	Cameron Robertson	747	29.2	▲3.0
SNP	James Lees	719	28.1	▲7.8
Majority		343	13.4	▼10.4
Turnout		2,556	66.3	▲11.4
Registered electors		3,884		
Labour hold		Swing	▼5.2	

=== 1995 election ===
Arran
Party	Candidate	Votes	%	±%
Labour	John Sillars	1,010	50.0	▲10.2
Conservative	Thomas Knox	529	26.2	▼17.3
SNP	Malcolm Kerr	410	20.3	▲3.7
Liberal Democrats	John Roberts	71	3.5	New
Majority		481	23.8	N/A
Turnout		2,020	54.9	▲3.7
Registered electors		3,586		
Labour gain from Conservative		Swing	▲10.2	

=== 1992 election ===
Arran
Party	Candidate	Votes	%	±%
Conservative	T. Knox	799	43.5	New
Labour	J. Sillars	731	39.8	▲7.4
SNP	M. Lunan	304	16.6	New
Majority		68	3.7	N/A
Turnout		1,834	51.2	▼0.3
Registered electors		3,586		
Conservative gain from Independent		Swing	▲43.5	

=== 1988 election ===
Arran
Party	Candidate	Votes	%	±%
Independent	E. Sillars	1,148	66.2	▼7.9
Labour	J. Sillars	562	32.4	▲7.9
Majority		586	33.8	▼15.8
Turnout		1,710	51.5	▲6.6
Registered electors		3,366		
Independent hold		Swing	▼7.9	

=== 1984 election ===
Arran
Party	Candidate	Votes	%	±%
Independent	E. Sillars	1,100	74.1	▼0.7
Labour	J. Sillars	363	24.5	▲0.9
Majority		737	49.6	▼0.6
Turnout		1,463	44.9	▼0.9
Registered electors		3,306		
Independent hold		Swing	▼0.3	

=== 1980 election ===
Arran
Party	Candidate	Votes	%
Independent	E. Sillars	1,095	74.8
Labour	W. Wallace	345	23.6
Majority		750	51.2
Turnout		1,440	45.8
Registered electors		3,194	
Independent hold			

=== 1977 election ===
Arran
Party	Candidate	Votes	%
Independent	E. Sillars	Unopposed	
Registered electors		2,942	
Independent hold			

=== 1974 election ===
Arran
Party	Candidate	Votes	%
Independent	E. Sillars	740	45.8
SNP	G. Glen	461	28.5
Independent	D. McNiven	415	25.7
Majority		279	17.3
Turnout		1,616	59.1
Registered electors		2,743	
Independent win (new seat)			
