= Garnock Valley =

Valley in North Ayrshire, Scotland

Coordinates: 55.732°N 4.690°W

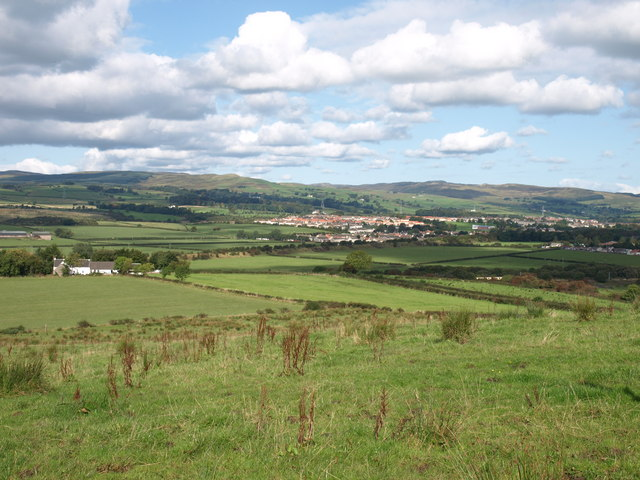
Garnock Valley

Garnock Valley (Scottish Gaelic: Srath Gairneig) is an area in the northern part of North Ayrshire, Scotland, adjoining Renfrewshire.

The region includes the towns of Beith, Dalry, and Kilbirnie, and some smaller villages such as Gateside, Barrmill, Longbar and Glengarnock; with a combined population of around 20,000.

== See also ==
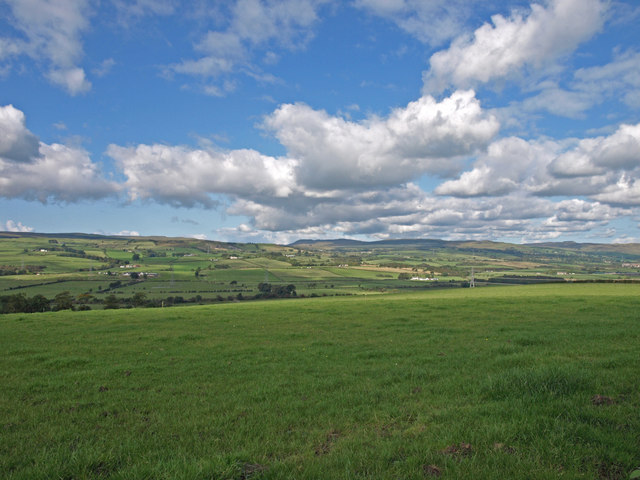
Garnock Valley

- River Garnock
