= Horse Isle =

Island in North Ayrshire, Scotland

Coordinates: 55.64482°N 4.84436°W

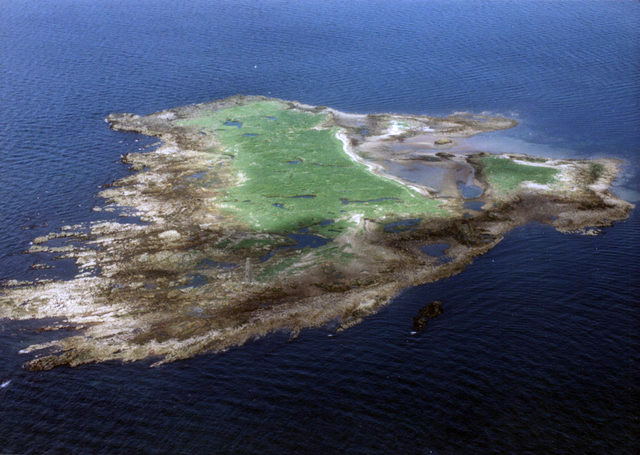
An aerial view of Horse Isle

Horse Isle (Scottish Gaelic: Eilean nan Each) is an uninhabited island located in the Firth of Clyde, Scotland near the seaside town of Ardrossan. It is a nature reserve, run by the RSPB.

== Etymology ==
Numerous, local stories exist regarding the origin of the island’s name. Most of these folk etymologies concern horses — being grazed on the island, disembarked there (putatively to avoid import tax) or swimming to safety upon the island following a shipwreck. Another story unconvincingly claims the island’s outline resembles a horse.

In fact the island was originally known as Horssey’s Island and the name dates from the twelfth century when Richard de Morville, Lord of Cunninghame, gifted the estate of Warrix (now Bourtreehill) in the Parish of Dreghorn to his son-in-law Philip de Horssey and included the small island, some thirteen miles to the north west, within the terms of the endowment.

== Geography ==
The small, rocky island lies at NS211427, around 1 km (1/2 mi) west of the North Ayrshire town of Ardrossan. Although no higher than 4 m (13 ft), it provides some shelter to Ardrossan harbour. The Arran ferry passes close to the island.

Two smaller islands, North Islet and East Islet, skirt the east coast of Horse Isle and a number of other rocks litter the sound between the island and the mainland. The 1788 survey of the Montgomery or Eglinton Estates by John Ainslie was completed in 1791 and records the name 'Robinson's Rock' off the East Islet and "Witherow's Rock" off the West side of the main island.

== History ==
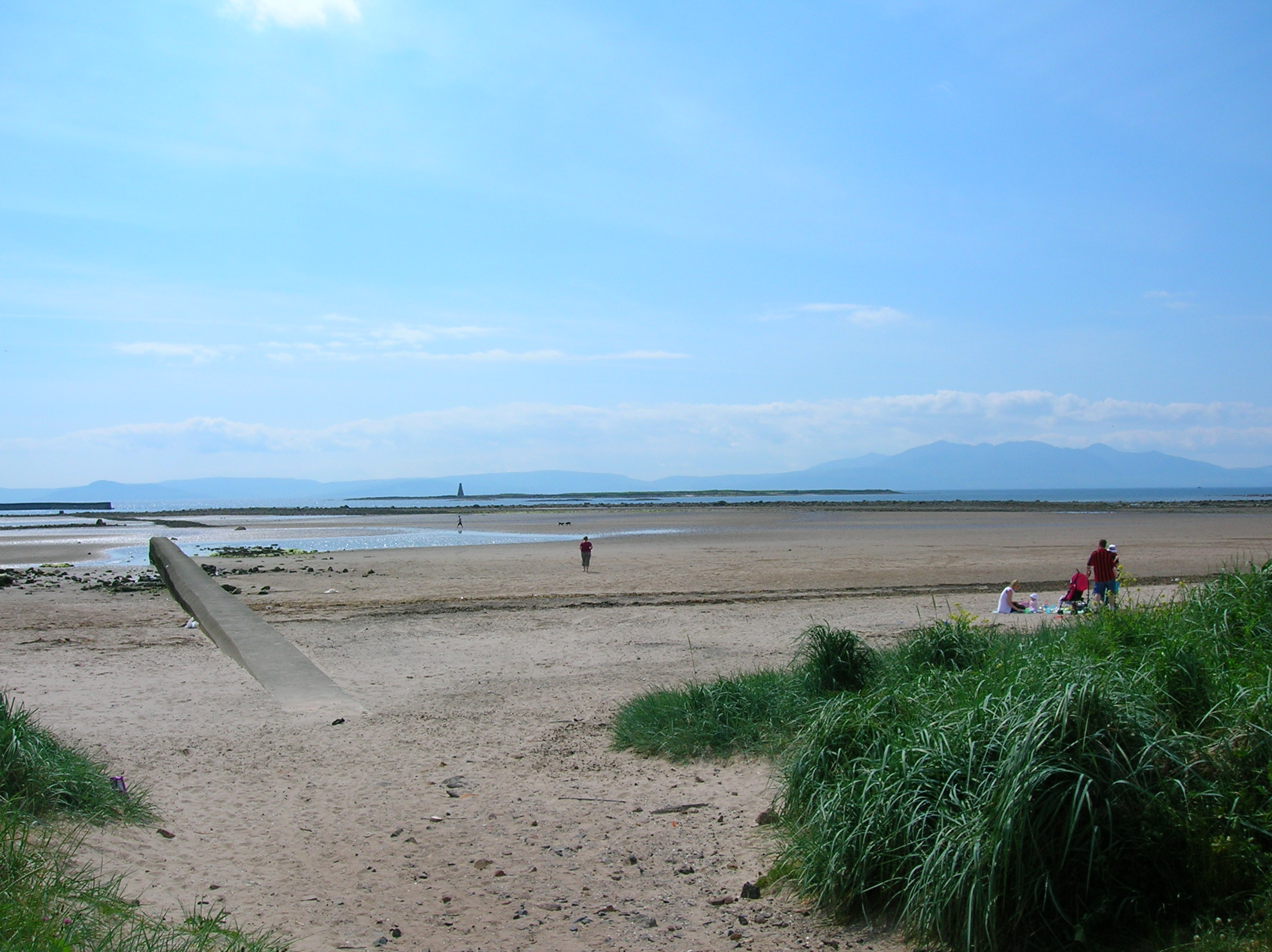
Horse Isle from Ardrossan North Beach

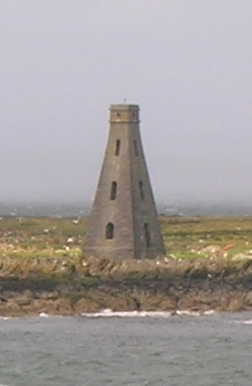
The beacon on Horse Isle

A 16-metre-tall (52 ft) stone beacon stands at the south end of Horse Isle marking the island for shipping. Erected in 1811, it was commissioned by Hugh, 12th Earl of Eglinton on the suggestion of John Ross. It is indicated only by the word "landmark" on the Ordnance Survey map.

The hazard the island continued to present to shipping is reflected in fact that in excess of 17 ships have been wrecked on or near the island including:

- Minerva, a brig, on route from Dublin to Glasgow, was wrecked on a reef off Horse Isle, with the loss of five of the eight people on board, one crew, a soldier, two women and a child drowned, 18 December 1821;
- Morning Star of Dublin, blown on to Horse Isle from the south-west during a gale, crew rescued, 1 January 1871;
- Brigadier (formerly the Empire Frank), a tug, stranded on the south side of Horse Isle, 21 February 1960.

== Wildlife ==
Today, Horse Isle is a nature reserve, run by the Royal Society for the Protection of Birds (RSPB). It is designated as an Area of Special Protection (AoSP). for breeding seabirds and waterfowl and winter grounds. AoSPs are created under the Wildlife and Countryside Act 1981 with the aim of preventing disturbance or destruction of birds. They replaced bird sanctuary orders (Protection of Birds Act 1967).

Horse Island is important for species including herring and lesser black backed gulls, and eider.

== See also ==
- Islands of the Clyde
- List of islands of Scotland
