= Cunninghame North (Scottish Parliament constituency) =

Region or constituency of the Scottish Parliament

- County constituency for the Scottish Parliament
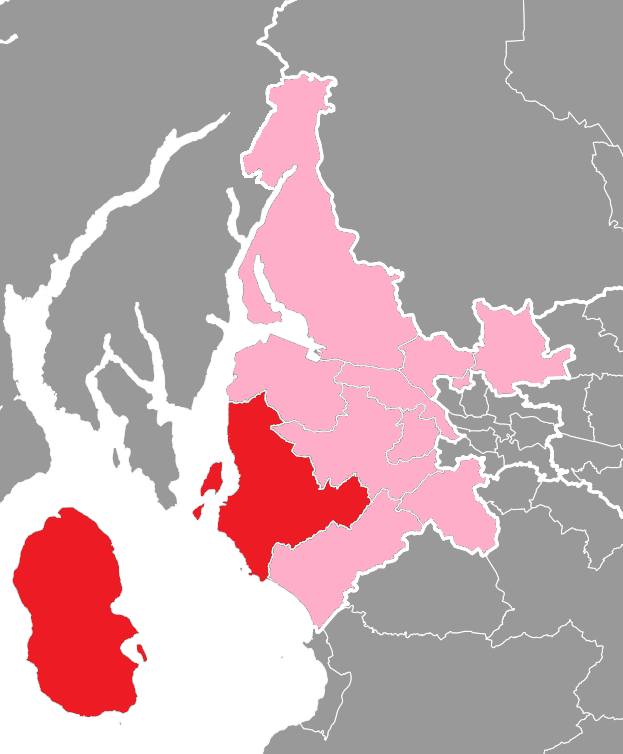

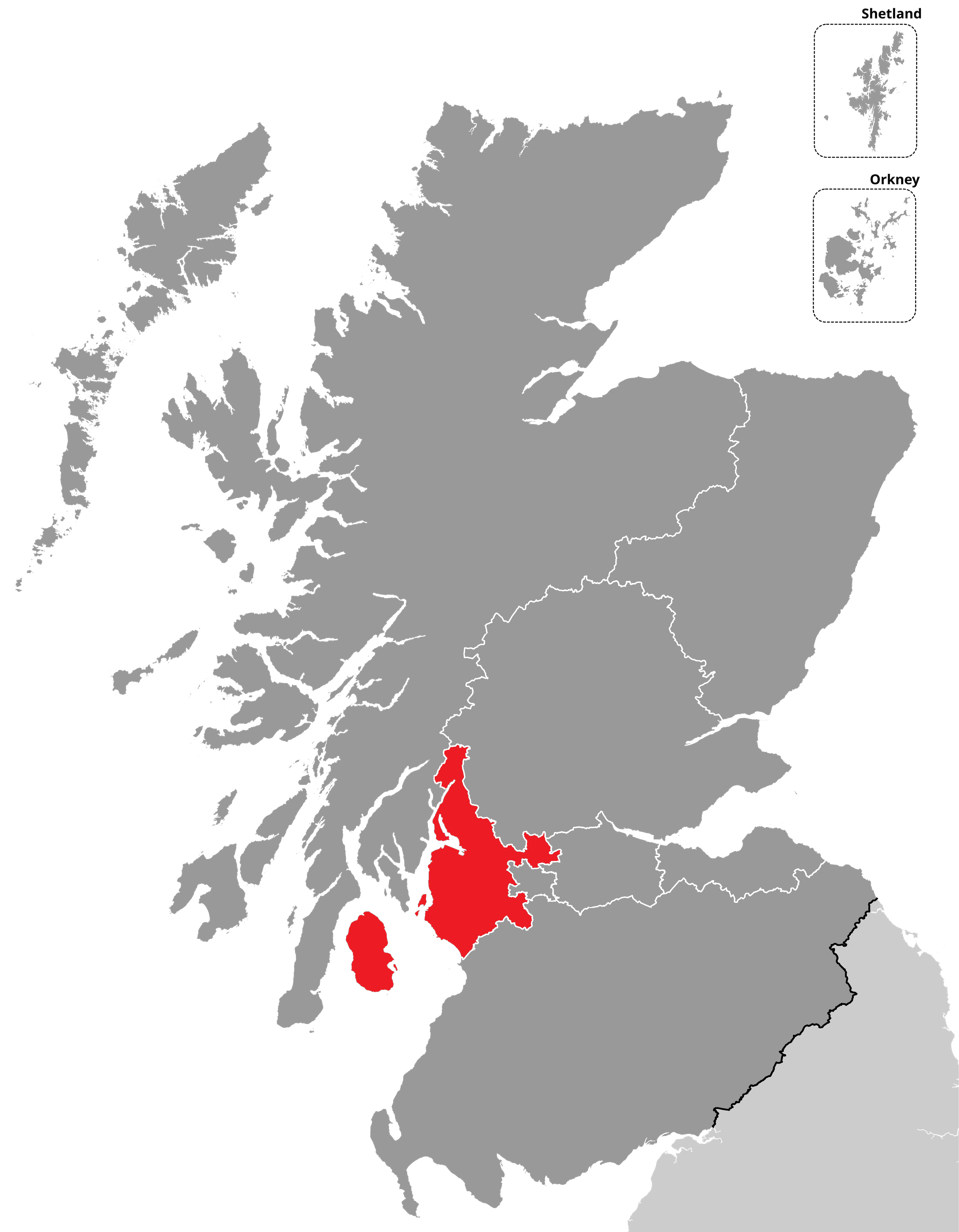
- Cunninghame North shown within the West Scotland electoral region and the region shown within Scotland
- Electoral region: West Scotland
- Electorate: 56,614 (2026)

Current constituency
- Created: 1999
- Party: Presiding Officer (elected as SNP)
- MSP: Kenneth Gibson
- Council area: North Ayrshire

Cunninghame North (Gaelic: Coineagan a Tuath) is a county constituency of the Scottish Parliament covering part of the council area of North Ayrshire. Under the additional-member electoral system used for elections to the Scottish Parliament, it elects one Member of the Scottish Parliament (MSP) by the first past the post method of election. It is also one of ten constituencies in the West Scotland electoral region, which elects seven additional members, in addition to the ten constituency MSPs, to produce a form of proportional representation for the region as a whole.

First contested at the 1999 Scottish Parliament election, the seat was affected by minor boundary changes ahead of the 2011 Scottish Parliament election, but was left unchanged at the Second Periodic Review of Scottish Parliament Boundaries in 2025 ahead of the 2026 Scottish Parliament election.

It has been held by Kenneth Gibson of the Scottish National Party (SNP) since the 2007 Scottish Parliament election. Following the 2026 Scottish Parliament election Gibson was elected to serve as Presiding Officer of the Scottish Parliament, and has thus renounced all affiliation with the SNP for the duration of his term.

== Electoral region ==
The other nine constituencies of the West Scotland region are: Clydebank and Milngavie, Cunninghame South, Dumbarton, Eastwood, Inverclyde, Paisley, Renfrewshire North and Cardonald, Renfrewshire West and Levern Valley, and Strathkelvin and Bearsden. The region covers the whole of the council areas of East Dunbartonshire, East Renfrewshire, Inverclyde, North Ayrshire, Renfrewshire, and West Dunbartonshire; and parts of the council areas of Argyll and Bute, East Ayrshire, and Glasgow.

== Constituency boundaries and council area ==
Map of boundaries from 2011

Cunninghame North was created at the same time as the Scottish Parliament, for the 1999 Scottish Parliament election, using the name and boundaries of the existing UK House of Commons constituency. Ahead of the 2005 United Kingdom general election, however, constituencies for the House of Commons in Scotland were altered, and there is no longer any link between UK and Scottish Parliamentary boundaries. The Cunninghame North UK Parliament constituency was abolished at this point, whilst the Scottish Parliament constituency was retained. Following their First Periodic review into constituencies to the Scottish Parliament in time for the 2011 Scottish Parliament election, the Boundary Commission for Scotland altered the boundaries of the constituency. Boundaries were reviewed again in 2025 ahead of the 2026 election, however Cunninghame North was unaffected by this review.

The constituency is one of two in North Ayrshire, with the rest of the council area being covered by the Cunninghame South constituency. The electoral wards of North Ayrshire Council used in the current creation of Cunninghame North are:

- North Coast (entire ward)
- Garnock Valley (entire ward)
- Ardrossan (entire ward)
- Arran (entire ward)
- Saltcoats and Stevenston (shared with Cunninghame South)

== Constituency profile and voting patterns ==
=== Constituency profile ===
The Cunninghame North constituency covers a diverse mix of areas located towards the northern half of the North Ayrshire Council area, rising from the working class towns of Ardrossan and Saltcoats in the south-west up to the coastal towns of Fairlie, Skelmorlie, Largs and West Kilbride in the north-west. West of here, across the Firth of Clyde, sits the Island communities of Arran and Cumbrae, which are covered by the constituency. Along the east of the constituency is the more working-class Garnock Valley which comprises Kilbirnie, Beith and Dalry, towns which once specialised in the production of steel and textiles before the industries collapse across the 20th Century. The constituency is mostly working-class in nature, although this is contrasted by the affluence enjoyed in the more rural parts of the constituency and in areas such as Arran, Fairlie, Skelmorlie, West Kilbride and patches of Largs. The constituency returned a high unemployment rate of 6.4% at the 2011 census compared to the Scottish average of 4.8%.

=== Voting patterns ===
Throughout the early 20th Century Cunninghame North was a safe Unionist seat at the British Parliament, carried by the Scottish Unionists (and later the Scottish Conservatives) consistently as Bute and Northern Ayrshire from 1918 until the constituency's abolishment in 1983, where the newly established Cunninghame North seat was narrowly won by Conservative John Corrie with a majority of 4.1%. In 1987 the constituency went Labour with a majority of 10.4%, with the Conservatives gradually losing ground in the constituency, eventually falling behind the Scottish National Party in 2001. Since then the Westminster seat of Cunninghame North, later North Ayrshire and Arran, had consistently returned Labour MP's to the British Parliament until being won by the SNP in 2015 on a swing of 23.3%. At the Scottish Parliament the Cunninghame North constituency voted Labour in both 1999 and 2003 before being won by the SNP's Kenneth Gibson by 48 votes in 2007, with some stipulating that had a set of damaged and rejected ballots from the Isle of Arran been counted the result might have been a Labour hold. In 2011 and 2016 Kenneth Gibson managed to build upon his narrow majority, bringing him ahead by 27.3% in 2016 - where the Conservatives marginally overtook the Labour Party into second place in the constituency for the first time since 1983.

The Conservative Party derive most of their support from the affluent resort towns of West Kilbride, Fairlie, Skelmorlie and Largs along the north-west coast of the constituency, as well as from the Isle of Arran, and rural and suburban areas in Garnock Valley. The SNP are strongest in the more populated parts of the constituency, in the towns of Ardrossan, Saltcoats and Kilbirnie, as well as parts of Largs, Dalry and the Isle of Cumbrae. Dalry, Kilbirnie, Ardrossan and Saltcoats are historically stronger areas for the Labour Party which have since voted SNP.

== Members of the Scottish Parliament ==
Kenneth Gibson of the Scottish National Party presently holds this seat. With a majority of just 48 over Labour incumbent Allan Wilson at the 2007 election, this was the most marginal seat in Holyrood. However, at the 2011 election, Gibson increased his majority over the Labour candidate to a much healthier 6,117 and this further increased in 2016 to 8,724, his biggest to date at that time. His majority fell in the 2021 election.

| Election | Member | Party |
|---|---|---|
| 1999 | Allan Wilson | Labour |
| 2007 | Kenneth Gibson | SNP |
| 2026 | Kenneth Gibson | Presiding Officer |

== Election results ==

=== 2020s ===
2026 Scottish Parliament election: Cunninghame North
| Party | Candidate | Constituency | | | Regional | | |
| Party | Candidate | Votes | % | ±% | Votes | % | ±% |
|---|---|---|---|---|---|---|---|
| SNP | Kenneth Gibson (Note: Incumbent member for this constituency) | 11,814 | 39.2 | ▼9.8 | 8,480 | 28.0 | ▼13.6 |
| Labour | Matthew McGowan | 6,022 | 20.0 | ▼0.3 | 5,255 | 17.4 | ▲0.1 |
| Reform | Mike Mann | 5,404 | 17.9 | New | 5,854 | 19.3 | ▲19.1 |
| Conservative | Ronnie Stalker | 4,904 | 16.3 | ▼11.8 | 4,049 | 13.0 | ▼13.0 |
| Green | | | | | 3,459 | 11.4 | ▲4.8 |
| Liberal Democrats | Christine Murdoch | 1,592 | 5.3 | ▲2.7 | 1,516 | 5.0 | ▲2.8 |
| ADF | Ian Gibson | 411 | 1.4 | New | 123 | 0.4 | New |
| Scottish Family | | | | | 264 | 0.9 | ▲0.2 |
| AtLS | | | | | 254 | 0.8 | New |
| Independent Green Voice | | | | | 242 | 0.8 | ▲0.3 |
| ISP | | | | | 173 | 0.6 | New |
| Socialist Labour | | | | | 160 | 0.5 | New |
| Liberal | | | | | 134 | 0.4 | New |
| Scottish Socialist | | | | | 99 | 0.3 | New |
| Independent | William Wallace | | | | 94 | 0.3 | New |
| Independent | Paddy McCarthy | | | | 43 | 0.1 | New |
| UKIP | | | | | 27 | 0.1 | New |
| Scottish Common Party | | | | | 21 | 0.1 | New |
| Scottish Libertarian | | | | | 18 | 0.1 | ▼0.1 |
| Independent | Paul Mack | | | | 18 | 0.1 | New |
| Majority | | 5,792 | 19.2 | ▼1.7 | | | |
| Valid votes | | 30,147 | | | 30,283 | | |
| Invalid votes | | 155 | | | 80 | | |
| Turnout | | 30,302 | 53.5 | ▼11.2 | 30,363 | 53.6 | ▼11.1 |
| SNP hold | | Swing | | ▼4.8 | | | |
Notes

2021 Scottish Parliament election: Cunninghame North
| Party | Candidate | Constituency | | | Regional | | |
| Party | Candidate | Votes | % | ±% | Votes | % | ±% |
|---|---|---|---|---|---|---|---|
| SNP | Kenneth Gibson (Note: Incumbent member for this constituency) | 18,227 | 49.0 | ▼2.9 | 15,515 | 41.6 | ▼4.3 |
| Conservative | Jamie Greene (Note: Incumbent member on the party list, or for another constituency) | 10,451 | 28.1 | ▲3.5 | 9,814 | 26.3 | ▲1.5 |
| Labour | Katy Clark | 7,536 | 20.3 | ▼0.8 | 6,412 | 17.2 | ▼1.1 |
| Green | | | | | 2,477 | 6.6 | ▲2.0 |
| Liberal Democrats | Ruby Kirkwood | 967 | 2.6 | ▲0.2 | 828 | 2.2 | ▲0.2 |
| Alba | | | | | 816 | 2.2 | New |
| All for Unity | | | | | 445 | 1.2 | New |
| Scottish Family | | | | | 254 | 0.7 | New |
| Independent Green Voice | | | | | 198 | 0.5 | New |
| Abolish the Scottish Parliament | | | | | 132 | 0.4 | New |
| Reform | | | | | 83 | 0.2 | New |
| Freedom Alliance (UK) | | | | | 70 | 0.2 | New |
| UKIP | | | | | 60 | 0.2 | ▼1.8 |
| Scottish Libertarian | | | | | 47 | 0.1 | 0.0 |
| TUSC | | | | | 43 | 0.1 | New |
| Independent | Maurice Campbell | | | | 29 | 0.1 | New |
| Scotia Future | | | | | 21 | 0.1 | New |
| Independent | James Morrison | | | | 18 | 0.0 | New |
| Renew | | | | | 6 | 0.0 | New |
| Majority | | 7,776 | 20.9 | ▼6.4 | | | |
| Valid votes | | 37,181 | | | 37,268 | | |
| Invalid votes | | 162 | | | 80 | | |
| Turnout | | 37,343 | 64.7 | ▲7.0 | 37,348 | 64.7 | ▲7.0 |
| SNP hold | | Swing | | | | | |

=== 2010s ===
2016 Scottish Parliament election: Cunninghame North
| Party | Candidate | Constituency | | | Region | | |
| Party | Candidate | Votes | % | ±% | Votes | % | ±% |
|---|---|---|---|---|---|---|---|
| SNP | Kenneth Gibson (Note: Incumbent member for this constituency) | 16,587 | 51.9 | ▼0.7 | 14,703 | 45.9 | ▼1.1 |
| Conservative | Jamie Greene | 7,863 | 24.6 | ▲10.9 | 7,951 | 24.8 | ▲10.7 |
| Labour | Johanna Baxter | 6,735 | 21.1 | ▼10.8 | 5,861 | 18.3 | ▼8.9 |
| Green | | | | | 1,488 | 4.6 | ▲1.8 |
| Liberal Democrats | Charity Pierce | 780 | 2.4 | ▲0.6 | 641 | 2.0 | 0.0 |
| UKIP | | | | | 656 | 2.0 | ▲1.2 |
| Scottish Christian | | | | | 272 | 0.8 | ▼0.1 |
| RISE | | | | | 219 | 0.7 | New |
| Solidarity | | | | | 216 | 0.7 | ▲0.6 |
| Scottish Libertarian | | | | | 39 | 0.1 | New |
| Majority | | 8,724 | 27.3 | ▲6.6 | | | |
| Valid votes | | 31,965 | | | 32,046 | | |
| Invalid votes | | 156 | | | 51 | | |
| Turnout | | 32,121 | 57.7 | ▲5.2 | 32,097 | 57.7 | ▲5.2 |
| SNP hold | | Swing | | | | | |
Notes

2011 Scottish Parliament election: Cunninghame North
| Party | Candidate | Constituency | | | Region | | |
| Party | Candidate | Votes | % | ±% | Votes | % | ±% |
|---|---|---|---|---|---|---|---|
| SNP | Kenneth Gibson (Note: Incumbent member for this constituency) | 15,539 | 52.6 | N/A | 13,914 | 47.0 | N/A |
| Labour | Allan Wilson | 9,422 | 31.9 | N/A | 8,050 | 27.2 | N/A |
| Conservative | Maurice Golden | 4,032 | 13.7 | N/A | 4,160 | 14.1 | N/A |
| Liberal Democrats | Malika Punukollu | 543 | 1.8 | N/A | 583 | 2.0 | N/A |
| Green | | | | | 833 | 2.8 | N/A |
| All-Scotland Pensioners Party | | | | | 679 | 2.3 | N/A |
| Scottish Christian | | | | | 278 | 0.9 | N/A |
| Socialist Labour | | | | | 268 | 0.9 | N/A |
| BNP | | | | | 236 | 0.8 | N/A |
| UKIP | | | | | 224 | 0.8 | N/A |
| Scottish Socialist | | | | | 123 | 0.6 | N/A |
| Ban Bankers Bonuses | | | | | 117 | 0.4 | N/A |
| Pirate | | | | | 87 | 0.3 | N/A |
| Solidarity | | | | | 28 | 0.1 | N/A |
| Independent | Richard Vassie | | | | 23 | 0.1 | N/A |
| Majority | | 6,117 | 20.7 | N/A | | | |
| Valid votes | | 29,536 | | | 29,603 | | |
| Invalid votes | | 126 | | | 112 | | |
| Turnout | | 29,662 | 52.5 | N/A | 29,715 | 52.5 | N/A |
| SNP win (new boundaries) | | | | | | | |

=== 2000s ===
In the 2007 election, the high number of rejected votes was particularly significant in Cunninghame North as the majority (48) was far smaller than the number of rejected papers (over 1,000). Additionally, ballot papers carried by boat from the Isle of Arran were damp when they arrived, raising suggestions they may not have been transported securely. There were also questions about a discrepancy in the number of ballot papers that left Arran and the number that arrived at the count, though the returning officer later announced that a manual recount found no discrepancy. Allan Wilson, the former member for Cunninghame North, was said to be discussing with his solicitor a potential legal challenge to the Cunninghame North result but no election petition was lodged.

2007 Scottish Parliament election: Cunninghame North
| Party | Candidate | Votes | % | ±% |
|---|---|---|---|---|
| SNP | Kenneth Gibson | 9,295 | 30.7 | +3.6 |
| Labour | Allan Wilson | 9,247 | 30.6 | −8.3 |
| Conservative | Philip Lardner | 5,466 | 18.1 | −1.3 |
| Independent | Campbell Martin | 4,423 | 14.6 | N/A |
| Liberal Democrats | Lewis Hutton | 1,810 | 6.0 | −2.2 |
| Majority | | 48 | 0.1 | N/A |
| Turnout | | 30,241 | | |
| SNP gain from Labour | | Swing | | |

2003 Scottish Parliament election: Cunninghame North
| Party | Candidate | Votes | % | ±% |
|---|---|---|---|---|
| Labour | Allan Wilson | 11,142 | 38.9 | −4.0 |
| SNP | Campbell Martin | 7,755 | 27.1 | −1.5 |
| Conservative | Peter Ramsay | 5,542 | 19.4 | −0.6 |
| Liberal Democrats | John Boyd | 2,333 | 8.2 | −0.5 |
| Scottish Socialist | Sean Scott | 1,859 | 6.5 | New |
| Majority | | 3,387 | 11.8 | −2.5 |
| Turnout | | 28,631 | 51.8 | −8.2 |
| Labour hold | | Swing | | |

=== 1990s ===
1999 Scottish Parliament election: Cunninghame North
| Party | Candidate | Votes | % | ±% |
|---|---|---|---|---|
| Labour | Allan Wilson | 14,369 | 42.90 | N/A |
| SNP | Kay Ullrich | 9,573 | 28.58 | N/A |
| Conservative | Mike Johnston | 6,649 | 19.85 | N/A |
| Liberal Democrats | Calum Irving | 2,900 | 8.66 | N/A |
| Majority | | 4,796 | 14.32 | N/A |
| Turnout | | 33,491 | 60.0 | |
| Labour win (new seat) | | | | |

== See also ==
- Cunninghame North (UK Parliament constituency)
