= North Ayrshire and Arran =

UK Parliament constituency (since 2005)

Coordinates: 55.637°N 4.915°W

- County constituency for the House of Commons
- Interactive map of boundaries from 2005
- Boundary of North Ayrshire and Arran within Scotland
- Subdivision: North Ayrshire
- Electorate: 73,588 (March 2020)
- Major settlements: Ardrossan, Dalry, Kilwinning, Largs, Saltcoats, Stevenston, Kilbirnie, Beith

Current constituency
- Created: 2005
- Member of Parliament: Irene Campbell (Labour)
- Created from: Cunninghame North

North Ayrshire and Arran is a constituency of the British House of Commons, located in the south-west of Scotland within the North Ayrshire council area. It elects one Member of Parliament (MP) at least once every five years using the first-past-the-post voting system of voting.

Once a longtime Conservative stronghold, the area had been represented by Labour MPs from 1987 until 2015. Patricia Gibson, held the seat as an SNP member from 2015 to 2024. In 2024 the seat was won by Irene Campbell of Labour.

It contains the towns of Largs, Fairlie and West Kilbride to the north, as well as the towns of Ardrossan, Kilbirnie, the Garnock Valley, Kilwinning, Saltcoats and Stevenston to the south. The Isle of Arran and Great Cumbrae are also within the constituency.

== Boundaries ==
The constituency was created by the Fifth Review of UK Parliament constituencies for the 2005 general election and is entirely within the North Ayrshire council area. Part of the same council area is covered by the Central Ayrshire constituency.

The constituency boundaries were defined in accordance with the ward structure in place on 30 November 2004. Under the 2023 review of Westminster constituencies, which came into effect for the 2024 general election, the boundaries were unchanged.

Further to reviews of local government ward boundaries which came into effect in 2007 and 2017, but did not affect the parliamentary boundaries, the contents of the constituency are now defined as comprising the following wards or part wards of North Ayrshire Council, as they existed on 1 December 2020:

- In full: Stevenston, Ardrossan and Arran, Dalry and West Kilbride, Kilbirnie and Beith, North Coast and Cumbraes, Saltcoats.
- In part: Kilwinning (all except small area in southeast of ward).

The boundaries of North Ayrshire and Arran extend to, and include, Skelmorlie in the north of the council area, Stevenston in the south, Beith in the east, and the islands of Arran and Cumbrae in the west.

== Constituency profile ==
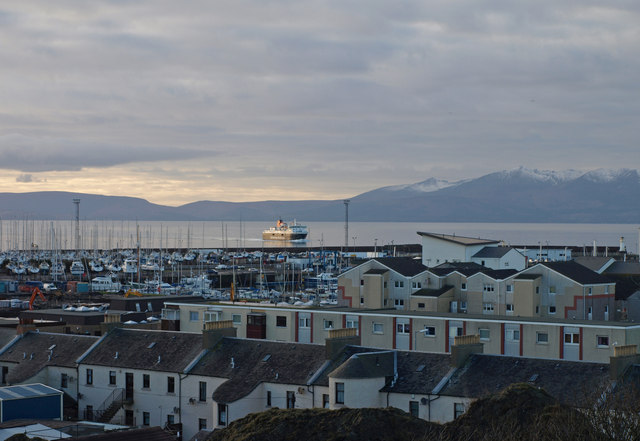
A view of Ardrossan

The seat takes in many towns and villages which have some very affluent areas and more working class areas, The towns of Skelmorlie, Largs, Fairlie and West Kilbride in the north are affluent commuter towns, while Ardrossan, Saltcoats, and Stevenston in the south are rather more industrial, However, regeneration is taking place at Ardrossan Harbour and there has been a rapid increase in new build housing in recent years. Inland, the seat takes in the Garnock valley towns of Dalry, Beith and Kilbirnie, once a centre of steel and textile production long since gone. Tourism is the main industry on Arran and Cumbrae, however the number of holiday homes on the latter has begun to squeeze locals out of the housing market. The seat has two nuclear power stations, Hunterston A nuclear power station (currently being decommissioned) and Hunterston B nuclear power station, as well as a windfarm at Ardrossan. Kilwinning which is North Ayrshire's second largest town in the south of the constituency has many very affluent areas as well as working class areas but while the constituency maybe seen as working class as a whole, It is considered mixed due to the wealthy and working class areas within it

== History ==
The constituency of North Ayrshire was created in 1868 and was much larger than the present constituency, as it also included the towns of Irvine and Kilmarnock. It returned various Liberal, Liberal Unionist and Conservative MP's, the most well known of whom being Sir Aylmer Hunter-Weston, a general in the First World War who served as MP from 1916 to 1935 first for North Ayrshire and then for Bute and Northern Ayrshire which was created in 1918. Another well-known MP was Sir Fitzroy Maclean, a major-general in the Second World War who was rumoured to be one of Ian Fleming's inspirations for James Bond.

In 1983, the Cunninghame North constituency was created. From 1911 to 1987, the constituencies containing north Ayrshire returned either Conservative Party or Unionist Party MP's until the 1987 general election when the constituency was lost to the Labour Party. Labour held the seat until the 2015 general election when it was won by the SNP. In the 2017 general election the SNP held the seat with a much reduced majority, with the Conservatives more than doubling their vote share, but this was partially reversed in 2019. At the 2024 election, Labour recaptured the seat from third place, as both the SNP and Conservative vote share slumped.

== Members of Parliament ==
Election	Member	Party
2005	Katy Clark	Labour
2015	Patricia Gibson	SNP
2024	Irene Campbell	Labour

== Election results ==
=== Elections in the 2020s ===
General election 2024: North Ayrshire and Arran
Party	Candidate	Votes	%	±%
Labour	Irene Campbell	16,821	39.8	+25.9
SNP	Patricia Gibson	13,270	31.4	−17.1
Conservative	Todd Ferguson	5,954	14.1	−16.7
Reform	Michael Mann	3,415	8.1	New
Green	Cara McKee	1,327	3.1	+0.8
Liberal Democrats	Gillian Cole-Hamilton	1,005	2.4	−2.0
SDP	Ian Gibson	238	0.6	New
Socialist Labour	James McDaid	232	0.5	New
Majority		3,551	8.4	N/A
Turnout		42,262	58.6	−6.8
Registered electors		72,176		
Labour gain from SNP		Swing	+21.5	

=== Elections in the 2010s ===
General election 2019: North Ayrshire and Arran
Party	Candidate	Votes	%	±%
SNP	Patricia Gibson	23,376	48.5	+9.6
Conservative	David Rocks	14,855	30.8	−0.4
Labour	Cameron Gilmore	6,702	13.9	−13.6
Liberal Democrats	Louise Young	2,107	4.4	+2.0
Green	David Nairn	1,114	2.3	New
Majority		8,521	17.7	+10.0
Turnout		48,154	65.5	+0.7
SNP hold		Swing	+5.0	

General election 2017: North Ayrshire and Arran
Party	Candidate	Votes	%	±%
SNP	Patricia Gibson	18,451	38.9	−14.3
Conservative	David Rocks	14,818	31.2	+16.4
Labour	Christopher Rimicans	13,040	27.5	−0.5
Liberal Democrats	Mark Dickson	1,124	2.4	+0.7
Majority		3,633	7.7	−17.5
Turnout		47,433	64.8	−6.3
SNP hold		Swing	−15.4	

General election 2015: North Ayrshire and Arran
Party	Candidate	Votes	%	±%
SNP	Patricia Gibson	28,641	53.2	+27.3
Labour	Katy Clark	15,068	28.0	−19.4
Conservative	Jamie Greene	7,968	14.8	−0.8
UKIP	Sharon McGonigal	1,296	2.4	New
Liberal Democrats	Ruby Kirkwood	896	1.7	−8.3
Majority		13,573	25.2	N/A
Turnout		53,869	71.1	+9.6
SNP gain from Labour		Swing	+23.3	

General election 2010: North Ayrshire and Arran
Party	Candidate	Votes	%	±%
Labour	Katy Clark	21,860	47.4	+3.5
SNP	Patricia Gibson	11,965	25.9	+7.9
Conservative	Philip Lardner	7,212	15.6	−2.8
Liberal Democrats	Gillian Cole-Hamilton	4,630	10.0	−6.4
Socialist Labour	Louise McDaid	449	1.0	+0.3
Majority		9,895	21.5	−4.1
Turnout		46,116	61.5	+1.6
Labour hold		Swing		

==== 2010 general election Campaign ====
The Conservative Party candidate Philip Lardner was dropped as their official candidate and suspended from his job (but later reinstated) as a Primary School teacher following comments he had made, in which he described homosexuality as "not normal behaviour". As nominations for candidates had closed, however, the Conservatives were unable to replace him. In 2008 he had previously been suspended as a candidate for the same seat by the Conservatives over claims he made racist remarks, but was later reinstated as the candidate for this seat and exonerated by the Party. Lardner is recorded by the BBC as an "Independent", due to him being "disowned" by the Conservative Party prior to polling day, however, on the actual ballot paper he was still described as a "Scottish Conservatives & Unionist".

Percentage vote change and percentage swing for the 2005 results are based on notional results on how this constituency would have performed in the 2001 UK General Election.

=== Elections in the 2000s ===
General election 2005: North Ayrshire and Arran
Party	Candidate	Votes	%	±%
Labour	Katy Clark	19,417	43.9	−4.5
Conservative	Stewart Connell	8,121	18.4	+0.9
SNP	Tony Gurney	7,938	18.0	−3.0
Liberal Democrats	George White	7,264	16.4	+7.6
Scottish Socialist	Colin Turbett	780	1.8	−1.4
UKIP	John Pursley	382	0.9	New
Socialist Labour	Louise McDaid	303	0.7	−0.5
Majority		11,296	25.6	−1.9
Turnout		44,205	59.9	−0.8
Labour hold		Swing	−2.7	
