= List of listed buildings in South Ayrshire =

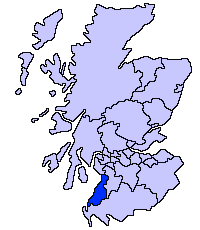
South Ayrshire shown within Scotland

This is a list of listed buildings in South Ayrshire. The list is split out by parish.

- List of listed buildings in Ayr, South Ayrshire
- List of listed buildings in Ballantrae, South Ayrshire
- List of listed buildings in Barr, South Ayrshire
- List of listed buildings in Colmonell, South Ayrshire
- List of listed buildings in Coylton, South Ayrshire
- List of listed buildings in Craigie, South Ayrshire
- List of listed buildings in Dailly, South Ayrshire
- List of listed buildings in Dundonald, South Ayrshire
- List of listed buildings in Girvan, South Ayrshire
- List of listed buildings in Kirkmichael, South Ayrshire
- List of listed buildings in Kirkoswald, South Ayrshire
- List of listed buildings in Maybole, South Ayrshire
- List of listed buildings in Monkton And Prestwick, South Ayrshire
- List of listed buildings in Prestwick, South Ayrshire
- List of listed buildings in Straiton, South Ayrshire
- List of listed buildings in Symington, South Ayrshire
- List of listed buildings in Tarbolton, South Ayrshire
- List of listed buildings in Troon, South Ayrshire

== See also ==
- Scheduled monuments in South Ayrshire
