= List of castles in South Ayrshire =

This is a list of castles in South Ayrshire, Scotland.

== List ==
| Name | Type | Date | Condition | Ownership | Location | Notes | Picture |
|---|---|---|---|---|---|---|---|
| Ardstinchar Castle | | | Ruin | Private | Ballantrae | Mary Queen of Scots once stayed here | |
| Auchans Castle | Tower House | 17th century | Ruin | Private | Dundonald; NS3548034599 | Onetime home to Lady Susanna Montgomerie and visited by Dr Samuel Johnson & James Boswell | A view from the south-east of Auchans Castle |
| Baltersan Castle | | | Ruin | | | | |
| Barnweill Castle | | 13th century | Moat only | Private | Craigie | The remains of Barnweill Church lie nearby | Remains of Barnweill Castle |
| Blairquhan Castle | Historic house | 1824 | Occupied | Private | NS3653105468 | | |
| Carleton Castle | Tower castle | 15th century | Ruin | Private | Lendalfoot | Held by the Cathcarts of Killochan | Carlton Castle |
| Cassillis Castle | Keep | 15th century | Occupied | Private | Minishant | One time home of the Cassillis family | The keep of Cassillis Castle |
| Craigie Castle | Keep | 13th century | Ruin | | Craigie; NS4084831699 | One time home of the Wallace family | The keep of Craigie Castle |
| Crosbie Castle | Keep | 14th century | Ruin | South Ayrshire Council | Troon | Demolished by the Fullarton of Fullarton family and made into an ice house | Ruins of Crosbie Castle, Troon |
| Culzean Castle | Historic house | 1792 | Preserved | National Trust for Scotland | NS2325410253 | Incorporates an older tower house | |
| Dalquharran Castle (old) | | 15th century | Ruin | | Dailly | | |
| Dalquharran Castle (new) | | 1785 | Ruin | | Dailly | | |
| Dundonald Castle | | | Ruin | Historic Scotland | Dundonald; NS3637234511 | | |
| Dunduff Castle | L-shaped Tower | Circa 1696 | Restored | Private | Dunure; NS2719216370 | Held by the Stewarts and then the Whitefords | Dunduff Castle from the south |
| Dunure Castle | Keep | 15th century | Ruin | Marquess of Ailsa | Dunure; NS250158 | | |
| Fail Castle | Tower | 16th century | Sparse remains | Private | Tarbolton; NS4212928654 | Modified part of Fail Monastery | |
| Gadgirth Castle | Tower | 14th Century | Demolished | Private | Annbank | Mansion house was built on the site | |
| Gadgirth Old Ha' | Tower | Prior to 14th Century | Sparse remains | Private | Annbank | Replaced by Gadgirth Castle that was demolished in 1808. Held by the Chalmer family | |
| Glenapp Castle | | | Occupied | | NX0935480711 | | |
| Greenan Castle | | | Ruin | | NS3118719324 | | |
| Killochan Castle | | 1581 | Occupied | | Near Girvan | | |
| Maybole Castle | | 1560 | Occupied | | Maybole | | |
| Penkill Castle | | 16th century | Occupied | | NX2315398535 | | |
| Sundrum Castle | | | Occupied | | NS4107421260 | | |
| Thomaston Castle | | | Ruin | | NS2399309532 | | |
| Turnberry Castle | | | Ruin | | NS1966507245 | | |

== See also ==
- Castles in Scotland
- List of castles in Scotland
- List of listed buildings in South Ayrshire
