= Andy Dunlop (footballer) =

Scottish footballer

Personal information
- Date of birth: 11 December 1957 (age 68)
- Place of birth: Ayr, Scotland
- Position: Centre-back

Youth career
- Dalry Boys Club

Senior career*
Years	Team	Apps	(Gls)
1976–81	St Mirren	56	(0)
1981–84	Partick Thistle	88	(4)
1984–85	Morton	9	(1)
1985–86	Annbank United		
1986–92	Glenafton Athletic		
Total		153	(5)
- * Club domestic league appearances and goals as of 15:37, 11 May 2017 (UTC)

Andrew Dunlop (born 11 December 1957) is a Scottish former professional footballer who played as a defender for St Mirren, Partick Thistle and Morton in the Scottish Football League Premier Division. He also made one appearance in the UEFA Cup for St Mirren against AS Saint-Étienne in 1980, the French side containing the likes of Patrick Battiston, Michel Platini and Johnny Rep.

After leaving Morton, Dunlop played Junior football in his native Ayrshire, firstly with Annbank United, before beginning a 23-year association with Glenafton Athletic as a player, assistant manager and coach. He was also co-manager with former Partick teammate Alan Rough during the Glens successful period in the 1990s. Dunlop was awarded a testimonial match against Kilmarnock in 2007 for his service and finally left the New Cumnock club in 2009.
