= List of listed buildings in Coylton, South Ayrshire =

This is a list of listed buildings in the parish of Coylton, in South Ayrshire, Scotland.

== List ==
Name	Location	Date Listed	Grid Ref. (Note: Sometimes known as OSGB36, the grid reference (where provided) is based on the British national grid reference system used by the Ordnance Survey. • "Guide to National Grid". Ordnance Survey. • "Get-a-map". Ordnance Survey.)	Geo-coordinates	Notes	LB Number (Note: Historic Environment Scotland assign a unique alphanumeric identifier to each designated site in Scotland, for listed buildings this always begins with "LB", for example "LB12345".)	Image
Parish Church				55°26′49″N 4°29′47″W	Category B	1064	Upload Photo
Fragments Of Previous Kirk In Old Graveyard				55°26′30″N 4°29′49″W	Category B	1065	Upload Photo
Sundrum Castle				55°27′33″N 4°30′54″W	Category B	1068	Upload Photo
Gadgirth Mains				55°28′12″N 4°30′58″W	Category C(S)	4895	Upload Photo
The Cushats, Bridge In Policies				55°27′38″N 4°30′05″W	Category C(S)	4897	Upload Photo
Sundrum Mains				55°27′15″N 4°31′05″W	Category B	44606	Upload Photo
Manse, Manse Road				55°26′36″N 4°29′36″W	Category B	1066	Upload Photo
Knockshoggle				55°28′31″N 4°29′58″W	Category B	1067	Upload Photo
Oswald's Bridge				55°28′29″N 4°33′10″W	Category B	1069	Upload Photo
The Cushats, Including Coach House And Stable Block And Garage				55°27′37″N 4°30′21″W	Category C(S)	4896	Upload Photo
Bogside				55°25′57″N 4°29′22″W	Category B	106	Upload Photo

== Key ==
The scheme for classifying buildings in Scotland is:

- Category A: "buildings of national or international importance, either architectural or historic; or fine, little-altered examples of some particular period, style or building type."
- Category B: "buildings of regional or more than local importance; or major examples of some particular period, style or building type, which may have been altered."
- Category C: "buildings of local importance; lesser examples of any period, style, or building type, as originally constructed or moderately altered; and simple traditional buildings which group well with other listed buildings."

In March 2016 there were 47,288 listed buildings in Scotland. Of these, 8% were Category A, and 50% were Category B, with the remaining 42% being Category C.
