= Girvan Steeple =

Municipal building in Girvan, Scotland

Stumpy Jail
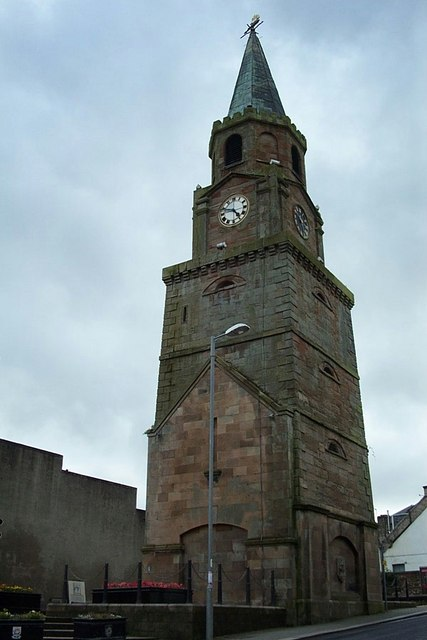
- Girvan Steeple

- Shown in South Ayrshire
- 55.2432°N 4.8560°W
- Location: Knockcushan Street, Girvan

History
- Built: 1778

Site notes
- Architectural style: Neoclassical style

Listed Building – Category B
- Official name: Knockcushan Street Town Hall Tower
- Designated: 8 May 1980
- Reference no.: LB32148

The Girvan Steeple is a steeple and the site of a former townhouse in Girvan, South Ayrshire, Scotland. Its popular name, "Stumpy Tower", "Stumpy Jail" or "Auld Stumpy", is derived from the Gaelic Olladh Stiom Paidh, meaning "Great Circle of Justice". (The name of Knockcushan Street, upon which the tower sits, means "Hill [or Knoll] of Justice".) It is a Category B listed building.

== History ==
An earlier tower was erected on the corner of Knockcushan Street and Dalrymple Street in 1787. However, by the mid-1820s it was very dilapidated and on 14 January 1825, it was agreed by a meeting of the burgesses to "rebuild the two houses on the Town's property adjoining the King's Arms and erect, another house on the front leading to the shore, and also a Gaol and Steeple adjoining the present market house to complete the square".

The construction of the new townhouse and steeple, as well as the three new houses, was undertaken by local builders, Denham, Davidson and McWhinnie, at a cost £1,633 and was completed in 1827. The design involved a two-storey townhouse and adjacent four-stage steeple facing onto Knockcushan Street. The steeple was steeply battered and incorporated bands between the stages; it was surmounted by a smaller clock stage, an octagonal belfy, a spire and a weather vane. Internally, the principal rooms in the townhouse were the prison on the ground floor and a meeting room for the burgh council on the first floor. The bell for the belfry was cast by Stephen Miller & Co of Glasgow and the clock was presented by Sir John Hamilton-Dalrymple, 5th Baronet. The building was a prominent landmark, the tower being 29 metres (95 ft) tall.

The prison was inspected in 1835 by the prisons inspector who reported that "a marked improvement in the peace of the town is said to have followed the building of this prison".

In 1908, the townhouse demolished to make way for the McMaster Hall, of which construction began in 1909 and took two years to complete, before it opened on 17 August 1911. The McMaster Hall was a gift to the town from John McMaster, a local banker who came from Kirkoswald but who was residing in Canterbury. The McMaster Hall was primarily a town hall, accommodating burgh council meetings and also serving as a dance hall. In 1939 the McMaster Hall was destroyed by fire, leaving only the tower still standing.

The burgh council was subsequently based at 17 Dalrymple Street (now occupied by a Bank of Scotland Branch).

== See also ==
- List of listed buildings in Girvan, South Ayrshire
