= Castle and Barony of Gadgirth =

Place in South Ayrshire, Scotland

- Gadgirth, Annbank, South Ayrshire, Scotland
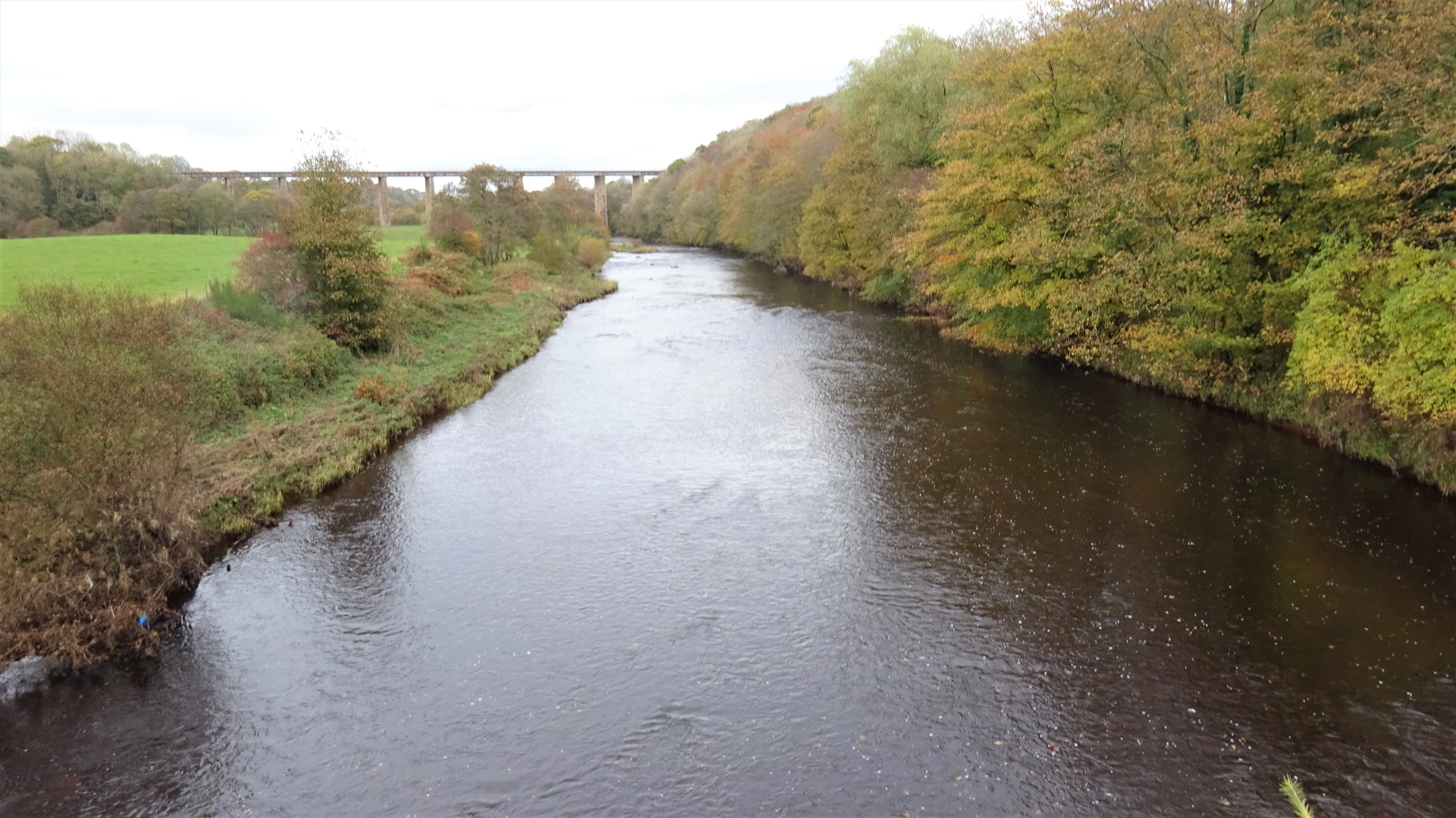
- The River Ayr from Gadgirth Bridge with Gadgirth Woods and Viaduct

Site information
- Type: Castle
- Owner: Private land
- Open to the public: No
- Condition: Demolished and replaced by Gadgirth House

Location
- Coordinates: 55.468732°N 4.5184681°W
- Grid reference: grid reference NS408223

Site history
- Built: 14th century
- Built by: Chalmer
- Materials: Masonry

The Castle and Barony of Gadgirth was held by the Chalmer family, originally De Camera, with successive castles and a mansion house overlooking the River Ayr at the border of the Parish of Coylton, the old district of Kyle, now part of South Ayrshire, Scotland.

== History ==
=== The Barons of Gadgirth ===
Reginaldus de Camera, later Chalmer, is recorded to have held the Barony of Gadgirth as a hereditary possession, during the reign of William the Lion (1165–1214). The family continued in residence until circa 1761 and in 1800 Colonel Joseph Burnett, retired from the East India Company, purchased part of the old barony, including Gadgirth and the Old Ha' Castles.

The name 'Chalmer' derives from the post of Lord or Great Chamberlain of Scotland, Camerarius Regii a position held by Herbert de Camera from 1124 to 1153, a member of the family who were of Saxon or Norman descent. In 1357 the 'Farthing Land of Gadgard (sic) is recorded its tithe and 50s as the assessed rent. The lands of Gaitgirth (sic) and Culreath were joined to form one Barony in 1468.

In 1424 John Chalmer of Gadgirth fought for King Charles VII of France against the English at the Battle of Vernuie and was awarded the right to use the Fleur de Lis in recognition of his gallantry. He is thought to have died at the Battle of Herrings in 1429.

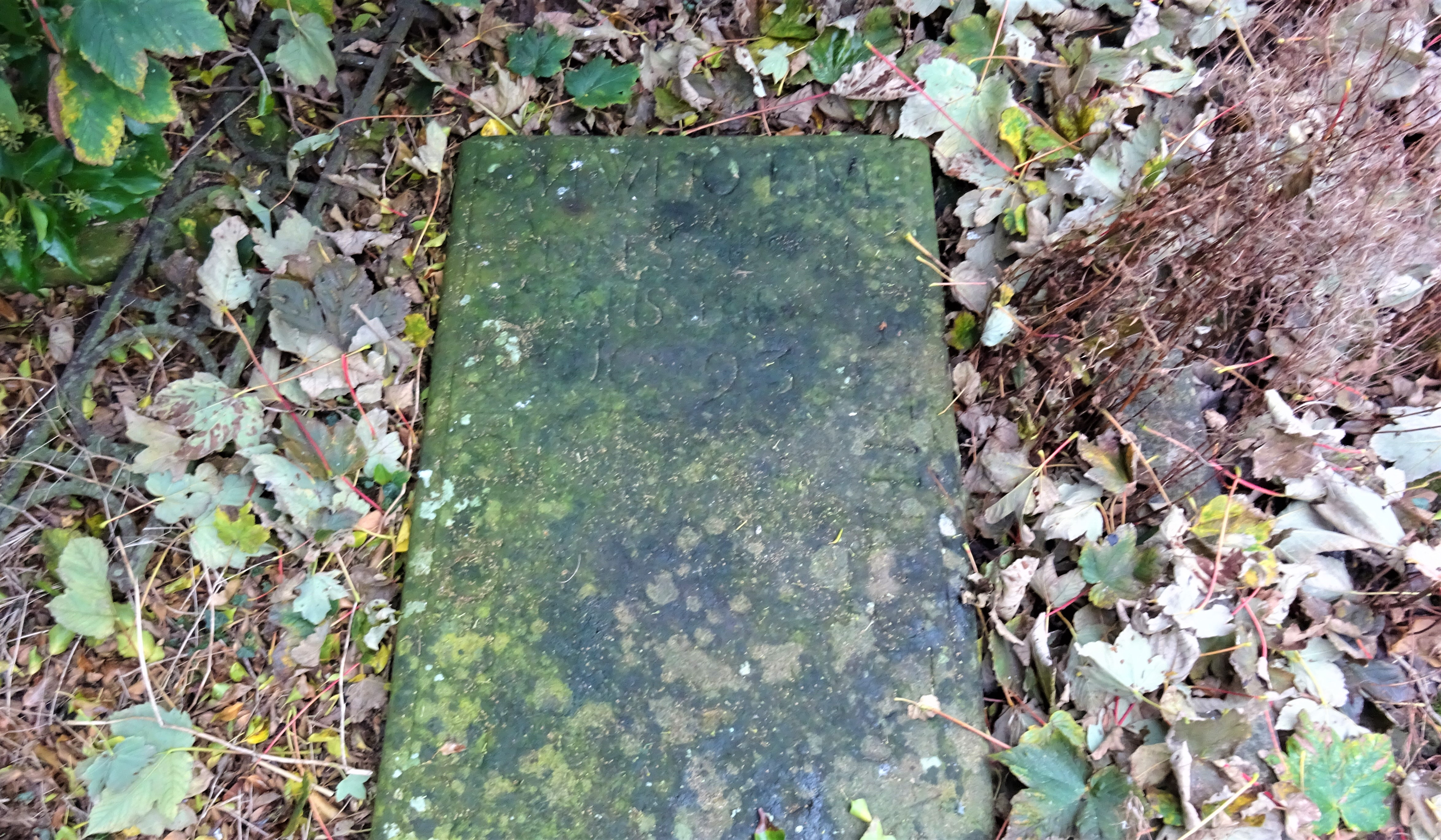
Gravestone of John or William Chalmer at Coylton, dated 1693

Sir John Chalmer's wife Elizabeth was charged before the King's Council in 1494 as an adherent to the Lollard's, a heretical doctrine promulgated by John Wycliffe. The charge was dismissed by King James IV.

James Chalmer of Gadgirth was a great supporter of the Scottish Reformation and was regarded by Archbishop Spottiswood and John Knox as one of the boldest of the leaders of the movement. In 1558, Mary of Guise, the Queen Regent, a supporter of the Catholic Church, was meeting with the Catholic bishops, when a delegation of reformers entered the privy chamber and James Chalmer addressed her, saying (in updated English) "Madam you know of the malice of the jail birds and that bastard that stands beside you (the bishop of St. Andrews). We swear to God we shall make a fight of it. They oppress us and our tenants, for feeding their idle bellies. They trouble our preachers, and intend to murder them and us. Shall we not put up with this any longer.” The reformers then put on their helmets as if they were about to use force. Mary quickly compromised with the reformers.

Annabelle Cunningham was the wife of James Chalmer and when she died in 1569 her will stated that "I do commend my spirit to Jesus Christ my onlie saviour and redeemer, in quhome and by quhome I luke for eternaljoy and felicite."

The laird of Gadgirth is recorded as having great misgivings relating to the economic control that the clergy had upon him and his tenants.

In 1696 Captain John Chalmers inherited the barony as a minor from his father John, however almost all of the lands had passed into others hands as a result of debts incurred as a result of the Chalmer family supporting King Charles I. John managed to restore some of the barony lands to Chalmer ownership however he died circa 1750 without a male heir and the property passed to his sisters Mary, Anna and Elizabeth.

Mary left her portion to her husband, John Steel of Gadgirth and his daughter by a second marriage, married Lieut-Colonel Joseph Burnett of the Bengal Artillery who purchased his sister-in-laws portion of the barony. James Muir, Elizabeth's eldest son, changed his name to Chalmer and inherited his aunt, Anna Chalmer's, portion of the barony.

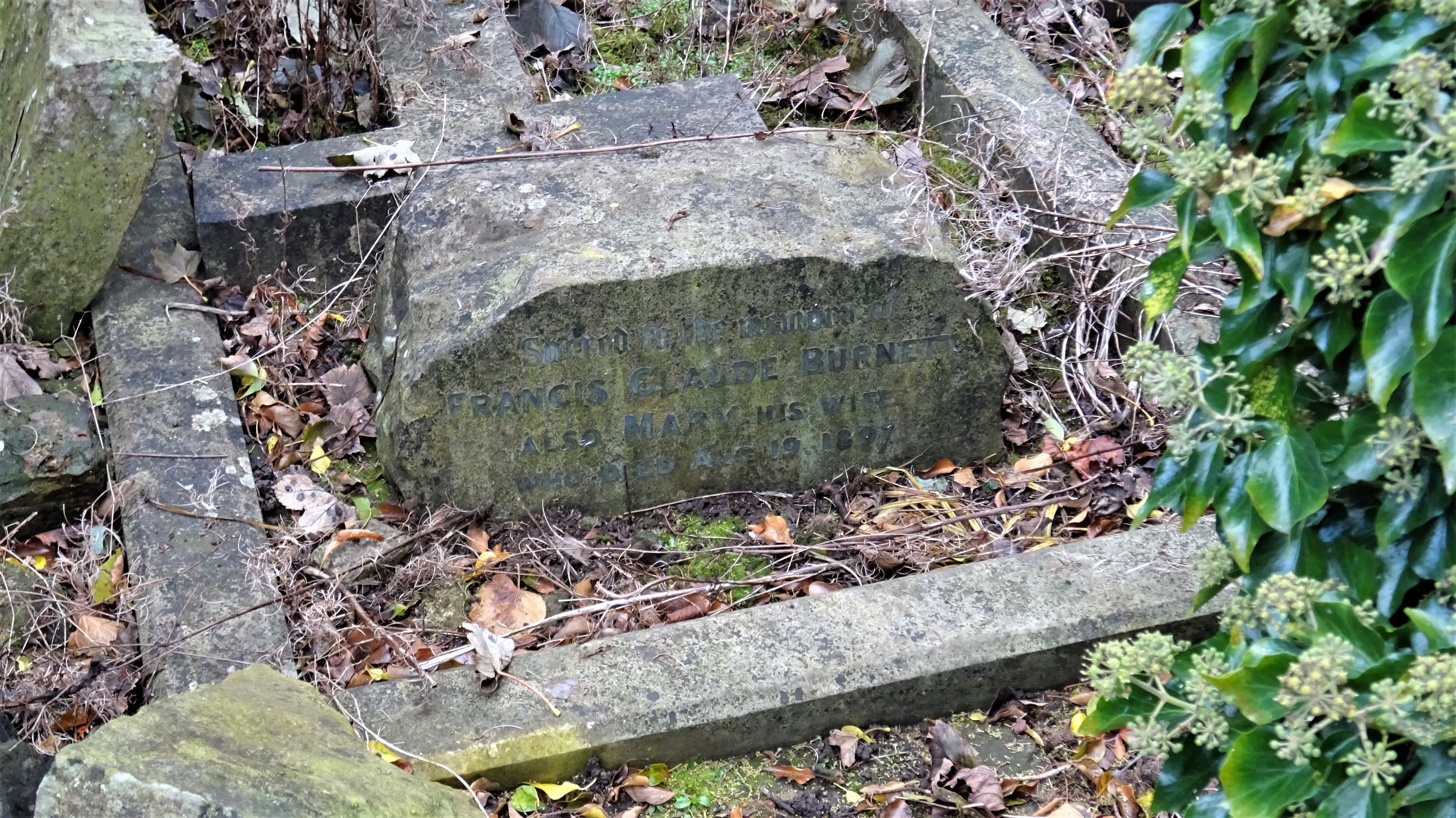
Grave of Francis Claude Burnett at Coylton old parish church

Joseph Burnett died in 1833 and his son John Joseph Burnett inherited however he never married and the barony passed to his brother Lieut-Colonel Francis Claude Burnett of the Bengal Artillery who died on August 19, 1897. He was buried with his wife Mary in the family mausoleum at the Coylton Kirk cemetery.

The Chalmer's were connected through marriage with many families in Ayrshire and elsewhere, such as the Campbells of Loudoun, Hamiltons of Cadzow, Cuninghames of Caprington, Wallace of Ellerslie, Craufurd of Craufurdland, Fergusson of Craigdarroch, Farquhar of Gilmilnscroft, etc.

The Chalmer of Gadgirth coat of arms is Argent, a demi-lion rampant, Sable, issuing out of a Fess, and in base, a Fleur-de-Lis: all within a border, Gules. Crest - a falcon, belled, proper. Motto - Non Praeda sed Victoria (Not spoiled by victory).

The Burnett of Gadgirth coat of arms is Argent. Crest - A Holly Branch, green, with red berries. Shield - Three holly leaves on a white ground in the upper division; on the lower, a Hunting Horn. Motto - Nec Fluctu, nec Flatu (Neither by Wave nor Wind)..

=== Gadgirth Castle ===
The castle, probably a typical 14th century tower castle, replaced the earlier Gadgirth Old Ha' that stood around 500 metres or a quarter of a mile downstream on the same southern side of the River Ayr, abandoned when the new castle was built. Gadgirth Castle was itself demolished in 1808 when a new mansion house was built on its footprint by Colonel Joseph Burnett who had retired from his post with the East India Company. Joseph had intended to retain the castle however it proved to be unsuitable for modification with walls six feet thick. Extensive woodlands and a pale or fence are shown on Timothy Pont's map of the early 17th century indicating a deer park. A dwelling is shown on the 1775 Armstrong map that appears to indicate a house rather than a castle with planted woodlands and open parkland, with a road running to it via Enterkine and with a bridge across the River Ayr as confirmed by the dwelling named Bridgend. A print of 1892 by the artist Robert Bryden shows a castle that has been given some Georgian features such as regular windows and ornamental bartizan towers. It not known what source was used to create the print and therefore the accuracy of the image is unknown.

John Knox is known to have preached here dispensed the sacrament and Mary Queen of Scots is said to have stayed here for one night.

=== Gadgirth Old Ha' ===
As stated, the first castle, Gadgirth Old Ha', also lay on the southern side of the River Ayr near the B742 road that crosses the River Ayr at Gadgirth Bridge and runs up to Annbank. The castle jutted into the river on a rocky promontory with an islet located within the river at this point. The historian John Smith in the 1890s visited the site and recorded that even at that date only a short stretch of wall could be traced.

=== Gadgirth House ===
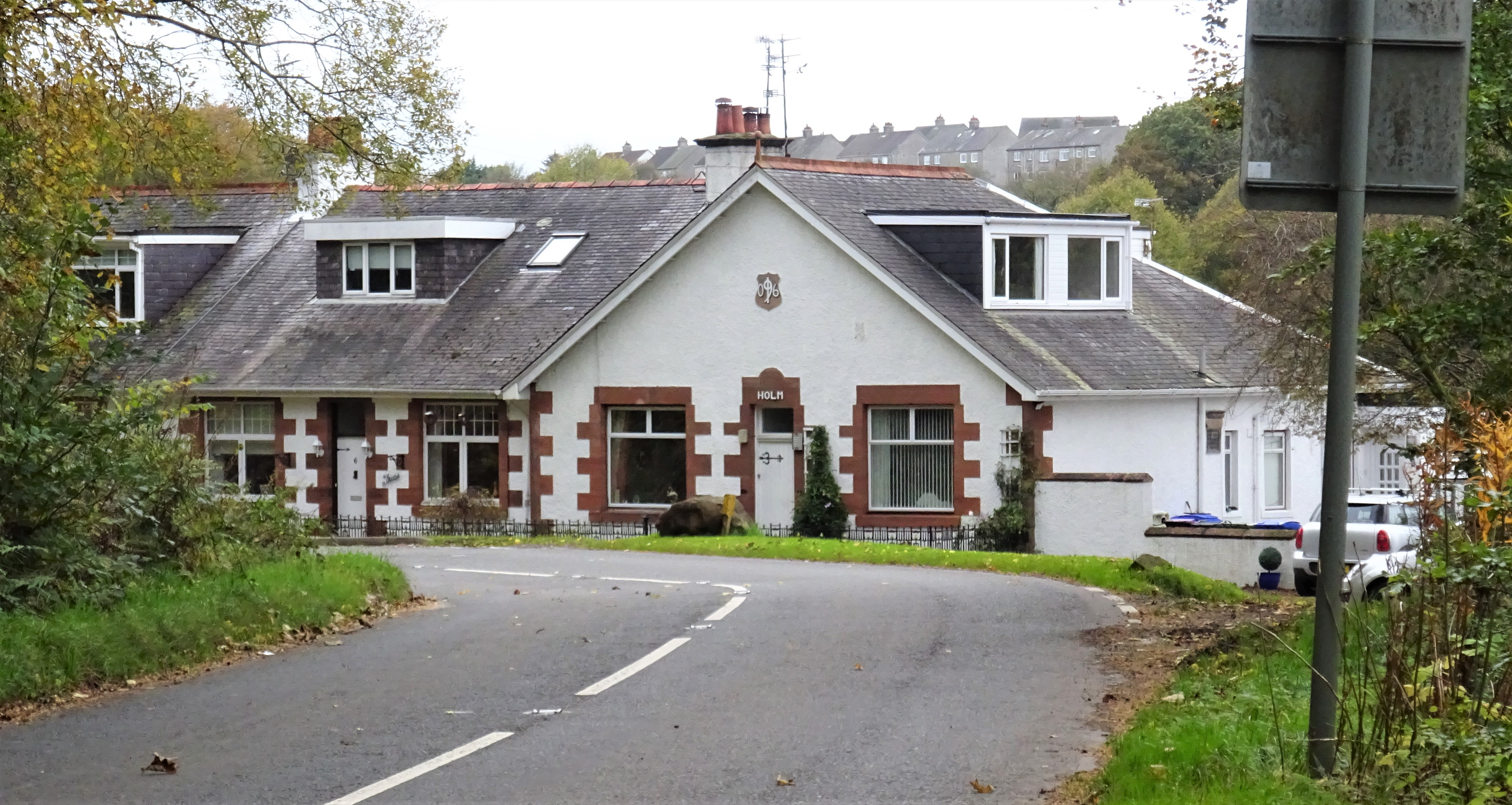
Gadgirth Holm Cottages

Built in 1808 on a prominent position overlooking the River Ayr and Gadgirth Holm it was purchased in 1949 by the council became a children's home. It was demolished in 1968. It had been built on the site of Gadgirth Castle. As stated, the 1775 William Armstrong map appears to indicate a house rather than a castle with a road running to it via Enterkine and with a bridge across the River Ayr as confirmed by the name Bridgend. In 1828 the mansion house is clearly shown with a network of roads.

Gadgirth House is shown on photographs and prints as a mansion with similarities to Logan House near Cumnock and probably designed by the same architect. It had "an advanced, eliptical, bowed projection on the centre of both main fronts, the projection on the garden front being further advanced than that on the entrance front". In 1903 alterations were carried out that were designed by the architects Honeyman, Keppie and Mackintosh.

Gadgirth Holm Cottages - Dated 1906 on their monogram, a terrace of eight estate cottages in Arts and Crafts style were built just downstream from Gadgirth Bridge. The 1906 cottages replaced an earlier set cottages, a miner's row, on the site as shown on OS maps with two coal pits nearby.

Gadgirth Mains This was the home farm and was built circa 1807. A courtyard design, it has a central arched entrance with a small dovecot above. An advert in 1807 refers to a set of farm offices that were to be built in the summer of 1808. On the 1750s map by William Roy a 'Gath Gard Mains' is already shown. A gasometer was located here to hold the coal gas made on site.

Estate features - A walled garden survives which once had several greenhouses and other buildings associated with it. The OS maps also record a monument or obelisk built in the centre of one of two old 18th century wooded roundel features on top of the hill that lies above Gadgirth Mains. The monument bore no inscription and given the fashion of early 19th century memorials to Horatio Nelson, the Battle of Trafalgar or the Battle of Waterloo it may relate to one of these or a family linked origin.

John Thomson's map of 1828 indicates an ornamental lake in front of Gadgirth House in the Byre Burn Glen, however this is no longer shown in 1908. In 1908 a sundial was shown on the OS in front of the mansion house. Gadgirth Cottage and Bankfoot Cottages were once situated on the lane to Knockshoggle Holm. The Kennels Cottage also survives as do the gates.

=== Gadgirth Viaduct ===
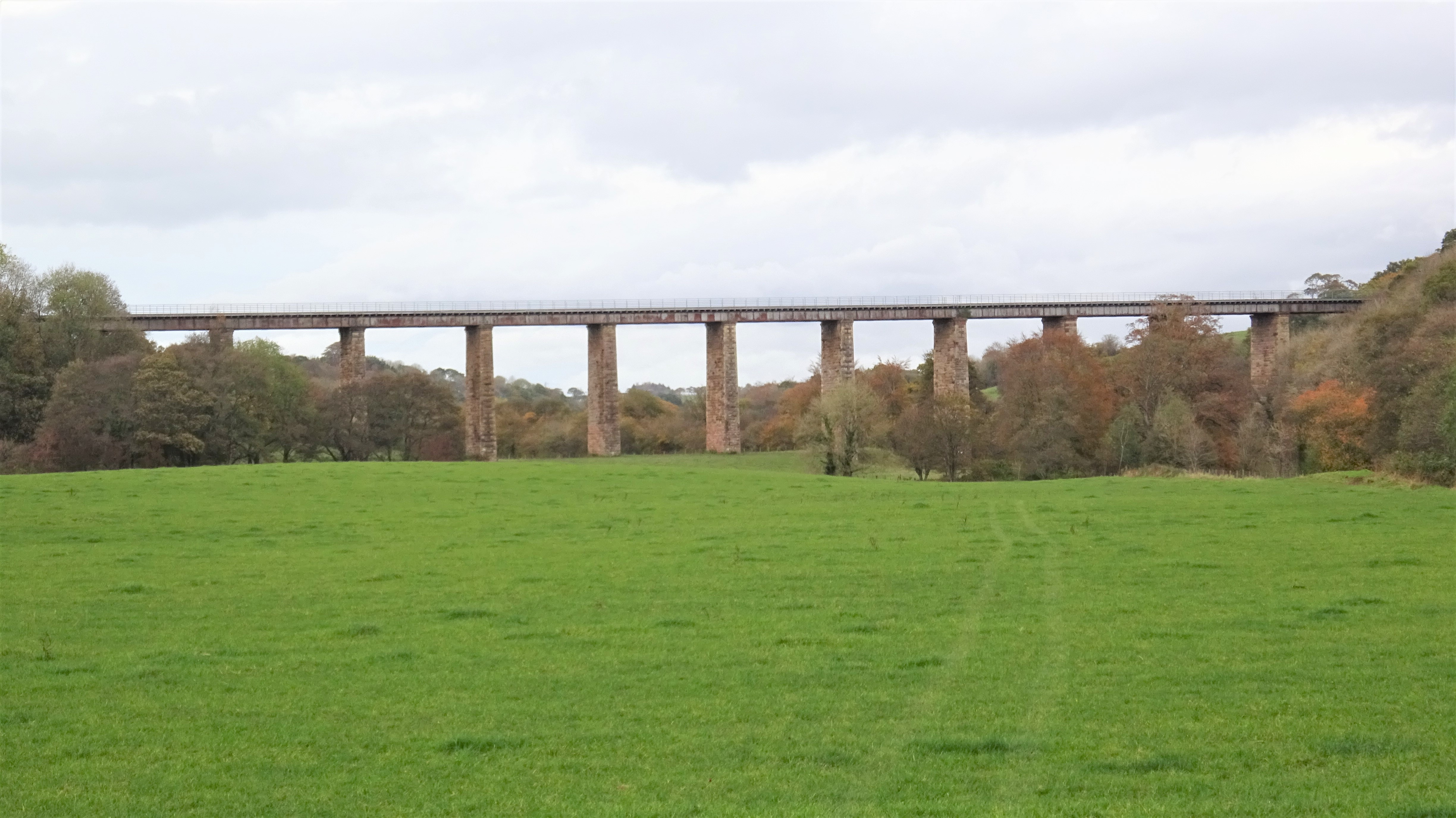
Enterkine or Gadgirth Viaduct

Also known as the Enterkine Viaduct this wrought iron bridge on stone pillars originally carried the old G&SWR line from Ayr to Cronberry over the River Ayr, latterly it was used to carry coal trains to the Killoch washery. It was still in service in 2009.

=== Etymology ===
The name 'Gadgirth' is also variously written as 'Gadgard', 'Gaitgirth', 'Galdgirth'. and may either refer to an archaic Scots unit of land measurement or even the personal name 'Galdus', recorded as an ancient King of Scots commemorated at Wigton. 'Garth' or 'Girth' refers to an enclosure. The name is given as 'Gaidyant' on Timothy Pont's map of the early 17th century. The same spelling is given in 1745. 'Gath Gard' is the spelling shown on William Roy's map of the 1750s. Armstrongs map of 1775 uses the spelling 'Gadgirth'.

== Industry ==
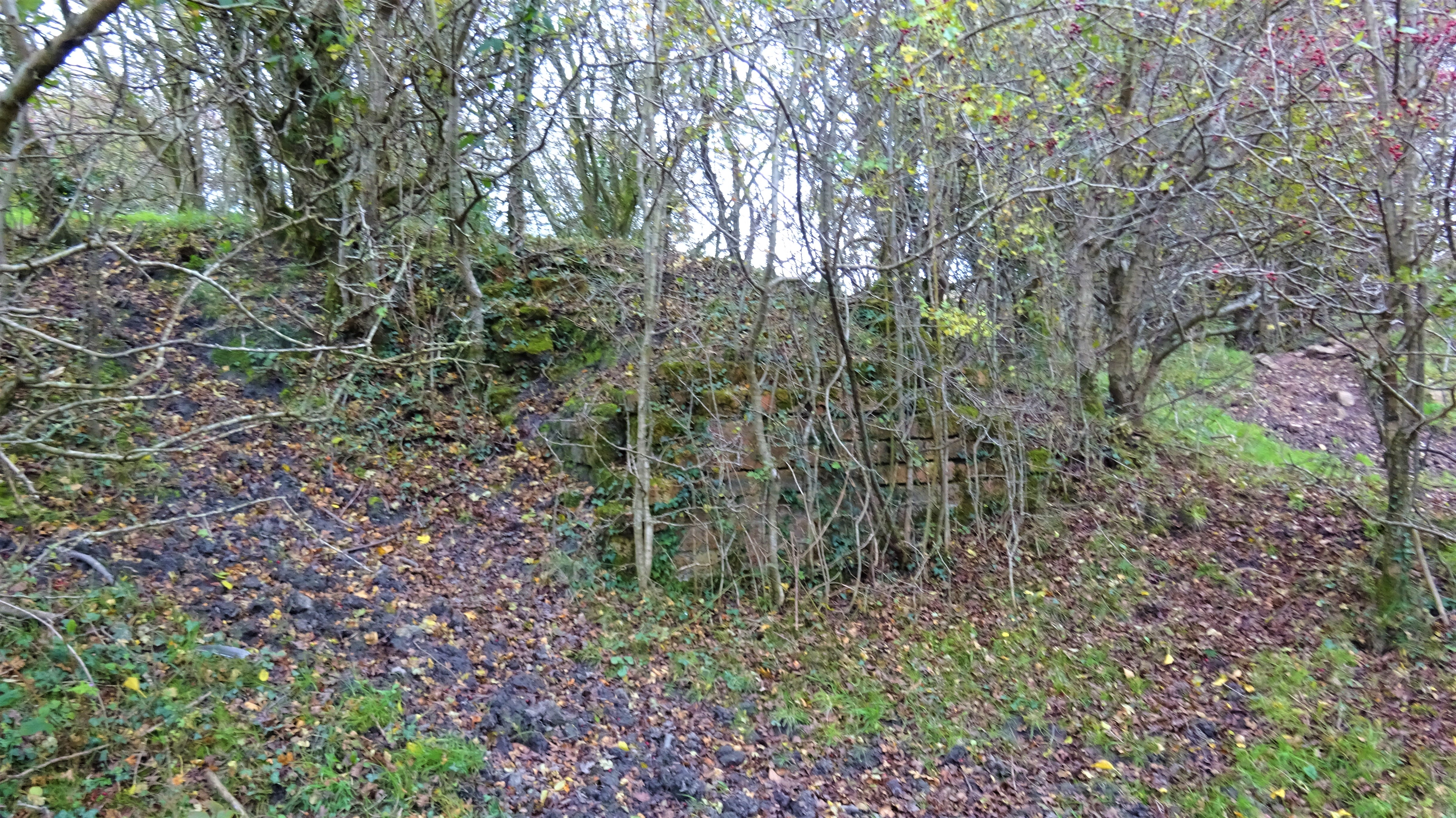
Remains of a Gadgirth Coal Pit

The ancient Privick Mills are located on the opposite bank of the River Ayr from the castles and mansion house sites with at one time extensive stone weir and lade carrying the water to the mill's wheel. It is marked as 'Preuik Mil' on Timothy Pont's early 17th century map and may have been associated with Privick House, later known as Annbank House, renamed after Lady Ann Montgomery but demolished in the 1970s. A charter of 1359 does refer to a mill and grannary belonging to the lands of Gadgirth.

At least two coal pits are recorded, one lying above Gadgirth Mains with some ruins remaining and the other with an engine house in the Byre Burn Glen. In 1875 one miner was killed and a second mortally injured. William Kerr, aged around 50, was working in the No. 1 Gadgirth Pit, Annbank Colliery and had been excavating a wedge-hole when a one ton block of coal fell on him. Taken out of the adit and carried home he died shortly afterwards, leaving a widow and ten offspring. Only two hours later a similar accident happened to a David M'Crorie, a younger man. His left arm was amputated, but his other injuries were so serious that he is not thought to have pulled through.

== Chalmerhouses, Irvine ==
The Chalmer family in 1558 held 52 acres of lands at Thornlibank also known as Chalmerhouses located at the east end of the burgh of Irvine. The burial place of the Chalmers of Chalmerhouses was at the wall of the old churchyard, on the left-hand side when walking towards the church from the Kirkgate.

== Bibliography ==
- Campbell, Thorbjorn (2003). Ayrshire. A Historical Guide. Edinburgh: Birlinn. ISBN 1-84158-267-0.
- Davis, Michael (1991). The Castles and Mansions of Ayrshire. Pub. privately.
- Love, Dane (2003). Ayrshire : Discovering a County. Fort Publishing Ltd. ISBN 0-9544461-1-9.
- McJannet, Arnold F. (1938). Royal Burgh of Irvine. Glasgow : Civic Press.
- Paterson, James (1863). History of the Counties of Ayr and Wigton. V.1. Kyle. Edinburgh : James Stillie.
- RCAHMS. (1985b) The Royal Commission on the Ancient and Historical Monuments of Scotland. The archaeological sites and monuments of North Kyle, Kyle and Carrick District, Strathclyde Region, The archaeological sites and monuments of Scotland series no 25. Edinburgh. Page(s): 24, No.114 RCAHMS Shelf Number: A.1.2.ARC/25.
- Close, Robert (1992). Ayrshire and Arran: An Illustrated Architectural Guide. Pub. Roy Inc Arch Scot. ISBN 1873190-06-9.
- Smith, J. (1895) Prehistoric man in Ayrshire. London: Elliot Stock.
