= List of listed buildings in Ballantrae, South Ayrshire =

This is a list of listed buildings in the parish of Ballantrae in South Ayrshire, Scotland.

== List ==
Name	Location	Date Listed	Grid Ref. (Note: Sometimes known as OSGB36, the grid reference (where provided) is based on the British national grid reference system used by the Ordnance Survey. • "Guide to National Grid". Ordnance Survey. • "Get-a-map". Ordnance Survey.)	Geo-coordinates	Notes	LB Number (Note: Historic Environment Scotland assign a unique alphanumeric identifier to each designated site in Scotland, for listed buildings this always begins with "LB", for example "LB12345".)	Image
Church Of The Mark				55°01′44″N 5°00′49″W	Category B	857	Upload Photo
Dovecote, Finnarts Holm				55°01′05″N 5°02′34″W	Category B	859	Upload Photo
Remains Of Former Church				55°05′57″N 5°00′18″W	Category A	869	Upload another image
Graveyard				55°05′57″N 5°00′18″W	Category B	870	Upload Photo
Ballantrae Manse With Boundary Wall And Gates				55°05′59″N 5°00′20″W	Category C(S)	4840	Upload Photo
Glenapp Manse And Steading				55°01′44″N 5°00′46″W	Category C(S)	4849	Upload Photo
Glenapp Castle				55°05′03″N 4°59′18″W	Category B	856	Upload another image
Colmonell, Glenour				55°06′31″N 4°51′58″W	Category B	6451	Upload Photo
Ardstinchar Castle				55°05′56″N 5°00′01″W	Category B	855	Upload another image See more images
Old Windmill, Mill Hill				55°06′23″N 4°59′43″W	Category A	6634	Upload another image
Finnarts Bridge				55°00′42″N 5°02′52″W	Category B	858	Upload Photo
Toll Cottage				55°05′54″N 5°00′02″W	Category C(S)	873	Upload Photo
Harbour Pier				55°06′16″N 5°00′35″W	Category B	872	Upload Photo
Ballantrae Bridge				55°05′53″N 5°00′01″W	Category B	854	Upload Photo
Parish Church				55°05′59″N 5°00′18″W	Category B	871	Upload Photo
Lagganview				55°05′55″N 5°00′01″W	Category C(S)	874	Upload Photo

== Key ==
The scheme for classifying buildings in Scotland is:

- Category A: "buildings of national or international importance, either architectural or historic; or fine, little-altered examples of some particular period, style or building type."
- Category B: "buildings of regional or more than local importance; or major examples of some particular period, style or building type, which may have been altered."
- Category C: "buildings of local importance; lesser examples of any period, style, or building type, as originally constructed or moderately altered; and simple traditional buildings which group well with other listed buildings."

In March 2016 there were 47,288 listed buildings in Scotland. Of these, 8% were Category A, and 50% were Category B, with the remaining 42% being Category C.
