= List of listed buildings in Craigie, South Ayrshire =

This is a list of listed buildings in the parish of Craigie in South Ayrshire, Scotland.

== List ==
Name	Location	Date Listed	Grid Ref. (Note: Sometimes known as OSGB36, the grid reference (where provided) is based on the British national grid reference system used by the Ordnance Survey. • "Guide to National Grid". Ordnance Survey. • "Get-a-map". Ordnance Survey.)	Geo-coordinates	Notes	LB Number (Note: Historic Environment Scotland assign a unique alphanumeric identifier to each designated site in Scotland, for listed buildings this always begins with "LB", for example "LB12345".)	Image
Carnell Estate, Former Stables And Coach House				55°33′27″N 4°25′42″W	Category C(S)	4859	Upload Photo
Parish Church And Graveyard				55°33′33″N 4°29′42″W	Category B	972	Upload Photo
Barnweill Church				55°32′12″N 4°31′44″W	Category B	975	Upload Photo
Bridge, In Carnell Policies				55°33′37″N 4°26′02″W	Category B	978	Upload Photo
Barnweill, Wallace's Monument				55°31′59″N 4°31′35″W	Category A	4856	Upload another image
Barnweill				55°32′15″N 4°31′29″W	Category B	974	Upload Photo
Craigie Castle				55°33′11″N 4°31′28″W	Category B	976	Upload Photo
Carnell				55°33′34″N 4°25′55″W	Category B	977	Upload Photo
Manse (Craigie Manse)				55°33′28″N 4°30′03″W	Category B	973	Upload Photo
Underwood				55°31′50″N 4°33′08″W	Category B	97	Upload Photo
High Borland				55°33′23″N 4°29′14″W	Category B	98	Upload Photo

== Key ==
The scheme for classifying buildings in Scotland is:

- Category A: "buildings of national or international importance, either architectural or historic; or fine, little-altered examples of some particular period, style or building type."
- Category B: "buildings of regional or more than local importance; or major examples of some particular period, style or building type, which may have been altered."
- Category C: "buildings of local importance; lesser examples of any period, style, or building type, as originally constructed or moderately altered; and simple traditional buildings which group well with other listed buildings."

In March 2016 there were 47,288 listed buildings in Scotland. Of these, 8% were Category A, and 50% were Category B, with the remaining 42% being Category C.
