= Annbank United F.C. =

Association football club in Scotland

Annbank United
- Full name: Annbank United Community Football Club
- Nickname: The Bankies
- Founded: 1939
- Ground: New Pebble Park, Annbank
- Capacity: 2,600
- Coordinates: 55°28′31″N 4°31′28″W
- Chairman: Stewart McIlwrick OBE
- Manager: Mark Pringle
- League: Ayrshire Amateur Association Division 1A
| Home colours | Away colours | Third colours |

Annbank United Football Club are a Scottish football club from Annbank, South Ayrshire. Formed in 1939, they are based at New Pebble Park and are nicknamed "The Bankies". Prior to abeyance, they competed in the West of Scotland League Second Division and wear black and white strips (uniforms).

The club reached the final of the 1952–53 Scottish Junior Cup, losing 1–0 to Vale of Leven in front of 55,800 spectators at Hampden Park. Annbank had required thirteen matches to negotiate the seven rounds to the final.

In June 2016, Annbank appointed Graeme Neil and Tom Robertson of the Ayr United Football Academy as their new management team. The duo had worked the previous season at Lugar Boswell Thistle, bringing Ayr's pro-youth players into an adult game environment.

On 14 May 2021 Annbank announced on their Twitter account that they would suspend their participation in the newly formed West of Scotland Football League for season 2021–22 whilst retaining full membership, but hoped to return in the next season. In the interim, the club started in the Ayrshire Amateur Division 2A (Winners 2021/22) & are now in Division 1A for Season 2022/23. They continue to play at New Pebble Park. Annbank won the Ayrshire Premier League title in 2024–25, going through the season unbeaten. They won every league match except for their final one which they drew 1–1 against Glenburn (losing a goal in the last few minutes after a highly contentious throw in decision).

== Honours ==
- Scottish Junior Cup runners-up: 1952–53
- Ayrshire Second Division winners: 1989–90
- Western League (Southern) winners: 1948–49
- Ayrshire (Ayrshire Weekly Press) Cup winners: 1940–41, 1943–44, 1945–46
- Ayrshire League (Rockware Glass) Cup winners: 1987–88
- Kyle & Carrick Cup winners: 1984–85, 1986–87, 1987–88, 1990–91, 1992–93
- South Ayrshire Cup winners: 1997–98
- Ayrshire Super Cup winners: 1987–88
- Western League Cup winners: 1942–43, 1943–44
- Ayrshire Consolation Cup winners: 1951–52, 1955–56
- Irvine & District Cup winners: 1943–44
- Moore Trophy: 1954–55
- Vernon Cup winners: 1951–52, 1955–56
- Henderson Memorial Shield:1956

(shared with Dwinethorpe Rovers)

- Ferguson Invitational: 1970
- Vietnam Mid-Autumn Cup:1985
