= Gadgirth Old Ha' =

Castle in Coylton, South Ayrshire, Scotland

- Gadgirth, Annbank, South Ayrshire, Scotland
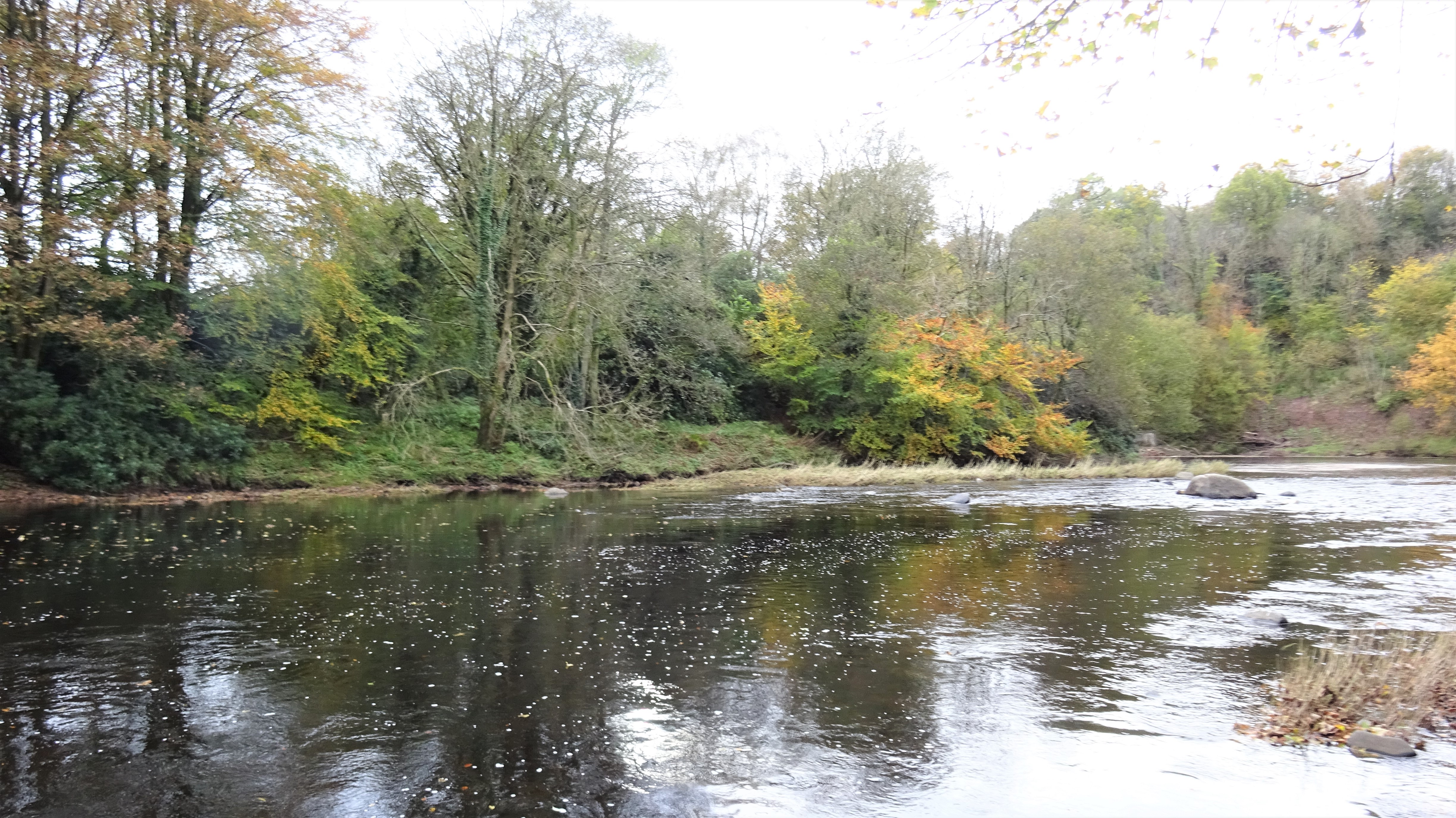
- River Ayr at Gadgirth Holm

Site information
- Type: Castle
- Owner: Private land
- Open to the public: No
- Condition: Sections of wall only

Location
- Coordinates: 55.464893°N 4.5228532°W
- Grid reference: grid reference NS406219

Site history
- Built: Pre 14th Century
- Built by: Chalmer
- Materials: Masonry

The castle known as Gadgirth Old Ha' or Gadgirth Old Hall, was the first castle at Gadgirth, held by the Chalmer family, standing on a whinstone promontory overlooking the River Ayr in the Parish of Coylton, the old district of Kyle, now part of South Ayrshire, Scotland.

== Location ==
This archaeological site lies on the southern side of the River Ayr near the B742 road that crosses the River Ayr at Gadgirth Bridge and runs up to Annbank. The castle jutts into the river on a rocky promontory with an islet located within the river at this point.

== Description ==
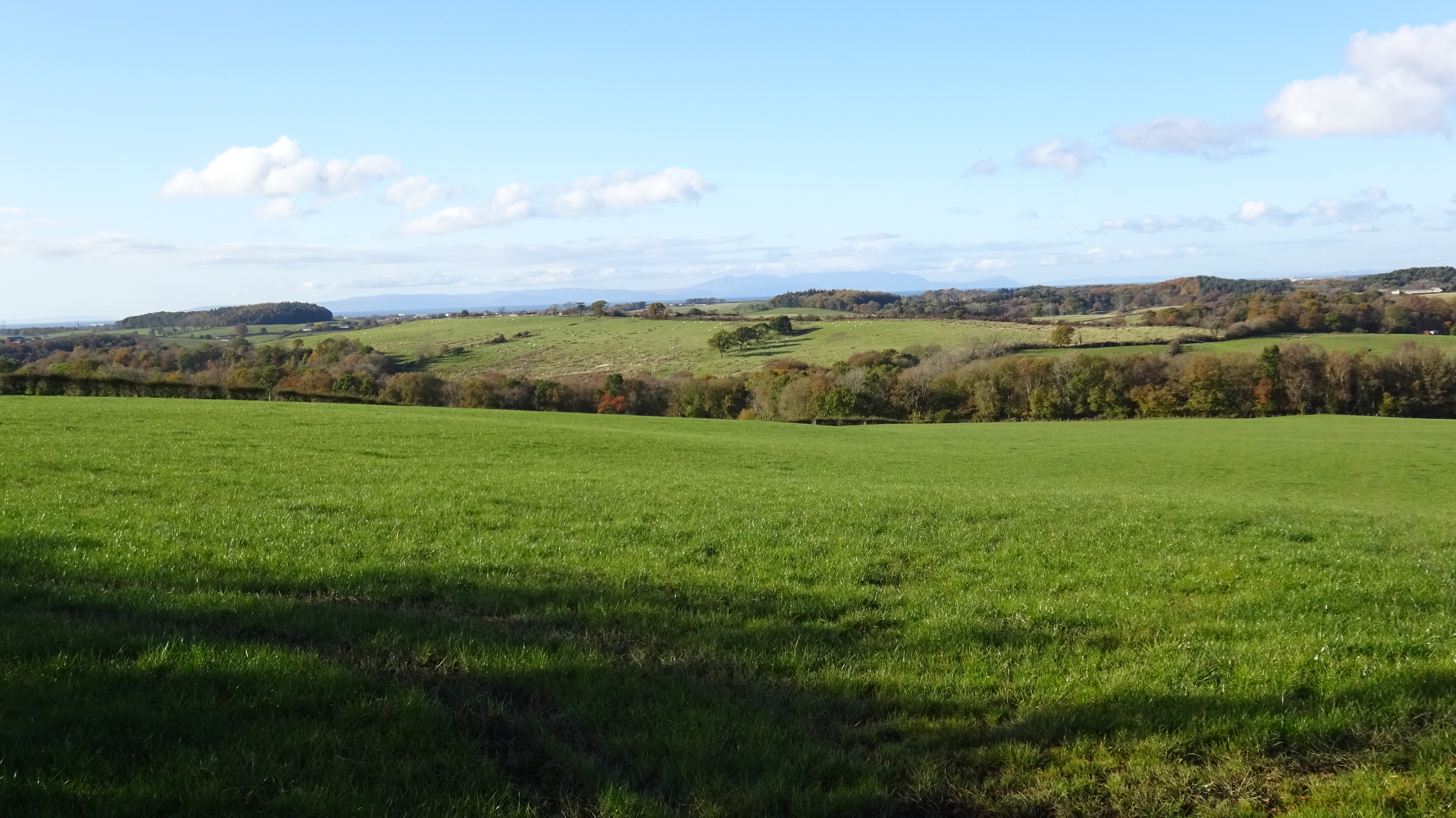
Oldhall Woods and the site of Old Ha'

The Gadgirth Old Ha' consists of a section of masonry held together with lime mortar set against the crag and another small section, circa 2.3m long and a maximum height of 1.5m high enclosing the area of circa 8.7m by 6m, apparently a corner of the building. On the sides not protected by the river are the remnants of a fosse, moat or ditch and a drawbridge is said to have been located here. The approximate dimensions of the main wall are 5.5m in length and 3.5m height.

The historian John Smith in the 1890s visited the site and stated that only a short stretch of wall could be traced. The other castle in the district was at Martnaham.

== History ==
Little is known of the history of this castle site, once held by the ancestors of the Chalmer, originally the De Camera family, which was replaced by their later 14th century Gadgirth Castle that stood around 500 metres or a quarter of a mile upstream on the same southern side of the River Ayr until demolished in 1808. Reginaldus de Camera (Chalmer) is recorded to have held the Barony of Gadgirth during the reign of William the Lion (1165-1214).

== Bibliography ==
- Campbell, Thorbjorn (2003). Ayrshire. A Historical Guide. Edinburgh: Birlinn. ISBN 1-84158-267-0.
- Love, Dane (2003). Ayrshire : Discovering a County. Fort Publishing Ltd. ISBN 0-9544461-1-9.
- Paterson, James (1863). History of the Counties of Ayr and Wigton. V.1. Kyle. Edinburgh : James Stillie.
- RCAHMS. (1985b) The Royal Commission on the Ancient and Historical Monuments of Scotland. The archaeological sites and monuments of North Kyle, Kyle and Carrick District, Strathclyde Region, The archaeological sites and monuments of Scotland series no 25. Edinburgh. Page(s): 24, No.114 RCAHMS Shelf Number: A.1.2.ARC/25
- Smith, J. (1895) Prehistoric man in Ayrshire. London: Elliot Stock.
