= List of listed buildings in Girvan, South Ayrshire =

This is a list of listed buildings in the parish of Girvan in South Ayrshire, Scotland.

== List ==
Name	Location	Date Listed	Grid Ref. (Note: Sometimes known as OSGB36, the grid reference (where provided) is based on the British national grid reference system used by the Ordnance Survey. • "Guide to National Grid". Ordnance Survey. • "Get-a-map". Ordnance Survey.)	Geo-coordinates	Notes	LB Number (Note: Historic Environment Scotland assign a unique alphanumeric identifier to each designated site in Scotland, for listed buildings this always begins with "LB", for example "LB12345".)	Image
11, 15, 17 The Avenue				55°14′35″N 4°51′08″W	Category C(S)	32114	Upload Photo
124, 126 Dalrymple Street				55°14′23″N 4°51′20″W	Category C(S)	32130	Upload Photo
17 Harbour Street				55°14′33″N 4°51′34″W	Category C(S)	32139	Upload Photo
22, 24 Harbour Street				55°14′33″N 4°51′35″W	Category C(S)	32145	Upload Photo
Strathaven Caravan Park Formerly The Manse				55°14′52″N 4°51′23″W	Category B	32157	Upload Photo
Glendoune				55°13′50″N 4°50′49″W	Category B	7651	Upload Photo
1 To 7 (Odd) Dalrymple Street				55°14′36″N 4°51′19″W	Category C(S)	32119	Upload Photo
Methodist Church, Dalrymple Street				55°14′25″N 4°51′18″W	Category B	32124	Upload Photo
34, 36, 38, 38A, 40 Dalrymple Street				55°14′32″N 4°51′20″W	Category C(S)	32128	Upload Photo
Hamilton Street, Woolwich Building Society				55°14′36″N 4°51′14″W	Category B	32135	Upload Photo
8-10 Harbour Street				55°14′34″N 4°51′36″W	Category C(S)	32141	Upload Photo
12-14 Harbour Street				55°14′34″N 4°51′35″W	Category C(S)	32142	Upload Photo
20 Harbour Street				55°14′33″N 4°51′35″W	Category C(S)	32144	Upload Photo
19 Knockcushan				55°14′35″N 4°51′25″W	Category B	32149	Upload Photo
Knockcushan House, Knockcushan				55°14′33″N 4°51′40″W	Category B	32150	Upload Photo
1, 3, 5, 7, 9 Ailsa Place				55°14′33″N 4°51′23″W	Category C(S)	32101	Upload Photo
12, 14 The Avenue				55°14′35″N 4°51′08″W	Category C(S)	32107	Upload Photo
26, 28, 30, 32 Dalrymple Street				55°14′33″N 4°51′20″W	Category C(S)	32127	Upload Photo
Dalrymple Street Mckechnie Institute				55°14′32″N 4°51′20″W	Category B	32129	Upload Photo
Hamilton Street Forestry Commission And Department Of Employment				55°14′36″N 4°51′17″W	Category B	32134	Upload Photo
26, 28 Harbour Street				55°14′32″N 4°51′35″W	Category C(S)	32146	Upload Photo
30, 32 Harbour Street				55°14′32″N 4°51′35″W	Category C(S)	32147	Upload Photo
Knockcushan Street Town Hall Tower				55°14′36″N 4°51′22″W	Category B	32148	Upload another image
Old Street, Girvan Old Church Yard				55°14′42″N 4°51′16″W	Category B	32155	Upload Photo
2 And 4 (Now One House) Ailsa Place				55°14′32″N 4°51′22″W	Category C(S)	32102	Upload Photo
The Avenue Mccrindle And 4				55°14′35″N 4°51′10″W	Category C(S)	32104	Upload Photo
Bridge Mill				55°15′05″N 4°50′37″W	Category C(S)	50006	Upload Photo
17 Dalrymple Street Bank Of Scotland				55°14′34″N 4°51′19″W	Category B	32122	Upload Photo
19, 21, 23 Dalrymple Street				55°14′33″N 4°51′19″W	Category C(S)	32123	Upload Photo
Hamilton Street Pet Shop				55°14′36″N 4°51′19″W	Category C(S)	32133	Upload Photo
Montgomerie Street North Parish Church				55°14′38″N 4°51′09″W	Category B	32154	Upload Photo
Old Street, Ailsa Arms Hotel				55°14′47″N 4°51′10″W	Category C(S)	32156	Upload Photo
15 Henrietta Street				55°14′33″N 4°51′30″W	Category C(S)	32158	Upload Photo
6, 8 The Avenue				55°14′35″N 4°51′10″W	Category C(S)	32105	Upload Photo
The Avenue Bloomfield				55°14′34″N 4°51′09″W	Category B	32108	Upload Photo
The Avenue Southfield				55°14′34″N 4°51′07″W	Category B	32109	Upload Photo
26 The Avenue				55°14′32″N 4°51′02″W	Category C(S)	32111	Upload Photo
The Avenue The Davidson Hospital				55°14′33″N 4°51′00″W	Category B	32115	Upload Photo
6 Harbour Street				55°14′34″N 4°51′36″W	Category C(S)	32140	Upload Photo
16-18 Harbour Street				55°14′33″N 4°51′35″W	Category C(S)	32143	Upload Photo
Montgomerie Street, Queens Hotel				55°14′38″N 4°51′11″W	Category B	32151	Upload Photo
Low Trowier				55°14′22″N 4°50′03″W	Category B	13665	Upload Photo
The Avenue Mansfield				55°14′33″N 4°51′04″W	Category C(S)	32110	Upload Photo
13, 15 Dalrymple Street				55°14′35″N 4°51′19″W	Category C(S)	32121	Upload Photo
14 Dalrymple Street Royal Bank Of Scotland				55°14′34″N 4°51′21″W	Category B	32125	Upload Photo
134, 136 Dalrymple Street				55°14′21″N 4°51′21″W	Category C(S)	32131	Upload Photo
13 Harbour Street				55°14′34″N 4°51′34″W	Category C(S)	32137	Upload Photo
15 Harbour Street				55°14′33″N 4°51′34″W	Category C(S)	32138	Upload Photo
Girvan Station Including Signal Box				55°14′46″N 4°50′54″W	Category B	50007	Upload Photo
10 The Avenue				55°14′35″N 4°51′09″W	Category C(S)	32106	Upload Photo
28 The Avenue				55°14′32″N 4°51′02″W	Category B	32112	Upload Photo
Parkhall And 34A The Avenue				55°14′31″N 4°50′58″W	Category C(S)	32113	Upload Photo
Church Square St Andrew's Church				55°14′35″N 4°51′12″W	Category B	32116	Upload Photo
1 Church Square				55°14′37″N 4°51′12″W	Category B	32117	Upload Photo
Grasshopper, 9, 11 Dalrymple Street				55°14′35″N 4°51′19″W	Category C(S)	32120	Upload Photo
The Post Office Dalrymple Street				55°14′34″N 4°51′20″W	Category C(S)	32126	Upload Photo
Duff Street Mcwilliam And Son				55°14′16″N 4°51′25″W	Category C(S)	32132	Upload Photo
10 Montgomerie Street				55°14′37″N 4°51′09″W	Category C(S)	32152	Upload Photo
Trochrague				55°15′53″N 4°48′59″W	Category B	7652	Upload Photo
3 Church Square				55°14′37″N 4°51′12″W	Category C(S)	32118	Upload Photo
Hamilton Street Halifax Building Society				55°14′37″N 4°51′19″W	Category B	32136	Upload Photo
8 Montgomerie Street				55°14′37″N 4°51′10″W	Category C(S)	32153	Upload Photo
6 Ailsa Place				55°14′33″N 4°51′22″W	Category C(S)	32103	Upload Photo
Woodlands				55°13′01″N 4°52′22″W	Category B	7650	Upload Photo

== Key ==
The scheme for classifying buildings in Scotland is:

- Category A: "buildings of national or international importance, either architectural or historic; or fine, little-altered examples of some particular period, style or building type."
- Category B: "buildings of regional or more than local importance; or major examples of some particular period, style or building type, which may have been altered."
- Category C: "buildings of local importance; lesser examples of any period, style, or building type, as originally constructed or moderately altered; and simple traditional buildings which group well with other listed buildings."

In March 2016 there were 47,288 listed buildings in Scotland. Of these, 8% were Category A, and 50% were Category B, with the remaining 42% being Category C.
