= List of listed buildings in Symington, South Ayrshire =

This is a list of listed buildings in the parish of Symington in South Ayrshire, Scotland.

== List ==
Name	Location	Date listed	Grid ref. (Note: Sometimes known as OSGB36, the grid reference (where provided) is based on the British national grid reference system used by the Ordnance Survey. • "Guide to National Grid". Ordnance Survey. • "Get-a-map". Ordnance Survey.)	Geo-coordinates	Notes	LB number (Note: Historic Environment Scotland assign a unique alphanumeric identifier to each designated site in Scotland, for listed buildings this always begins with "LB", for example "LB12345".)	Image
Parish Church And Graveyard				55°32′58″N 4°33′46″W	Category A	14357	Upload another image See more images
Manse Kerricks Road				55°32′56″N 4°33′50″W	Category B	14358	Upload Photo
70 Main Street, Townend Cottage, Including Walled Garden, Entrance Gatepiers And Gates				55°33′05″N 4°34′01″W	Category B	14366	Upload Photo
Coodham, East Lodge With Gatepiers And Gates				55°33′51″N 4°32′16″W	Category C(S)	14369	Upload Photo
Symington Road North, Symington School (Former) Including Boundary Walls, Railings, Gatepiers And Gates				55°32′57″N 4°33′31″W	Category C(S)	46776	Upload Photo
Kirkhill				55°32′57″N 4°33′44″W	Category C(S)	19691	Upload Photo
Brewlands				55°32′59″N 4°33′41″W	Category C(S)	14362	Upload Photo
Lindisfarne				55°32′58″N 4°33′42″W	Category C(S)	14363	Upload Photo
Former Post Office				55°32′58″N 4°33′49″W	Category C(S)	14365	Upload Photo
Townend & Stables				55°33′04″N 4°34′27″W	Category B	14367	Upload Photo
Wheatsheaf Inn				55°32′56″N 4°33′46″W	Category C(S)	14361	Upload another image See more images
Coodham House				55°33′40″N 4°32′42″W	Category A	14368	Upload another image
Old School House				55°32′58″N 4°33′43″W	Category C(S)	14364	Upload Photo
Dundonald, Dankeith Farm				55°34′19″N 4°33′58″W	Category C(S)	51582	Upload Photo
Dundonald, Dankeith Leisure Centre, Dankeith House				55°33′55″N 4°33′55″W	Category B	51583	Upload Photo
Stables, Coodham				55°33′43″N 4°32′28″W	Category B	19692	Upload Photo

== Key ==
The scheme for classifying buildings in Scotland is:

- Category A: "buildings of national or international importance, either architectural or historic; or fine, little-altered examples of some particular period, style or building type."
- Category B: "buildings of regional or more than local importance; or major examples of some particular period, style or building type, which may have been altered."
- Category C: "buildings of local importance; lesser examples of any period, style, or building type, as originally constructed or moderately altered; and simple traditional buildings which group well with other listed buildings."

In March 2016 there were 47,288 listed buildings in Scotland. Of these, 8% were Category A, and 50% were Category B, with the remaining 42% being Category C.
