= Annbank =

Village in South Ayrshire, Scotland

Coordinates: 55.47°N 04.53°W

- Location within South Ayrshire
- Population: 890 (2020)
- OS grid reference: NS4023
- Council area: South Ayrshire
- Country: Scotland
- Sovereign state: United Kingdom
- Post town: Ayr
- Postcode district: KA6
- Police: Scotland
- Fire: Scottish
- Ambulance: Scottish
- UK Parliament: Central Ayrshire
- Scottish Parliament: Carrick, Cumnock and Doon Valley

Annbank is a village in South Ayrshire, Scotland. It is around five miles east of Ayr. Originally a mining settlement, it once had a rail link to Ayr via the Auchincruive Waggonway.

== Amenities ==
The village has a village hall, shop, bowling green, junior football club (Annbank United and Annbank United 2013) and a pub. The pub is known as "Tap o' the Brae" which in May 2014 won Ayrshire pub of the year.

Weston Bridge Halt railway station was located at the bridge of that name near Annbank and stood close to Ayr Colliery No.9. It was used by miners travelling to their respective collieries.

Annbank House once overlooked the River Ayr and Gadgirth Holm; however, it was demolished after use as a hotel.

Gadgirth Old Ha' stood on the River Ayr close to Privick Mill and the old Gadgirth House.

The Castle and Barony of Gadgirth was once located beside the River Ayr to the east of Annbank.

== Sport ==
The village used to host a senior association football club, Annbank F.C., which played at Pebble Park, and which twice reached the quarter-finals of the Scottish Cup. It is currently represented by Annbank United. There was also a junior version of the club known as Annbank United 2013, but they liquidated due to short of players in 2025.

== Notable people ==
- James Brown, Member of Parliament 1918-1939
- Sam Donnelly, professional footballer
