= List of listed buildings in Barr, South Ayrshire =

This is a list of listed buildings in the parish of Barr in South Ayrshire, Scotland.

== List ==
Name	Location	Date Listed	Grid Ref. (Note: Sometimes known as OSGB36, the grid reference (where provided) is based on the British national grid reference system used by the Ordnance Survey. • "Guide to National Grid". Ordnance Survey. • "Get-a-map". Ordnance Survey.)	Geo-coordinates	Notes	LB Number (Note: Historic Environment Scotland assign a unique alphanumeric identifier to each designated site in Scotland, for listed buildings this always begins with "LB", for example "LB12345".)	Image
Burnlea, Gregside, An Empty House Adjoining King's Arm's Hotel. (4 Dwellings In All)				55°12′39″N 4°42′40″W	Category B	1031	Upload Photo
Elm Cottage, And Woodbine Cottage				55°12′45″N 4°42′35″W	Category C(S)	1035	Upload Photo
Kirk Dominal				55°11′56″N 4°44′43″W	Category B	1027	Upload Photo
Alton Albany				55°12′27″N 4°43′02″W	Category B	1024	Upload Photo
Old Churchyard				55°12′40″N 4°42′42″W	Category C(S)	1028	Upload Photo
Shalloch Cottage				55°12′37″N 4°42′32″W	Category C(S)	1033	Upload Photo
Alton Albany Farmhouse				55°12′25″N 4°42′56″W	Category C(S)	1036	Upload Photo
Gregg Bridge				55°12′37″N 4°42′49″W	Category C(S)	1030	Upload Photo
Bridge View				55°12′37″N 4°42′33″W	Category C(S)	1032	Upload Photo
Parish Church				55°12′38″N 4°42′49″W	Category C(S)	1037	Upload Photo
The Jolly Shephard Hotel				55°12′39″N 4°42′37″W	Category C(S)	102	Upload Photo
Lodge To Alton Albany				55°12′38″N 4°42′57″W	Category C(S)	101	Upload Photo
Barrhill, Black Clauchrie House, Including Courtyard Wall And Outbuildings				55°07′24″N 4°40′14″W	Category C(S)	51530	Upload Photo
Stinchar Bridge				55°12′38″N 4°42′55″W	Category B	1029	Upload Photo
Gregholm				55°12′36″N 4°42′32″W	Category B	1034	Upload Photo
Dinmurchie Farmhouse				55°12′34″N 4°42′26″W	Category C(S)	1038	Upload Photo
Former Uf Church Manse				55°12′44″N 4°42′42″W	Category C(S)	1023	Upload Photo
Auchensoul With Steading				55°12′02″N 4°44′18″W	Category C(S)	4878	Upload Photo

== Key ==
The scheme for classifying buildings in Scotland is:

- Category A: "buildings of national or international importance, either architectural or historic; or fine, little-altered examples of some particular period, style or building type."
- Category B: "buildings of regional or more than local importance; or major examples of some particular period, style or building type, which may have been altered."
- Category C: "buildings of local importance; lesser examples of any period, style, or building type, as originally constructed or moderately altered; and simple traditional buildings which group well with other listed buildings."

In March 2016 there were 47,288 listed buildings in Scotland. Of these, 8% were Category A, and 50% were Category B, with the remaining 42% being Category C.
