= Robert Bryden =

Scots artist & sculptor (1865–1939)

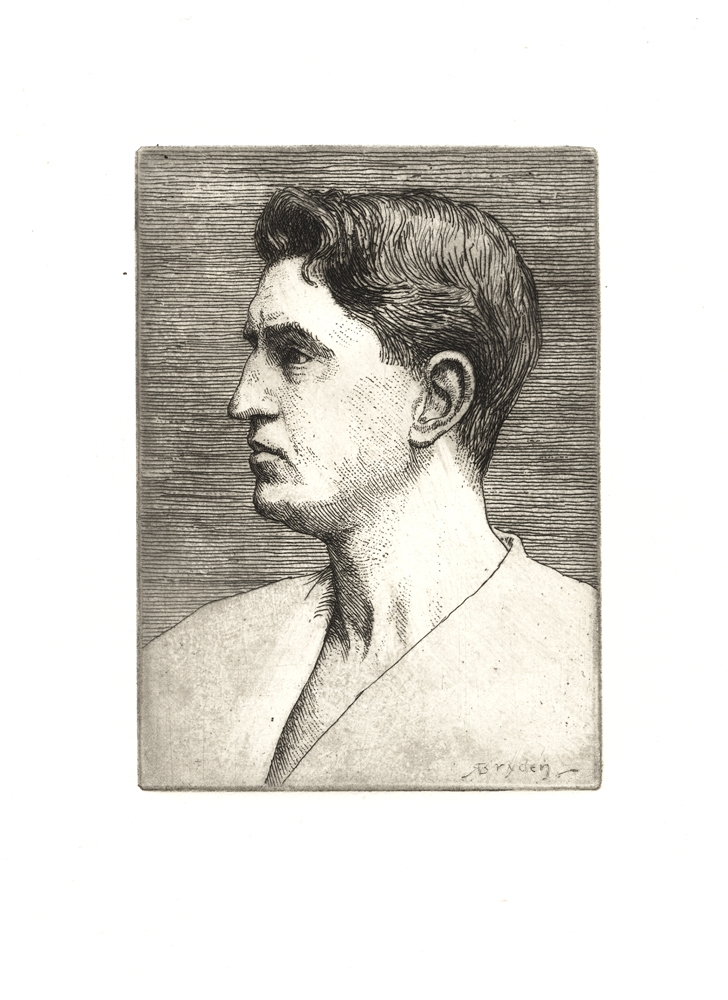
- Robert Bryden, self-portrait 1890
- Born: 11 June 1865; Coylton, South Ayrshire, Scotland
- Died: 1939 (aged 73–74)
- Known for: Painting, engraving, sculpture

Robert Bryden (11 June 1865–1939) was a Scots artist and sculptor.

Bryden was born in Coylton in South Ayrshire, Scotland. After a period working in the office of Hunter & Morris, architects in Ayr, he moved to London where he stayed for fifteen years studying, at the RSA and the Royal Academy, making a living from commissions and teaching art.

He had a large output, working as a painter, engraver and sculptor. Among his works are bronze portraits of William Wallace and Robert the Bruce in Ayr Town Hall. he also specialised in carved wooded figures, a collection of which are to be found at Rozelle House Galleries, a museum of art, in Ayrshire. Bryden is also responsible for the Coylton War Memorial.

In 1899 he was granted the title of Royal Engraver. He published three volumes of etchings illustrating castles in the County of Ayrshire.
