= List of listed buildings in Dundonald, South Ayrshire =

This is a list of listed buildings in the parish of Dundonald in South Ayrshire, Scotland.

== List ==
Name	Location	Date Listed	Grid Ref. (Note: Sometimes known as OSGB36, the grid reference (where provided) is based on the British national grid reference system used by the Ordnance Survey. • "Guide to National Grid". Ordnance Survey. • "Get-a-map". Ordnance Survey.)	Geo-coordinates	Notes	LB Number (Note: Historic Environment Scotland assign a unique alphanumeric identifier to each designated site in Scotland, for listed buildings this always begins with "LB", for example "LB12345".)	Image
Fairlie, Walled Garden With Potting Sheds				55°35′20″N 4°34′00″W	Category C(S)	4866	Upload Photo
Auchans Castle				55°34′38″N 4°36′41″W	Category A	984	Upload Photo
West Gatehead, Laigh Milton Viaduct				55°35′56″N 4°34′02″W	Category A	990	Upload Photo
South Wood Road, Sandhill House Including Stable Building				55°31′23″N 4°37′30″W	Category B	50154	Upload Photo
Hillhouse Estate, Stables				55°34′08″N 4°37′43″W	Category C(S)	4869	Upload Photo
Hillhouse				55°34′10″N 4°37′45″W	Category B	988	Upload Photo
Crossburn House Loans				55°32′57″N 4°37′13″W	Category B	989	Upload Photo
Newfield Mains, Walled Garden And Gardener's Cottage				55°34′45″N 4°34′31″W	Category C(S)	49644	Upload Photo
Monkton, Southwood Road, "3 Grey Gables", Gardener's Cottage And Stables				55°31′34″N 4°37′41″W	Category B	6386	Upload Photo
Lodge, Fairlie				55°35′16″N 4°33′30″W	Category A	987	Upload Photo
Glenfoot House, Including Garage And Lodge				55°34′31″N 4°35′36″W	Category B	980	Upload Photo
Crooks				55°34′13″N 4°34′05″W	Category B	982	Upload Photo
Dundonald Castle				55°34′36″N 4°35′50″W	Category A	983	Upload another image
Southwood Road, Southwood House, With Boundary Wall, Gates And Gatepiers				55°31′39″N 4°37′48″W	Category B	48578	Upload Photo
Frognal House Including Greenhouse, Gatepiers And Boundary Walls				55°31′43″N 4°37′34″W	Category B	45582	Upload Photo
Parish Church And Graveyard				55°34′29″N 4°35′35″W	Category B	979	Upload Photo
Gatehead, Old Rome Bridge				55°35′33″N 4°33′13″W	Category C(S)	4871	Upload Photo
Fairlie House				55°35′26″N 4°33′50″W	Category A	985	Upload Photo
Monkton, Southwood Road,"3 Grey Gables" Including Gatepiers, Terraced Garden And Garden Features				55°31′36″N 4°37′44″W	Category A	6385	Upload Photo
Tarbolton Road, Laurieston Farmhouse				55°34′25″N 4°35′12″W	Category C(S)	981	Upload Photo
Fairlie Mains				55°35′16″N 4°33′59″W	Category B	986	Upload another image

== Key ==
The scheme for classifying buildings in Scotland is:

- Category A: "buildings of national or international importance, either architectural or historic; or fine, little-altered examples of some particular period, style or building type."
- Category B: "buildings of regional or more than local importance; or major examples of some particular period, style or building type, which may have been altered."
- Category C: "buildings of local importance; lesser examples of any period, style, or building type, as originally constructed or moderately altered; and simple traditional buildings which group well with other listed buildings."

In March 2016 there were 47,288 listed buildings in Scotland. Of these, 8% were Category A, and 50% were Category B, with the remaining 42% being Category C.
