= List of listed buildings in Kirkmichael, South Ayrshire =

This is a list of listed buildings in the parish of Kirkmichael in South Ayrshire, Scotland.

== List ==
Name	Location	Date Listed	Grid Ref. (Note: Sometimes known as OSGB36, the grid reference (where provided) is based on the British national grid reference system used by the Ordnance Survey. • "Guide to National Grid". Ordnance Survey. • "Get-a-map". Ordnance Survey.)	Geo-coordinates	Notes	LB Number (Note: Historic Environment Scotland assign a unique alphanumeric identifier to each designated site in Scotland, for listed buildings this always begins with "LB", for example "LB12345".)	Image
Guiltreehill				55°21′47″N 4°35′27″W	Category C(S)	13783	Upload Photo
8 Patna Road Kirkmichael				55°20′45″N 4°37′04″W	Category B	7547	Upload Photo
16 Patna Road Kirkmichael				55°20′45″N 4°37′02″W	Category B	7548	Upload Photo
Adjoining 20 Patna Road Kirkmichael				55°20′46″N 4°37′00″W	Category C(S)	7550	Upload Photo
Crosshill Village Nos. 15-91 (Odd Numbers Only) Dalhowan Street				55°19′26″N 4°38′21″W	Category B	7559	Upload Photo
31 Patna Road Kirkmichael				55°20′47″N 4°36′57″W	Category C(S)	7538	Upload Photo
Duniquaich 39 Patna Road Kirkmichael				55°20′47″N 4°36′56″W	Category B	7540	Upload Photo
Parkfairn				55°19′13″N 4°37′15″W	Category C(S)	50005	Upload Photo
36 Patna Road Kirkmichael				55°20′46″N 4°36′56″W	Category B	13653	Upload Photo
40 Patna Road Kirkmichael				55°20′47″N 4°36′55″W	Category C(S)	13656	Upload Photo
Cloncaird Castle, Stable Block And Boundary Wall, Steps And Ancillary Structures				55°20′09″N 4°35′17″W	Category C(S)	11740	Upload Photo
30 Patna Road (Mr Mcculloch, Plasterer) Kirkmichael				55°20′46″N 4°36′58″W	Category C(S)	7551	Upload Photo
32 Patna Road Kirkmichael				55°20′46″N 4°36′57″W	Category C(S)	7552	Upload Photo
Hillburn 76 Patna Road Kirkmichael				55°20′47″N 4°36′41″W	Category C(S)	7553	Upload Photo
Gatepiers, Kirkmichael House				55°20′31″N 4°36′49″W	Category B	7554	Upload Photo
Blairquhan Bridge				55°20′20″N 4°35′56″W	Category B	7555	Upload Photo
Kirkmichael Arms, The White House And Adjoining Joiner's Shop				55°20′45″N 4°37′04″W	Category B	7544	Upload Photo
60 Patna Road Kirkmichael				55°20′47″N 4°36′50″W	Category C(S)	7565	Upload Photo
43 Patna Road Kirkmichael				55°20′47″N 4°36′55″W	Category B	7541	Upload Photo
45 Patna Road Kirkmichael				55°20′47″N 4°36′54″W	Category B	7542	Upload Photo
Myrtle Cottage 47 Patna Road Kirkmichael				55°20′47″N 4°36′54″W	Category B	7543	Upload Photo
Cloncaird Castle, Former Garage And Store				55°20′10″N 4°35′18″W	Category C(S)	50618	Upload Photo
42 Patna Road Kirkmichael				55°20′47″N 4°36′54″W	Category C(S)	7561	Upload Photo
Kirkmichael, 2 Burnside Row, The Auld Posthouse				55°20′47″N 4°36′53″W	Category C(S)	7562	Upload Photo
58 Patna Road (Now Belongs To 50) Kirkmichael				55°20′47″N 4°36′51″W	Category C(S)	7564	Upload Photo
Kirkmichael Parish Church, (Church Of Scotland)				55°20′48″N 4°36′39″W	Category B	7534	Upload Photo
Lych Gate And Graveyard				55°20′49″N 4°36′39″W	Category B	7535	Upload Photo
Rose Cottage 37 Patna Road Kirkmichael				55°20′47″N 4°36′57″W	Category C(S)	7539	Upload Photo
Cloncaird Castle, Bridge				55°20′07″N 4°35′21″W	Category C(S)	13782	Upload Photo
Blairquhan Estate, Blairquhan Lodge				55°20′19″N 4°35′57″W	Category C(S)	11738	Upload Photo
The Manse 63 Patna Road Kirkmichael				55°20′50″N 4°36′53″W	Category B	7545	Upload Photo
Longhill				55°18′55″N 4°36′36″W	Category B	7556	Upload Photo
Dovecote, Drumfad				55°20′21″N 4°35′08″W	Category A	7558	Upload Photo
Tolverne 38 Patna Road Kirkmichael				55°20′46″N 4°36′55″W	Category C(S)	7560	Upload Photo
Bridge, Portcheck				55°20′47″N 4°36′45″W	Category B	7536	Upload Photo
Cassillis Castle				55°22′52″N 4°37′16″W	Category A	13655	Upload another image
Cloncaird Castle				55°20′04″N 4°35′25″W	Category B	7557	Upload Photo
74 Patna Road Kirkmichael				55°20′47″N 4°36′43″W	Category C(S)	7566	Upload Photo
Fairholm 34 Patna Road Kirkmichael				55°20′46″N 4°36′57″W	Category C(S)	7533	Upload Photo
20 Patna Road Kirkmichael				55°20′46″N 4°37′01″W	Category C(S)	7549	Upload Photo
Kirkmichael House				55°20′31″N 4°37′04″W	Category B	13654	Upload Photo
62 Patna Road Kirkmichael				55°20′47″N 4°36′50″W	Category C(S)	13657	Upload Photo
81 Patna Road Kirkmichael				55°20′48″N 4°36′42″W	Category C(S)	7546	Upload Photo
Almar 50 Patna Road Kirkmichael				55°20′47″N 4°36′51″W	Category C(S)	7563	Upload Photo
Portcheck 3 Bolestyle Road Kirkmichael				55°20′46″N 4°36′44″W	Category C(S)	7537	Upload Photo

== Key ==
The scheme for classifying buildings in Scotland is:

- Category A: "buildings of national or international importance, either architectural or historic; or fine, little-altered examples of some particular period, style or building type."
- Category B: "buildings of regional or more than local importance; or major examples of some particular period, style or building type, which may have been altered."
- Category C: "buildings of local importance; lesser examples of any period, style, or building type, as originally constructed or moderately altered; and simple traditional buildings which group well with other listed buildings."

In March 2016 there were 47,288 listed buildings in Scotland. Of these, 8% were Category A, and 50% were Category B, with the remaining 42% being Category C.
