= List of listed buildings in Colmonell, South Ayrshire =

This is a list of listed buildings in the parish of Colmonell in South Ayrshire, Scotland.

== List ==
Name	Location	Date Listed	Grid Ref. (Note: Sometimes known as OSGB36, the grid reference (where provided) is based on the British national grid reference system used by the Ordnance Survey. • "Guide to National Grid". Ordnance Survey. • "Get-a-map". Ordnance Survey.)	Geo-coordinates	Notes	LB Number (Note: Historic Environment Scotland assign a unique alphanumeric identifier to each designated site in Scotland, for listed buildings this always begins with "LB", for example "LB12345".)	Image
Limekilns Near Bougang Farm				55°07′43″N 4°57′31″W	Category C(S)	4879	Upload Photo
4-10 (Even Numbers) Rowantree Street Colmonell				55°07′58″N 4°54′41″W	Category C(S)	1043	Upload Photo
55 Main Street				55°08′01″N 4°54′23″W	Category C(S)	1046	Upload Photo
57-63 (Odd) Main Street				55°08′01″N 4°54′22″W	Category C(S)	1047	Upload Photo
Knockdolian				55°07′42″N 4°56′44″W	Category B	1049	Upload Photo
Kildonan House				55°06′38″N 4°46′49″W	Category A	1052	Upload another image See more images
Parish Church And Churchyard				55°07′53″N 4°54′44″W	Category B	1040	Upload Photo
1-7 (Odd Numbers) Rowntree Street Colmonell				55°07′57″N 4°54′41″W	Category C(S)	1044	Upload Photo
Pinwherry Castle				55°08′32″N 4°49′45″W	Category B	1057	Upload Photo
Kirkhill				55°08′01″N 4°54′37″W	Category B	1042	Upload Photo
39-43 (Odd) Main Street				55°08′00″N 4°54′25″W	Category C(S)	1045	Upload Photo
Colmonell Bridge				55°07′49″N 4°54′14″W	Category B	1050	Upload Photo
Memorial Stone On Sea Shore, Lendalfoot				55°10′17″N 4°56′00″W	Category B	1059	Upload Photo
Daljarrock Hotel				55°09′17″N 4°49′57″W	Category B	104	Upload Photo
Manse Road, Colmonell Manse, Including Ancillary Buildings And Boundary Walls				55°07′53″N 4°54′47″W	Category C(S)	49938	Upload Photo
65 Main Street				55°08′02″N 4°54′21″W	Category C(S)	103	Upload Photo
Barrhill, Former Arnsheen Church				55°06′19″N 4°46′32″W	Category C(S)	51617	Upload Photo
Railway Viaduct Near Pinmore				55°10′51″N 4°49′36″W	Category B	1055	Upload another image
Knockdolian Castle				55°07′38″N 4°56′44″W	Category B	1048	Upload Photo
Craigneil Castle				55°07′38″N 4°54′28″W	Category B	1051	Upload Photo
Martyr's Tomb Barrhill				55°06′00″N 4°46′19″W	Category B	1054	Upload Photo
Kirkhill Castle				55°08′00″N 4°54′36″W	Category B	1041	Upload Photo
Ballochmorrie				55°07′21″N 4°48′16″W	Category B	1053	Upload Photo
Pinmore Bridge				55°10′15″N 4°49′24″W	Category B	1056	Upload Photo
Carleton Castle				55°09′53″N 4°55′57″W	Category B	1058	Upload Photo

== Key ==
The scheme for classifying buildings in Scotland is:

- Category A: "buildings of national or international importance, either architectural or historic; or fine, little-altered examples of some particular period, style or building type."
- Category B: "buildings of regional or more than local importance; or major examples of some particular period, style or building type, which may have been altered."
- Category C: "buildings of local importance; lesser examples of any period, style, or building type, as originally constructed or moderately altered; and simple traditional buildings which group well with other listed buildings."

In March 2016 there were 47,288 listed buildings in Scotland. Of these, 8% were Category A, and 50% were Category B, with the remaining 42% being Category C.
