= Coylton =

Coordinates: 55.443414°N 4.518319°W

Coylton: Scots: Culton
- Location within South Ayrshire
- Population: 2,160 (2020)
- OS grid reference: NS413194
- Council area: South Ayrshire
- Lieutenancy area: Ayrshire and Arran
- Country: Scotland
- Sovereign state: United Kingdom
- Post town: AYR
- Postcode district: KA6
- Police: Scotland
- Fire: Scottish
- Ambulance: Scottish
- UK Parliament: Ayr, Carrick and Cumnock
- Scottish Parliament: Carrick, Cumnock and Doon Valley

Coylton (Scots: Culton) is a village and civil parish in South Ayrshire, Scotland. It is five miles (eight kilometres) east of Ayr and 2 1/2 miles (4 kilometres) west of Drongan, on the A70. Sundrum Castle Holiday Park is to the west of the village, in the grounds of Sundrum Castle, which partly dates to the 13th century. A rocking stone stands atop the Craigs of Kyle near Coylton. It weighs about 30 tons and rests upon two stones. A large standing stone known as Wallace's Stone stands nearby. The village is also home to a parish church of the Gothic style, built in 1832.

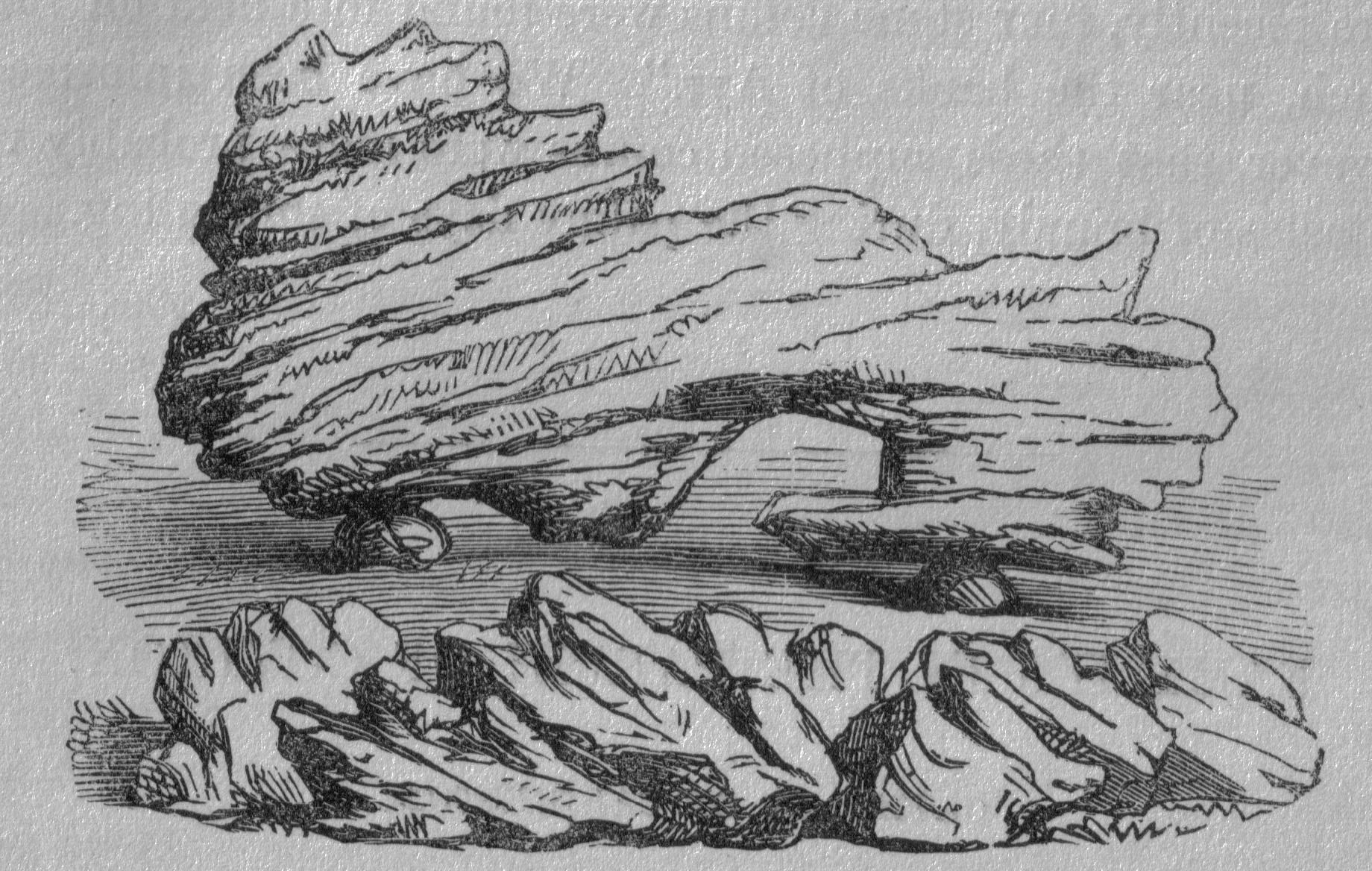
The Coylton rocking stone

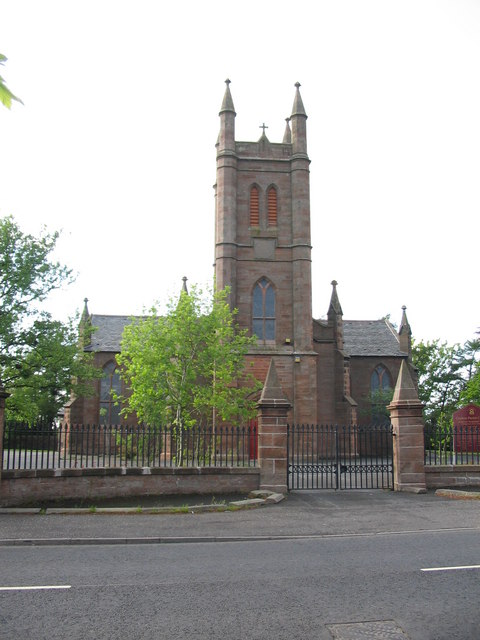
Coylton Parish Church

== Notable people ==
Professional footballers George Getgood (1892–1970) and David Affleck (1912–1984) were born in Coylton. Coylton was also home to one of Ayrshire's celebrated artists. Robert Bryden (1865–1939) was born in the village. After a period working in Ayr, he became a modeller of bronze busts which are highly regarded. Among his works are bronze portraits of William Wallace and Robert the Bruce in Ayr Town Hall. He also specialised in carved wooded figures, a collection of which are to be found at Rozelle. Bryden is also responsible for the Coylton War Memorial, a stone cross located near the church at the eastern end of the village. The author George Douglas Brown, notable for his pioneering 1901 novel "The House with the Green Shutters", was born in nearby Ochiltree and received his early schooling in Coylton.

Rev David Shaw, Moderator of the General Assembly of the Church of Scotland in 1775 was the minister of Coylton.

== Amenities ==
In its current form the village has various facilities, including a primary school, activity center, tennis courts, a local shop, one of Ayrshire's top restaurants (The Coylton Arms) and a petrol station. A number of shops can be found to the western end of the village, including a convenience store, butcher (having moved from George Campbell's original store), takeaways and a popular café. These shops are located on the previous site of Murray's Garage, and the unit is aptly named Murray Park.

== History ==
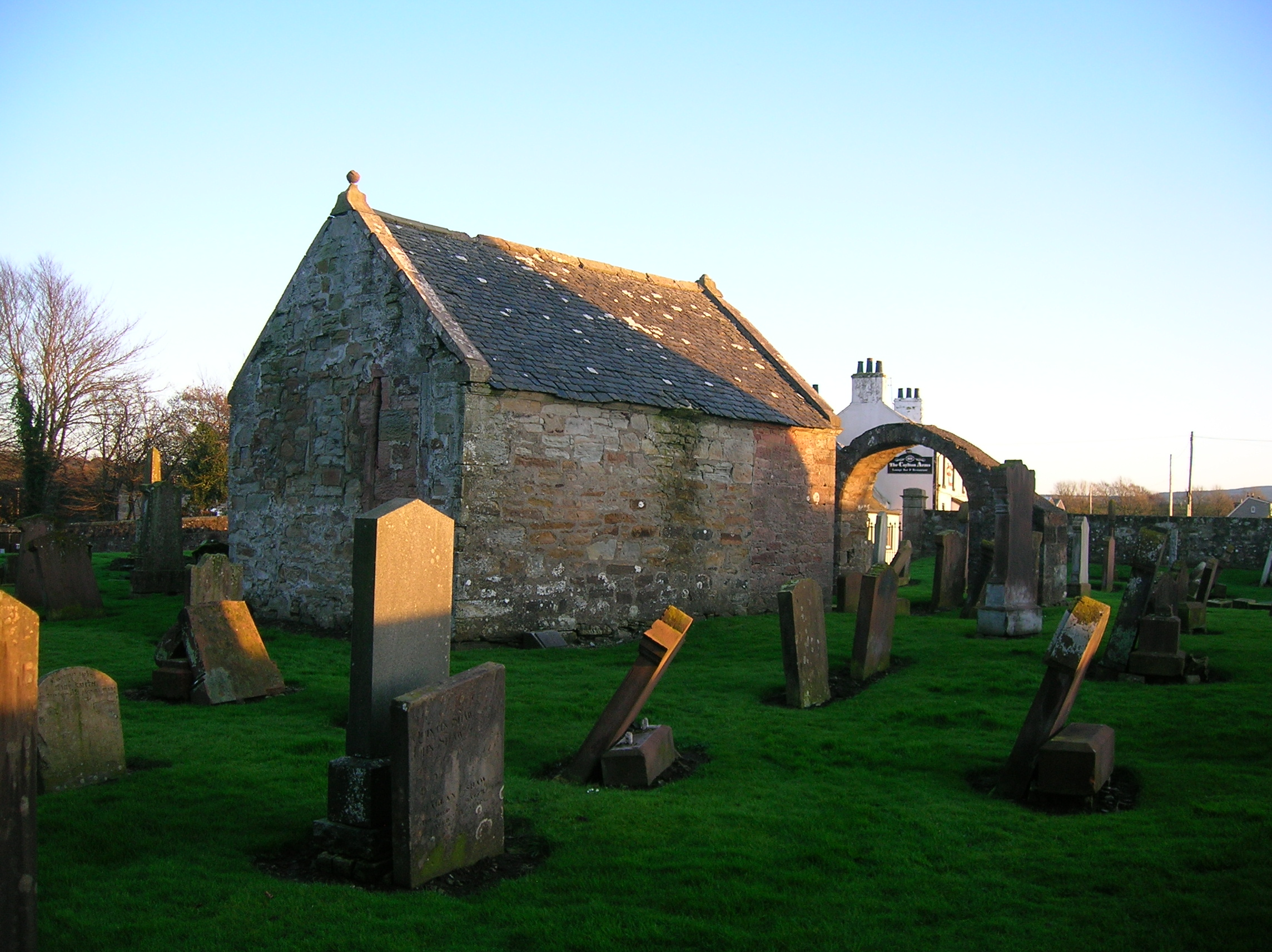
The Hamilton Aisle and archway at the old parish kirk, Low Coylton

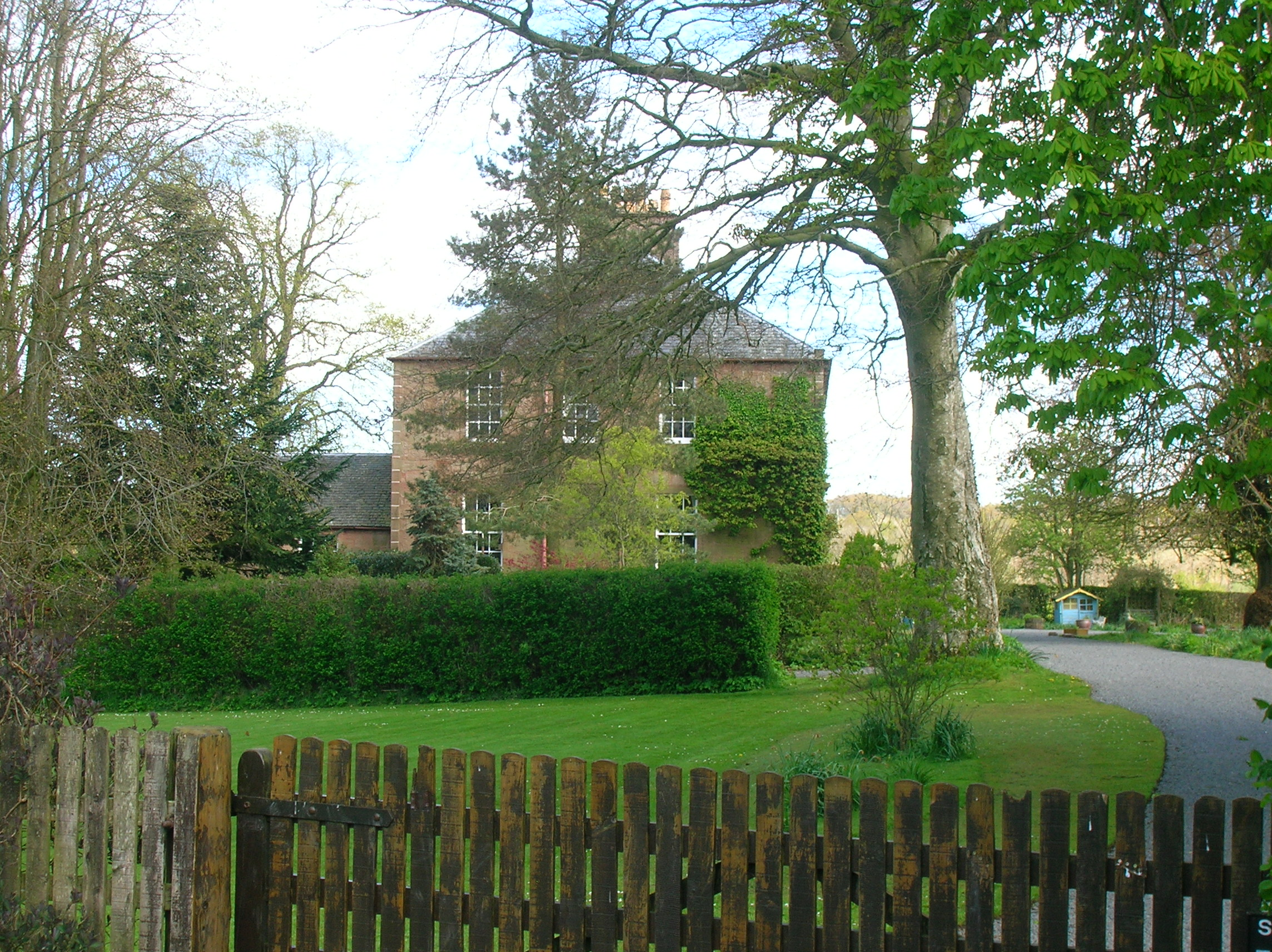
Coylton Old Manse

Coylton is one of the smallest civil parishes in Ayrshire in geographical sense, but it boasted a sizeable population during the peak of the coal mining industry in the late 19th and early 20th centuries. The parish historically includes the original settlement or Low Coylton, Upper Coylton (or Hillhead), Joppa, Craighall, Woodside and the village of Rankinston. The areas of Low Coylton, Hillhead, Joppa, along with contemporary housing estates such as Barngore and Highpark form today's Coylton village. The village is said to take its name from "Auld King Coil of Coilsfield" (Coel Hen) but old records have it spelt Quiltoun or Cuilton.

The village at the heart of the parish is almost linear, being spread along the length of the Ayr to Cumnock A70 road - which is used by the heavy trucks sustaining the modern open-cast coal mining industry. Low Coylton is the oldest part of the village, featuring the Coylton Arms and the few remains of an older life, such as the village cemetery and old kirk, a site of possibly medieval origins which was last repaired in 1776, along with the former manse dating from 1839, itself built on the site of an earlier manse. The current parish church, built in 1832, is located in Hillhead alongside houses that were miner's row houses in the late 19th century, more of which can be seen in Joppa. The modern village features a number of residential developments seeking to provide homes for people working in Ayr and district.

Coylton was once a rural village that was transformed by the development of mining in the area and has since changed dramatically again with the cessation of all coal mining. The local farms, such as that at Duchray, have sustained some of Ayrshire's agricultural heritage.

The village of Joppa was reputedly named for an ale-house kept by a man named Hendry. Local lore has it that he fed his customers with salt herrings which became known as "Joppa hams".

The Castle and Barony of Gadgirth were located in the Parish of Coylton. The castle was demolished in 1808 and replaced by Gadgirth House which after becoming a children's home in 1949 was demolished in 1968.

== Coylton and Burns ==
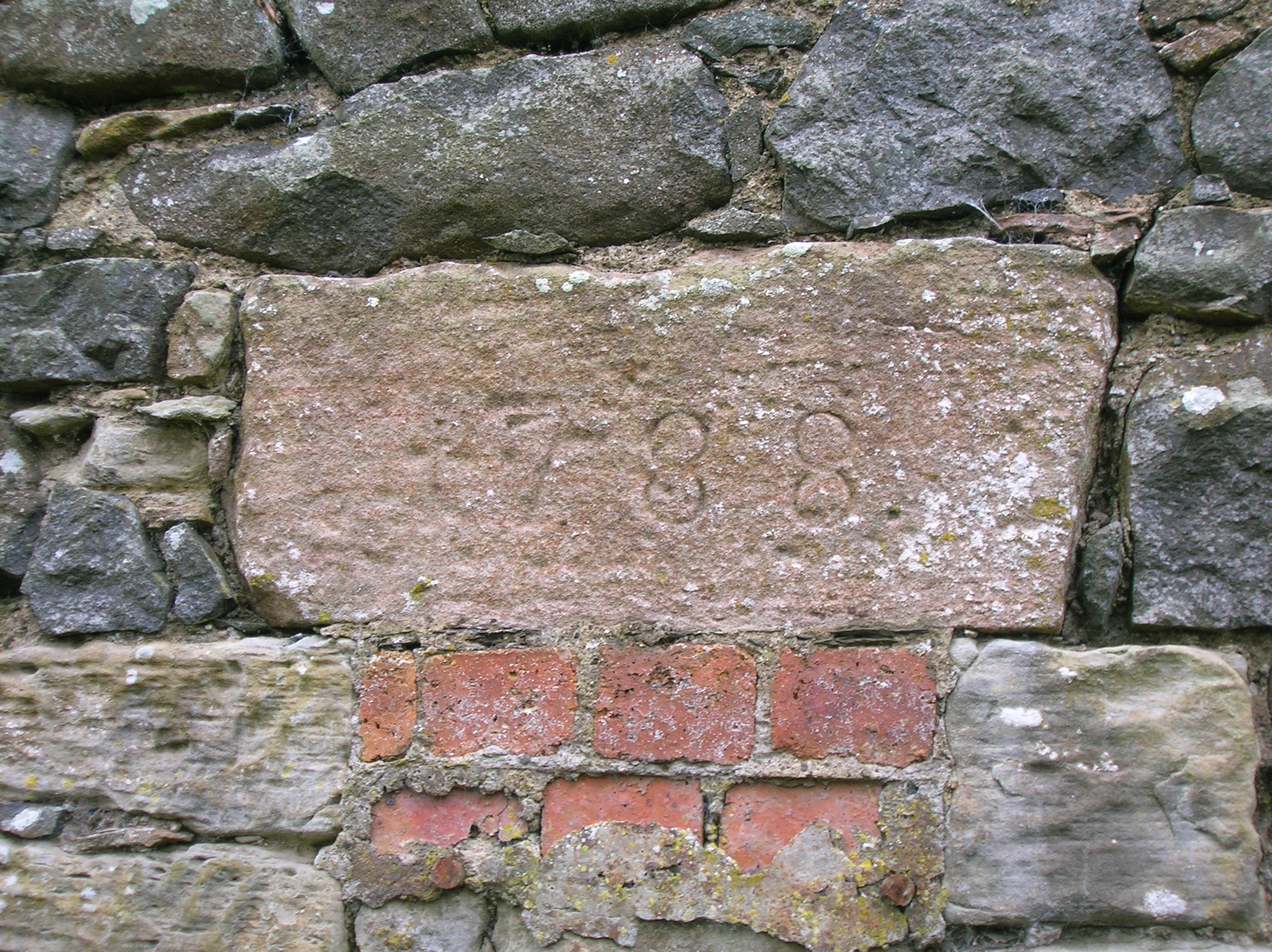
Datestone at Millmannoch Mill

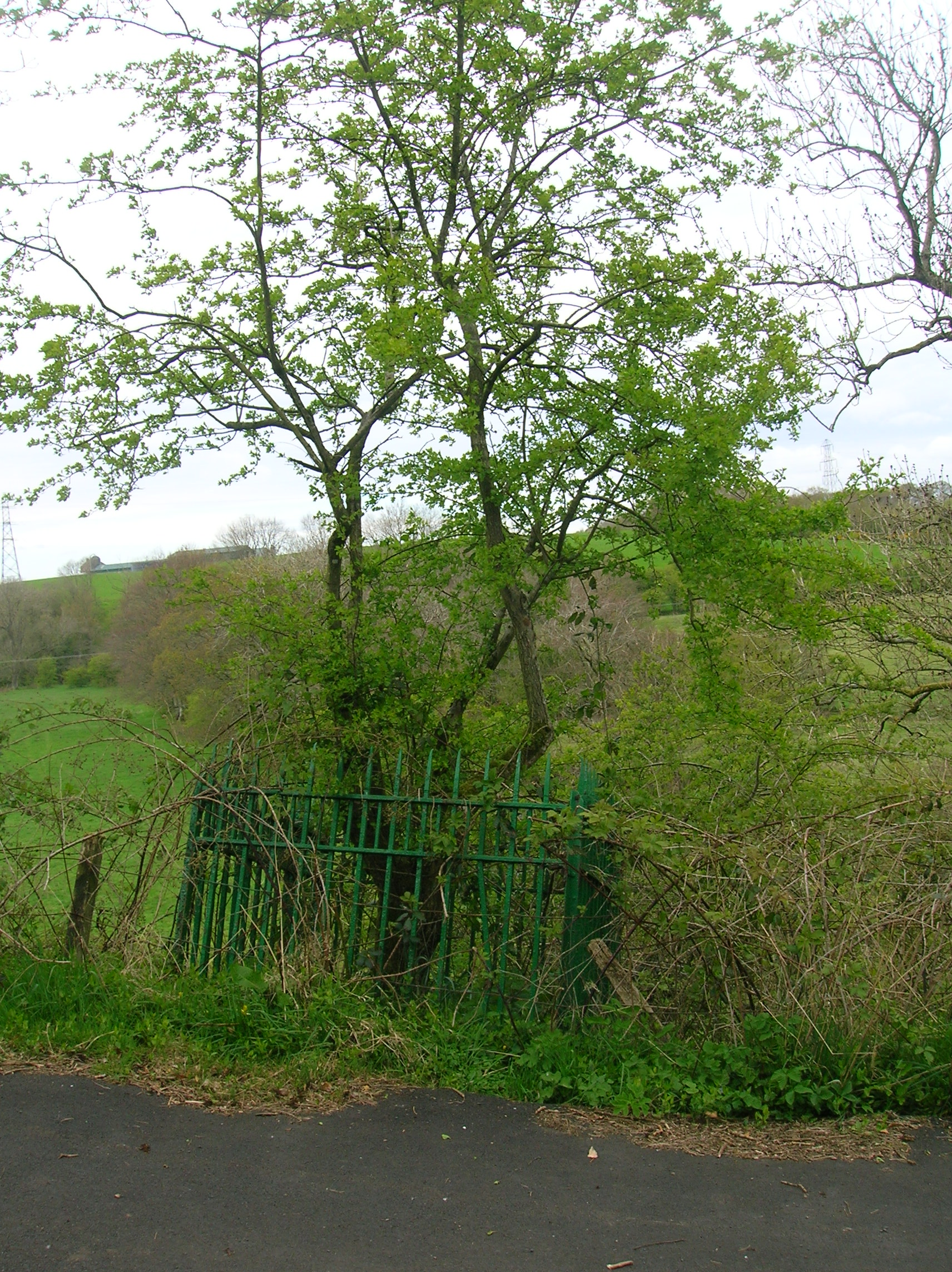
The Trysting Thorn near Millmannoch

An offshoot of the original Trysting Thorn, immortalised by Robert Burns in "The Soldier's Return," has been moved from its original site to a spot farther from the road, by Coylton Burns Club. The thorn which is situated on the land of Millmannoch, near Coylton has romantic memories for many couples in the village, and even now the old meeting place of lovers is still a popular spot for ramblers. The original thorn, which, is known to have existed long before Burns was alive, died in 1916. The tree was left for two years in the hope that it would recover, but finally it was removed and Mr JP Wilson, an enthusiastic Burns fan, along with a few helpers, decided to nurture the shoots which began to grow up on the spot where the old thorn had grown. The shoots sprouted from haws which had fallen from the parent tree, and the strongest of these was chosen. This shoot flourished, but because it was so near the roadway, many people, instead of cutting sprigs from it, broke pieces off. This was gradually killing the tree and Coylton Burns Club finally decided that if the thorn was to be preserved it would require to be moved farther from the roadway and ring-fenced.

This work was carried out by members of the club. After the move was completed, a verse from "The Soldier's Return" was inscribed inside the railing. The ballad itself was written by Burns long after he left Ayrshire. His reference to the Trysting Thorn which occurs in the third verse is as follows:

At length I reach'd the bonnie glen
Where early life I sported;
I pass'd the mill, an' trysting thorn,
Where Nancy aft I courted.

== Coylton Tennis Club ==
A tennis club was started at Coylton in 1927-1928 by the young people of Coylton and play was suspended during the war years.

In 1946-1947 the club was reactivated with one blaes court and the later addition of a clubhouse. Alex Murray (one of the four brothers who owned the local garage), an existing tennis club member, recalls playing tennis in the 1950s on this surface. At this time there was a fairly strong membership with roughly equal numbers of male and female members. National Service however meant that many young men were called up and limited information exists about the fate of tennis in Coylton which appears to have been suspended again in the 1960s.

The present-day club was founded by the then local postmistress, Mrs Traynor, in 1979 after a lapse of many years. There was one all weather court and a few dedicated adults who negotiated with the local council to arrange playing times on the village court. Junior membership was built up with weekly coaching from Frank Paul and tournaments every Sunday, open to all the juniors in the village and run by Mrs E Ross. Gradually membership and enthusiasm increased and several members became coaches, enabling the club to offer their own junior and senior coaching sessions.

In 1982 two new courts were added in Coylton by Kyle and Carrick District Council, replacing the older court. The club flourished with increased membership and coaches. Despite only having two courts, the club entered both gents and ladies teams in the Ayrshire league but had to obtain the use of a third court from a local caravan park, an annual present of a bottle of Scotch sealing the deal! The introduction of teams at junior level quickly followed with continued success.

In the early 1990s, the small stone pavilion near the courts which was shared with the local football club was extended, by means of a donation from British Coal, to incorporate a small room enabling the club to entertain visiting teams. The main drawback was that this facility could not remain open for the use of members or the dissemination of information.

In 1995, a new activity centre was built in Coylton on the site of the existing courts by South Ayrshire Council. The club benefitted by having three brand new courts complete with floodlighting, which are now leased from South Ayrshire Council. To complement these courts, the club purchased a portacabin as a clubhouse. In the last couple of years a more permanent structure has been built to serve as the clubhouse with all the required facilities.

The club continues to flourish with five adult teams and a junior section also participating locally with noted success. The club has managed to produce players at district, county and South of Scotland level and also one at national level, who has gone on to become a Scottish coach with Tennis Scotland.

== See also ==
- Loch Fergus
- Snipe Loch
- Lochend Loch
- Gadgirth Old Ha'
- Castle and Barony of Gadgirth
- Sundrum Castle
