= List of listed buildings in Monkton And Prestwick, South Ayrshire =

This is a list of listed buildings in the parish of Monkton And Prestwick in South Ayrshire, Scotland.

== List ==
| Name | Location | Date Listed | Grid Ref. (Note: Sometimes known as OSGB36, the grid reference (where provided) is based on the British national grid reference system used by the Ordnance Survey. • "Guide to National Grid". Ordnance Survey. • "Get-a-map". Ordnance Survey.) | Geo-coordinates | Notes | LB Number (Note: Historic Environment Scotland assign a unique alphanumeric identifier to each designated site in Scotland, for listed buildings this always begins with "LB", for example "LB12345".) | Image |
|---|---|---|---|---|---|---|---|
| Ladykirk House, Stable Courtyard | | | | 55°30′29″N 4°33′17″W | Category C(S) | 19476 | Upload Photo |
| Windmill, Whiteside | | | | 55°31′07″N 4°35′45″W | Category A | 14252 | Upload Photo |
| Building No 1, Spirit Aerosystems, Prestwick, (Former Palace Of Engineering) | | | | 55°30′52″N 4°35′56″W | Category C(S) | 51683 | Upload Photo |
| Ladykirk House, Lady-Kirk (Remains Of) And Walled Garden | | | | 55°30′26″N 4°33′26″W | Category B | 19481 | Upload Photo |
| Ladykirk House, Lodge, Including Gatepiers, Gates And Adjoining Walls | | | | 55°30′11″N 4°33′17″W | Category B | 47574 | Upload Photo |
| Prestwick Town Station Including Waiting Room | | | | 55°30′05″N 4°36′51″W | Category C(S) | 50004 | Upload Photo |
| Ladykirk House | | | | 55°30′35″N 4°33′31″W | Category B | 19474 | Upload Photo |
| Macrae's Monument | | | | 55°31′14″N 4°35′27″W | Category A | 14253 | Upload Photo |
| Monkton, Tarbolton Road, The Old Manse And Stable | | | | 55°30′56″N 4°36′04″W | Category B | 18195 | Upload Photo |
| Ruined Church Of St. Cuthbert, Monkton, And Old Graveyard | | | | 55°30′55″N 4°36′07″W | Category A | 14251 | Upload Photo |
| Monktonhead Farm With Horsemill | | | | 55°31′22″N 4°36′15″W | Category C(S) | 18198 | Upload Photo |
| Burial Ground, Fairfield | | | | 55°31′19″N 4°36′36″W | Category C(S) | 14254 | Upload Photo |
| South Bogside | | | | 55°30′52″N 4°33′20″W | Category B | 19679 | Upload Photo |

== Key ==
The scheme for classifying buildings in Scotland is:

- Category A: "buildings of national or international importance, either architectural or historic; or fine, little-altered examples of some particular period, style or building type."
- Category B: "buildings of regional or more than local importance; or major examples of some particular period, style or building type, which may have been altered."
- Category C: "buildings of local importance; lesser examples of any period, style, or building type, as originally constructed or moderately altered; and simple traditional buildings which group well with other listed buildings."

In March 2016 there were 47,288 listed buildings in Scotland. Of these, 8% were Category A, and 50% were Category B, with the remaining 42% being Category C.
