= List of listed buildings in Kirkoswald, South Ayrshire =

This is a list of listed buildings in the parish of Kirkoswald in South Ayrshire, Scotland.

== List ==
Name	Location	Date Listed	Grid Ref. (Note: Sometimes known as OSGB36, the grid reference (where provided) is based on the British national grid reference system used by the Ordnance Survey. • "Guide to National Grid". Ordnance Survey. • "Get-a-map". Ordnance Survey.)	Geo-coordinates	Notes	LB Number (Note: Historic Environment Scotland assign a unique alphanumeric identifier to each designated site in Scotland, for listed buildings this always begins with "LB", for example "LB12345".)	Image
Culzean Estate, Ardlochan Lodge				55°20′37″N 4°48′26″W	Category C(S)	11748	Upload Photo
Turnberry Lodge Farm				55°18′41″N 4°49′49″W	Category B	7591	Upload Photo
Culzean Castle				55°21′18″N 4°47′17″W	Category A	7595	Upload another image See more images
Turnberry Lighthouse And Keepers' Houses				55°19′33″N 4°50′41″W	Category B	12991	Upload Photo
Manse. (Now Glebe House)				55°19′41″N 4°46′39″W	Category B	7585	Upload Photo
Powder House				55°21′07″N 4°47′48″W	Category B	7607	Upload Photo
Culzean Estate, Icehouse				55°21′02″N 4°47′52″W	Category C(S)	7611	Upload Photo
Cat Gates (Swinston Gate), Culzean Castle Estate				55°20′42″N 4°47′40″W	Category A	7614	Upload another image See more images
Culzean Kennels				55°20′55″N 4°46′37″W	Category B	7615	Upload Photo
Baltersan Castle				55°20′34″N 4°42′35″W	Category A	7588	Upload another image See more images
Thomaston Castle				55°20′54″N 4°46′39″W	Category B	7590	Upload Photo
Camellia House				55°21′08″N 4°47′23″W	Category A	7597	Upload another image
Walled Gardens And Gardner's Cottage -				55°21′04″N 4°47′30″W	Category B	7612	Upload another image
Kirkoswald, Main Street, K6 Telephone Kiosk				55°19′49″N 4°46′35″W	Category B	7619	Upload Photo
Kirkoswald Parish Church				55°19′44″N 4°46′35″W	Category A	7583	Upload another image
Cottages Known As East Cairn Hill				55°19′49″N 4°46′32″W	Category B	7587	Upload Photo
Aviaries And Swan Cottage				55°20′51″N 4°48′05″W	Category A	7605	Upload Photo
Ruin Of Old Church And Graveyard. Kirkoswald				55°19′48″N 4°46′40″W	Category B	7584	Upload Photo
Circular Building Of Uncertain Purpose Near Dolphin Cottage				55°21′13″N 4°47′36″W	Category B	7610	Upload Photo
Blanefield				55°19′54″N 4°45′19″W	Category B	7617	Upload Photo
Barker, Maidens Harbour				55°20′01″N 4°49′30″W	Category C(S)	7620	Upload Photo
Souter Johnnie's Cottage				55°19′49″N 4°46′33″W	Category A	7586	Upload Photo
Crossraguel Abbey				55°20′19″N 4°43′15″W	Category A	7589	Upload Photo
Bath House				55°21′12″N 4°47′36″W	Category B	7609	Upload Photo
Well-Head Happy Valley				55°21′01″N 4°47′18″W	Category B	7613	Upload Photo
Hoolity Ha' Bridge				55°21′20″N 4°46′32″W	Category A	7604	Upload Photo
Home Farm, Culzean Castle				55°21′21″N 4°46′57″W	Category A	7596	Upload another image
Hoolity Ha' Lodge				55°21′19″N 4°46′32″W	Category A	7603	Upload another image
Dolphin Cottage				55°21′13″N 4°47′34″W	Category B	7608	Upload Photo
Turnberry Hotel				55°18′51″N 4°49′44″W	Category B	7618	Upload Photo

== Key ==
The scheme for classifying buildings in Scotland is:

- Category A: "buildings of national or international importance, either architectural or historic; or fine, little-altered examples of some particular period, style or building type."
- Category B: "buildings of regional or more than local importance; or major examples of some particular period, style or building type, which may have been altered."
- Category C: "buildings of local importance; lesser examples of any period, style, or building type, as originally constructed or moderately altered; and simple traditional buildings which group well with other listed buildings."

In March 2016 there were 47,288 listed buildings in Scotland. Of these, 8% were Category A, and 50% were Category B, with the remaining 42% being Category C.
