= List of listed buildings in Straiton, South Ayrshire =

This is a list of listed buildings in the parish of Straiton in South Ayrshire, Scotland.

== List ==
Name	Location	Date Listed	Grid Ref. (Note: Sometimes known as OSGB36, the grid reference (where provided) is based on the British national grid reference system used by the Ordnance Survey. • "Guide to National Grid". Ordnance Survey. • "Get-a-map". Ordnance Survey.)	Geo-coordinates	Notes	LB Number (Note: Historic Environment Scotland assign a unique alphanumeric identifier to each designated site in Scotland, for listed buildings this always begins with "LB", for example "LB12345".)	Image
Straiton, 6-42(Even Nos) Main Street				55°18′42″N 4°33′07″W	Category C(S)	19091	Upload Photo
Straiton, 1-19(Odd Nos) Main Street				55°18′40″N 4°33′03″W	Category C(S)	19092	Upload Photo
Straiton, Dalmellington Road, K6 Telephone Kiosk				55°18′42″N 4°33′05″W	Category B	19106	Upload Photo
Traboyack House, Former Manse				55°18′37″N 4°32′51″W	Category B	19090	Upload Photo
Blairquhan, Kennels				55°18′59″N 4°34′16″W	Category B	19097	Upload Photo
Parish Church And Graveyard				55°18′41″N 4°33′11″W	Category A	19089	Upload another image
Straiton, Black Bull Hotel				55°18′41″N 4°33′06″W	Category B	19093	Upload Photo
Old Bridge Of Blairquhan				55°18′53″N 4°33′48″W	Category B	19102	Upload Photo
Colonel Hunter Blair's Monument				55°18′12″N 4°32′07″W	Category B	19104	Upload Photo
Balirquhan, Stables				55°18′59″N 4°34′33″W	Category B	19095	Upload Photo
Blairquhan Estate, Girvan Lodge With Gatepiers And Gates				55°18′50″N 4°35′16″W	Category C(S)	19101	Upload Photo
Blairquhan Estate, Milton Lodge With Gatepiers				55°18′53″N 4°33′50″W	Category C(S)	19100	Upload Photo
Blairquhan				55°18′58″N 4°34′39″W	Category A	19094	Upload Photo
Blairquhan Estate, Icehouse				55°18′59″N 4°34′28″W	Category C(S)	19096	Upload Photo
Blairquhan Estate, Walled Garden, Greenhouse And Terrace				55°18′54″N 4°34′25″W	Category C(S)	19099	Upload Photo

== Key ==
The scheme for classifying buildings in Scotland is:

- Category A: "buildings of national or international importance, either architectural or historic; or fine, little-altered examples of some particular period, style or building type."
- Category B: "buildings of regional or more than local importance; or major examples of some particular period, style or building type, which may have been altered."
- Category C: "buildings of local importance; lesser examples of any period, style, or building type, as originally constructed or moderately altered; and simple traditional buildings which group well with other listed buildings."

In March 2016 there were 47,288 listed buildings in Scotland. Of these, 8% were Category A, and 50% were Category B, with the remaining 42% being Category C.
