= List of listed buildings in Tarbolton, South Ayrshire =

This is a list of listed buildings in the parish of Tarbolton in South Ayrshire, Scotland.

== List ==
Name	Location	Date Listed	Grid Ref. (Note: Sometimes known as OSGB36, the grid reference (where provided) is based on the British national grid reference system used by the Ordnance Survey. • "Guide to National Grid". Ordnance Survey. • "Get-a-map". Ordnance Survey.)	Geo-coordinates	Notes	LB Number (Note: Historic Environment Scotland assign a unique alphanumeric identifier to each designated site in Scotland, for listed buildings this always begins with "LB", for example "LB12345".)	Image
Tarbolton, Cunningham Street, Tarbolton Parish Church (Church Of Scotland)				55°30′47″N 4°29′15″W	Category A	14349	Upload another image
Burns' Monument				55°30′17″N 4°26′32″W	Category B	14354	Upload Photo
Tarbolton, Sandgate, Burns Bachelors' Club Including Boundary Wall				55°30′47″N 4°29′11″W	Category A	19689	Upload another image
Lochlea Farm				55°32′23″N 4°27′04″W	Category B	14351	Upload Photo
18 James Street, Daisybank, With Boundary Walls And Ancillary Buildings				55°30′39″N 4°28′57″W	Category B	50056	Upload Photo
Redcraig Viaduct				55°31′01″N 4°24′49″W	Category C(S)	18217	Upload Photo
Neilshill House				55°30′12″N 4°31′13″W	Category A	14355	Upload Photo
Railway Bridge, Near Entrance Lodge, To Montgomerie Policies				55°30′15″N 4°26′53″W	Category B	19690	Upload Photo
Burnfoot Lodge And Bridge				55°30′05″N 4°25′07″W	Category C(S)	14490	Upload Photo
Manse				55°30′47″N 4°29′24″W	Category B	14350	Upload Photo
Auchenfail				55°30′38″N 4°25′06″W	Category B	14352	Upload Photo
Tarbolton, Burns Street, Former Town House And Adjoining Building				55°30′50″N 4°29′11″W	Category C(S)	18211	Upload Photo
Failford Viaduct				55°30′21″N 4°26′45″W	Category C(S)	14353	Upload Photo
20 James Street, Nethercroft				55°30′39″N 4°28′56″W	Category C(S)	50057	Upload Photo
Tarbolton, Cunningham Street, Tarbolton Parish Church Graveyard Including Gatepiers, Gates, Railings And Boundary Wall				55°30′46″N 4°29′15″W	Category B	46528	Upload Photo
52-54 Montgomerie Street, The Former Lorimer Library				55°30′45″N 4°29′08″W	Category C(S)	50058	Upload Photo
Neilshill House, Lodge				55°30′07″N 4°31′20″W	Category B	14356	Upload Photo

== Key ==
The scheme for classifying buildings in Scotland is:

- Category A: "buildings of national or international importance, either architectural or historic; or fine, little-altered examples of some particular period, style or building type."
- Category B: "buildings of regional or more than local importance; or major examples of some particular period, style or building type, which may have been altered."
- Category C: "buildings of local importance; lesser examples of any period, style, or building type, as originally constructed or moderately altered; and simple traditional buildings which group well with other listed buildings."

In March 2016 there were 47,288 listed buildings in Scotland. Of these, 8% were Category A, and 50% were Category B, with the remaining 42% being Category C.
