= Sundrum Castle =

Scottish castle in South Ayrshire

Coordinates: 55.4593°N 4.515°W

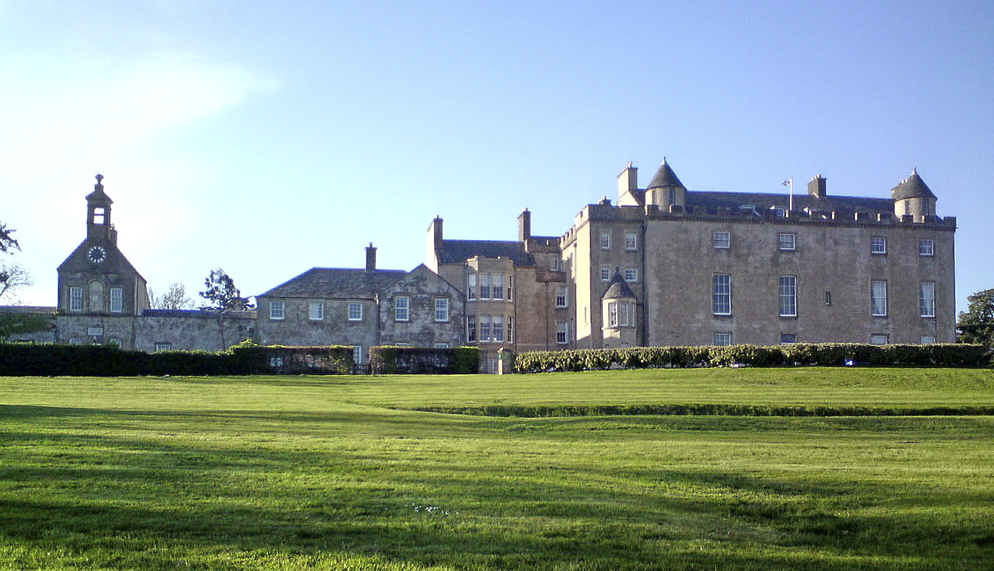

- Location within South Ayrshire
- Type: Castle
- Location: South Ayrshire, Scotland
- OS grid reference: NS 41074 21256

History
- Built: 14th century

Listed Building – Category B
- Official name: Sundrum Castle
- Designated: 14 April 1971
- Reference no.: LB1068

Sundrum Castle is a Scottish medieval castle located 1.5 kilometres (0.93 mi) north of Coylton, South Ayrshire, by the Water of Coyle river. It was built in the 14th century for Sir Duncan Wallace, Sheriff of Ayr. The castle was inherited by Sir Alan de Cathcart, who was the son of Duncan's sister. The Cathcarts sold Sundrum in the 18th century, where it eventually fell into the possession of the Hamilton family. The Hamiltons expanded the castle in the 1790s, incorporating the original keep into a mansion.

The castle was further expanded in the early 20th century by Ernest Coats. For a time it was a hotel, but fell into disrepair. It became a category B listed building in 1971. After extensive renovations in the 1990s, it was split into several privately owned properties.

== History ==
=== 14th to 19th century ===
The name Sundrum is thought to come from the word "sonndruim", meaning "ridge of trees". The tower was at a time thought to have Pictish origins, and Robert Burns had referred to Sundrum as "an ancient Pict-built mansion" in his poem "The Vision" in 1785. However, according to historian A. H. Millar, "this legend rests upon no reasonable foundation".

The original castle was commissioned in the late 14th century by Sir Duncan Wallace, the Sheriff of Ayr, son of Sir Robert Wallace and a relative of William Wallace. The castle was built on land gifted to Sir Duncan by King David II in 1370 and was a rectangular tower. Sir Duncan was married to Eleanor de Brus (now translated as Bruce), but died without a male heir. This theory attempting to link William Wallace to royal blood is debated among historians, and with no surviving charter, no papal dispensation, and no legal record of Eleanor de Brus re-marrying, is likely more Braveheart than Annal.

The great hall of the castle was used for official business, whilst the floor above it was used as a private living space. The Wallaces of Sundrum were in possession of Caprington Castle from the late 14th century to 1400, when a daughter of Sir Duncan married and it passed to the Cunninghams. By the end of the 14th century, Sir Alan de Cathcart took possession of the castle, with the consent of King Robert II of Scotland. Sir Alan was the son of Sir Duncan's sister. Sir Alan had earlier (around 1330) went with James Douglas, Lord of Douglas in an attempt to carry the heart of Robert the Bruce on a crusade, before it was eventually believed to be buried at Melrose Abbey.

Sundrum was owned by the Cathcart family, who had it in their possession for a number of generations. The name Sundrum is linked to the father of Alan Cathcart, 4th Lord Cathcart in the 16th century, who was sometimes known as "Lord Sudram". The fall of Sundrum from Cathcart ownership was alluded to in a poem by Robert Chambers in the 19th century, and by the end of the 20th century was referred to as a curse. The castle was sold by Charles Cathcart, 9th Lord Cathcart to John Murray of Broughton for £18,000. There is some inconsistency over the date it was sold, with sources giving it as 1753 whilst others claim it went straight to the Hamiltons in 1750.

John Hamilton (1739–1821), son of John and Margaret Hamilton, bought the Sundrum estate and the Hamilton family were in possession of the castle from the mid-18th century until 1917. John Hamilton married Lillias Montgomerie (sister of Hugh Montgomerie, 12th Earl of Eglinton) and their combined crests were carved into the fireplace of the great hall. In the 1790s the Hamiltons were responsible for carrying out extensive alterations to the site, including building what is now known the Hamilton Wing. The castle was incorporated into the present mansion in 1792. Designs for interiors in the neo-Gothic style were provided by the architect John Paterson.

Whilst at Sundrum, the family were also involved in reducing the rent of William Burnes, father of the poet Robert Burns. The Hamiltons of Sundrum were heavily involved in both the sugar and slavery industries, including part-owning the Pemberton Valley sugar plantation situated in Jamaica. Profits from slavery are what funded purchase of the castle. After the abolition of slavery in the British West Indies in 1833, Colonel Alexander West Hamilton, son of John Hamilton, arranged for a child from the plantation to be brought to Scotland to obtain schooling and learn a trade. This child, Alexander Waters, learned to be a stone mason, and eventually started his own family settled on the Sundrum estate.

The clock tower was built in 1877 to commemorate the marriage of John Claud Campbell Hamilton (1854–1908) and Marion Hamilton.

=== 20th and 21st century ===
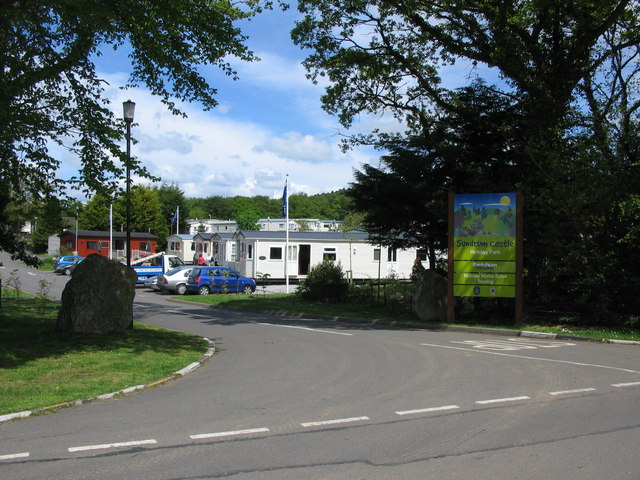
Sundrum Castle Holiday Park

In 1909 the Claud Hamilton Memorial Hall was built in nearby Coylton in memory of one of the Hamilton sons, and designed by A. C. Thompson. In 1917 Sundrum Castle was sold to Ernest Coats, father of John Coats, who ran a thread manufacturing firm. Coats further expanded the castle with the construction of "Coats House", positioned between the mews and the main castle. Sundrum was eventually sold again, this time to a hotel syndicate in 1936. It was turned into a 30-bed hotel, to open around the time of the Empire Exhibition in 1938. On 14 April 1971 it became a category B listed building.

By 1984, Sundrum became neglected, until it was sold to Salopian Estates in 1991. Salopian Estates intended to renovate it as part of an "enabling development" with the building of new houses nearby. The 1990s were a period of great interest in castle restorations, as Sundrum was only one of 26 restorations started in the decade. It has since undergone redevelopment by creating a series of homes. The work was split into three phases – renovation of the Castle Mews, the construction of a nine-house courtyard, and the renovation and division of the main castle itself into three properties. In 2017 an additional courtyard development was opened for sale consisting of 11 houses and was known as The Steadings. Sundrum was also presented an award from the Association for the Protection of Rural Scotland.

The developments were objected to by some of the local residents, as it included the destruction of the original drive and an area of woodland. The developers received £500k from Historic Scotland in 1995, though were thought to have privately profited from the sales of the individual properties. Selected items removed from Sundrum Castle, including archive documents, letters, and some furniture, were made available for sale in 2005, along with items from Pallinsburn House. Some items were provided by Hope Hamilton, a descendant of the Hamiltons of Sundrum.

Wallace Tower, the castle's keep, was owned by landlords Graham and Patricia Cathcart Waddington in 2018. The castle retains its status as a category B listed building. A selection of photographs and documents relating to Sundrum Castle in the 20th century are held at the Ayrshire Archives Headquarters.

== Description ==
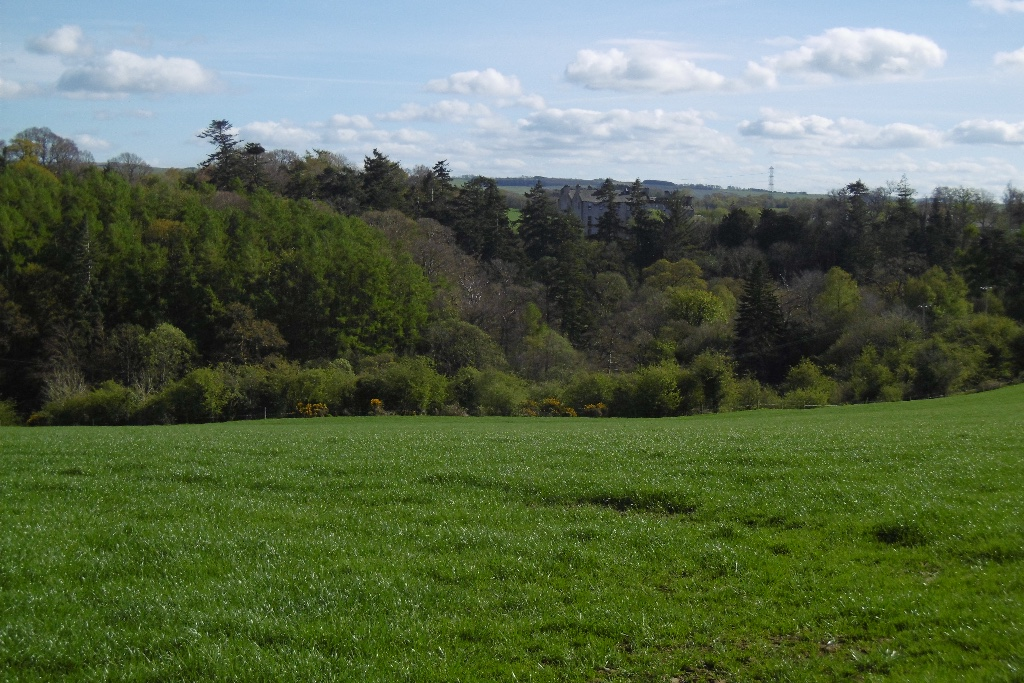
Looking over the hidden Water of Coyle towards the woodlands of Sundrum Castle

Sundrum Castle is located 1.5 kilometres (0.93 mi) north of Coylton, South Ayrshire, Scotland, and sits within an approximately 85 acre estate. It is approximately 9.7 kilometers (6 miles) from Ayr, with Glasgow Prestwick Airport being the closest airport. The castle is split into three separate properties, consisting of the original tower keep, and separate Georgian and Victorian wings, each with their own style, having been renovated in the 1990s. There are also additional mews and other smaller properties on the estate. There is a nearby holiday park.

=== Wallace Tower ===
Wallace Tower is the castle's keep (it is distinct from the similarly named Wallace Tower on the High Street in Ayr, and Wallace's Tower in Roxburgh.) The castle's main walls from the original rectangular tower are 10 to 12 feet thick, and originally only had narrow slits for windows. The entrance was on the north side. There was a small prison pit, which is now sealed off. The tower is said to be haunted by a Green Lady, though it is unknown who it was thought to represent. The ghost however was thought to be "visitor boosting" in the 20th century when the castle was a hotel. The interior includes a Jacobean style dining room (The Laigh Hall) and library on the ground floor, a double-vaulted hall on the first floor, and additional accommodation on the second and third floors. It currently has four bedrooms and three bathrooms, in additional to a rear terrace which overlooks the river valley. It also includes the original guardroom.

=== Hamilton Wing ===
The Hamilton Wing is a Georgian-era addition, built in the late 18th century and named after the Hamilton family. It currently includes four bedrooms, hall, drawing room, dining room, plus main bathroom and kitchen, along with oil-fired central heating.

=== Coats House ===
The Coats House is a Victorian-era addition, built in the early 20th century and named after Ernest Coats. It has an internal area of almost 5000 square feet, with four floors, five reception rooms, including a large drawing room, five bedrooms, and four bathrooms. It also features a sweeping traditional staircase.
