= List of Category A listed buildings in South Ayrshire =

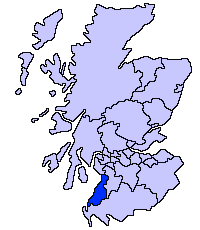
South Ayrshire shown within Scotland

This is a list of Category A listed buildings in the South Ayrshire council area in south-west Scotland.

In Scotland, the term listed building refers to a building or other structure officially designated as being of "special architectural or historic interest". Category A structures are those considered to be "buildings of national or international importance, either architectural or historic, or fine little-altered examples of some particular period, style or building type." Listing was begun by a provision in the Town and Country Planning (Scotland) Act 1947, and the current legislative basis for listing is the Planning (Listed Buildings and Conservation Areas) (Scotland) Act 1997. The authority for listing rests with Historic Scotland, an executive agency of the Scottish Government, which inherited this role from the Scottish Development Department in 1991. Once listed, severe restrictions are imposed on the modifications allowed to a building's structure or its fittings. Listed building consent must be obtained from local authorities prior to any alteration to such a structure. There are approximately 47,400 listed buildings in Scotland, of which around 8% (some 3,800) are Category A.

The council area of South Ayrshire covers 1,222 square kilometres (472 sq mi), and has a population of around 111,700. There are 74 Category A listed buildings in the area.

== Listed buildings ==
Name	Location	Date listed	Geo-coordinates	Notes	LB number	Image
Oswald Hall	Auchincruive Ayr		55°28′42″N 4°33′09″W		99	Upload another image See more images
Dalquharran Castle	Dailly		55°16′59″N 4°43′29″W		125	Upload another image See more images
Kennedy Aisle	Ballantrae		55°05′57″N 5°00′18″W		869	Upload another image See more images
Auchans Castle	Dundonald		55°34′38″N 4°36′41″W		984	Upload another image See more images
Fairlie House	Dundonald		55°35′26″N 4°33′50″W		985	Upload Photo
Lodge, Fairlie House	Dundonald		55°35′16″N 4°33′30″W		987	Upload Photo
Laigh Milton Viaduct	Gatehead, over River Irvine (Note: Also in East Ayrshire, as it crosses the River Irvine which is the council boundary)		55°35′56″N 4°34′02″W		990	Upload another image See more images
Auchincruive Estate, Oswald's Temple (Tea House)	Auchincruive, Ayr		55°28′49″N 4°33′42″W		996	Upload another image See more images
Kildonan House	Barrhill		55°06′38″N 4°46′49″W		1052	Upload another image See more images
Kilkerran House	Dailly		55°17′32″N 4°40′18″W		1114	Upload another image See more images
Drumburle	Dailly		55°17′32″N 4°41′44″W		1119	Upload Photo
Penkill Castle	Old Dailly		55°14′57″N 4°47′01″W		1148	Upload another image See more images
Bargany House	Old Dailly		55°15′54″N 4°45′55″W		1171	Upload another image
Killochan Castle	Old Dailly		55°15′54″N 4°47′30″W		1173	Upload another image See more images
Stables, Killochan Castle	Old Dailly		55°15′55″N 4°47′30″W		1174	Upload Photo
Wallace's Monument	Barnweill, Symington		55°31′36″N 4°37′44″W		4856	Upload another image See more images
3 Grey Gables	Monkton, Southwood Road		55°31′36″N 4°37′44″W		6385	Upload Photo
Ballantrae Windmill	Mill Hill, Ballantrae		55°06′23″N 4°59′43″W		6634	Upload another image See more images
Dovecote, Drumfad	Kirkmichael		55°20′21″N 4°35′08″W		7558	Upload Photo
Kirkoswald Parish Church	Kirkoswald, Kirk Road		55°19′44″N 4°46′35″W		7583	Upload another image See more images
Souter Johnnie's Cottage	Kirkoswald		55°19′49″N 4°46′33″W		7586	Upload another image See more images
Baltersan Castle	Maybole		55°20′34″N 4°42′35″W		7588	Upload another image See more images
Crossraguel Abbey	Maybole		55°20′19″N 4°43′15″W		7589	Upload another image See more images
Culzean Castle	Maybole		55°21′17″N 4°47′22″W		7595	Upload another image See more images
Home Farm, Culzean Castle	Maybole		55°21′21″N 4°46′57″W		7596	Upload another image
Camellia House, Culzean Castle	Maybole		55°21′08″N 4°47′23″W		7597	Upload another image See more images
Hoolity Ha' Lodge, Culzean Castle	Maybole		55°21′19″N 4°46′32″W		7603	Upload another image
Aviaries and Swan Cottage, Culzean Castle	Maybole		55°20′51″N 4°48′05″W		7605	Upload another image
Culzean Castle, Bath House	Maybole		55°21′15″N 4°47′38″W		7609	Upload Photo
Culzean Castle walled garden	Maybole	14 April 1971	55°21′04″N 4°47′29″W		7612	Upload another image
Gate Piers at Swinston Lodge, Culzean Castle	Maybole		55°20′42″N 4°47′40″W		7614	Upload another image See more images
Cassillis Castle	Dalrymple		55°22′52″N 4°37′16″W		13655	Upload another image See more images
Ruined Church of St. Cuthbert	Monkton		55°30′55″N 4°36′07″W		14251	Upload another image See more images
Windmill, Whiteside	Monkton		55°31′07″N 4°35′45″W		14252	Upload another image See more images
Macrae Monument	Monkton		55°31′14″N 4°35′27″W		14253	Upload another image See more images
Newark Castle	Alloway		55°25′17″N 4°39′08″W		14300	Upload Photo
Tarbolton Parish Church	Tarbolton, Cunningham Street		55°30′47″N 4°29′15″W		14349	Upload another image See more images
Neilshill House	Mossblown		55°30′12″N 4°31′13″W		14355	Upload Photo
Parish Church and Graveyard	Symington, Main Street		55°32′59″N 4°33′45″W		14357	Upload another image See more images
Coodham House	Symington		55°33′40″N 4°32′42″W		14368	Upload another image
Straiton Parish Church	Straiton, Main Street		55°18′41″N 4°33′11″W		19089	Upload another image See more images
Blairquhan	Straiton		55°18′58″N 4°34′39″W		19094	Upload another image See more images
Burns Bachelors' Club	Tarbolton, Sandgate Street		55°30′47″N 4°29′11″W		19689	Upload another image
Brig o' Doon	Alloway		55°25′33″N 4°38′12″W		21474	Upload another image See more images
Robert Burns' Cottage	Alloway		55°25′58″N 4°38′00″W		21476	Upload another image See more images
Robert Burns Monument	Alloway		55°25′37″N 4°38′12″W		21477	Upload another image See more images
Auld Brig over River Ayr	Ayr		55°27′52″N 4°37′46″W		21495	Upload another image See more images
Barns House	Ayr, Barns Crescent		55°27′34″N 4°38′00″W		21496	Upload Photo
Ayrshire Management Centre (Craigie House)	Craigie, Ayr		55°27′30″N 4°36′41″W		21556	Upload another image
Holy Trinity Church	Ayr, Fullarton Street		55°27′41″N 4°37′59″W		21586	Upload another image See more images
Auld Kirk of Ayr	Ayr, Kirk Port		55°27′46″N 4°37′43″W		21653	Upload another image See more images
Auld Kirk of Ayr Gateway	Ayr, Kirk Port		55°27′47″N 4°37′45″W		21654	Upload another image
Loudoun Hall	Ayr, Boat Vennal		55°27′53″N 4°37′57″W		21656	Upload another image
1 and 3 New Bridge Street	Ayr		55°27′54″N 4°37′53″W		21689	Upload another image
Town Buildings	Ayr, New Bridge Street		55°27′51″N 4°37′55″W		21692	Upload another image See more images
34 New Bridge Street	Ayr		55°27′51″N 4°37′58″W		21700	Upload Photo
Rozelle House	Ayr		55°26′11″N 4°37′43″W		21763	Upload Photo
Queen's Court House	Ayr, Sandgate		55°27′48″N 4°37′58″W		21777	Upload Photo
22 Sandgate (Lady Cathcart's House)	Ayr		55°27′50″N 4°38′00″W		21788	Upload another image
Savoy Croft	Ayr, Savoy Park		55°27′22″N 4°38′18″W		21795	Upload Photo
Sheriff Court	Ayr, Wellington Square		55°27′41″N 4°38′19″W		21820	Upload another image See more images
Collegiate Church	Maybole, Abbot Street		55°21′12″N 4°40′49″W		37688	Upload another image See more images
Maybole Castle	Maybole		55°21′17″N 4°40′52″W		37709	Upload another image See more images
St John's Cottage	Maybole		55°21′23″N 4°40′13″W		37718	Upload Photo
Mercat Cross	Prestwick		55°30′05″N 4°36′40″W		40328	Upload another image
Salt Pan Houses at St Nicholas Golf Course	Prestwick		55°29′26″N 4°37′24″W		40332	Upload another image
Piersland House Hotel (formerly Piersland Lodge)	Troon, Craigend Road		55°32′02″N 4°38′49″W		42114	Upload Photo
Catholic Church of Our Lady of the Assumption and St Meddan	Troon, St Meddans Street		55°32′42″N 4°39′13″W		42129	Upload another image See more images
St Quivox Parish Church, Mausoleum	St Quivox, Ayr		55°28′59″N 4°34′21″W		47011	Upload another image
St Quivox Parish Church	St Quivox, Ayr		55°29′00″N 4°34′22″W		48638	Upload another image See more images
Culzean Castle Courtyard	Maybole	14 April 1971	55°21′17″N 4°47′19″W		51823	Upload another image
Culzean Castle Estate, Fountain Court	Maybole	14 April 1971	55°21′15″N 4°47′19″W		51824	Upload another image
Culzean Castle Estate, Ruined Arch	Maybole	14 April 1971	55°21′14″N 4°47′13″W		51827	Upload another image
Culzean Castle Estate, Stable Court	Maybole	14 April 1971	55°21′19″N 4°47′16″W		51829	Upload another image

== See also ==
- Scheduled monuments in South Ayrshire
