= Scheduled monuments in South Ayrshire =

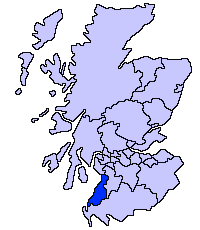
South Ayrshire shown within Scotland

A scheduled monument in Scotland is a nationally important archaeological site or monument which is given legal protection by being placed on a list (or "schedule") maintained by Historic Environment Scotland. The aim of scheduling is to preserve the country's most significant sites and monuments as far as possible in the form in which they have been inherited.

The process of scheduling is governed by the Ancient Monuments and Archaeological Areas Act 1979, which aims "to make provision for the investigation, preservation and recording of matters of archaeological or historical interest". The term "scheduled monument" can apply to the whole range of archaeological sites which have been deliberately constructed by human activity but are not always visible above ground. They range from prehistoric standing stones and burial sites, through Roman remains and medieval structures such as castles and monasteries, to later structures such as industrial sites and buildings constructed for the World Wars. Some buildings or structures which were both scheduled and listed have had their listing designations removed to reduce the duplication.

In 2017 there were 8238 scheduled monuments in Scotland.

== Notable Scheduled Monuments in South Ayrshire ==
Name	Location	Description	Ref No	Image
Alloway Kirk	Alloway	Ruined church which features in Burn's poem Tam o' Shanter	SM308	
Ardstinchar Castle	Ballantrae	Ruined medieval castle	SM311	
Craigie Castle	Craigie	Remains of medieval castle	SM315	
Dalquharran Old Castle	Dailly	Remnants of old 15th-century castle	SM316	
Bencallen Hill Cairn	Barr	Prehistoric chambered cairn	SM3890	
Old Parish Church, Prestwick	Prestwick	Ruins of 12th/13th-century St Nicholas church	SM5883	
Dunure Castle and Dovecot	Maybole	Ruined medieval castle and 16th-century dovecot	SM6105	
Crossraguel Abbey	Kirkoswald	Extensive remains of the 13th-century Cluniac Abbey	SM90087	
Dundonald Castle	Dundonald	Castle rebuilt by King Robert II	SM90112	
Maybole Collegiate Church	Maybole	Remains of the collegiate church of St Mary	SM90212	

== See also ==
- List of Category A listed buildings in South Ayrshire
