= Abbot of Crossraguel =

The Abbot of Crossraguel was the leader of the Cluniac monastic community of Crossraguel Abbey, near Maybole in Carrick, south-west Scotland. It was founded in 1260s by Donnchadh mac Gille Brigte, earl of Carrick with monks from Paisley Abbey. Owing to the lack of surviving records and its distance from the core of Lowland Scotland in the western Gàidhealtachd, few of the abbots are known by name. The abbots were replaced by commendators in the 16th century, and the abbey came to an end when its lands were taken over by the bishops of Dunblane in 1617.

The royal warrant in 1886 which revived the office of Dean of the Chapel Royal also gave the Dean the titles of Abbot of Crossraguel and Abbot of Dundrennan.

The following is a list of abbots and commendators:

== List of known abbots ==
- Patrick, 1274 x 1292
- Nicholas, 1370-1386 x 1400
- nearly a century without a known abbot
- Roger, fl. 1370
- Roland, 1414-1433
- John de Lithgow, 1414-1415
- Colin Kennedy, 1460-1490
- Robert Whitehead, 1491-1492 (The Charters of the Abbey of Crossraguel (1886) suggest his name was Whytefoord, a prominent family name in Carrick)
- David Blair (Blane), 1498-1504 (The Charters of the Abbey of Crossraguel (1886) suggest his name was Chalmer, a monk of the abbey)
- David Kinghorn, 1509-1521
- William Kennedy, 1520-1547
- Quintin Kennedy, 1548-1564

The dissolution of monasteries then caused a cessation of true abbots in the functional sense.

- Peter Hewat, December 1612 - From 1600 King James VI of Scotland (later James I of England) was set on reducing the power of the church and he met with the Earl of Gowrie at Gowrie House in Perth, Scotland. The king claimed he was lured to the house to be killed – a treasonable offence – However the Gowrie connections claim the king owed Gowrie a large sum of money and the king wanted rid of Gowrie. The result of the meeting was that Gowrie and his brother were slain by the king’s page. The king’s story was not believed by the clergy and they refused to endorse the charges of treason against the late Earl of Gowrie and his brother. All the clergy, except for Peter Hewat, who sided with the king, were dismissed. It seemed that this stance gained Peter favour with the king, who in 1612 gave him the Abbacy at Crossraguel which in turn gave him a seat in the Parliament and membership of the Court of High Commission.

== List of pensioners and commendators ==
- George Buchanan (pensioner), 1564-1577
- Alan Stewart (commendator/abbot), 1565-1587
- John Vaus of Barnbarroch (commendator), 1587-1612
- Peter Hewat (commendator), 1612-1628

== Bibliography ==
- Cowan, Ian B. & Easson, David E., Medieval Religious Houses: Scotland With an Appendix on the Houses in the Isle of Man, Second Edition, (London, 1976), pp. 63–4
- Watt, D.E.R. & Shead, N.F. (eds.), The Heads of Religious Houses in Scotland from the 12th to the 16th Centuries, The Scottish Records Society, New Series, Volume 24, (Edinburgh, 2001), pp. 47–9
- Hunter Blair, F.C. ed. (1886) Charters of the Abbey of Crossraguel,(1886) 2 vols, Edinburgh: Ayrshire & Galloway Archæological Association

== See also ==
- Crossraguel Abbey
