= Charter Stones =

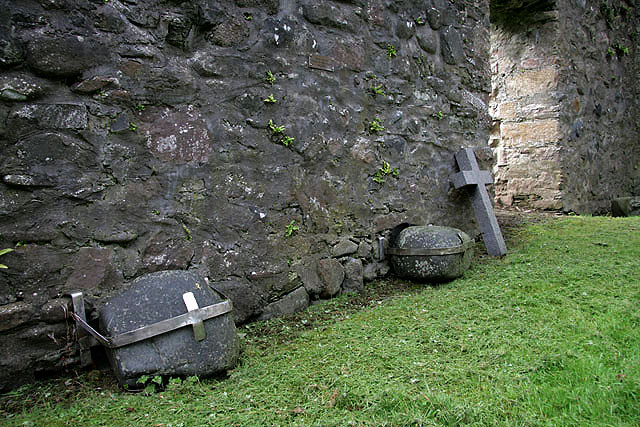
The Old Dailly Charter Stone is the larger of the two.

Charter Stones are large stone monuments that date back to ancient times when such stones were granted to individuals or communities in lieu of written charters to signify the granting of land by the crown, feudal overlords or other individuals. They were used to record ownership of land before written documents came into general use.

== Characteristics of Charter Stones ==
The stones were sometimes engraved or were instead distinctive in terms of colour, composition or shape. The use of these stones may relate to the common practice of using boundary stones to establish precise limits to areas of land ownership but differ in that the proof of the land ownership was invested in them. Being stone they had a permanence that gave them an advantage over charters written on vellum, etc. An essential element was that the stone in question had once belonged to the donor and was next held by the grantee. The size, weight and individuality of charter stones helped to ensure that they were not easily stolen or moved any significant distance.

== Surviving examples ==
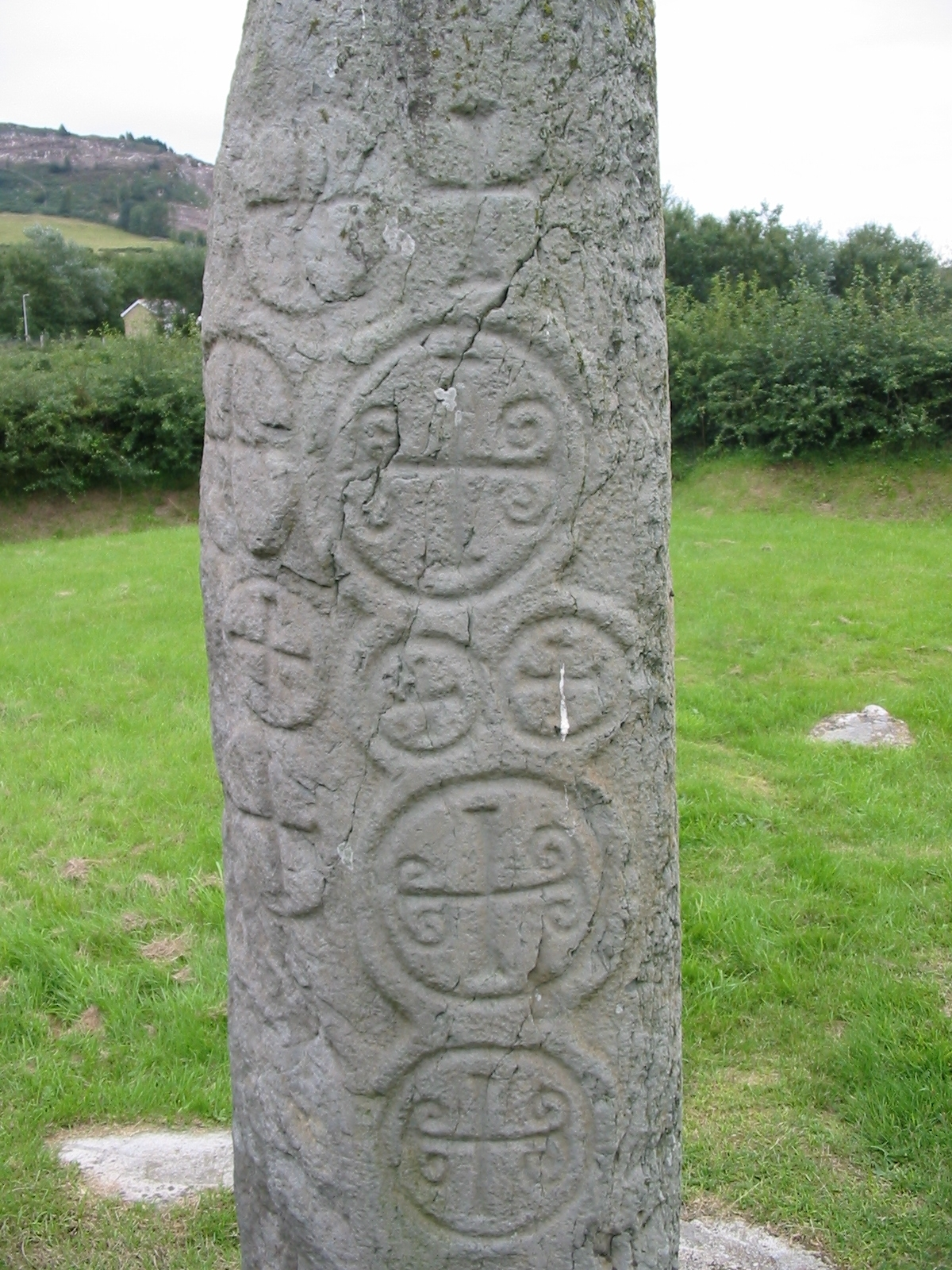
The Kilnasaggart Charter Stone.

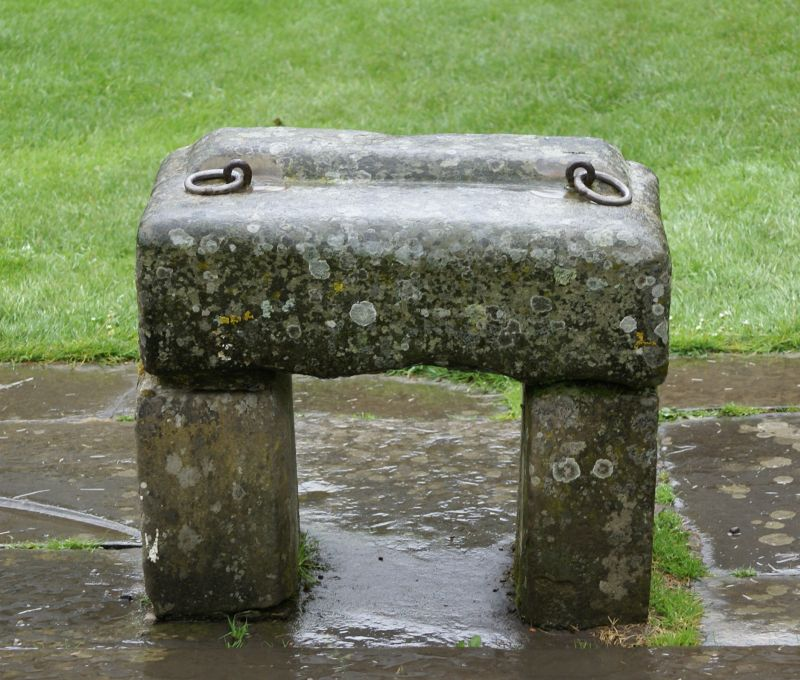
Replica of the Stone of Scone.

In Old Dailly a tradition has it that when worship was discontinued at the old kirk in 1695 the people of Dailly insisted that the 'Blue stone' or charter stone should be removed from the old kirk to the new parish church. The people of Old Dailly refused to part with their ancient stone and in his historical notes located in Sir Walter Scott’s “Lord of The Isles”, he records this conflict in Dailly parish and notes that it was settled ‘when man, woman and child from both communities marched out and by one desperate engagement put an end to the conflict’. The inhabitants of Old Dailly triumphed and the 'Blue Stone' still resides in the old churchyard. Old Dailly is sometimes recorded as the 'Blue Stone Burgh'. Smith in 1895 mentions charter stones plural and suggests that the tradition of trials of strength, in common with the 'Leper's Charter Stone' at Prestwick, was linked with proof that the person granted the land involved was mature enough to hold it.

At the Bruce's Well, Kingcase in Prestwick, records describe the Lepers' Charter Stone as being the shape of a sheep's kidney, formed of basalt, blue in colour and as smooth as glass. It weighed around 15 stones or 95 Kilograms and its weight was such that it could only be lifted with arms extended and cupped in a cavity in the stone. Lifting it was considered proof of the passage to manhood. Sources state that some English dragoons encamped one night at Bruce's Well where the charter stone was kept and somehow managed to break it. The pieces were collected and carefully kept by the freemen of Prestwick and later incorporated into the consolidated walls of the old St Ninian's Chapel (see video). Another source states that "... a low character of the name of Allison, who rented a salt-pan in the neighbourhood, about the year 1800 bribed a drunk man, who broke the stone in pieces."

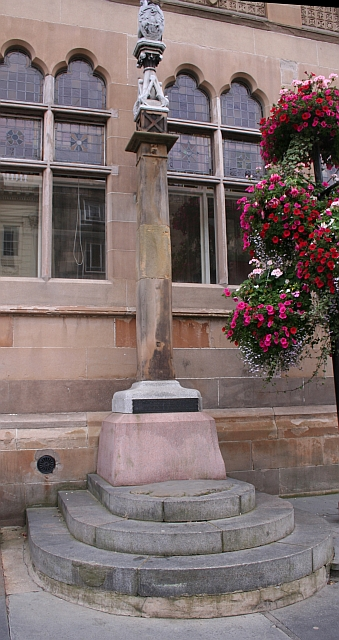
The Old Inverness Market cross and Clach na Cudainn Charter Stone

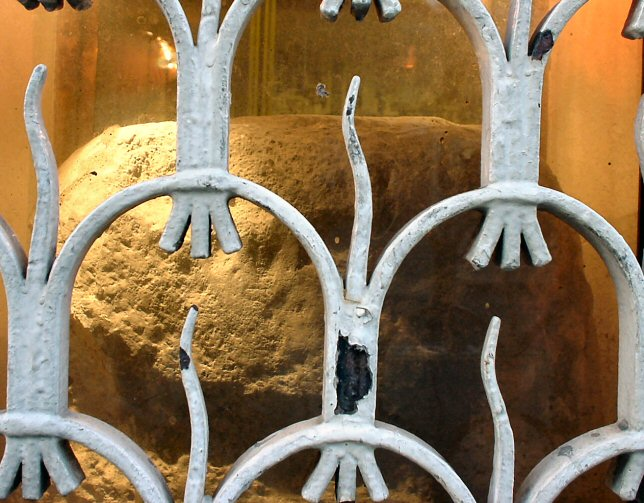
The London Stone

The Clach na Cudainn (Gaelic for 'stone of the tub') or Charter Stone of Inverness was kept in the market place, set in a frame and bound with iron. Also known as the Clachnacuddin Stone it is said that as long as the stone is preserved then Inverness will flourish. The upper surface was supposedly worn flat by the action of women resting their tubs or pails on it whilst they rested.

Near Blair Atholl at Pitagowan in Perthshire the Clach na h-Iobairt (the stone of offering) or 'Bridge of Tilt' standing stone is said to be a charter stone that records a land grant, possibly to the Church of Kilmaveonaig.

The Stone of Scone was regarded as being the charter stone of the Kingdom of Scotland.

In Wales charter stones are recorded from Llanllyr in Merioneth (circa 8th century) and Merthyr Mawr (11th century) and Ogmore (11th century) in Glamorgan. The example at Merthyr Mawr carries the inscription "in grefium in propium" which translates literally as "ownership was registered" and commemorates St Glywys. The Ogmore charter stone also honours St Glywys and records a Bishop Fili who was the grantee of an ager, a field.

In England the ancient London Stone has been put forward as a charter stone due to its proximity to lands once held by Canterbury Cathedral. The Kirkby Stephen charter stone in Cumbria is till used on St Luke’s Fair day in October for the reading of the market's charter. Also in Cumbria is the Ca'an Stone in the main street of Kendal, once part of the market cross, but possibly older and once used as a place where proclamations were read.

A possible example has been recorded at Stoke near Hartland in North Devon.

In Ireland's County Armagh an eighth century example of a charter stone is recorded at Kilnasaggart.

In the Isle of Man it is recorded that it was common for charter stones to be given as a sign of transfer of ownership, the stone itself once having been the property of the donor.

== Micro-history ==
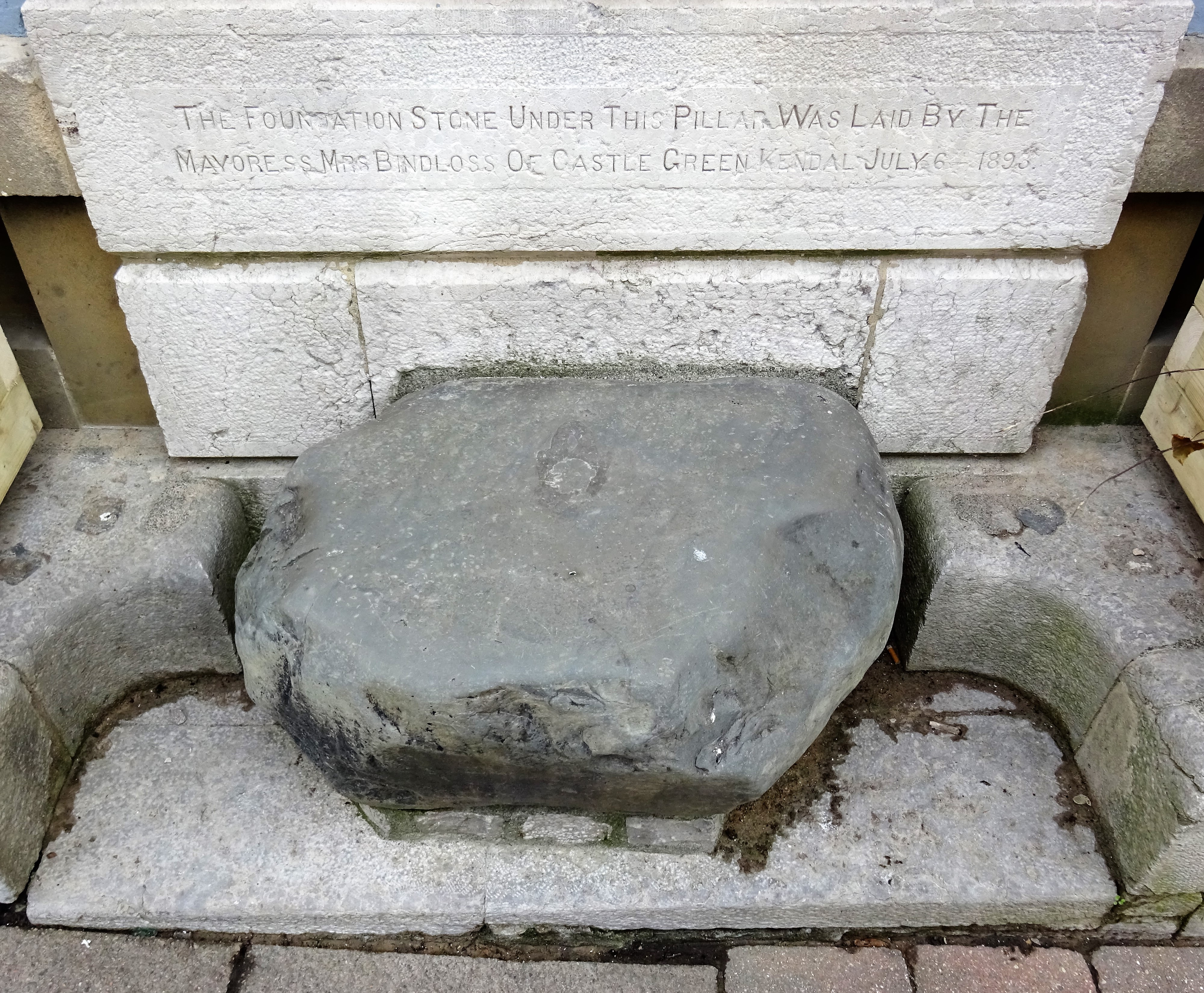
The Kendal Ca' Stone

Records show that before the Norman conquest other items that once belonged to the donor of property were given in lieu of a written charter, such as swords, helmets and especially horns.

Tradition has it that charter stones are sometimes possessed with special powers such as bringing good luck to those who touch them and in some cases they can supposedly cure certain illness, etc. The Old Dailly stone is said to have held the right of being a sanctuary stone.

The larger of the two Old Dailly charter stones weighs between 20 and 23 stone (130 and 150 kg) and the smaller between 18.5 and 20 stone (117 and 127 kg) and like the old Lepers' charter stone at Prestwick is smooth and their shape make them difficult to grip them easily and over the years they became a weight lifting challenge. In international stone lifting circles the name The Big Blue was the name given to the largest Old Dailly stone as a ‘lifting’ or ‘testing’ stone however the local council have bound both with metal hoops and they cannot at present be lifted.

== See also ==
- Artisanal food
- Charter
- Charter fairs
- History of marketing
- List of Renaissance fairs
- Market town
- Marketing
- Market (place)
- Market hall
- Merchant
- Retail
- Town privileges
