= Reekie =

Reekie may refer to:

== People ==
- David Reekie, English glass sculptor
- Jack Reekie (1871-1963), Australian rules footballer
- Jemma Reekie (born 1998), Scottish middle-distance runner
- Joe Reekie (born 1965), Canadian ice hockey player
- John Reekie (1829-1885), Scottish photographer, see Photographers of the American Civil War
- Jonathan Reekie (born 1964), British arts administrator
- Nicholas Reekie, New Zealand sex offender, see David Dougherty
- Rosalind Reekie-May (born 1972), New Zealand racing cyclist
- Stella Jane Reekie (1922–1982), British missionary and humanitarian

== Places ==
- Auld Reekie, a nickname for Edinburgh, see Etymology of Edinburgh
- Reekie Linn, a waterfall in Angus, Scotland

== Other ==
- Auld Reekie Roller Derby, an Edinburgh-based roller derby league
- Neu!Reekie!, an Edinburgh-based publisher and performing arts promoter
