= St Colm's College =

Coordinates: 55°57′47″N 3°12′20″W

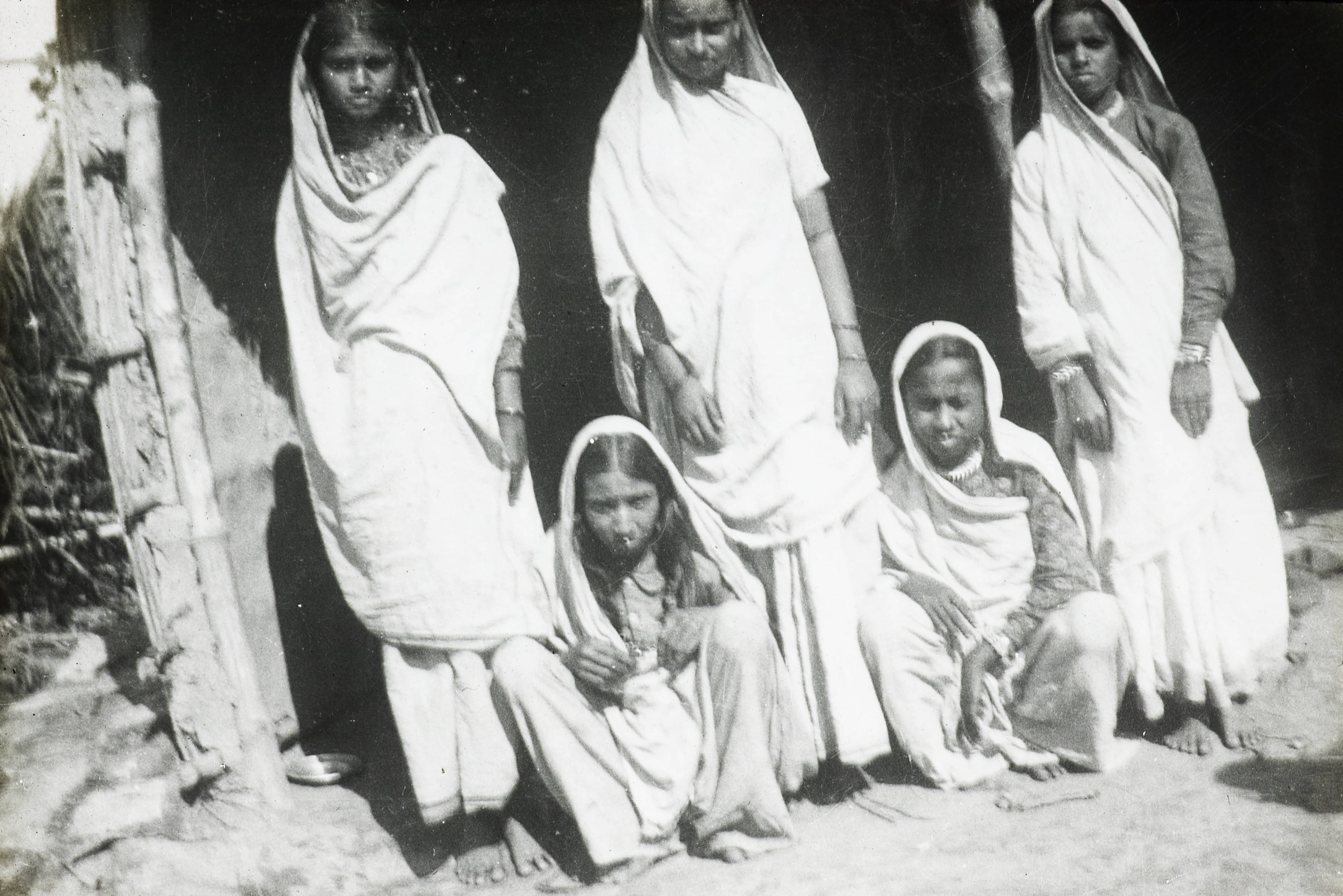
In India, missions work with high caste women often happened within zenanas (women's quarters)

St Colm's College was established in Edinburgh in 1894 as a missionary training college for women, with Annie Hunter Small as its first principal.

In 1908 the training college moved to the site at 23 Inverleith Terrace Edinburgh, opening in 1909 and then in 1910 the College hosted most of the global leaders attending the World Missionary Conference held in Edinburgh, most notably V.S.Azariah.

In 1998, when the College was about to be sold by the Church of Scotland, it was rescued through a last minute plan developed by Scottish Churches World Exchange. The plan, developed by Robert Anderson and Lynn Whitehead who led World Exchange, was to turn the building on its head, and swop from sending missionaries to receiving students from the global south who were studying in Edinburgh and creating a supportive international environment for them. It was renamed St Colm's International House and this project ran from 1998 through to 2010. During this time the House also ran English language and Negotiating Skills courses for emerging women leaders from the global south.

In August 2010, the College's property would eventually be sold off after the Church of Scotland determined it could no longer afford to maintain it.

== Various names ==
The College was first established in October 1894 as the Women's Missionary Training Institute as part of the Free Church of Scotland. After the Free Church merged with the United Presbyterian Church to form the new United Free Church of Scotland, the College would be renamed as the Women's Missionary College in 1908. Subsequent to this, the United Free Church of Scotland would merge with the Church of Scotland in 1929, and the College would once again be renamed as the Church of Scotland Women's Missionary College. In 1960, the Church of Scotland would rename it St Colm's College. By 1998, it would be renamed St Colm's International House and used as accommodations for students from the majority world.

== Training ==
Much of the vision of training at St Colm's was driven by the work of its first principal, Annie Hunter Small, a Scot and a former Zenana missionary worker in India. Teaching for the College brought together a mixture of theoretical and practical skills, and many of the female students enrolled in classes at New College.

Women trained at the College would come from a variety of denominational backgrounds and eventually work in the Scottish Highlands and amongst Jewish communities, but also overseas in Africa, China, and India.

== List of teachers at St Colm's ==
- Mary Lusk (1958–1963)
- Kenneth Mackenzie (1957–1968)
- Annie H. Small (1894–1913)
- Olive Wyon (1950s)

== List of students at St Colm's ==
- Jessie Buie Brown (c. 1897)
- Evangeline Edwards (c. 1913)
- Mary Lusk (1940s)
- Jane Haining (1932)
- Anne Hepburn (late 1940s)
- Ruth Livingstone Wilson (before 1914)
- Elizabeth Mantell (1966)
- Stella Jane Reekie (1949–1951)
- Marjorie Saunders (1965–1968)
- Prof Chris Riffel (2008-2010)

== See also ==
- Church of Scotland
- Zenana missions
