= Anne Hepburn =

Scottish missionary (1925–2016)

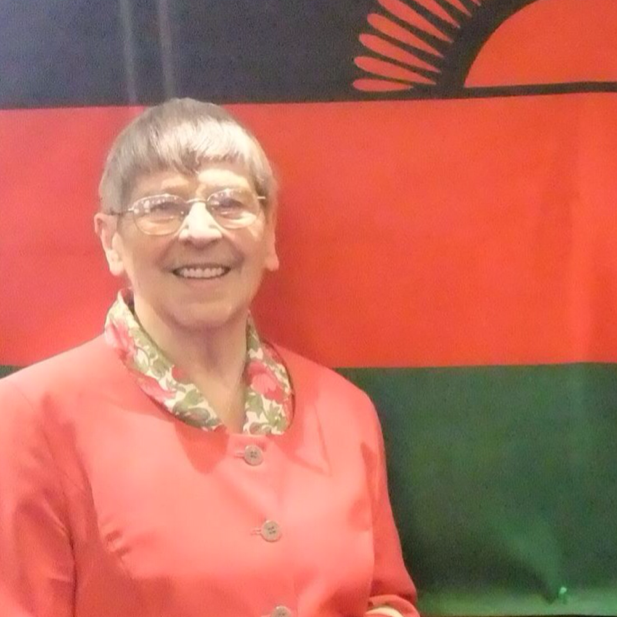
- from the Scotland Malawi Partnership
- Born: 20 August 1925; Dailly, South Ayrshire
- Died: 29 July 2016 (aged 90); Marie Curie Hospice, Edinburgh
- Education: University of Glasgow, Jordanhill College
- Known for: Motherhood of God, Scottish Malawi Network, President of Church Scotland Women's Guild, Elder of the Church of Scotland

Anne Hepburn (20 August 1925 – 29 July 2016) was a Church of Scotland missionary and a teacher, feminist and social justice advocate. She served as National President of the Church of Scotland's Women's Guild in the early 1980s, where she led the debate on the issue of the "Motherhood of God".

== Early life and education ==
Anne Burton was born in Dailly, South Ayrshire on 20 August 1925. Her mother died when she was a child of eighteen months, and she grew up with her blacksmith father, who was also a church elder. She went onto study at Glasgow University, before training as a teacher at Jordanhill. When she graduated, she taught at a small village school in the village of Barr for three years before applying to the Women's Foreign Mission Committee of the Church of Scotland. She was accepted for training at St Colm's College, a Church of Scotland college.

== Mission work ==
In 1950 Anne Burton was sent to Malawi, then called Nyasaland, as headmistress of a mission primary school for girls. She met her future husband, fellow missionary James Lamb (Hamish) Hepburn, first at a Church of Scotland weekend in Galashiels and later on the voyage to Malawi and in August 1954 they married. Their three children Catherine, Margaret and Kenneth were born in Malawi. The political struggles that began in 1959 against the planned Central African Federation resulted in independence for Nyasaland, but an uncertain climate for those who opposed the new regime. In 1964, when on furlough in Scotland, the Hepburns were advised not to return to Malawi.

In the 1990s she was involved in the creation of the Scottish Malawi Network and she was its convener for ten years. The network's role was later fulfilled by the Scotland Malawi Partnership.

== Life in the Church ==
Anne Hepburn settled in Kirkcudbright, Dumfries & Galloway, where her husband Hamish became minister. Anne was active in the Women's Guild, serving as National Vice-president from 1972 to 1975, and she was ordained as an elder of the Church of Scotland in 1974. In 1981, Hepburn became National President of the Women's Guild.

== Motherhood of God controversy ==
In her opening remarks to the 1982 April annual meeting of the Women's Guild, Anne Hepburn decided to use a prayer written by the Rev. Brian Wren which addressed "God our Mother" (the original typewritten script is in the New College Library Archives. The prayer caused audible upset, and the many letters of complaint which followed fed the "Motherhood of God" controversy.

Nevertheless, this first step was followed by the creation of a study by the General Assembly of the Church of Scotland to study the theological implications of the Motherhood of God. But when this group reported back to the General Assembly, the topic was shelved. Nevertheless, the discussion continued around the world.

== Works ==
- Her "God, our mother" speech
- Hepburn, Anne (2011). Memories of Malawi and Scotland. Edinburgh: Anne Hepburn. OCLC 768071289.
