= Dalquharran Castle =

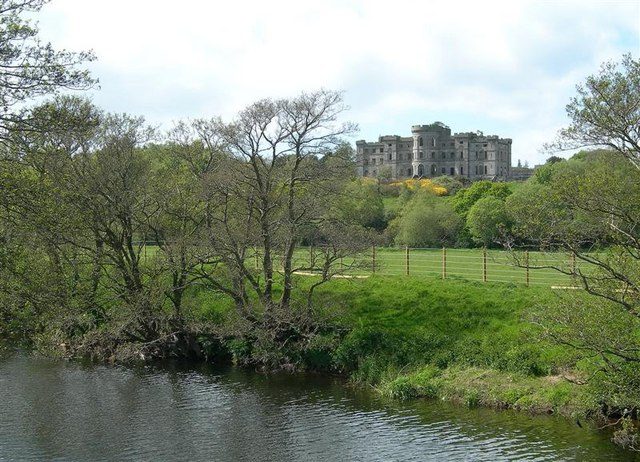
- View from the south

- Location within South Ayrshire
- 55.2831°N 4.7246°W
- Location: Dailly, South Ayrshire, Scotland; UK grid reference NS 270021

History
- Built: 1790
- Built for: Thomas Kennedy

Site notes
- Architect: Robert Adam

Listed Building – Category A
- Designated: 14 April 1971
- Reference no.: LB125

Scheduled monument
- Official name: Dalquharran Castle (Old Castle)
- Type: Secular: castle
- Designated: 28 June 1935
- Reference no.: SM316

Dalquharran Castle is a category A listed building in South Ayrshire, Scotland, designed by Robert Adam and completed around 1790. The first recorded lord of the property which already included a castle, was Gilbert Kennedy, as stated in a 1474 Charter for the nearby Crossraguel Abbey; the estate was later owned by the Kennedy family for centuries.

== Location and origins ==
The property lies near the village of Dailly, a few miles inland from the Firth of Clyde between Girvan and Turnberry on the western coast of Scotland, about 16 miles (26 km) southwest of Ayr. The estate includes two "castles", the old one abandoned around 1800 and the new one, actually a mansion, which was habitable until the 1960s. The south façade of the new castle overlooks the north bank of the Water of Girvan. One recent report states, "This property [completed in 1790] should not be confused with the ruined Old Dalquharran Castle which stands nearby". The new castle is also now a ruin since the roof was removed to avoid local taxation in 1967.

== 17th and 18th centuries ==
The estate, including the old castle, was purchased in the late 17th century by Sir Thomas Kennedy of Kirkhill, Lord Provost of Edinburgh, and occupied by his son Thomas Kennedy of Dunure. Over the years, the old castle has also been known as Dalqhrin, Dahuharra Castle, Old Place of Dalwharn, Dolquharran. Kennedy of Kirkhill also bought Dunure Castle and its estate. Thomas Kennedy of Dunure was the husband of Robert Adam's sister, and Adam designed a new castle for him as a country mansion, during around 1785 to 1790.

The castle was arranged symmetrically around a central entrance hall, with top-lit central spiral staircase similar to Culzean Castle, which Adam designed for David Kennedy from around 1776. The house has four floors, with bedchambers in the two floors. The interior was decorated in a classical style. Services were located in the basement. A round bastion turret in the south front contains a drawing room on the ground floor, with library above, with views over Girvan Water. A large oval dining room occupies the east wing on the ground floor.

When the castle was completed in 1790, Thomas Kennedy moved out of the old castle which was abandoned and stands in ruins nearby, about 300 metres (980 ft) southeast, closer to the river. Dalquharran Castle (Old Castle) became a listed monument in 1935 as "the remains of the old castle of Dalquharran, surviving as substantial standing structures and as buried archaeology, together with an area enclosing the outer defences and infrastructure". That report states that it was "originally a rectangular keep ... greatly enlarged and converted into a "stately castle" in about 1679".

To the north of the castle, Adam designed a long low stable range connected at either end to the main building by screen walls with gateways, creating a forecourt. The outbuildings were constructed in a simpler style than originally designed by Adam, possible after his death in 1792, with several small lodges arranged symmetrically around the court.

== 19th, 20th and 21st centuries ==
The castle was extended from 1880–1881 by Francis Thomas Romilly Kennedy, grandson of Thomas Kennedy who died in 1819; he needed space to accommodate his wife and their nine children. Wings were added in a similar style, designed by Wardrop and Reid of Edinburgh. (Note: Other sources suggest the extensions were undertaken by Walker and Son of Belgravia.) The cost of the extensions almost bankrupted the family, and from the late 19th century the castle and estate were frequently let. In the winter of 1904–1905, the castle was rented by H. H. Asquith. Ettie Grenfell records a family weekend there in her journal, and a recent biographer of the novelist John Buchan, a friend of Asquith's son, Raymond, suggests Dalquharran as the inspiration for the house Huntingtower, in Buchan's novel of 1922. Asquith's daughter, Violet Bonham Carter recorded her impressions of the castle in a diary entry for 5 August 1905: "Oh for Dalquharran with its Raeburns and ruins and long green garden full of clematis! and the fishless stream and the beech trees!"

The property was sold by the Kennedy family in the 1930s to a timber merchant who leased the castle to the Scottish Youth Hostel Association from 1936 to 1939. It was occupied by the evacuated Glasgow Deaf and Dumb Institution during the Second World War. During the war, the estate was sold to John Stewart, a produce merchant, who occupied the new castle with his family and farmed the estate. The castle was eventually abandoned, as it was too large and expensive to maintain. The lead roof was removed in 1967 so the owners could declare it as uninhabitable and avoid paying rates.

The castle was designated a category A listed building in 1971, its listing describing it as "a castle-style mansion by Robert Adam, circa 1790". The interiors were in good condition in the late 1960s, but photographs published in early 2017 confirmed that the interiors were in total ruin; entry into the building was prohibited for safety reasons.

Outline planning permission was granted in 1990 for an ambitious redevelopment, with two golf courses, a hotel, conference centre, country club, and hundreds of holiday homes. No progress was made. The property was sold to developers in 2001; further permissions were granted in 2004 and then again in 2009 for less ambitious schemes to convert the castle into a hotel. Consent was sought to build 60 dwellings and five fractional houses on the estate in June 2014. This request was conditionally approved; by that time, there was no mention of the old plan to convert the castle to a hotel. None of the buildings planned since 1990 were ever constructed.

In June 2019, the entire 261-acre estate was put up for sale at a guide price of £800,000. The owner of the property was Kezia DCM Ltd, a property development company. The property was listed as including "medieval ruins of Dalquharran Castle and the striking Dalquharran Mansion House, productive farmland, mature woodland and a number of smaller development opportunities". The latter may refer to the various derelict and semi-derelict buildings, including the remnants of a cottage and former byre, the stable, stone farmhouse and stone outbuildings.

== Gallery ==
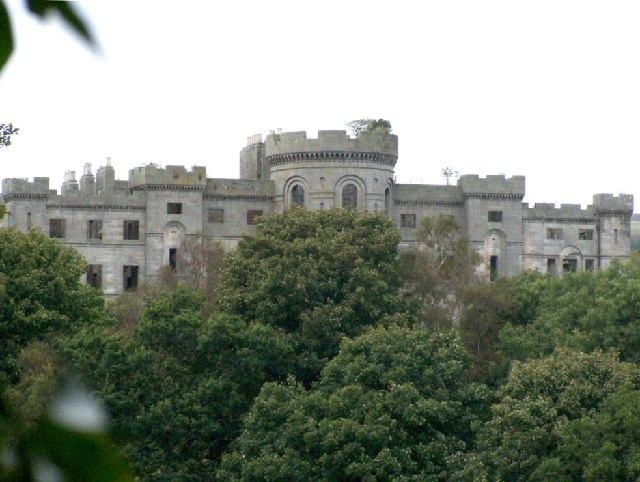
South front

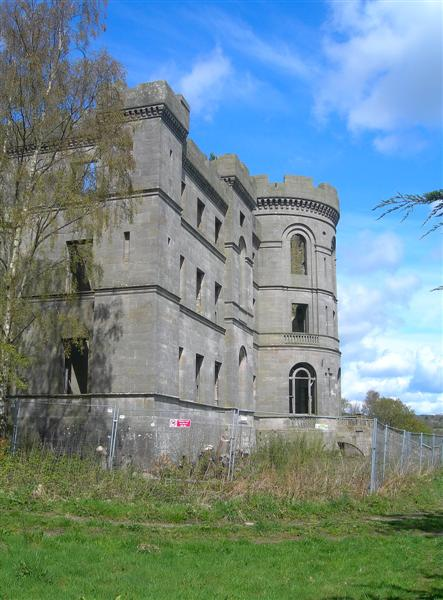
South front

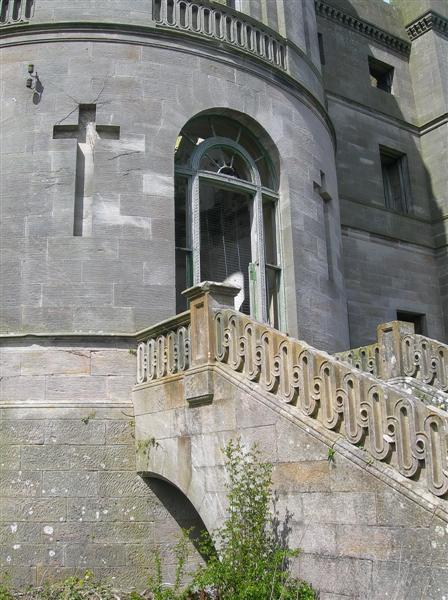
Doorway from the drawing room, in the south front

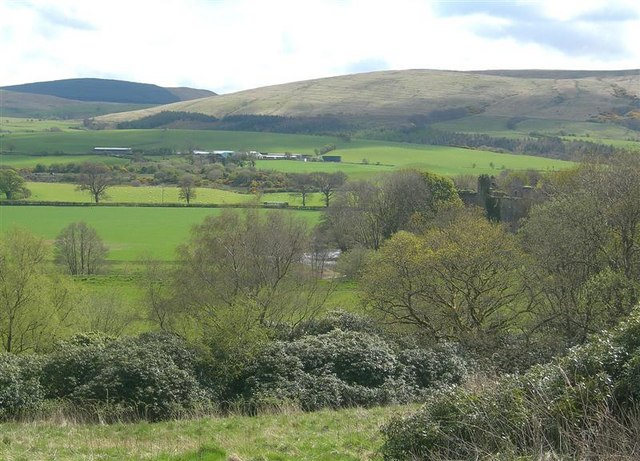
Ruins of Old Dalquharran Castle nearer the river

== Sources ==
- Bonham Carter, Violet (1997) [1996]. Mark Bonham Carter; Mark Pottle (eds.). Lantern Slides: 1904–1914. The Diaries and Letters of Violet Bonham Carter. London: Orion Books. ISBN 9781857998603. OCLC 37466969.
- Buchan, John (2008) [1922]. Huntingtower. Oxford World Classics. Oxford, UK: Oxford University Press. ISBN 9780199537860.
- Close, Rob; Riches, Anne (2012). Ayrshire and Arran. The Buildings of Scotland. Newhaven and London: Yale University Press. ISBN 9780300141702.
- Grenfell, Ettie (1916). Pages From A Family Journal, 1888-1915. Eton, Royal Berkshire, UK: Spottiswoode Ballantyne. OCLC 933101105.
