= Madge Saunders =

Jamaican Christian minister and community worker

The Reverend Madge Saunders
- Born: 25 February 1913; Galina, Saint Mary Parish, Jamaica
- Died: 2 March 2009 (aged 96); Jamaica
- Education: Bethlehem Moravian College; St Colm's College
- Known for: First female parish minister in the United Church in Jamaica and the Cayman Islands
- Relatives: Kyle Spence (great-nephew) Douglas Anthony Clive Saunders (nephew)

Marjorie Prentice "Madge" Saunders (25 February 1913 – 2 March 2009) was a Jamaican Christian minister and community worker. She was the first woman in the United Church in Jamaica and the Cayman Islands to serve as a parish minister.

Saunders grew up in Galina, Saint Mary Parish, the sixth of seven children born to Ida (née Myers) and Walter E. Saunders. Her mother died when she was young, while her father worked as a wharfinger. Saunders attended Free Hill School in Port Maria, and began working as pupil-teacher in Galina at the age of 14. She went on to study teaching at Bethlehem Moravian College, and then worked as a primary school teacher. Saunders was a member of the Presbyterian Church of Jamaica, and eventually decided to pursue the ministry. From 1965 to 1968 she studied at St Colm's College in Edinburgh, Scotland, and on her return to Jamaica was made a deaconess and employed as the church's first full-time youth organiser. In that capacity she travelled around the country, establishing several new schools including Mona Preparatory and Meadowbrook High School, and also made visits to the Cayman Islands and Haiti.

In 1965, Saunders accepted an invitation from the Presbyterian Church of England to serve a mission in England, becoming associate minister of St. James Presbyterian Church, Sheffield. The city had a large Afro-Caribbean population, particularly in the area around Burngreave where she lived. Saunders established various programs to help new arrivals, and authored a book, Living in Britain, which was subsequently translated into Gujarati and Urdu. She also served as a spokesperson for the West Indian community, appearing several times on BBC Radio Sheffield. Saunders returned to Jamaica in 1975 and was ordained as a minister in the new United Church (into which the Presbyterian Church had merged). She was assigned to the Salem United Church in Saint Mary, the first woman to take charge of an entire congregation – Adlyn White had been ordained in 1973, but worked in administrative roles. A biography of Saunders, Born to Serve, was published in 2005. She died in March 2009, aged 96.
