= Hew Ainslie =

Scottish poet (1792–1878)

Hew Ainslie (5 April 1792 – 11 March 1878) was a Scottish poet.

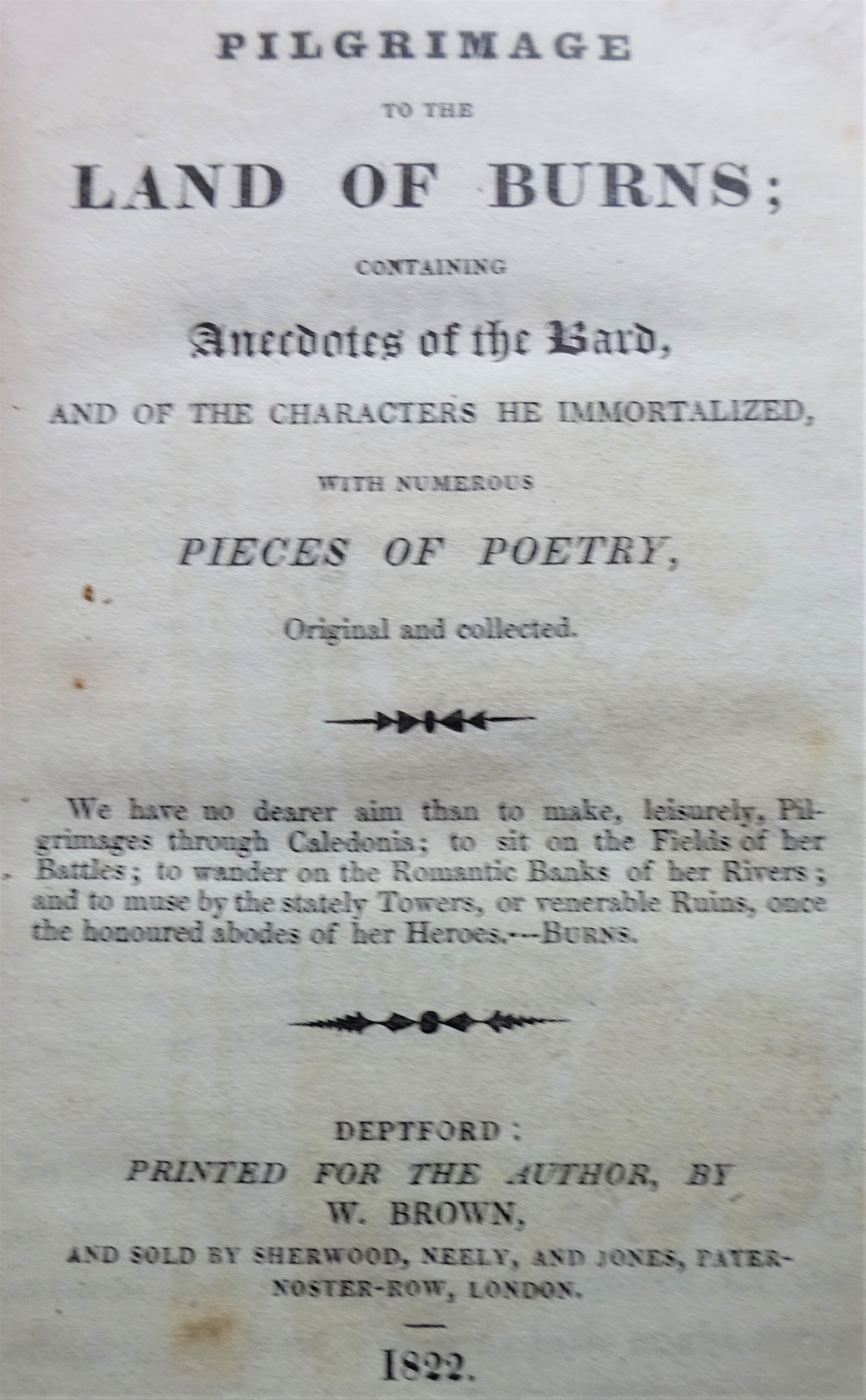
Title page from 'A Pilgrimage to the Land of Burns'.

He was born in the parish of Dailly, in Ayrshire to George Ainslie and a mother whose name is unknown. After a fair education, he became a clerk in Glasgow, a landscape gardener in his native district, and a clerk in the Register House, Edinburgh. For a short time he was amanuensis to Dugald Stewart. In 1822, being then ten years married to his cousin, Ainslie emigrated to America, where he continued to live with varied fortune for the rest of his days, paying a short visit to Scotland in 1864. Upon travelling to the New World, he was attracted to Robert Owen's social system in New Harmony, Indiana, but after a short trial he connected himself with a firm of brewers; his name is associated with the establishment of various breweries, mills, and factories in the Western States. He died in Louisville, 11 March 1878. Ainslie's best known book originated, by its title, what is now an accepted descriptive name for the part of Scotland associated with Burns. It is A Pilgrimage to the Land of Burns (1820), and consists of a narrative interspersed with sprightly lyrics. A collection of the poet's Scottish songs and ballads (of which the most popular is 'The Rover of Loch Ryan') appeared in New York in 1855. Ainslie is one of the group of minor Scottish singers represented in Whistle Binkie (Glasgow, 1853).
