= Ayr Town Hall =

Municipal Building in Ayr, Scotland

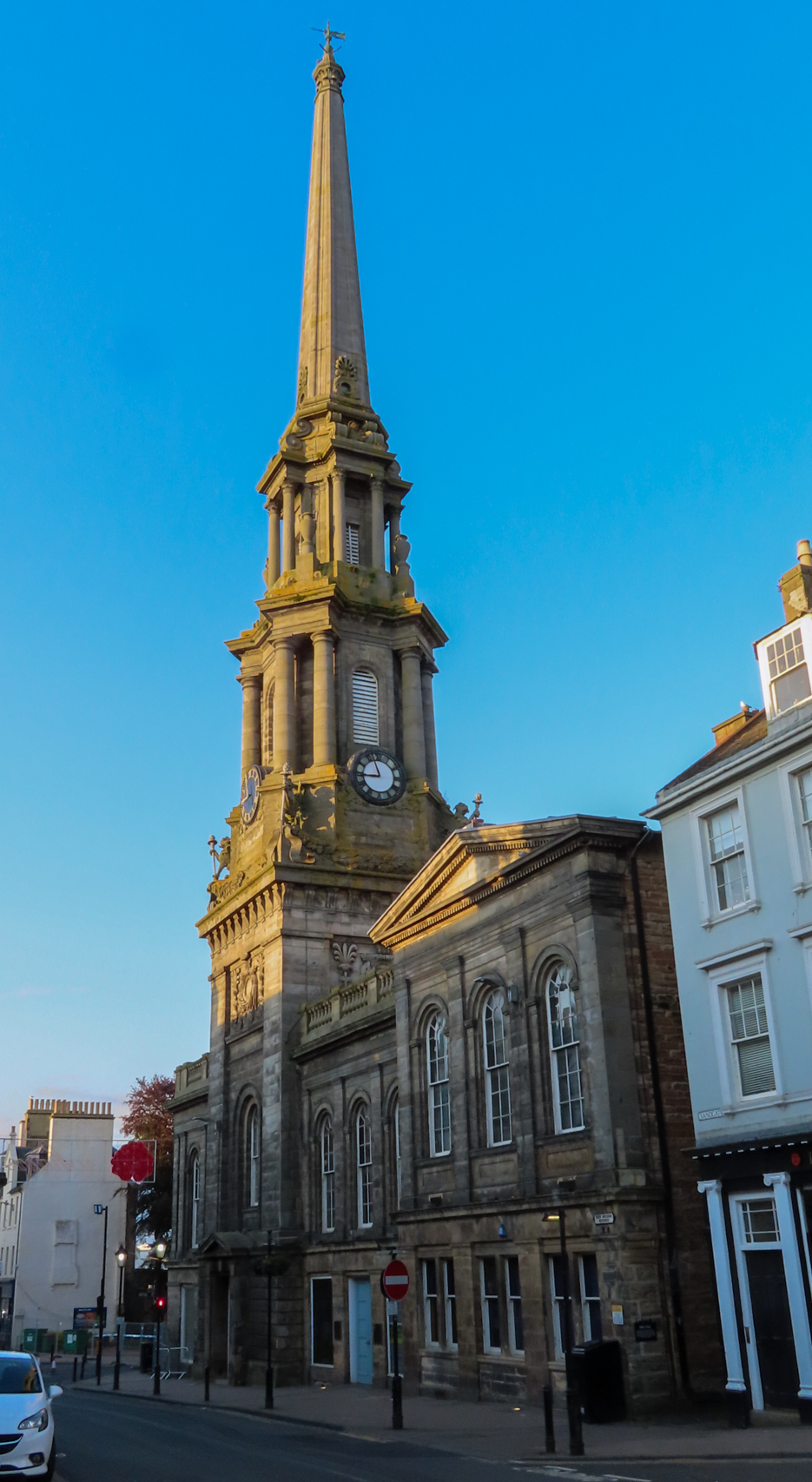
- Ayr Town Hall

- Shown in South Ayrshire
- 55.4642°N 4.6319°W
- Location: New Bridge Street, Ayr

History
- Built: 1830

Site notes
- Architect: Thomas Hamilton
- Architectural style: Neoclassical style

Listed Building – Category A
- Official name: 21 and 29 New Bridge Street and 1-9 (odd nos) High Street, Town Buildings
- Designated: 10 January 1980
- Reference no.: LB21692

Ayr Town Hall is a municipal building in New Bridge Street, Ayr, Scotland. The town hall, which was the headquarters of Ayr Burgh Council, is a Category A listed building.

== History ==
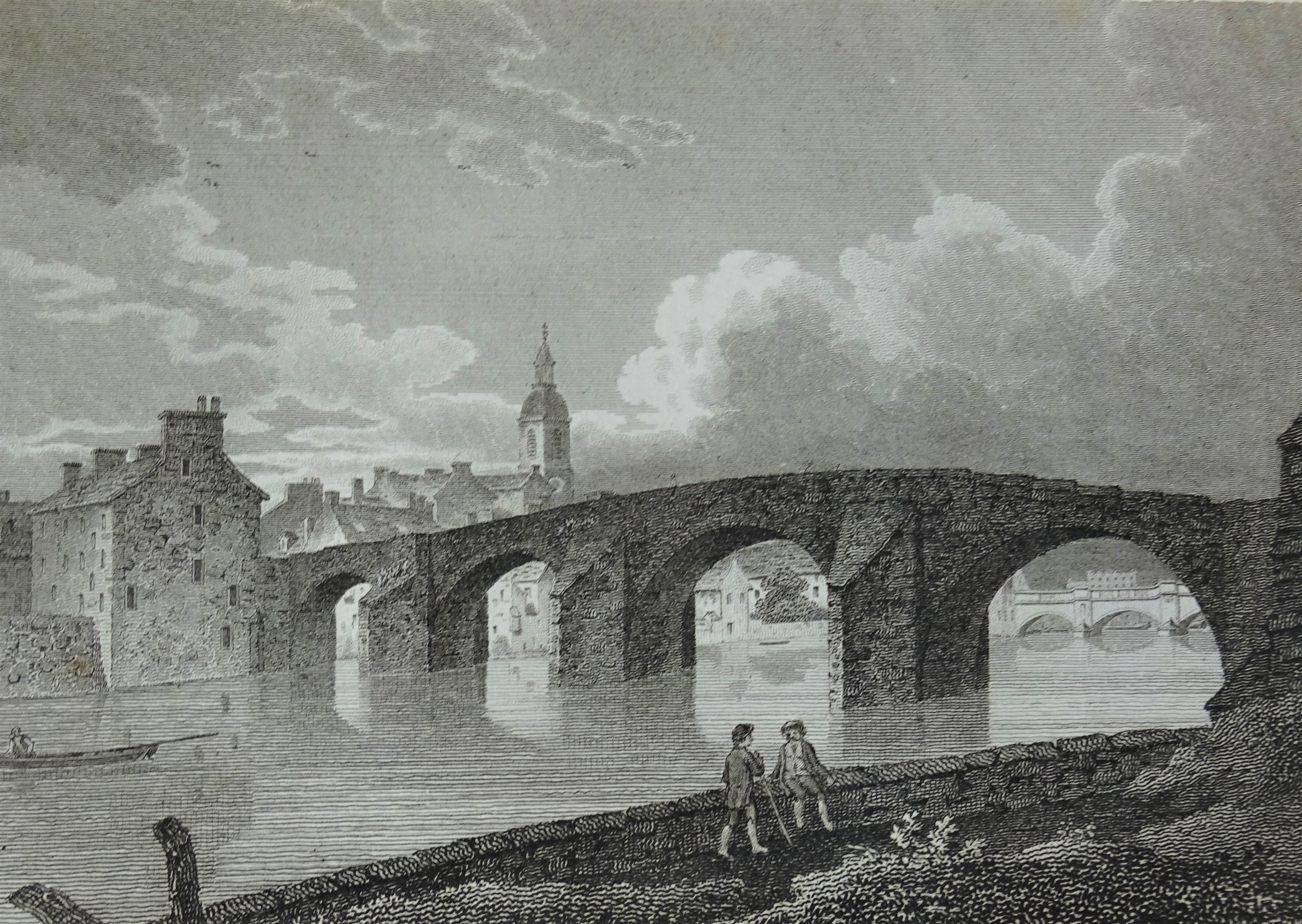
The old bridge across the River Ayr with the tolbooth steeple in the background, 1805

The first municipal building in Ayr, an old tolbooth which was erected in the middle of the road at the junction of Sandgate and New Bridge Street, was of medieval origin. The building, which incorporated a council chamber, a courtroom and a prison, was rebuilt in 1575 and augmented by a belfry in 1615 and by a steeple in 1726. It was approached on the north side by use of a flight of nineteen steps. After becoming dilapidated, the steeple was removed in 1823 and the building was demolished completely in 1825.

In the late 1820s, civic leaders decided to replace the tolbooth with a new town hall on a site occupied by the old assembly rooms, a short distance to the north east of the old tolbooth. The new building was designed by Thomas Hamilton in the neoclassical style, built by Archibald Johnston in ashlar stone at a cost of £9,965 and was completed in November 1830. The original design involved an asymmetrical main frontage with six bays facing onto New Bridge Street; the third bay from the left, which slightly projected forward, featured a porch with a triangular pediment on the ground floor, a round headed window on the first floor flanked by giant pilasters supporting a cornice with triglyphs and a steeple. The steeple was structured in multiple stages which included a clock, a belfry modelled on the Tower of the Winds in Athens and a spire with a weather vane. The building, measured to the top of the spire, was 225 feet (69 m) high. At that time the principal room was the main assembly hall.

The building was extended to the south by three extra bays with a new block, which projected forward as a pavilion and was built to a design by James Sellars of Campbell Douglas and Sellars, in 1881. Following the expansion, as well as the main assembly hall, the principal rooms included a council chamber, a committee room and a town clerk's office. Following a major fire, the interior was remodelled again to a design by J. Kennedy Hunter in 1901. Improvements included a concert organ, designed and manufactured by Lewis & Co, which was installed in the main assembly hall in 1904.

The building continued to serve as the headquarters of Ayr Burgh Council for much of the 20th century but ceased to be the local seat of government when the enlarged Kyle and Carrick District Council was formed at the County Buildings in Wellington Square in 1975. The concert organ was refurbished in 2008, enabling the venue to resume hosting the BBC Scottish Symphony Orchestra and other musical ensembles. A statue of the Indian political leader, Mahatma Gandhi, by the sculptor, Guatam Pal, was presented by the Government of India and unveiled inside the town hall on 14 September 2019.

Works of art in the town hall include a portrait by John Stevens of the former local member of parliament, Lord Patrick Crichton-Stuart.

== See also ==
- List of Category A listed buildings in South Ayrshire
