= Annie H. Small =

Ann Small
- Annie Hunter Small
- Born: 26 December 1857; Polmont
- Died: 7 February 1945 (aged 87); Edinburgh
- Other names: Annie
- Education: School for the Daughters of Missionaries in Walthamstow
- Occupations: Missionary and educator
- Parent(s): Reverend John Small and Nathina Hunter

Ann Small or Ann Hunter "Annie" Small (26 December 1857 – 7 February 1945) was a Scottish missionary to India and a Scottish educationist who trained women to work in Christian missions.

== Life ==
Small was born in Polmont on Boxing day in 1857. From the age of six to thirteen she was educated by her mother. She then attended the School for the Daughters of Missionaries in Walthamstow. She was one of three daughters and they all became missionaries like their father. In 1876 the Free Church of Scotland's Ladies' Society for Female Education in India and South Africa sent her to India where she was to remain until 1892 when she returned to the UK due to her health. Small had written "Light and Shade in Zenana Missionary Life" in 1890 which described the qualities required by aspiring female missionaries. Small was familiar not only with being a missionary in India but she had also spent time becoming familiar with the local traditions and customs.

In October 1894 Small applied her knowledge as the first principal of the Women's Missionary Training Institute (later renamed St Colm's College). Drawing on the independence she had learnt in Walthamstow Small encouraged her charges to develop themselves and not just to follow some pre-defined formula for becoming a missionary. The institute prepared women to engage women in Christian missions, such as in Zenana missions. The institute attracted students of different denominations and from Switzerland, Germany and Scandinavia. The institute was renamed in 1908 as the Women's Missionary College as the Free Church became part of the United Free Church of Scotland.

In 1910 she was very involved with the World Missionary Conference in Edinburgh. In the same year Small had her mother living with her at the institute. Her mother assisted until she became too ill and Small took an extended leave to care for her. Her mother died and Small retired in 1913.

Small died in a nursing home in Edinburgh in 1945.

== See also ==
- St Colm's College
- Zenana missions
