= Baltersan Castle =

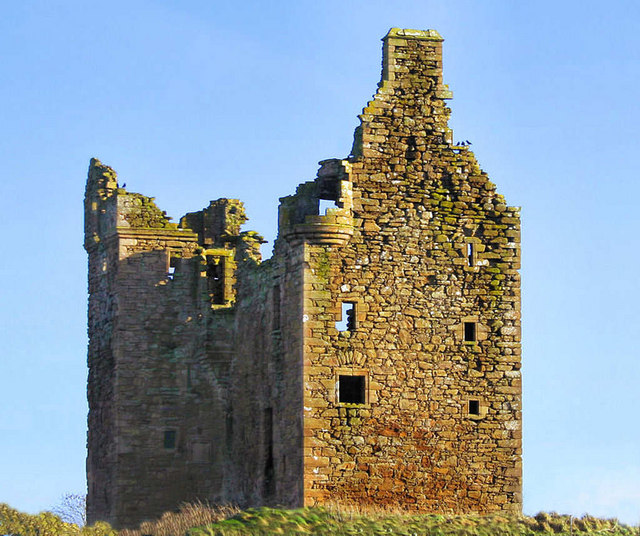
- Baltersan Castle
- Interactive map of the Baltersan Castle area

General information
- Status: Ruin
- Type: L-plan tower house
- Architectural style: Scottish tower house
- Location: near Maybole, South Ayrshire, Scotland
- Coordinates: 55.342731°N 4.709822°W
- Construction started: 1584
- Owner: Lichtsome Hoose Ltd

Technical details
- Floor count: Three (plus attic and garret)

Baltersan Castle is a ruined L-plan tower house near Maybole in South Ayrshire, Scotland. It stands close to Crossraguel Abbey, on the site of an earlier house associated with the Kennedy family of Carrick. The present tower was begun in 1584 for John Kennedy of Pennyglen and his wife Margaret Cathcart. It was abandoned about the middle of the 18th century and has since stood as a ruin.

Baltersan was first listed as a Category B building in 1971 and was upgraded to Category A in 1995. It is recorded on the Buildings at Risk Register for Scotland.

== Setting ==
Baltersan Castle lies in the former parish of Kirkoswald, about a mile south-west of Maybole and a short distance north-east of the ruins of Crossraguel Abbey, within the agricultural landscape of Carrick. The lands of Baltersan were historically connected with the abbey and passed into Kennedy hands in the later 16th century. The tower is prominently marked, with its enclosing parkland, on the map of Carrick in Joan Blaeu's Atlas Novus (1654), which derived from the survey of the cartographer Timothy Pont.

A stately fyne house, with gardens, orchards, parks and woods about it.

— William Abercrummie, Description of Carrick, late 17th century

== History ==
=== Earlier house and Egidia Blair ===
Before the present tower, the site was occupied by an earlier house or manor-place. The best-known early figure associated with it is Egidia (Giles) Blair, Lady Row, who died at Baltersan in 1530. Her tomb survives in nearby Crossraguel Abbey, marked by a carved slab of about 1530, and her surviving will records gifts to the abbey, local clergy, relatives and neighbours. After her death the earlier house appears to have been taken down.

=== Construction of the present castle ===
The lands of Baltersan passed to the Kennedys in 1574, after Gilbert Kennedy, 4th Earl of Cassillis obtained them from Allan Stewart, commendator of Crossraguel Abbey. Secondary accounts credit David Kennedy of Pennyglen with the building, while the now-weathered inscription over the entrance named John Kennedy of Pennyglen and his wife Margaret Cathcart and recorded that the house was begun on 1 March 1584. The Kennedys were among the dominant families of Carrick, and Baltersan formed part of a wider Kennedy landscape that included Crossraguel, Culzean and Cassillis. John Kennedy, "apparent of Baltersan", was recorded as a royal servant in 1601.

=== 17th and 18th centuries ===
During the 17th century Baltersan passed through related Kennedy branches, including the Kennedys of Culzean, Craigoch and Ardmillan; Major Thomas Kennedy of Baltersan is on record in the 1680s. The line ended when John Kennedy of Baltersan died without children in London in 1721, after which the estate became the subject of litigation. The property then passed to Captain Hugh Arbuthnot, a Kennedy cousin, usually regarded as the last known inhabitant. By the middle of the 18th century the castle had been abandoned and fell into ruin.

=== Later estate history ===
After the inhabited period, Baltersan lay within the wider estate background of the Kennedy family, later Earls of Cassillis and Marquesses of Ailsa. By the later 19th century the property had passed into private hands: it was acquired by Peter Sturrock (1820–1904), a Kilmarnock civil engineer, colliery owner and Provost of Kilmarnock who sat briefly as Conservative Member of Parliament for Kilmarnock Burghs from 1885 to 1886. Styling himself "of Baltersan", Sturrock intended to restore the castle, but the work was never carried out; he died in 1904. The Baltersan lands remained associated with the Sturrock family into the mid-20th century before returning to the Cassillis and Culzean estate of the Kennedys by a deed recorded in 1948. The castle itself was thereafter held by trustees of Archibald David Kennedy, 7th Marquess of Ailsa until 1989.

=== Modern ownership and restoration proposals ===
In 1989 the castle was sold by the Marquess of Ailsa's trustees to Catriona Wilkinson, and in the early 1990s it passed to James Brown, who became the principal modern custodian and historian of the castle and published a study of it in 2000. The castle featured in an episode of Dragons' Den in 2005, when a restoration and timeshare financing proposal was presented. In 2008 South Ayrshire Council granted listed building consent for the consolidation and rebuilding of the tower as a timeshare residence.

In 2024 Baltersan Castle was acquired by Angelo Ovidi through Lichtsome Hoose Ltd, with stated plans to restore the building and develop it as a music, arts and cultural education project.

== Architecture ==
Baltersan is a late 16th-century tower house built on a modified L-plan. It rises to three principal storeys with an attic and garret, and has ashlar angle-turrets at the north-west and south-east corners. The walls are about 4 feet (1.2 m) thick and the ground floor is vaulted, containing the kitchen and cellars. The square stair-wing in the re-entrant angle is crowned by a corbelled watch-chamber with a projecting oriel window; the main turnpike stair rises to the first-floor hall, with a smaller corbelled stair serving the upper floors. There are gunloops at the angle-turrets. Although now roofless and ruinous, the surviving masonry shows that Baltersan was a notably fine fortified laird's house rather than a simple defensive residence.

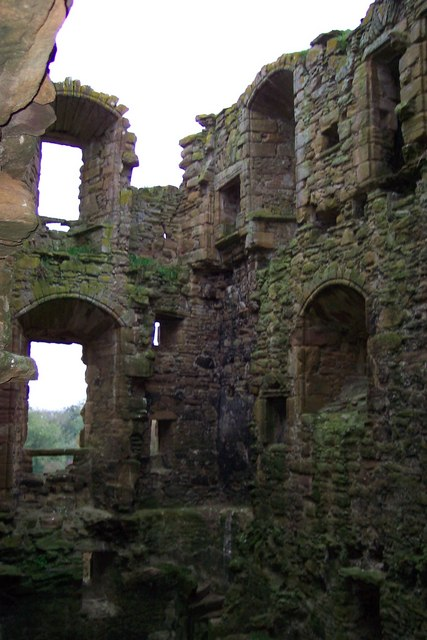
Interior of Baltersan Castle

== Lairds, owners and custodians ==
The following outlines the lairds, owners and custodians associated with Baltersan and its lands. It is not a complete legal succession, and some entries reflect the wider Kennedy estate background rather than direct occupation of the castle.

Lairds, owners and custodians of Baltersan
Period	Laird, owner or custodian
before 1530	James Kennedy of Baltersan and Egidia Blair, Lady Row, of the earlier Baltersan house. Egidia Blair died at Baltersan in 1530 and was buried at Crossraguel Abbey.
1574	David Kennedy of Pennyglen, after Gilbert Kennedy, 4th Earl of Cassillis obtained the Baltersan lands from Allan Stewart, commendator of Crossraguel.
1584	John Kennedy of Pennyglen and Margaret Cathcart, named on the entrance inscription as builders of the present tower, begun 1 March 1584.
c. 1601	John Kennedy, apparent of Baltersan, the heir, recorded as a royal servant.
mid-17th century	Kennedys of Culzean and Craigoch: the property passed to the Culzean branch, including Sir Alexander Kennedy of Craigoch.
1652–1680s	Major Thomas Kennedy of Baltersan, third son of Craigoch, on record at Baltersan into the 1680s.
late 17th century	Hugh Kennedy of Ardmillan and Baltersan, who succeeded through marriage to a daughter of Major Thomas Kennedy.
died 1721	John Kennedy of Baltersan, son of Hugh of Ardmillan; died without issue in London in 1721, leaving the estate in litigation.
1721	Captain Hugh Arbuthnot, a Kennedy cousin who inherited the estate; usually regarded as the last known inhabitant.
mid-18th century	The castle was abandoned and became roofless.
1846–1870	Archibald Kennedy, 2nd Marquess of Ailsa: Baltersan lay within the wider Cassillis, Culzean and Ailsa estate background.
later 19th century	Archibald Kennedy, 3rd Marquess of Ailsa: the property remained within the wider Ailsa estate background before passing into private ownership.
to 1904	Peter Sturrock of Baltersan (1820–1904): Kilmarnock civil engineer, colliery owner and Provost, and MP for Kilmarnock Burghs (1885–1886), who acquired Baltersan and intended to restore it; the work was never carried out.
c. 1948–1989	Archibald David Kennedy, 7th Marquess of Ailsa and the Cassillis and Culzean estate: the Baltersan lands returned to the Kennedy family in the 20th century, the castle being held by the Marquess's trustees until 1989.
1989–1992	Catriona Wilkinson, who acquired the castle from the Marquess of Ailsa's trustees by a feu disposition recorded in 1989.
1992–2024	James Albert Brown / Lichtsome Hoose Ltd: modern custodian and historian of the castle, author of a 2000 study and presenter of restoration plans on Dragons' Den (2005).
2024–present	Angelo Ovidi / Lichtsome Hoose Ltd: current owner, restoring the castle as a music, arts and cultural education project.

== Conservation status ==
Baltersan Castle is a Category A listed building, the highest of the three Scottish listing categories, indicating a building of national or international architectural or historic importance. It is also recorded on the Buildings at Risk Register for Scotland, which notes its ruinous condition and the history of restoration proposals.
