= Hamilton Paul =

Scottish poet and writer (1773–1854)

Hamilton Paul (10 April 1773 – 28 February 1854) was a Scottish church minister, and a writer, poet and humourist. In 1819, he edited the works of Robert Burns.

== Life ==
Paul was born on 10 April 1773 in the parish of Dailly, Ayrshire. He attended the parish school, and afterwards went to the University of Glasgow, where he had as class-companion Thomas Campbell the poet, with whom he successfully competed for a prize poem. The two poets corresponded long after they had left Glasgow.

Leaving the university, Paul became tutor in an Argyllshire family; but his literary bent induced him to become a partner in a printing establishment at Ayr, and for three years he edited the Ayr Advertiser.

Licensed to preach by the presbytery in July 1800, he became assistant at Coylton that year, and occupied several similar positions until 1813, when he was presented with the united livings of Broughton, Kilbucho, and Glenholm in Peeblesshire.

== Death ==
He died, unmarried, on 28 February 1854, in Broughton.

== Works ==
When at the university, Paul had a reputation for improvising witty verses, some of which had a wide college popularity. His first volume of verse, published in 1800, was entitled Paul's First and Second Epistles to the Dearly Beloved the Female Disciples or Female Students of Natural Philosophy in Anderson's Institution, Glasgow. In 1805, he published a rhymed pamphlet in favour of vaccination ("Vaccination, or Beauty Preserved").

In 1819, he edited the works of Burns, contributing a memoir and ode in memory of the poet. The first of the Burns Clubs started at the beginning of the century found in him an enthusiastic supporter; and he wrote a poetical appeal for the preservation of the Auld Brig O' Doon (bridge), famous in Burns's poem Tam o' Shanter.

His many effusions were scattered among the newspapers and magazines of his day, and were not collected. He wrote the account of his parish in the New Statistical Account of Scotland (vol. iii.) Among his friends, his reputation as a humourist and story-teller was greater than as a poet. Even in the pulpit he could not be grave, and it is said that his sermons, though learned and able, were preached from texts humorously selected, and were interspersed with jests.

== See also ==
- List of Scottish poets
- List of University of Glasgow people
