= Dunure Castle =

Castle in South Ayrshire, Scotland

Coordinates: 55.4048°N 4.7655°W

- Dunure, Scotland; NS250158
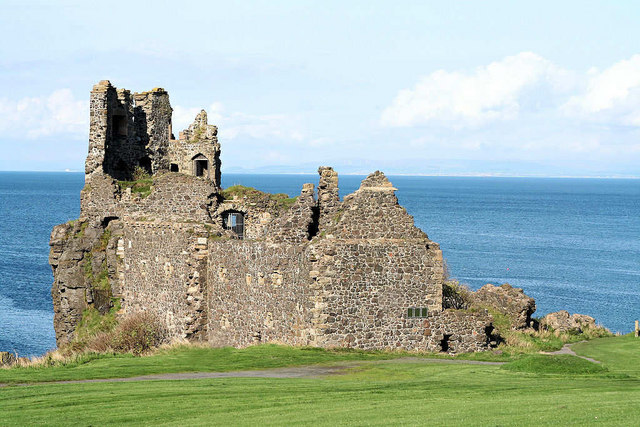
- Dunure Castle from the east

Site information
- Owner: Private
- Open to the public: Yes
- Condition: Ruined

Site history
- Built: 13th century
- Built by: Clan Kennedy
- In use: 13th to 17th century
- Materials: Stone

Dunure Castle is located on the west coast of Scotland, in South Ayrshire, about five miles (eight kilometres) south of Ayr and close to the village of Dunure. Today the castle stands in ruins on a rocky promontory on the Carrick coast, overlooking the small harbour of Dunure.

== Introduction ==
The site dates from the late 13th century; the earliest charter for the lands dating from 1256, but the remains of the building are of 15th- and 16th-century origin. One tradition says that the castle was built by the Danes. Another claims that the Mackinnons held the castle from Alexander III as a reward for their valour at the Battle of Largs.

The castle is the point of origin of the Kennedys of Carrick (not to be confused with the American Kennedy family), who once ruled over much of south western Scotland and were granted the lands in 1357. Sir James Balfour described Dunure as "a grate and pleasand stronge housse, the most ancient habitation of the surname of Kennedy, Lairds of Dunure, now Earles of Cassiles."

In August 1563, Mary, Queen of Scots, visited the castle for three days during her progress round the west of the country, before moving on to Ardmillan Castle.

The Celtic name Dunure or Dunoure is said to derive from the "hill" or "fort of the yew tree".

== Roasting of the Commendator of Crossraguel ==
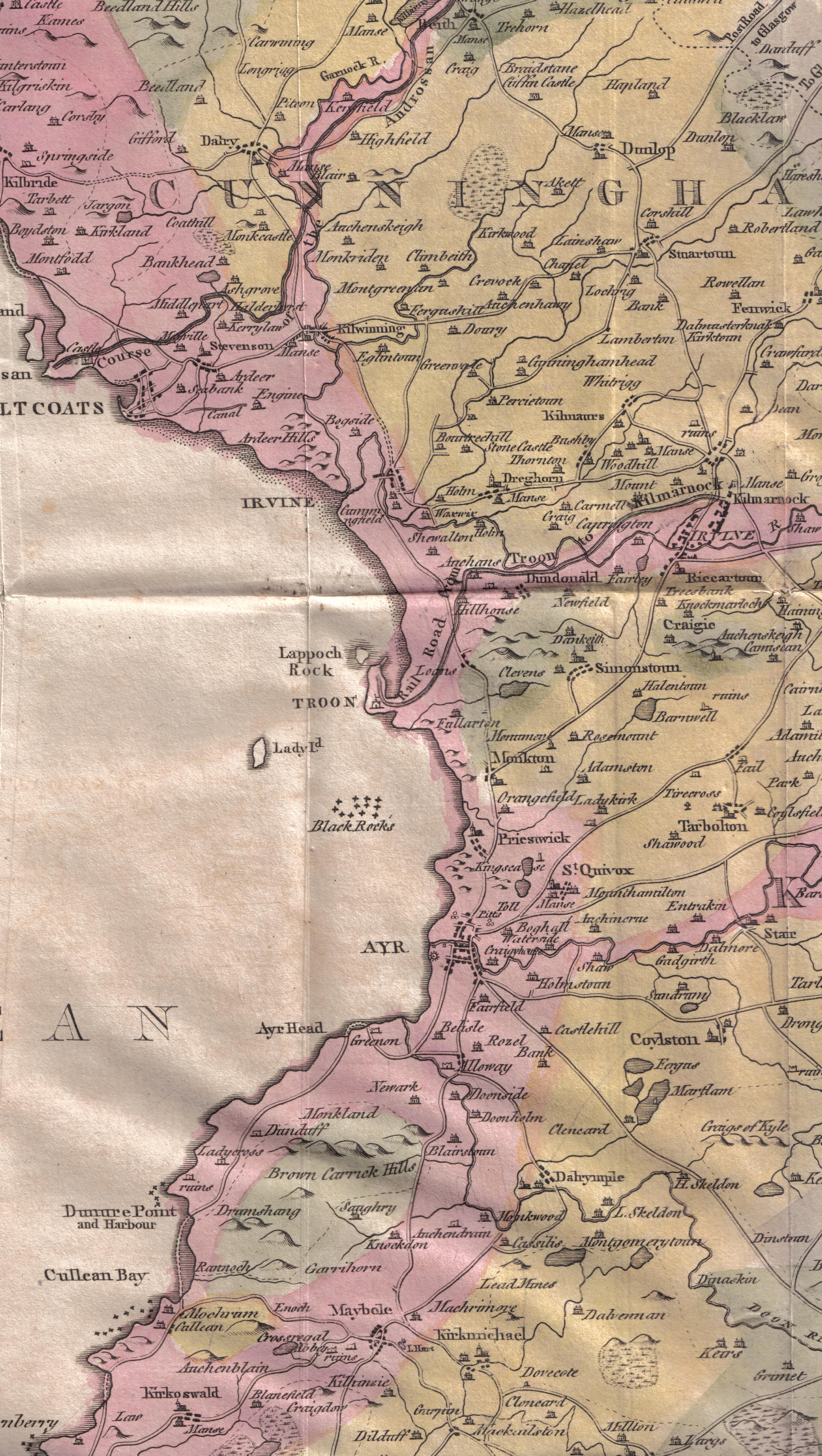
William Aiton's 1811 map showing Dunure.

In 1570, a dispute arose between Gilbert Kennedy, 4th Earl of Cassillis, and Allan Stewart, the succeeding lay Commendator of Crossraguel Abbey, over the ownership of some of the abbey lands and their rental income. The Earl's uncle was Quintin Kennedy, the last true abbot of Crossraguel. Quintin challenged John Knox to a debate on the Catholic Mass. Gilbert had expected to secure the Commendatorship, however Allan obtained it through the influence of his relative, Captain James Stewart of Cardonald. Gilbert, with sixteen men, caught Allan Stewart unexpectedly in Crossraguel Woods whilst a guest of the Laird of Bargany, and tricked him into journeying to Dunure. At the castle, he was deprived of his horse and weapons and guarded by six of the Earl's men.

For two days, Gilbert left the commendator to consider his fate and because he was obstinate and refused to sign over the lands and rentals, Gilbert tortured him twice, roasting and basting his feet and body over a brazier in the Black Vault of the castle, aided by his cook, baker and pantrymen. As a result of the torture sessions of the first and seventh days of September 1570, the lands were signed over to Gilbert.

The Commendator was rescued from his confinement by the Laird of Bargany, Allan's brother in law, who arrived with a body of men; first hiding in the chapel and then storming the castle. The rights to the abbey lands were settled, partly by the Earl providing Allen Stewart with sufficient funds to allow him to live 'comfortably' for the rest of his life. In the meantime, he had been taken to the Cross of Ayr where he had denounced the Earl of Cassillis. The Earl was never fully brought to book for his actions by the Privy Council. Allen Stewart never walked again.

The castle and estate of Dunure, together with Dalquharran, were purchased by Sir Thomas Kennedy of Kirkhill in the late 17th century.

== Usage and demise ==
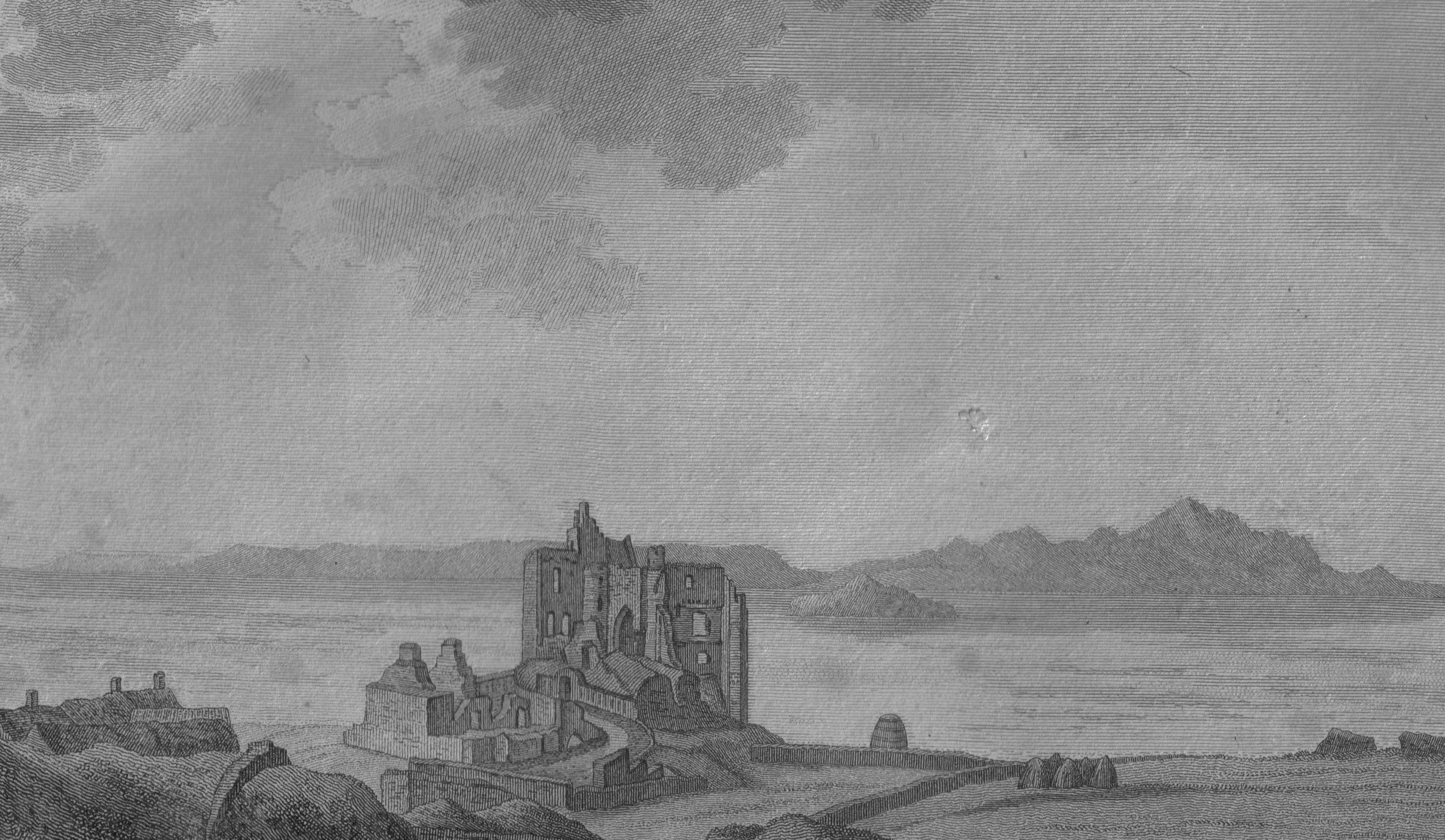
The castle in 1789

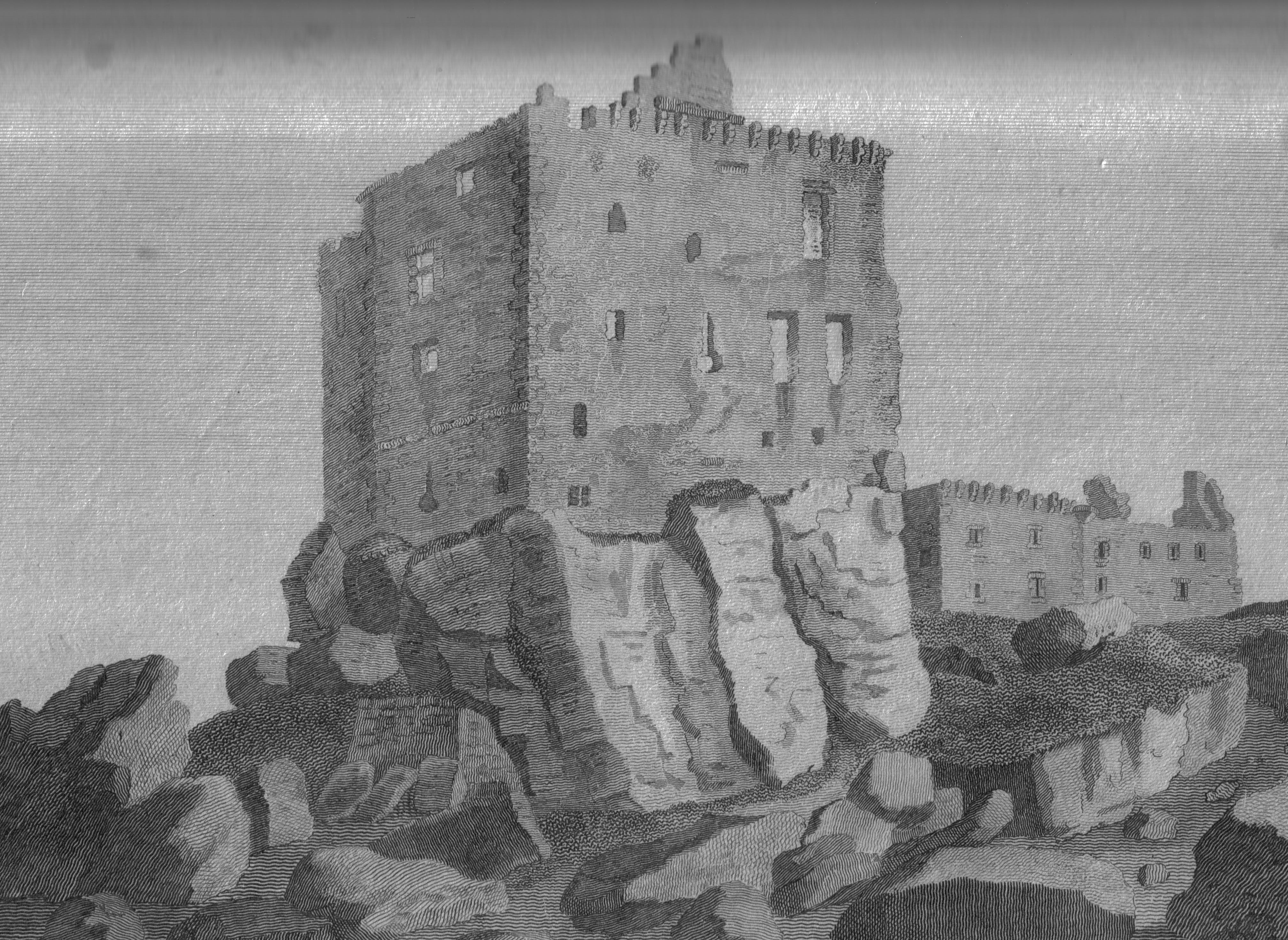
The castle keep in 1789

The castle consisted of two distinct parts; a keep of an irregular shape on the top of a precipitous rock and other buildings at a lower level. The keep walls are about five feet thick and the vaults on the basement are well preserved, however most of the superstructure is entirely demolished. The keep represents the original castle, much altered. The central portion of the castle may be 15th century and was intended to form a defence to the access into the keep. The additional buildings are of a later date and contain two kitchens on the ground level, one for the castle and the other for the retainers. To the north-east stands a detached wall which may have led to a gateway. A drawbridge may have stood nearby and the chapel may have been located against the thick wall of the central part of the castle. A moat or fosse protected the approach and a wall may have also existed.

In the 1990s, excavations showed that a hall house was built across the 13th century court in the 14th century.

Beneath the castle is a cavern called the Browney's Cave which may have been a sally-port: a secret tunnel leading to the castle.

In 1429 a meeting took place at Dunure between James Campbell, representing King James I of Scotland and John Mor MacDonald, representing the Lord of the Isles. Violence broke out and MacDonald was killed. James I's efforts to contain the outrage of the Lords of the Isles by executing Campbell did not prevent a subsequent uprising by them. For three days from 4 August 1563, Mary, Queen of Scots, stayed at Dunure Castle on her Royal tour down the west coast to Glenluce Abbey then on to Whithorn Priory. She was the guest of Gilbert Kennedy, the 4th Earl of Cassillis.

=== Doocot ===
The late medieval "beehive"-shaped dovecot of Dunure Castle dates probably from the 15th century. It would have held some 200 nesting boxes and would have supplied the castle with fresh eggs and meat.

=== Demise ===
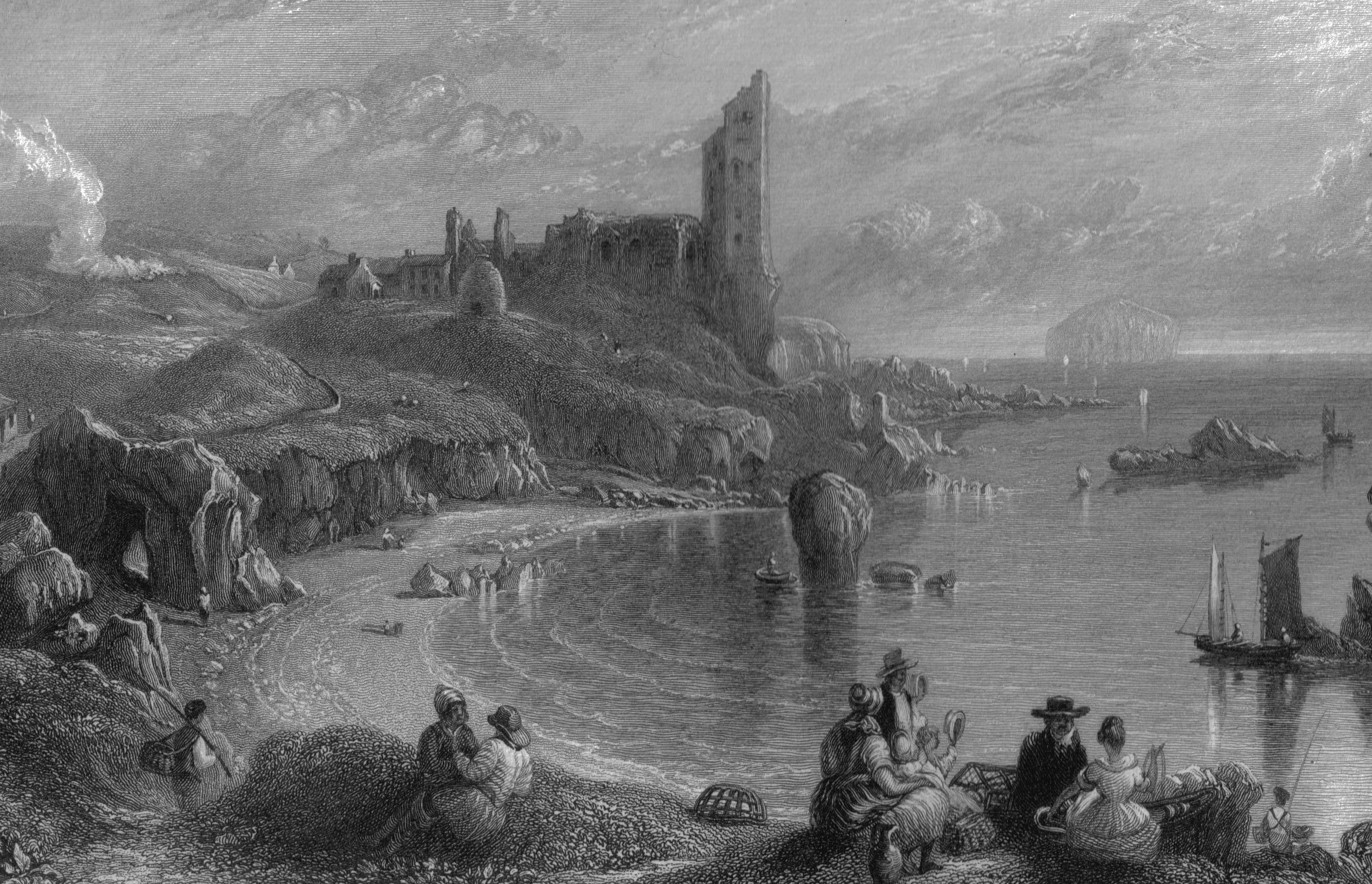
Dunure and the castle in 1840

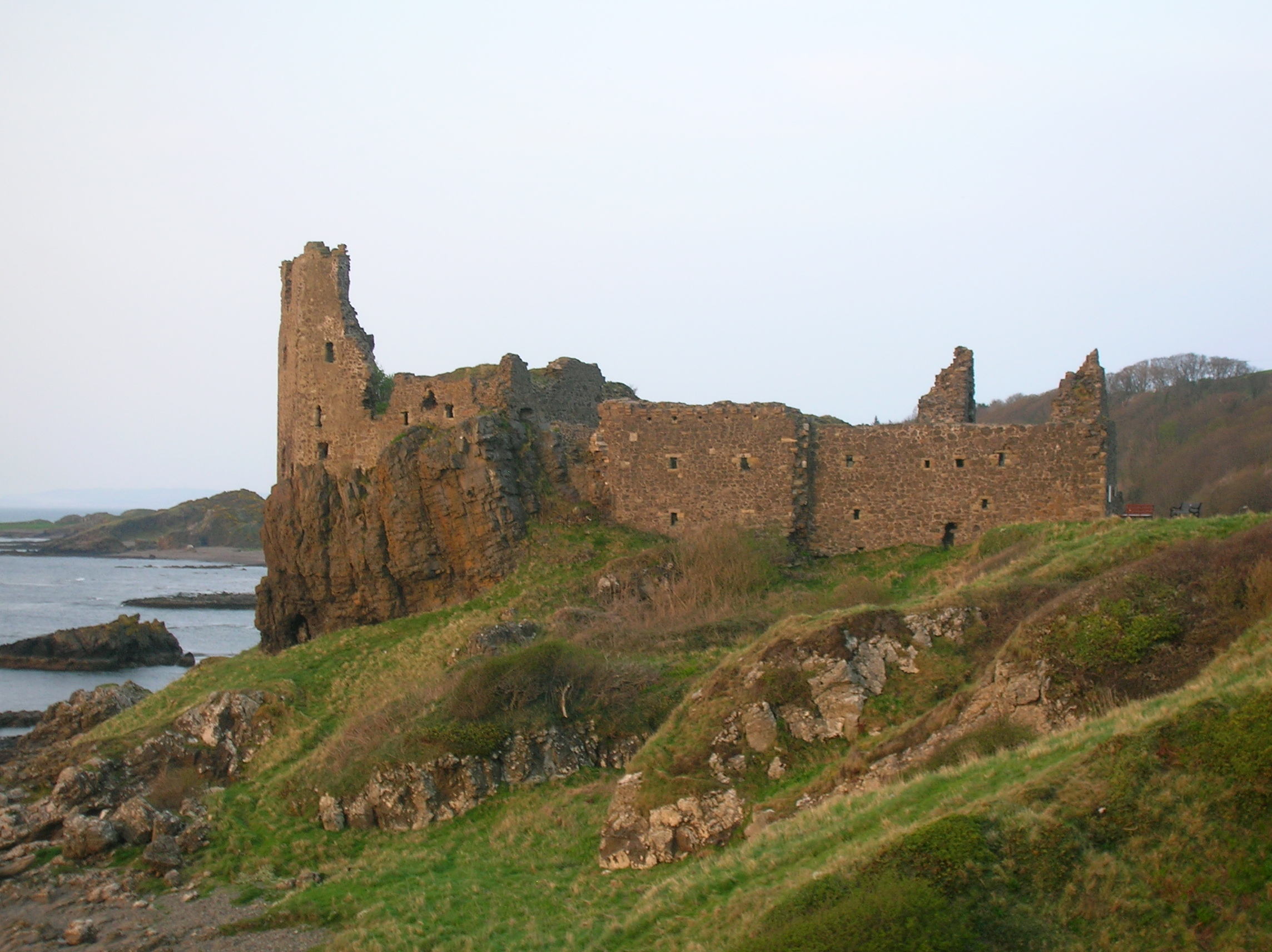
Dunure Castle and headland from the south.

The castle's demise began in the mid-17th century. By 1694, the castle was described as "wholly ruined". It is not clear whether this can be linked to the Civil War period, although local tradition suggests that Dunure had been burnt and/or blown up. A major collapse of the south-eastern part of the keep could perhaps be linked to such activity. Recovery of building materials for the construction of the Cromwellian citadel in Ayr may also account for its ruination, as occurred at Ardrossan Castle. Much evidence exists for the systematic dismantling of the structure for recoverable building materials including the orderly removal of slates, stone, and glass. The windows were dismantled and comprehensively stripped of their lead. Remains of a localised fire and associated deposits of coal suggested that smelting of the lead took place within the room. Those dismantling the castle seem to have occupied part of the structure during their work.

The ruin subsequently saw periodic robbing of its sandstone dressings. A range of castle buildings to the south of Area 4 remained in occupation until c. 1860. Census records and reuse of some rooms demonstrate that some of the occupants were fishermen. A large midden of mussel shell gave evidence for the baiting of cod lines. Domestic refuse of the later 18th and early to mid-19th century was also recovered. The only relatively late recorded military action at Dunure consists of a short siege in 1570. A Civil War action or slighting is a further possibility, although the castle may have been abandoned by that time. The route of a stone-lined water course was located at the south end of the trench as it ran into the entrance of the Area 4 kitchen range. Groundworks to the south of the ruins located a further, well preserved section of the same water course.

=== Present day ===
The castle has been excavated and consolidated, making safe the public access to the area. The castle dominates the Kennedy Park, which has a number of facilities for visitors. There are also said to be secret Ley tunnels which connect Dunure Castle to Greenan Castle further north.

== Micro-history ==
In the story "The Brownie of Dunure," Sir Thomas Kennedy of Dunure adopts the son of his neighbour and kinsman, Reginald Duff, Laird of Dunduff. Sir Thomas has an illegitimate daughter and he hopes that the two will marry. The O'Neils of Ireland are competitors for her hand and to ensure a love match, the legend of the Brownie of Dunure is employed with mixed results.

== See also ==
- Dunduff Castle
