= Peter Hewat (minister) =

Peter Hewat (c.1570–1645) was a Scottish minister who twice served as a minister of St Giles Cathedral.

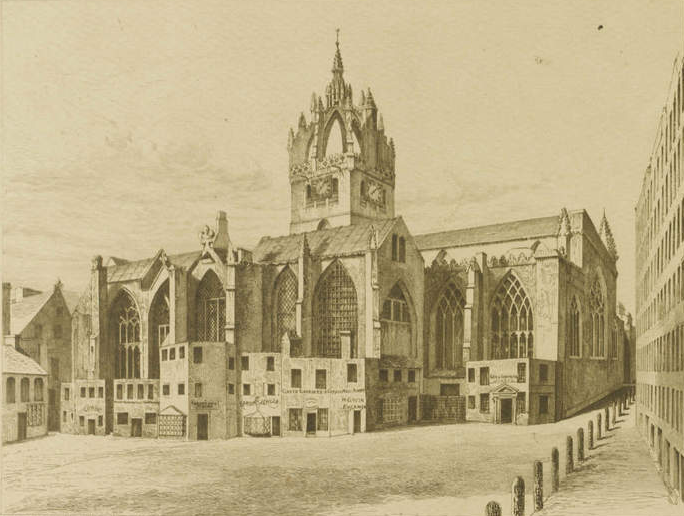
St Giles High Church

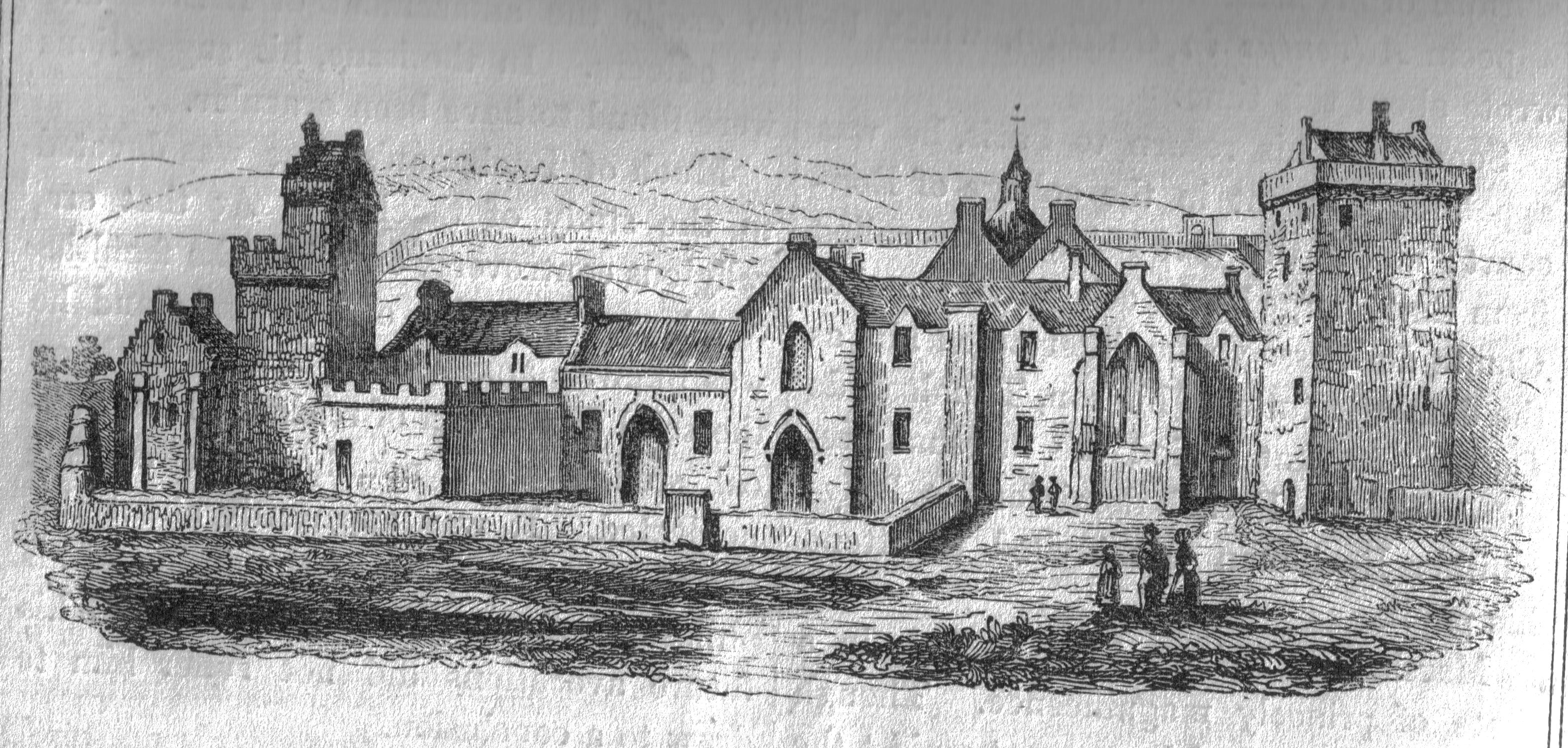
Crossraguel prior to its destruction

== Life ==
He graduated with an MA from the University of Edinburgh in 1588. He is first mentioned in 1594 when he was translated from "second charge" at St Giles Cathedral to Hailes (Colinton Parish Church) in 1594. He translated to Old Greyfriars parish in Edinburgh in 1597 and was raised to "first charge" there in 1599. At this time Greyfriars was housed in the south-west section of St Giles Cathedral. King James moved him to the main body of St Giles in February 1610.

Hewat's relationship with the King is noteworthy, being amongst the minority of the Scottish clergy to side with the King following the Gowrie Conspiracy of 1600. Although this favoured him with the King it distanced him from the majority of the Scottish church.

He sat on the General Assembly in 1610 and being in strong favour with King James VI was gifted Crossraguel Abbey near Maybole in Ayrshire in 1612. In 1617 he was (counter to all other logic) entitled Abbot of Crossraguel. This was possibly to simplify land ownership issues, and was certainly related to land ownership rather than a monastic function. This ownership entitled him to a seat in the Scottish Parliament in Edinburgh. As this was adjacent to St Giles it is highly likely that he did attend but he does not appear to have been a major figure. There is some indication that Hewat served as a minister in the former church element within Crossraguel.

His preaching is remembered for its focus on "brotherly kindness" and the importance of charity in Christian life.

He sat on the Court of the High Commission in 1615. In 1616 he was one of the group of ministers in charge of revising the liturgy for the Church of Scotland and in 1617 he consulted the ministers in relation to the Protest for the Liberties of the Kirk but was removed from the Commission later that year. Although still a minister he was temporarily deprived of his post and confined in Dundee. He continued to be paid a stipend until Candlemass 1619. From June 1620 he was ordered to be confined at his home at Crossraguel Abbey. His position at St Giles was eventually filled by John Maxwell in 1622.

He died at Crossraguel in August 1645.

== Family ==
Around 1599 he married Isobel Smail (d.1644) daughter of William Smail, an Edinburgh merchant. Their children included:

- Margaret Hewat (b.1600) died in infancy
- John Hewat (b.1602)
- Lilias Hewat (b.1603)
- Margaret Hewat (b.1605)
- Jean Hewat (b.1611)
- William Hewat (b.1619)
- Elspeth
- Janet
- Elizabeth or Elspeth, married Bryce Blair of Goldring

== Publications ==
- Three Excellent Points of Christian Doctrine (1621)
