= Stella Jane Reekie =

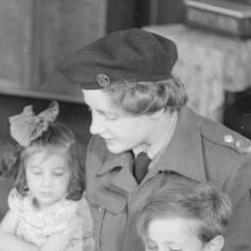
- in 1945
- Born: 29 July 1922; Gravesend
- Died: 28 September 1982 (aged 60); Glasgow
- Resting place: St Margaret's Church, Kent, England
- Occupation: Inter-faith missionary worker

Stella Jane Reekie, (29 July 1922 - 28 September 1982) was a missionary and inter-faith worker who worked with refugees during World War II and later, set up the Church of Scotland's International Flat in Glasgow for refugees and immigrants.

== Early life ==
Reekie was born in Gravesend on 29 July 1922. She was the daughter of Arthur Reekie and Jane Reekie and was the youngest of eight siblings. She attended the Bronte Villas School and then Gravesend Country School for Girls.

== Working life ==
=== Early career ===
While working in the nursery at Cadby Hall during World War II, Reekie visited the Greek Embassy and watched a film shown by the Red Cross detailing the wartime conditions and deprivation in Europe, and the need for relief workers. While continuing to work, Reekie trained with the Red Cross to work overseas with refugees.

=== Bergen Belsen ===
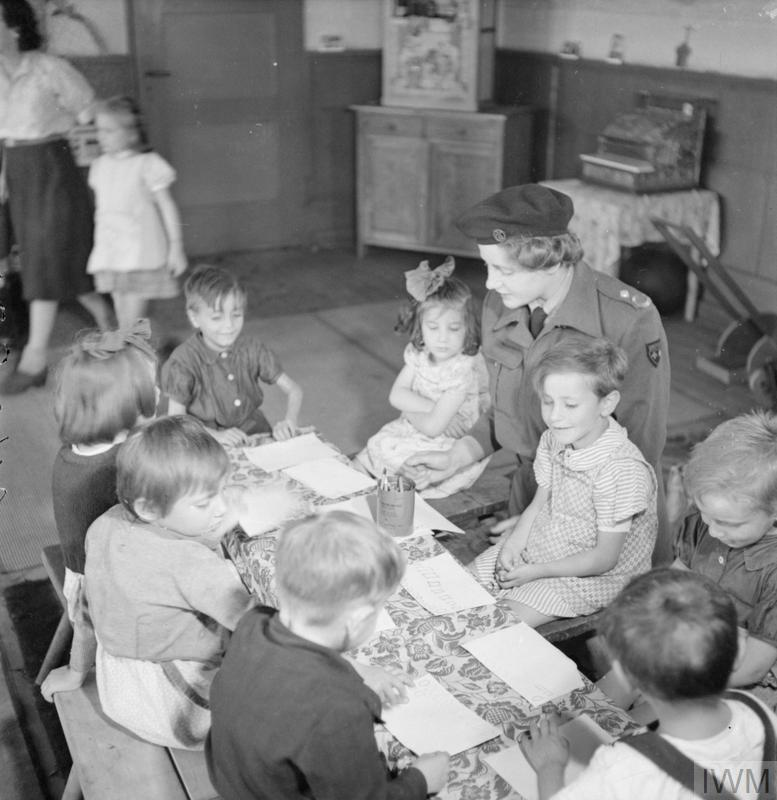
Stella Jane Reekie working with orphans after the liberation of Bergen Belsen in June 1945

As a British nurse and childcare specialist who trained with the Red Cross, in 1945 Reekie sailed with a group of other workers to Belgium. Bergen Belsen concentration camp was discovered on 15 April 1945. as a civilian, Reekie worked within the Polish School at Bergen Belsen catering for the physical needs of nearly 500 children between the ages of 7 and 16.

Following the closure of Bergen Belsen, Reekie oversaw the Children's Block of the British Red Cross Hospital for T.B. displaced persons at Bad Rehburg.

=== Pakistan ===
From 1949–1951, Stella studied to become a missionary at St Colm's College in Edinburgh. In 1951 a group of missionaries, including Reekie, sailed from Liverpool on the S.S. Cilicia for Karachi and Bombay. Reekie worked at the Welfare Centre in the Sialkot district of Karachi, where training was given to local midwives and clinics were organised for mothers and babies.

Reekie visited villages on foot helping women in many practical ways such as delivering relief food and clothing, and promoting and supervising women's sewing; defending their work against the traditional views of men and missionary wives.

=== The International Flat ===
In 1968 Reekie returned to Scotland and was appointed by the Home Board of the Church of Scotland to work three days a week in Glasgow with displaced people and those in need. Suitable accommodation was required as a safe place for the refugees. Originally Reekie used her own tenement flat and in 1972 the Church of Scotland bought a flat at 20 Glasgow Street which became known as the International Flat where refugees, immigrants and their families were welcomed.

On 28 September 1982 Reekie died after suffering from cancer.
