= Quintin Kennedy =

Scottish abbot (1520–1564)

Quintin Kennedy (1520–1564) was a Scottish abbot from a noble background, one of the last Catholic opponents of the Scottish Reformation.

== Life ==
He was son of Gilbert Kennedy, 2nd Earl of Cassillis, and his wife Isabel, daughter of Archibald Campbell, 2nd Earl of Argyll. He was born in 1520, and received his early education at St. Salvator's College, St. Andrews. He then went to the University of Paris, where he studied theology and civil and canon law.

Returning to Scotland, Kennedy became vicar of Girvan, and in 1547 succeeded a relative as abbot of Crossraguel Abbey, in the parish of Kirkoswald, a monastery founded by Duncan, 1st Earl of Carrick, from whom the Kennedys claimed descent. In the spring of 1559 the reformer John Willock, preached in Ayr against the Catholic mass, and Kennedy challenged him to a public discussion. Kennedy, however, was late to the disputation, or was deterred by Willock's following.

John Knox came to Ayrshire in 1562 to preach the reformed doctrines, and Kennedy challenged him also to a public discussion. They met by arrangement in the house of the provost of the collegiate church of Maybole, a short distance from Crossraguel Abbey, with forty witnesses on each side. The disputation lasted for three days, but was inconclusive.

Part of Crossraguel Abbey was destroyed in 1561 by order of the Scottish privy council. The Catholic liturgy continued in use there, despite disapproval and a dispute over tax. Kennedy, however, was in bad health and died in 22 July 1564.

== Works ==
Kennedy is considered to have innovated as a theologian, restating orthodox Catholic eucharistic doctrine for his times. In 1558 he published A Compendious treatise, conform to the Scriptures of Almighty God, to Reason and Authority, declaring the nearest and only Way to establish the Conscience of a Christian Man, in all Matters which are in Debate concerning Faith and Religion. In 1561 he wrote a treatise against the reformed ministers, printed in 1812 from manuscript, and a manuscript work on the mass.
