= Old Dailly =

Coordinates: 55.25°N 04.80°W

- Location within South Ayrshire
- OS grid reference: NX2299
- Council area: South Ayrshire
- Lieutenancy area: Ayrshire and Arran
- Country: Scotland
- Sovereign state: United Kingdom
- Post town: GIRVAN
- Postcode district: KA26
- Dialling code: 01465
- Police: Scotland
- Fire: Scottish
- Ambulance: Scottish
- UK Parliament: Ayr, Carrick and Cumnock
- Scottish Parliament: Carrick, Cumnock and Doon Valley

Old Dailly is a hamlet in South Ayrshire, Scotland. It is located west of Dailly (or "New Dailly").

The Charter or Blue stones of Old Dailly in Ayrshire are located in the cemetery of Old Dailly church.
