= Dailly =

Coordinates: 55.276656°N 4.724414°W

Dailly: Scottish Gaelic: Dail Mhaol Chiarain
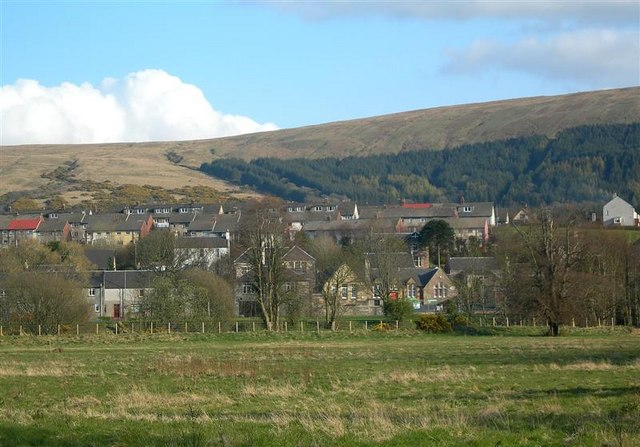
- Dailly view with Hadyard Hill in the background

- Location within South Ayrshire
- Population: 810 (2020)
- OS grid reference: NS270014
- Council area: South Ayrshire
- Lieutenancy area: Ayrshire and Arran
- Country: Scotland
- Sovereign state: United Kingdom
- Post town: GIRVAN
- Postcode district: KA26
- Dialling code: 01465
- Police: Scotland
- Fire: Scottish
- Ambulance: Scottish
- UK Parliament: Ayr, Carrick and Cumnock
- Scottish Parliament: Carrick, Cumnock and Doon Valley

Dailly (Scottish Gaelic: Dail Mhaol Chiarain) is a village in South Ayrshire, Scotland. It is located on the Water of Girvan, five miles (eight kilometres) south of Maybole, and three miles (five kilometres) east of Old Dailly. "New Dailly", as it was originally known, was laid out in the 1760s as a coal-mining village. In 1849 a fire broke out in Maxwell Colliery, one of the nearby mines, and continued to burn for 50 years. In Dailly there are two castles which the locals call the new castle and the old castle; they are both derelict.

== Notable people ==
- Thomas Thomson FRSE (1768–1852) antiquary and friend of Walter Scott
- Hamilton Paul (1773–1854), church minister, poet and writer
- Thomas's younger brother, John Thomson of Duddingston FRSE (1778 – 1840) minister at Dailly 1800-1805 and artist
- Hew Ainslie (1792–1878), poet
- Anne Hepburn, missionary was born here in 1925
- Tommy Lawrence, footballer
- Ross McCrorie, footballer who plays with Rangers
- Robby McCrorie footballer who plays with Rangers
- Allan Dorans Member of Parliament for Ayr, Carrick and Cumnock
