= Crossraguel Abbey =

Monastery ruins in South Ayrshire, Scotland

Coordinates: 55°20′19″N 4°43′15″W

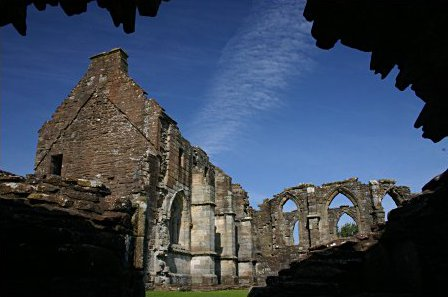
- Interactive map of Crossraguel Abbey

Monastery information
- Order: Cluniac
- Established: 1260s
- Disestablished: 1617
- Mother house: Paisley Abbey
- Diocese: Diocese of Glasgow
- Controlled churches: Dailly; Girvan; Inchmarnock; Kirkudbright-Innertig; Kirkoswald; Straiton

People
- Founder: Donnchadh, Earl of Carrick

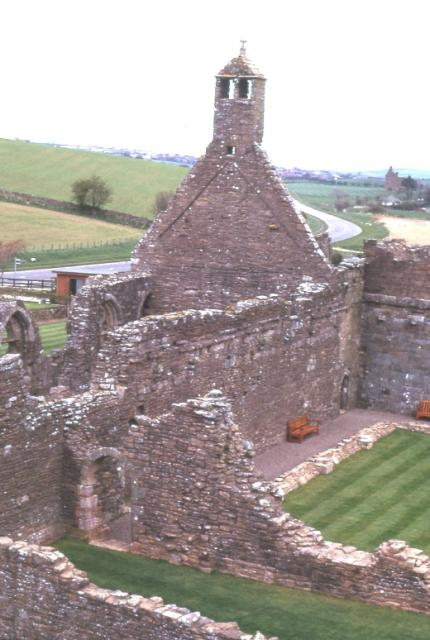
Crossraguel Abbey church from the gate tower

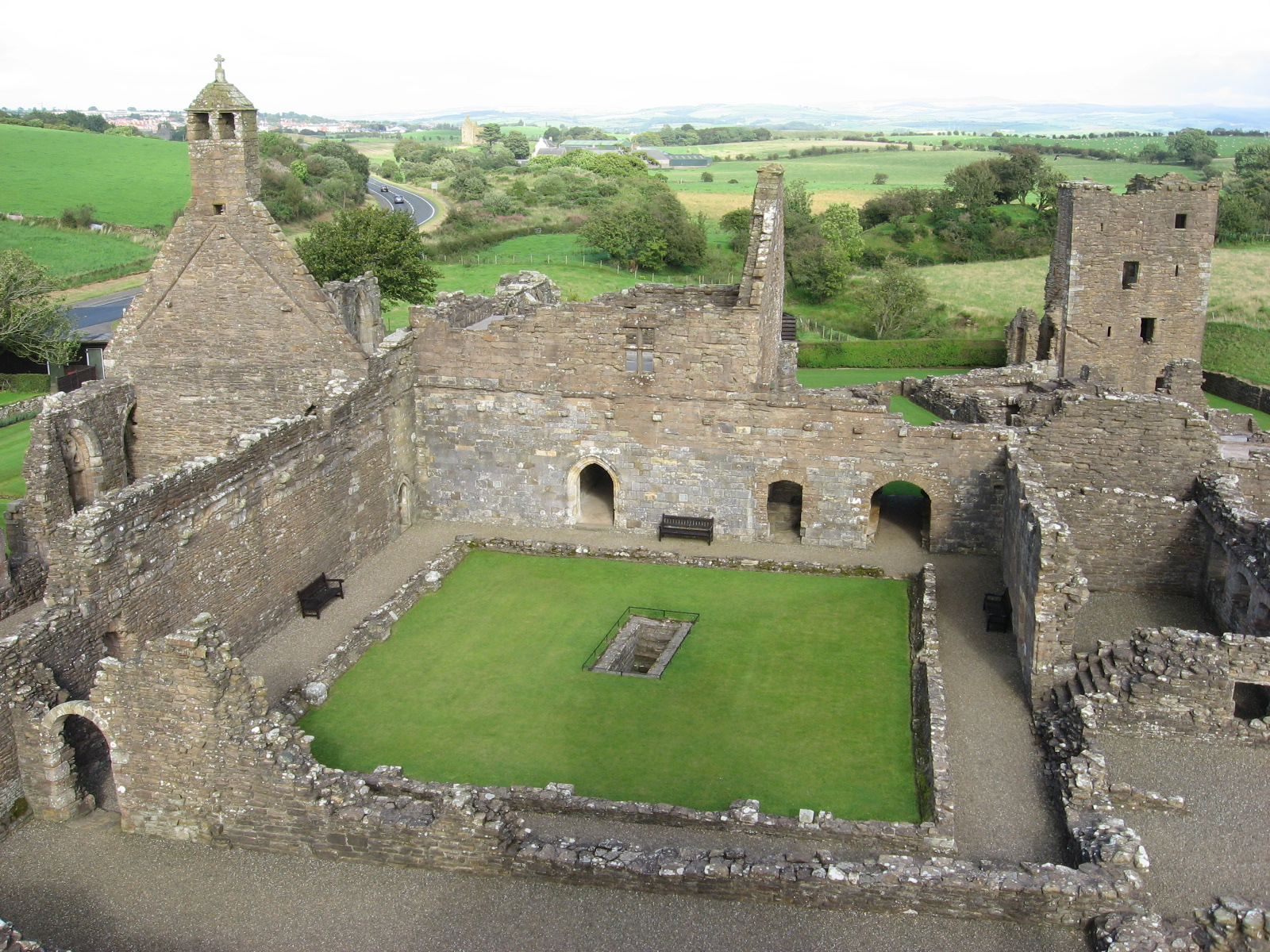
Crossraguel Abbey cloister looking east from the gate tower

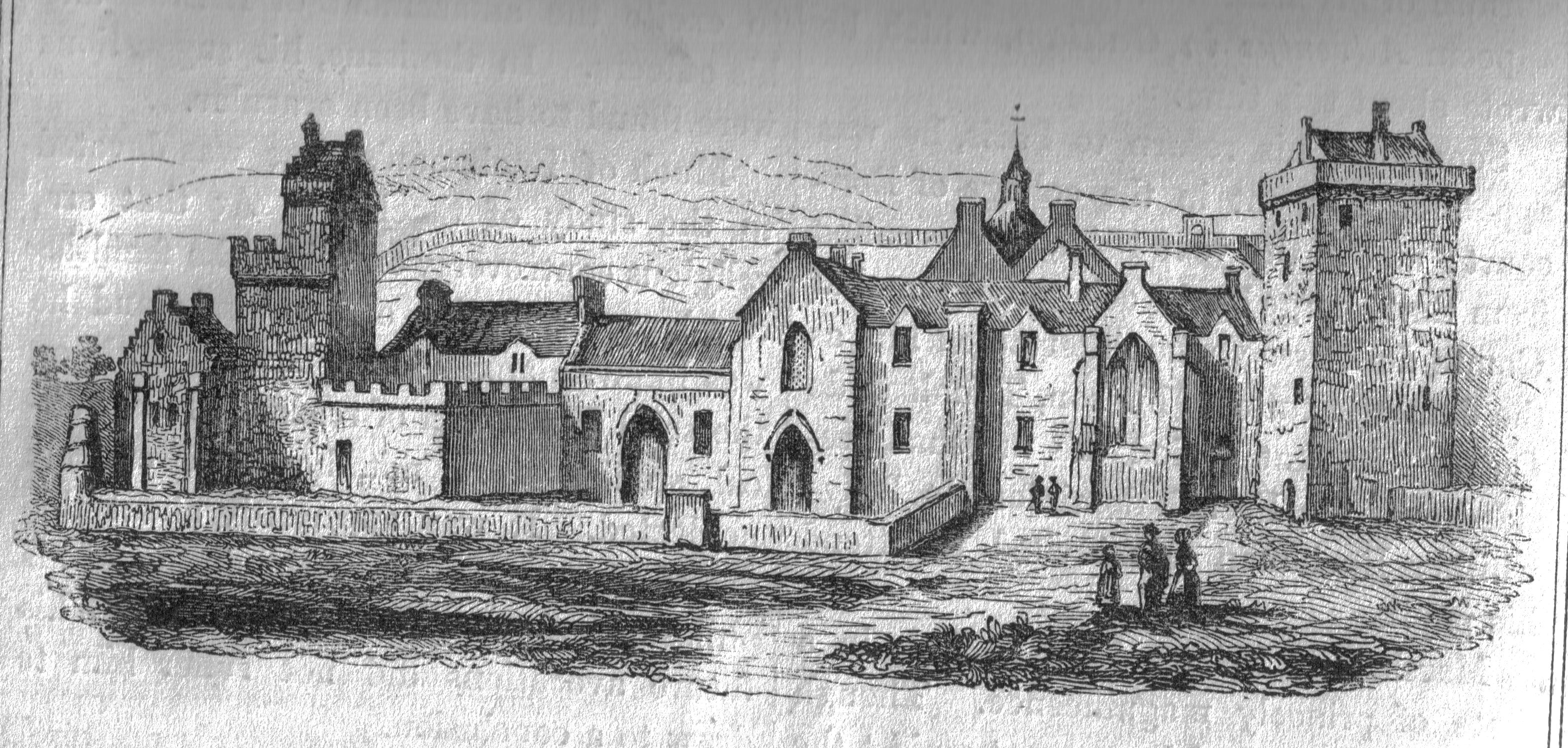
A 19th century engraving of how Crossraguel may have appeared from the south prior to its destruction.

The Abbey of Saint Mary of Crossraguel is a ruin of a former Cluniac abbey near the town of Maybole, South Ayrshire, Scotland. Although it is a ruin, visitors can still see the monks’ church, cloister and dovecote.

== Name ==
The origin of the abbey's name refers to the ancient Cross of Riaghail (Latin form St Regulus) that stood on the spot. Crossraguel was a Cluniac abbey and the monks - members of a branch of the Benedictines - were known as the "Black monks" after the colour of their habits.

== History ==
Crossraguel Abbey was founded in 1244 by Duncan, 1st Earl of Carrick. The earl sought assistance from the abbot and monks of Paisley Abbey and provided them with land and funds. However, the Paisley superiors built only a small chapel for Crossraguel and kept the remainder for themselves. Upset at this, the earl took the case to law, seeking assistance from the Bishop of Glasgow, who ruled on the earl's behalf. He required not only that Paisley build the monastery at Crossraguel, but also that some of the monks from Paisley should be transferred there. These monks were given the authority to choose their own abbot. The abbot of Paisley, it was decreed, was not to interfere with Crossraguel's affairs, though he was allowed a yearly visit. All of Paisley's possessions in Carrick were to be handed over to Crossraguel, a ruling which the abbot of Paisley appealed to the pope in 1265, but to no avail.

Crossraguel was sacked in 1307 by the army of Edward I. The opportunity was then taken to rebuild on a grander scale, which occupied much of the rest of the Middle Ages. Like Paisley Abbey, Crossraguel was of the Order of Cluny whose mission was to encourage pilgrimage. It is no accident then that Crossraguel is halfway between Paisley and Whithorn on the Ayrshire pilgrims' trail to the shrine of St Ninian in the Machars of Galloway.

In autumn, 1506, Montjoie (Gilbert Chauveau), French King of Arms, visited Crossraguel probably as part of his diplomatic missions regarding Scottish military support for King Hans (John) of Denmark. Montjoie had already spent time at the Court of King Henry VII of England before moving to Scotland and from there, visited Denmark. The record of him visiting Crossraguel is found in the Treasurer's Accounts of James IV, King of Scots – ‘Item, to Johne Beg, messingeir, to pas to Corsragwell and other places with writingis to warne of Montjoyis cummyng, ..... iiij s.’

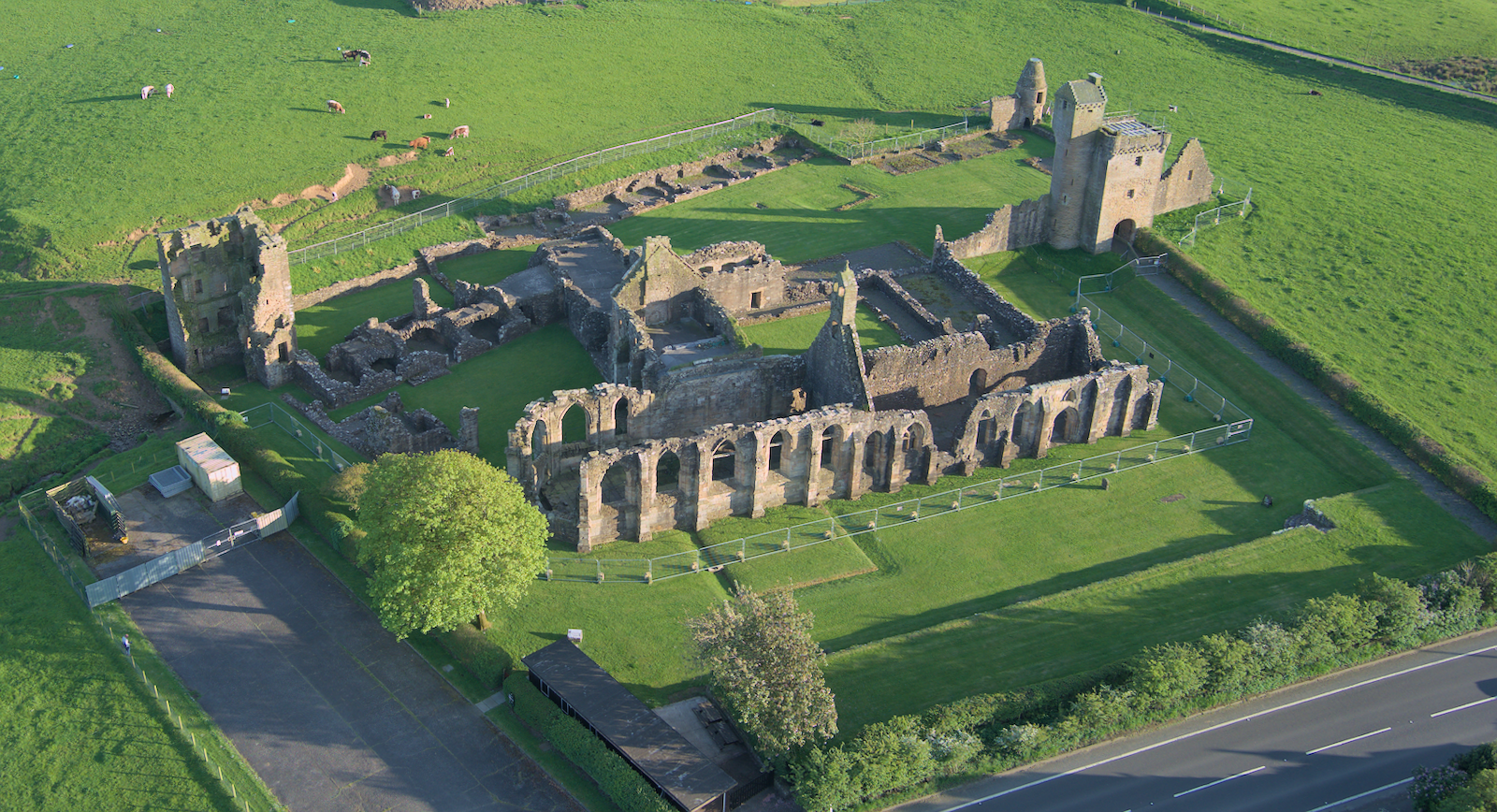
Aerial view from the north

Around 1510, directed by David Kennedy, 1st Earl of Cassillis, with encouragement from James IV, monks at Crossraguel developed production of salt by the boiling sea water in pans, and the grinding of charcoal for gunpowder.

In 1570, the Kennedy family, Earls of Cassillis famously obtained the lands of Crossraguel Abbey through the torturing by Gilbert Kennedy, 4th Earl of Cassillis of Allan Stewart, the commendator at his castle of Dunure. A feud followed involving a number of families and lasting until at least 1611. The Reformation (c. 1560) led to the destruction of many abbeys but Crossraguel was not badly damaged; nonetheless, monastic life here ceased when the last monk died in 1601.

James VI intended to rebuild the abbey or abbot's house in 1603 for the use of his son, Prince Henry. In December 1612 James VI granted the former abbey to Peter Hewat, minister at St Giles Cathedral in Edinburgh who owned it until his death in 1645.

=== Present day ===
Since the Reformation, some of the stone has been removed for local construction, but the abbey ruins remain among the most complete of any medieval religious house to survive in Scotland. The site is maintained by Historic Environment Scotland as a scheduled monument and is open to the public with an entrance charge. The VisitScotland website describes the property as follows: "Although a ruin, the Crossraguel Abbey is still complete with the original monks’ church, their cloister and even their dovecot (pigeon tower). Fine architectural details from the 15th century can still be seen within the ruins with the chapter house still standing complete with benches for the monks and an arched seat for the abbot." Visitors are also able to climb the stairs to the top of the gatehouse tower.

== See also ==
- Abbot of Crossraguel, for list of abbots and commendators
- Abbeys and priories in Scotland
