= Ayrshire =

Coordinates: 55°30′N 4°30′W

Ayrshire Siorrachd Inbhir Àir (Scottish Gaelic)
- Historic county
- Ayrshire shown within Scotland
- Interactive map of Ayrshire
- Country: Scotland
- County town: Ayr

Area
  - Total: 1,129 sq mi (2,924 km^{2})
- Ranked 7th of 34
- Chapman code: AYR

Ayrshire (Scottish Gaelic: Siorrachd Inbhir Àir, pronounced [ˈʃirˠəxk iɲiˈɾʲaːɾʲ]) is an historic county and registration county, in south-west Scotland, located on the shores of the Firth of Clyde. The lieutenancy area of Ayrshire and Arran covers the entirety of the historic county as well as the island of Arran, formerly part of the historic county of Buteshire. Its principal towns include Ayr, Kilmarnock and Irvine and it borders the counties of Renfrew and Lanark to the north-east, Dumfriesshire to the south-east, and Kirkcudbrightshire and Wigtownshire to the south. Like many other counties of Scotland, it currently has no administrative function, instead being sub-divided into the council areas of East Ayrshire, North Ayrshire and South Ayrshire. It has a population of approximately 366,800.

The electoral and valuation area named Ayrshire covers the three council areas of East Ayrshire, North Ayrshire and South Ayrshire, therefore covering the whole historic county of Ayrshire but also including the Isle of Arran, Great Cumbrae and Little Cumbrae from the historic county of Buteshire. The three council areas together also form the Ayrshire and Arran lieutenancy area.

The largest settlement in Ayrshire by population is Kilmarnock, closely followed by Ayr, the county town.

== Geography ==
Ayrshire is roughly crescent-shaped and is a predominantly flat county with areas of low hills; it forms part of the Southern Uplands geographic region of Scotland. The north of the county contains the main towns and bulk of the population. East of Largs can be found the Renfrewshire Heights, which continue south to the hill-country around Blae Loch.

Southern Ayrshire shares with the Galloway counties some rugged hill country known as the Galloway Hills. These hills lie to the west of the A713 (Ayr to Castle Douglas road) and they run south from the Loch Doon area almost to the Solway Firth. To the east of this route through the hills lie the Carsphairn and Scaur Hills which lie to the south east of Dalmellington and south of New Cumnock. Glen Afton runs deep into these hills.

Ayrshire is one of the most agriculturally fertile regions of Scotland. Potatoes are grown in fields near the coast, using seaweed-based fertiliser, and in addition the region produces pork products, other root vegetables, and cattle (see below); and summer berries such as strawberries are grown abundantly.

A number of small islands in the Firth of Clyde are part of Ayrshire, the chief of these being Horse Isle, Lady Isle and Ailsa Craig.

=== Rivers ===
The main rivers flowing to the Clyde coast are, from north to south, the following:

- River Garnock
- River Irvine
- River Ayr
- River Doon
- River Girvan
- River Stinchar
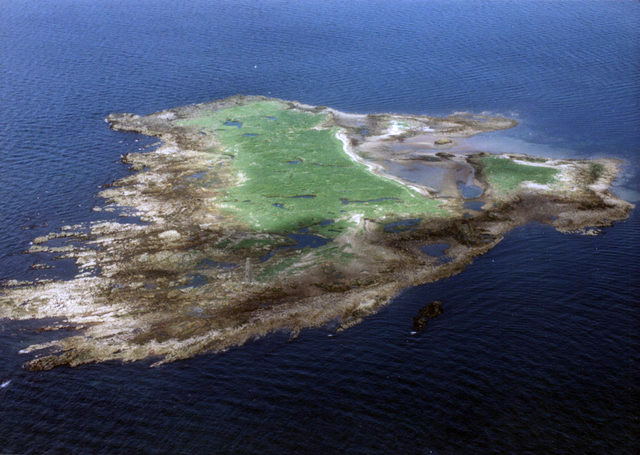
Horse Isle

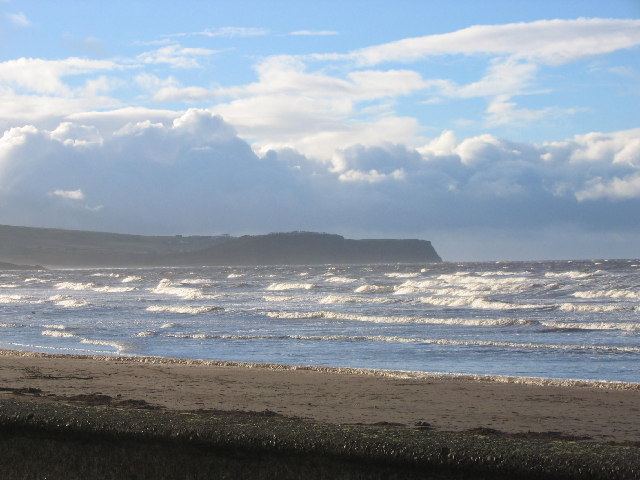
Part of Ayr Beach with the Heads of Ayr in the background

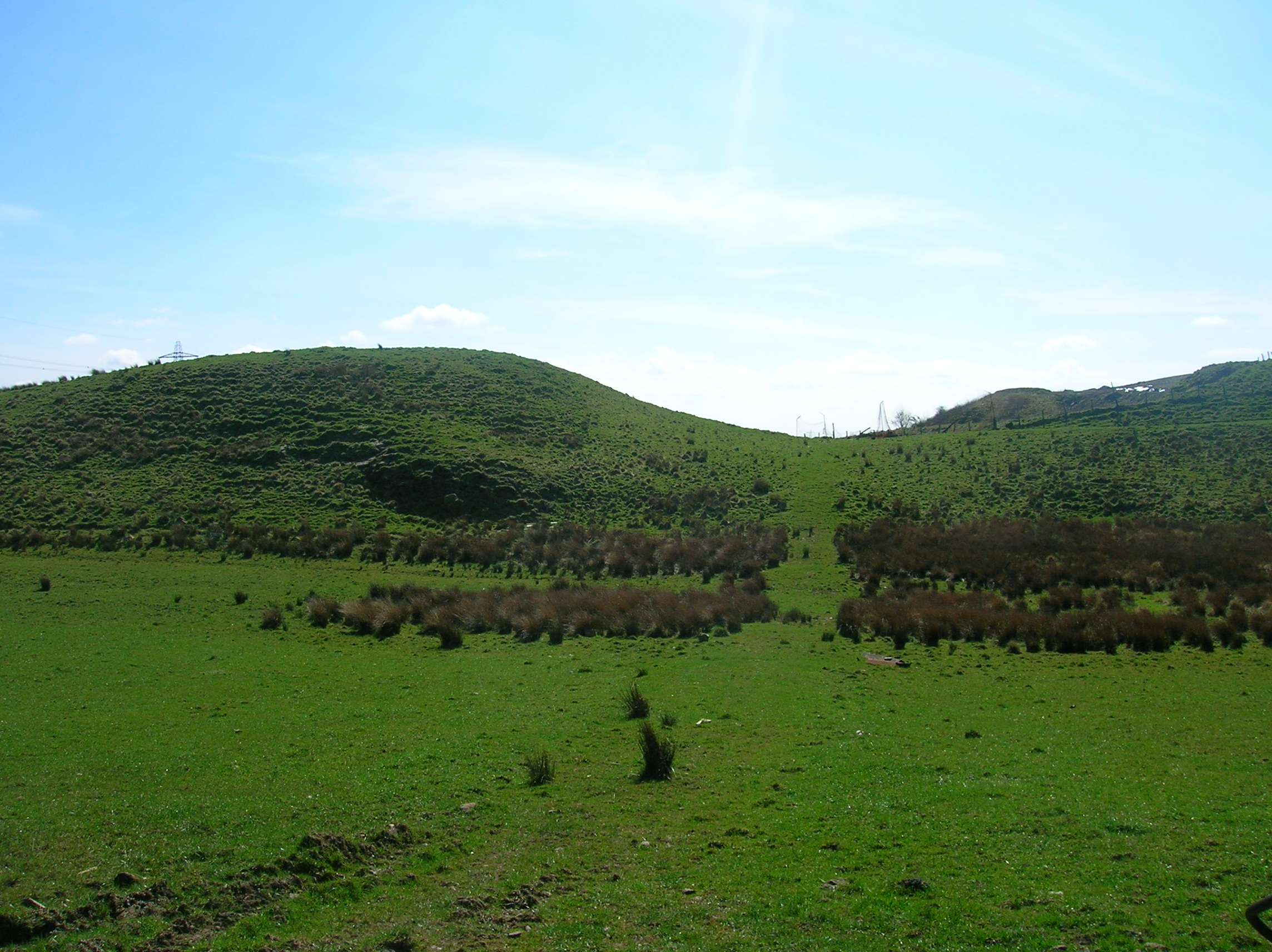
Boyd's Hill near Dunlop

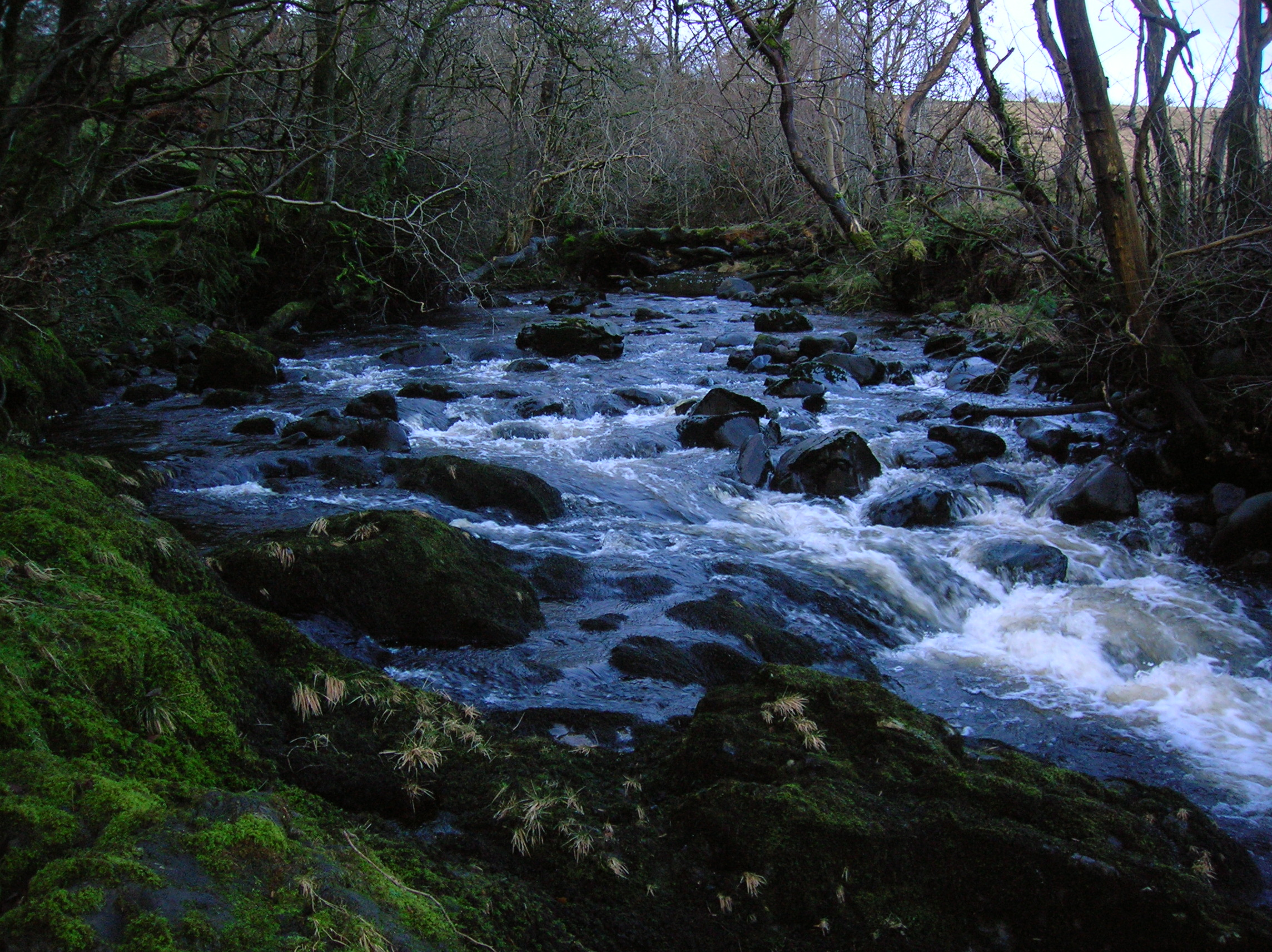
The Garnock's Waters near Glengarnock Castle

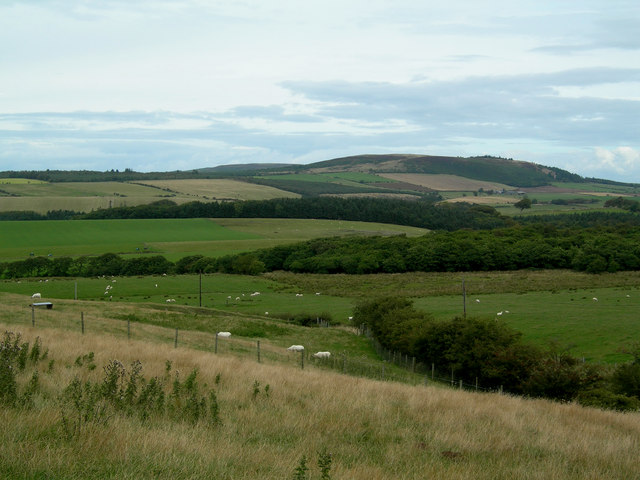
Mochrum Hill near Kirkoswald

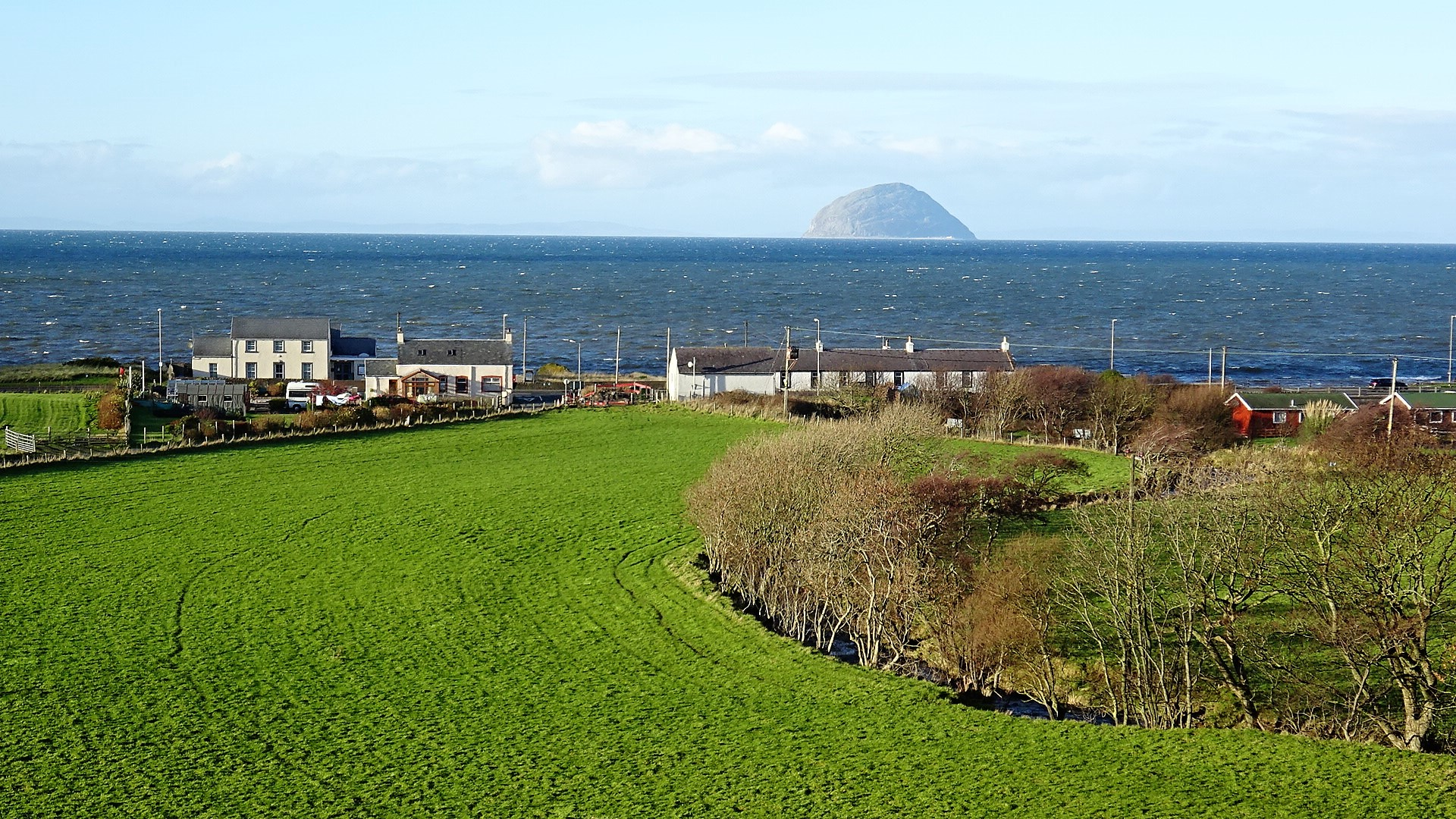
Lendalfoot coast, with Ailsa Craig in the distance

== History ==
The area that today forms Ayrshire was part of the area south of the Antonine Wall which was briefly occupied by the Romans during the reign of Emperor Antoninus Pius (see: Roman Britain#Occupation and retreat from southern Scotland). It was inhabited by the Damnonii, who are presumed to have been Britons. Later, it formed part of the British Kingdom of Strathclyde, which was incorporated into the Kingdom of Scotland during the 11th century. In 1263, the Scots successfully drove off the Norwegian leidang-army in a skirmish known as the Battle of Largs.

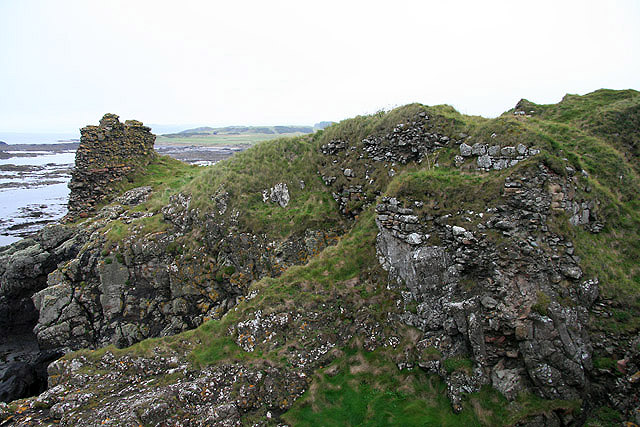
The remains of Turnberry Castle

A notable historic building in Ayrshire is Turnberry Castle, which dates from the 13th century or earlier, and which may have been the birthplace of Robert the Bruce.

The historic shire or sheriffdom of Ayr was divided into three districts or bailieries which later made up the county of Ayrshire. The three districts were:

- Carrick in the south. It was situated between the Doon and the wild district of Galloway in the adjoining Stewartries, an area that was little else than a vast tract of hills and mosses.
- Kyle in the centre, which included the royal burgh of Ayr, occupied the central district between the River Irvine in the north, and the River Doon in the south and south-west, an area that is quite hilly inland. It was subdivided into "Kyle Stewart", (sometimes called "Stewart Kyle" or "Walter's Kyle") and "King's Kyle," the former embracing the country between the Irvine and the River Ayr; and the latter, the triangular portion between the Ayr and the Doon, which is honoured as the birthplace and youthful home of Robert Burns.
- Cunninghame in the north which included the royal burgh of Irvine was that part of the county which lay north of the Irvine water, and was in an area that is generally level and fertile.

The area used to be heavily industrialised, with steel making, coal mining and in Kilmarnock numerous examples of production-line manufacturing, most famously Johnnie Walker whisky. In more recent history, Digital Equipment had a large manufacturing plant near Ayr from about 1976 until the company was taken over by Compaq in 1998. Some supplier companies grew up to service this site and the more distant IBM plant at Greenock in Renfrewshire. Scotland's aviation industry has long been based in and around Prestwick and its international airport, and although aircraft manufacture ceased at the former British Aerospace plant in 1998, a significant number of aviation companies are still based on the Prestwick site. However, unemployment in the region (excluding the more rural South Ayrshire) is above the national average.

Throughout the 17th century, huge numbers of people from Ayrshire moved to Ulster, the northern province in Ireland, as part of the Plantation of Ulster, many of them with surnames such as Burns, Hamilton, Morrow, Stewart, Flanagan, Kennedy and Cunningham. Today, the Ulster Scots dialect is largely an offshoot of the version of Lowland Scots spoken in Ayrshire. The Ulster Scots dialect is still widely spoken throughout County Antrim and in parts of County Down and County Londonderry, as well as still being widely spoken in West Tír Eoghain and parts of County Donegal (chiefly East Donegal and Inishowen).

== Local government ==
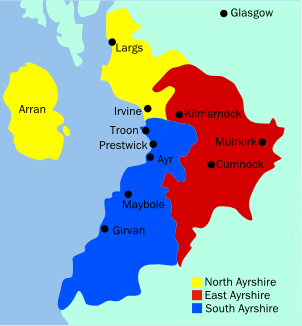
The administrative subdivisions covering Ayrshire. Arran is administered as part of the North Ayrshire council area, but is historically part of Buteshire.

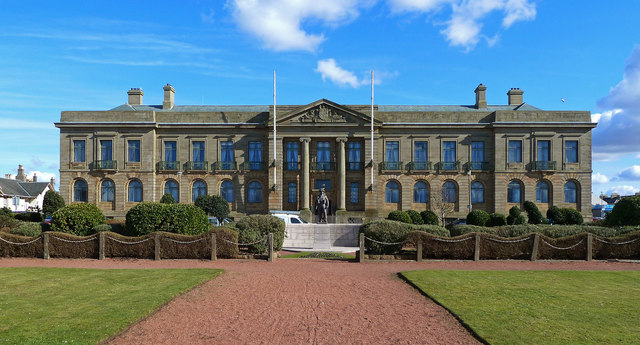
County Buildings, the former headquarters of Ayrshire County Council

Commissioners of Supply were created in 1667 for each shire, and formed the main administrative body for the area until county councils were created in 1890 under the Local Government (Scotland) Act 1889. The 1889 act also led to a review of boundaries of many of Scotland's counties; in the case of Ayrshire the two parishes of Beith and Dunlop, which had both straddled Ayrshire and Renfrewshire, were brought entirely within Ayrshire. The burghs of Ayr and Kilmarnock were both excluded from the area controlled by the county council when it was created in 1890, being deemed capable of running their own services.

In 1930 the Local Government (Scotland) Act 1929 was implemented. This brought Ayr and Kilmarnock under the control of the county council, and re-designated all burghs as either large burghs or small burghs. Ayr and Kilmarnock were both classed as large burghs, allowing them to retain control of many functions, whilst the county's other burghs were all classed as small burghs, ceding many functions to the county council. The 1929 act also abolished the parish councils. In Ayrshire in excess of 30 parishes were consolidated into ten district councils. The District Councils were Ayr, Cumnock, Dalmellington, Girvan, Irvine, Kilbirnie, Kilmarnock, Maybole, Troon and Saltcoats. Ayrshire County Council was based at County Buildings in Wellington Square in Ayr.

In May 1975 the county council was abolished and its functions were transferred to Strathclyde Regional Council. The county area was divided between four new districts within the two-tier Strathclyde region: Cumnock and Doon Valley, Cunninghame, Kilmarnock and Loudoun and Kyle and Carrick. The Cunninghame district included the Isle of Arran, Great Cumbrae and Little Cumbrae, which had until then been administered as part of the County of Bute. For lieutenancy purposes, the last lord-lieutenant of the county of Ayrshire was made lord-lieutenant for the combined area of the four districts when the reforms came into effect in 1975, with the lieutenancy area being renamed Ayrshire and Arran in 1996.

In 1996 the two-tier system of regions and districts was abolished and Ayrshire was divided between the unitary council areas of East Ayrshire (covering the area of the former Kilmarnock & Loudoun District and Cumnock & Doon Valley District), North Ayrshire (covering the area of the former Cunninghame District Council) and South Ayrshire (covering the area of the former Kyle and Carrick District).

The boundaries of the historic county of Ayrshire are still used for some limited official purposes connected with land registration, being a registration county.

== Parliamentary constituencies ==
There was an Ayrshire constituency of the House of Commons of the Parliament of Great Britain from 1708 to 1801 and of the Parliament of the United Kingdom from 1801 until 1868, when the constituency was divided into Ayrshire North and Ayrshire South.

During the whole of the 1708 to 1868 period, and until 1950, the burghs of Ayr and Irvine were parliamentary burghs, represented as components of Ayr Burghs. In 1832 Kilmarnock became a parliamentary burgh, to be represented as a component of Kilmarnock Burghs until 1918. Ayr Burghs and Kilmarnock Burghs were districts of burghs, and quite different in character from later Ayr and Kilmarnock constituencies.

From 1918 to 1983 Ayrshire and Buteshire were treated as if a single area for purposes of parliamentary representation, with their combined area being divided into different constituencies at different times. Scottish local government counties were abolished in 1975, in favour of regions and districts, but the next reform of constituency boundaries was not until 1983.

Constituencies covering Ayrshire may be listed by periods as below, but the story is somewhat more complicated than the lists may imply: until 1918, Ayr Burghs and Kilmarnock Burghs included burghs lying outside both Ayrshire and Buteshire; a particular constituency name may represent different boundaries in different periods; in 1974, there were boundary changes without the creation of any new constituency names.

Period	Constituencies
1708 to 1832	Ayrshire and Ayr Burghs
1832 to 1868	Ayrshire, Kilmarnock Burghs and Ayr Burghs
1868 to 1918	North Ayrshire, Kilmarnock Burghs, Ayr Burghs and South Ayrshire
1918 to 1950	Bute and Northern Ayrshire, Kilmarnock, Ayr Burghs and South Ayrshire
1950 to 1983	Bute and Northern Ayrshire, Central Ayrshire, Kilmarnock, Ayr and South Ayrshire

== Transport ==
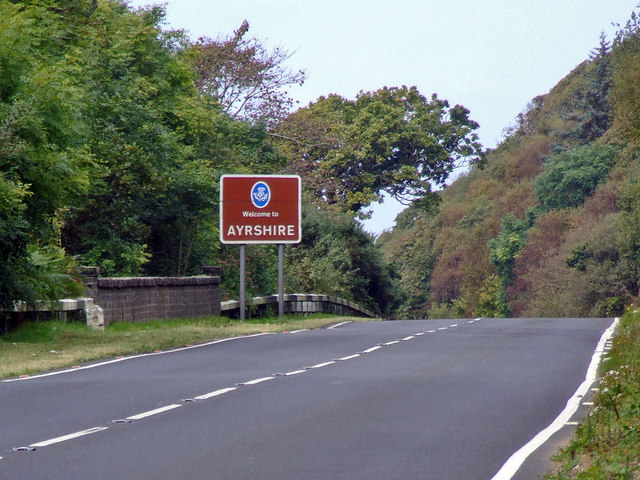
Entering Ayrshire on the northbound A77

A number of railway lines connect the towns of northern Ayrshire to each other and also to Glasgow, as well as south to Stranraer and south-east to Dumfries.

Ferries link Ayrshire to the islands of Arran and Great Cumbrae in Buteshire.

Glasgow Prestwick International Airport, serving Glasgow and the west of Scotland more generally, is located 32 miles (51 km) away from Glasgow in Ayrshire; it provides various passenger flights to Spain, Portugal, Italy and Poland. The name Glasgow was added in front of Prestwick as per American military airport naming conventions, as the airport was in the past oft-used as a stopover by US military personnel on their way to and from military bases in Germany. Moreover, it is known in rock history as the only place in Britain visited by Elvis Presley, on his way home from army service in Germany in 1960.

== Towns and villages in Ayrshire ==
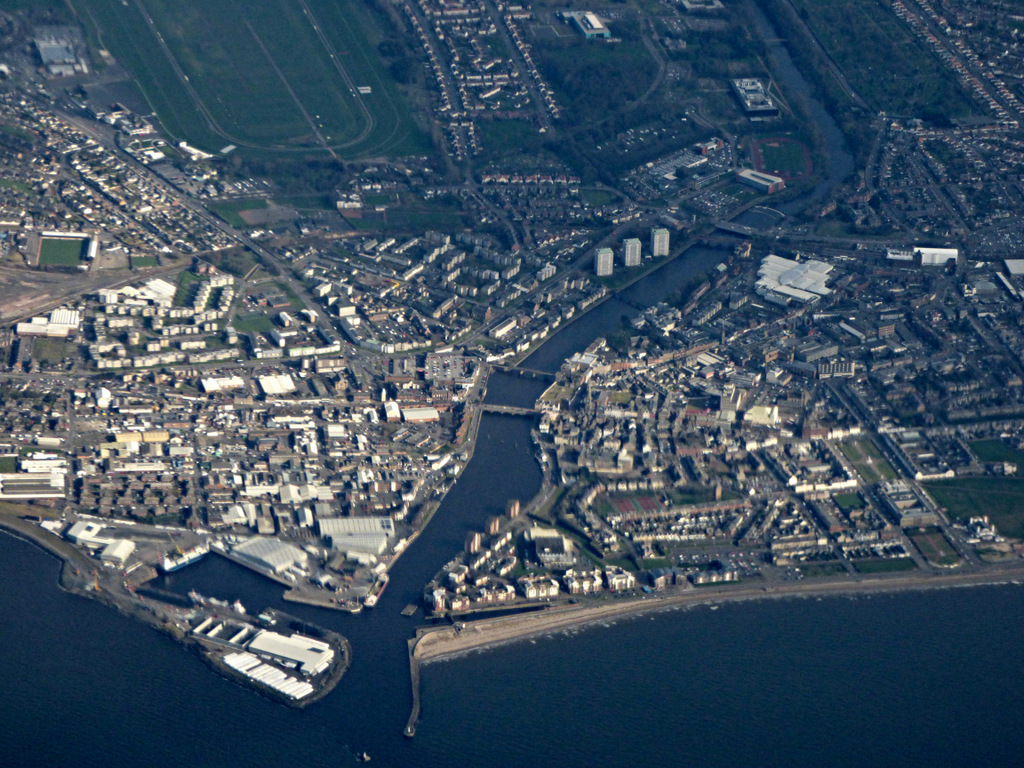
Ayr, county town of Ayrshire

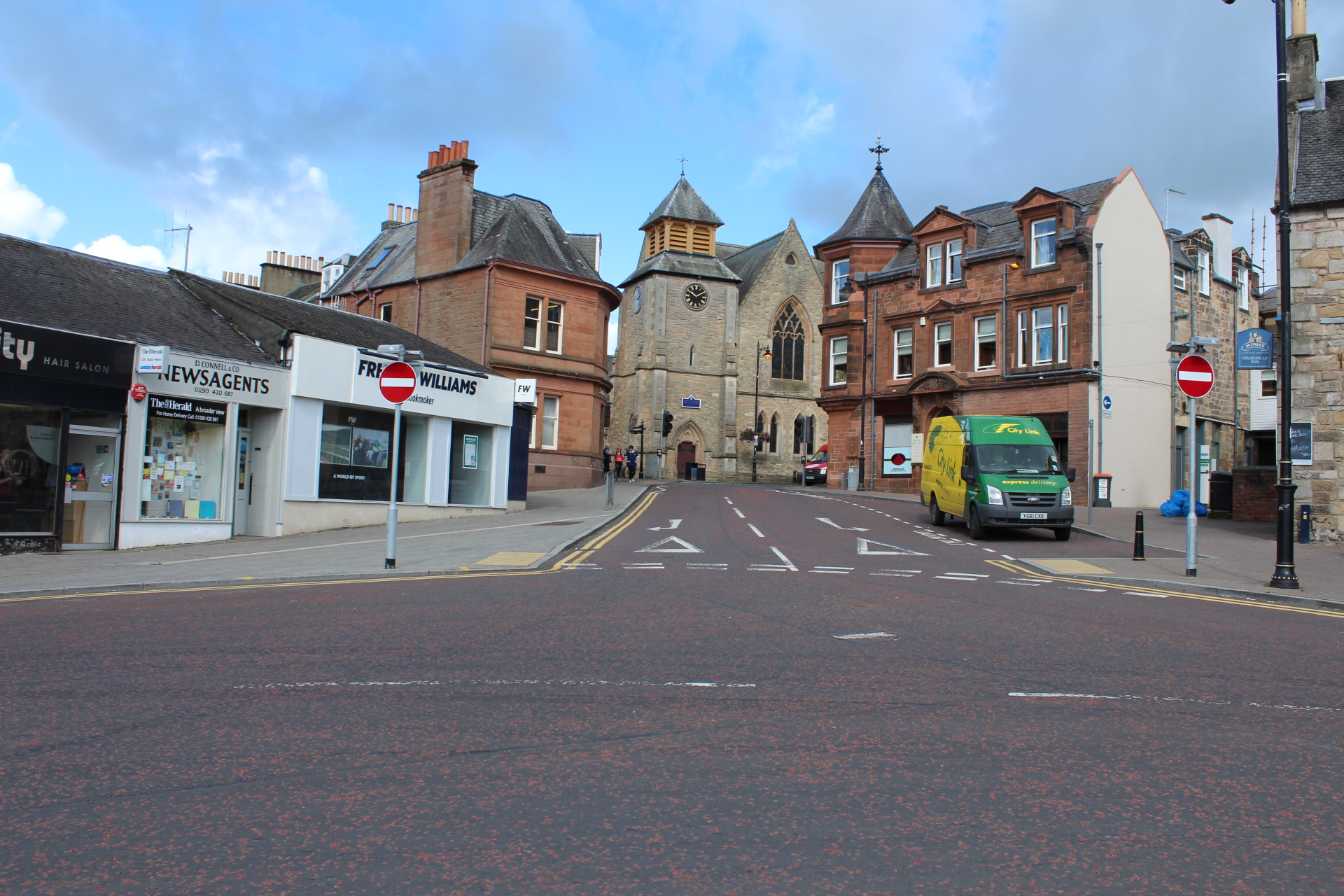
Cumnock

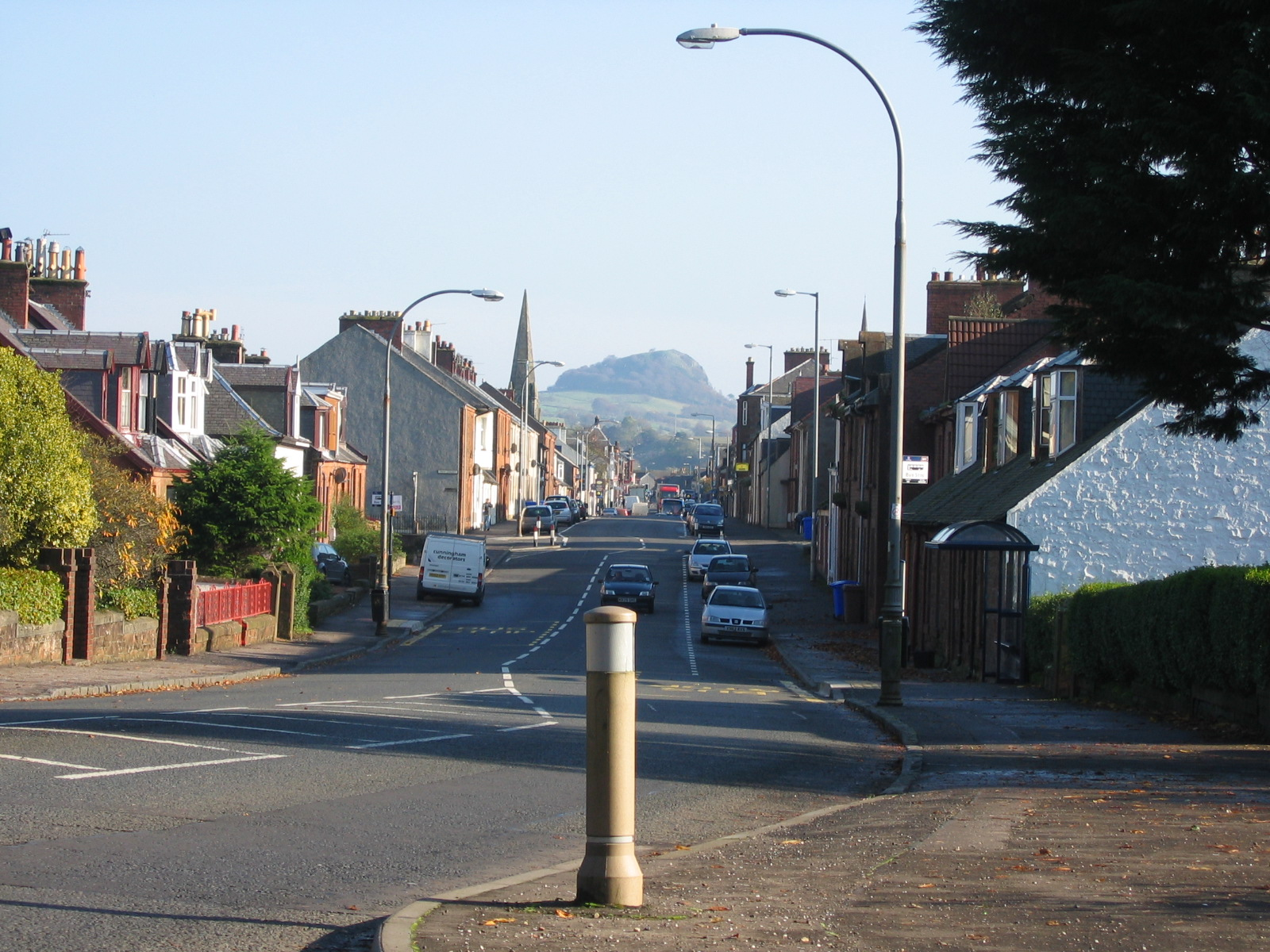
Darvel

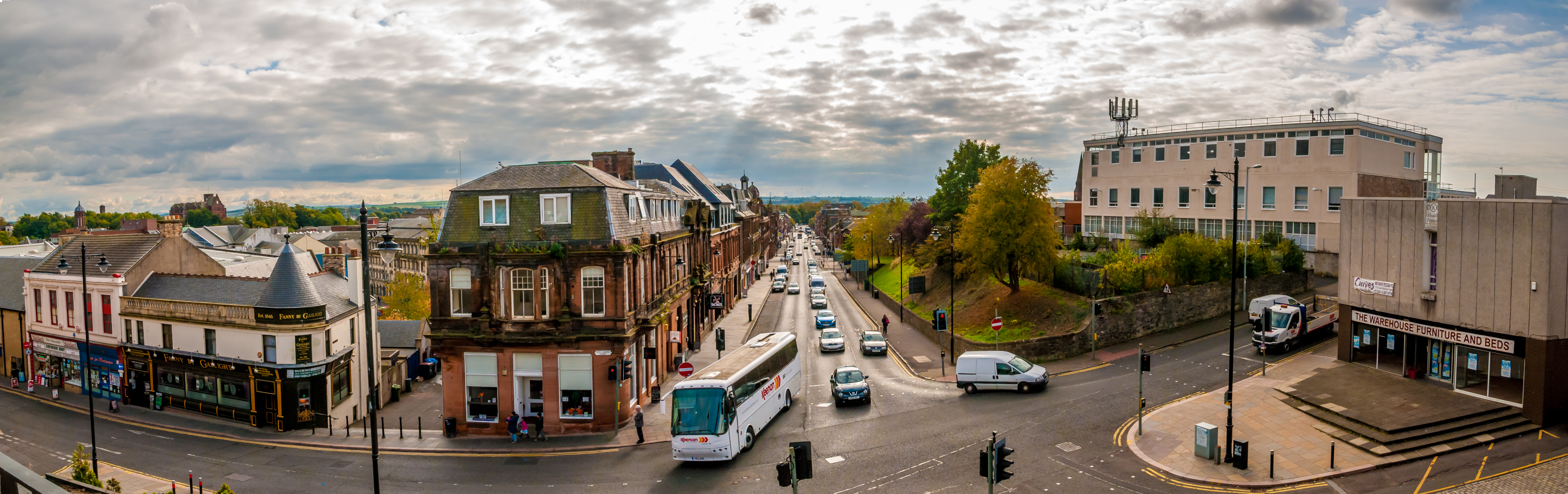
Kilmarnock

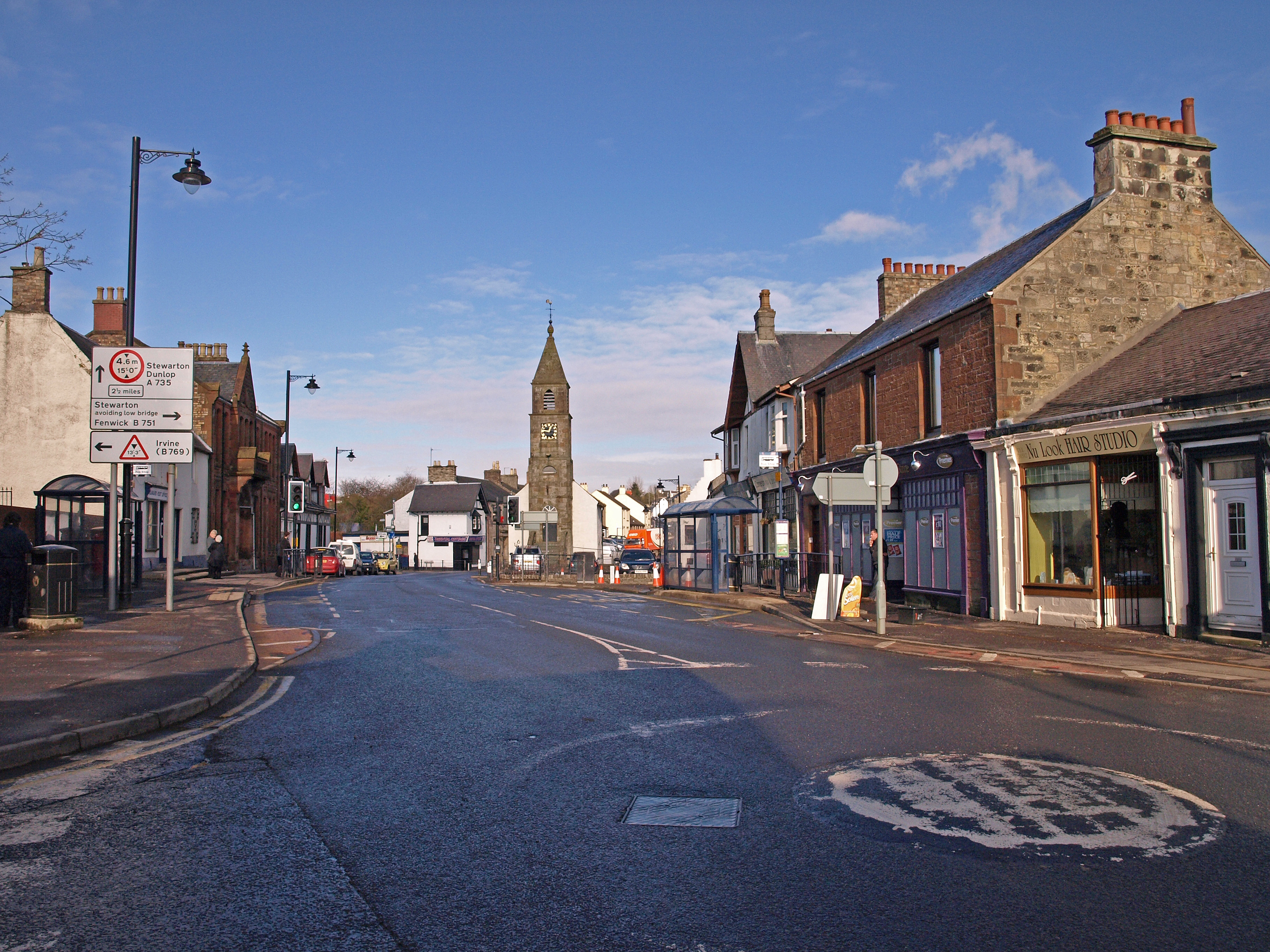
Kilmaurs

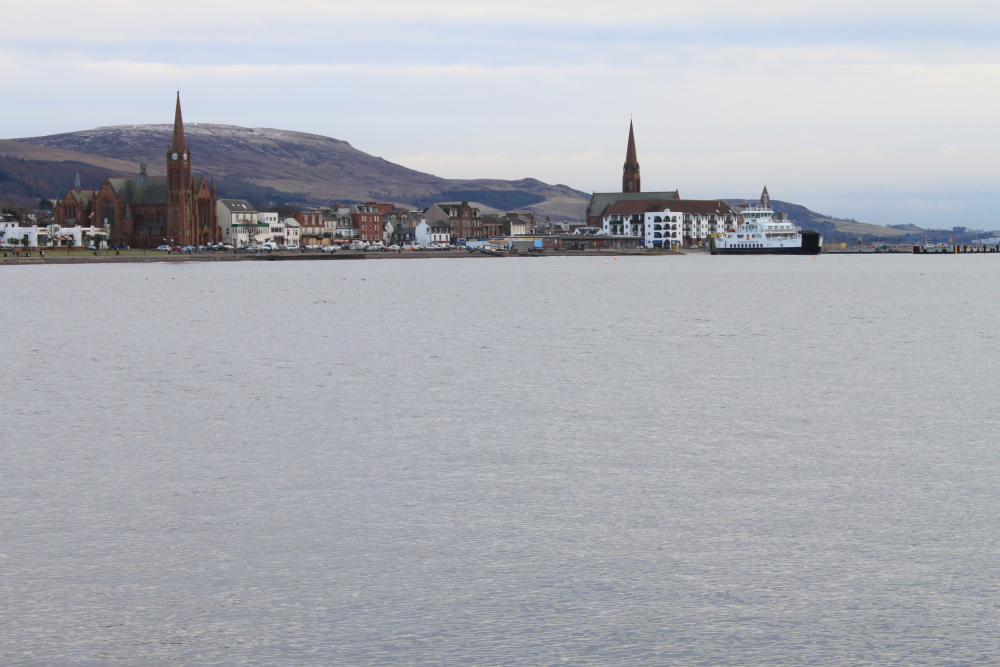
Largs

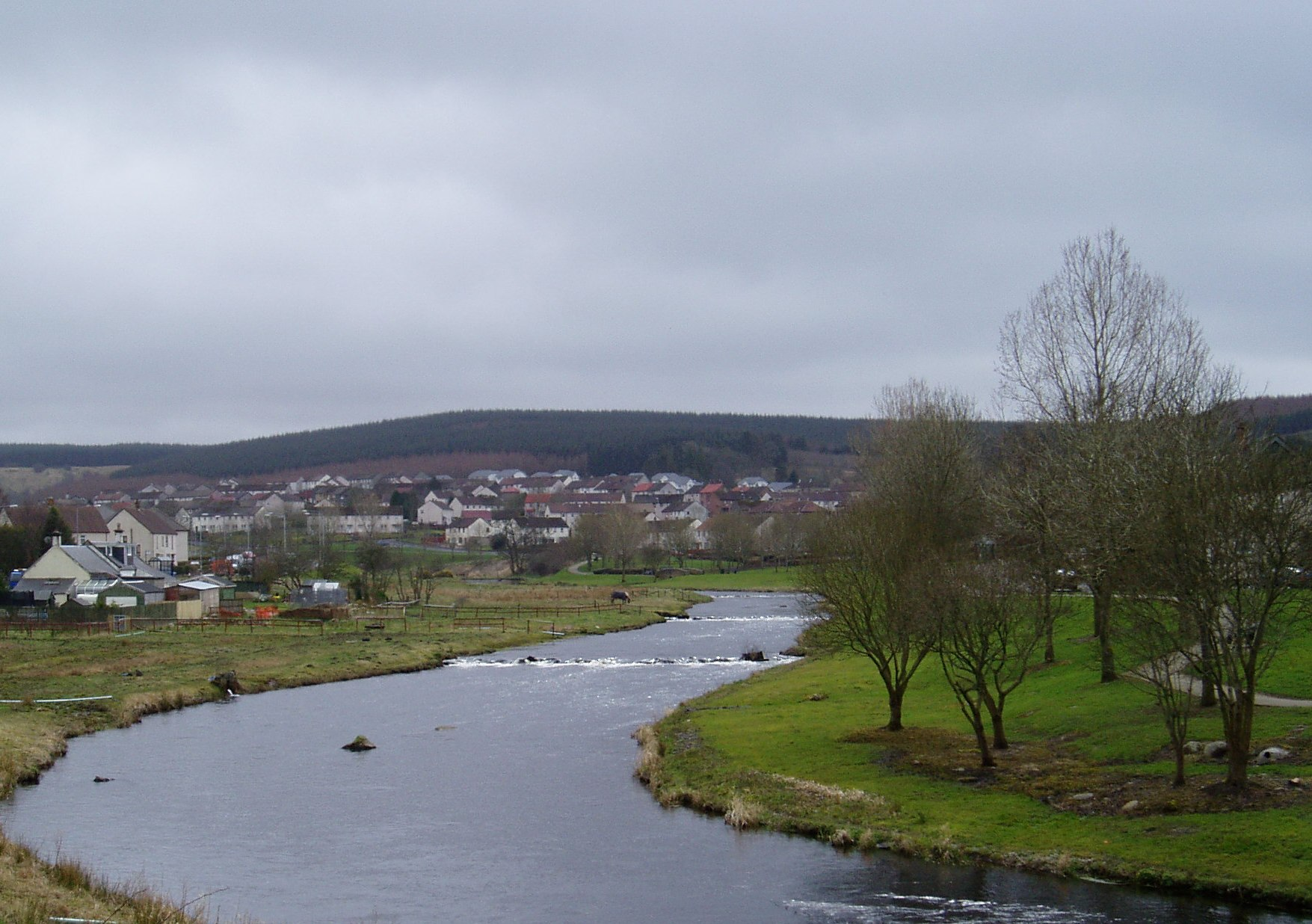
Patna

- Alloway
- Ardrossan
- Annbank
- Ardeer
- Auchentiber
- Auchinleck
- Ayr
- Ballantrae
- Barassie
- Barkip
- Barr
- Barrhill
- Barrmill
- Beith
- Bellsbank
- Belmont
- Benslie
- Bourtreehill
- Broomlands
- Burnhouse
- Catrine
- Colmonell
- Coylton
- Craigie
- Craigmalloch
- Cronberry
- Crosshill
- Crosshouse
- Cumnock
- Cunninghamhead
- Dailly
- Dalgarven
- Dalmellington
- Dalry
- Dalrymple
- Darvel
- Doonfoot
- Drakemyre
- Dreghorn
- Drongan
- Drybridge
- Dundonald
- Dunlop
- Dunure
- Fairlie
- Fenwick
- Fergushill
- Fullarton
- Galston
- Gatehead
- Gateside
- Giffordland
- Girdle Toll
- Girvan
- Glenbuck
- Glengarnock
- Greenhills
- Hansel
- Haugh
- Heathfield
- Hessilhead hamlet
- Highfield
- Hurlford
- Irvine
- Joppa
- Kilbirnie
- Kilmarnock
- Kilmaurs
- Kilwinning
- Kincaidston
- Kirkmichael
- Kirkoswald
- Knockentiber
- Largs
- Lendalfoot
- Loans
- Logan
- Longbar
- Lugton
- Lugar
- Lylestone
- Mauchline
- Maidens
- Maybole
- Meikle Auchengree
- Minishant
- Monkton
- Moscow
- Montgreenan
- Mossblown
- Muirkirk
- Netherthird
- New Cumnock
- Newmilns
- Ochiltree
- Old Dailly
- Patna
- Pinmore
- Pinwherry
- Polnessan
- Portencross
- Prestwick
- Priestland
- Rankinston
- Riccarton
- Saltcoats
- Seafield
- Seamill
- Skelmorlie
- Sorn
- Springside
- Stair
- Stevenston
- Stewarton
- Straiton
- Symington
- Tarbolton
- Torranyard
- Trabboch
- Troon
- Turnberry
- Waterside
- West Kilbride

== Places of interest ==
- Auchenharvie Castle
- Barony and Castle of Giffen
- Cleeves Cove
- Clyde Muirshiel Regional Park
- Corsehill
- Culzean Castle
- Dalgarven Mill – Museum of Ayrshire Country Life and Costume
- Dean Castle - Kilmarnock
- Eglinton Country Park
- Laigh Milton viaduct
- Thurgartstone
- Ayr Seafront Playpark
- Burns National Heritage Park
- The Low Green, Ayr
- Turnberry (golf course)

== People from Ayrshire ==
- Hew Ainslie (1792–1878), poet
- Nicola Benedetti (1987–), classical violinist born in West Kilbride
- Sir Thomas Brisbane (1773–1860), soldier and colonial administrator, after whom the city of Brisbane is named. Born in Largs.
- John Boyd Orr (1880–1971), Nobel Peace Prize winner, born in Kilmaurs.
- George Douglas Brown (1869–1902), novelist, best known for The House with the Green Shutters, born in Ochiltree
- Robert the Bruce (1274–1329), possibly born in Turnberry Castle
- Robert Burns (1759–1796), poet, born in Alloway
- Kenneth Campbell (1917–1941), RAF pilot and posthumous recipient of the Victoria Cross, born in Ardrossan
- James McCosh Clark (1833–1898), mayor of Auckland, born in Beith
- Robert Craufurd (1764–1812), British major general
- John Dunlop (1840–1921), inventor of the pneumatic tyre, born in Dreghorn
- Robert Dunsmuir (1825–1889), coal baron and industrial capitalist on Vancouver Island, Canada
- Henry Faulds (1843–1930), doctor, missionary and scientist, born in Beith
- Andrew Fisher (1862–1928), 5th Prime Minister of Australia (1908–1909, 1910–1913 and 1914–1915)
- Sir Alexander Fleming (1881–1955), inventor/discoverer of penicillin, born in Darvel
- John Galt (1779–1839), author
- Colin Hay (1953–), singer and former lead-singer of Australian band Men At Work, born in Saltcoats
- Air Chief Marshal Angus Houston (1947–), current Australian Chief of Defence Force
- George Houston (1869–1947), landscape painter of Scottish locales, born in Dalry
- Tom Hunter (1961–), entrepreneur and philanthropist
- Jenny Lindsay (1982–), poet
- The MacDonald Brothers, recording artists and contestants on The X Factor
- Sir James MacMillan (1959–), classical composer and conductor
- John McAdam (1756–1836), engineer and inventor of macadam
- James McCosh (1811–1894), philosopher of the Scottish School of Common Sense and president of what would become Princeton University
- Jai McDowall (1986–), winner of Britain's Got Talent in 2011
- Hugh McIlvanney (1934–2019), sports journalist, born in Kilmarnock
- William McIlvanney (1936–2015), writer, born in Kilmarnock
- Sir Thomas McKillop, (1943–) CEO of AstraZeneca, born in Dreghorn
- James Henry McLean (1806–1886), physician and United States Congressman from Missouri
- Colin Mochrie (1957–), improvisational comedian and actor best known for being in Whose Line Is It Anyway?, born in Kilmarnock
- William Murdoch (1754–1839), inventor of gas lighting and engineer
- Simon Neil (1979–), James Johnston (1980–), and Ben Johnston (1980–) of Biffy Clyro
- Bruce Milligan Nicol, OBE (1913–1987), physician and nutrition scientist
- Alexander Peden (1626–1686), leading figure in the Covenanter movement
- Robert Simson (1687–1768), mathematician and professor of mathematics for 50 years
- Elaine Smith (1962–), former actress who emigrated to Australia and found fame on television series Neighbours in 1985 as original character Daphne Clarke.
- Nicola Sturgeon (1970–), former First Minister of Scotland, born in Irvine

=== Sports ===
- Kimberly Benson (1991–), professional wrestler best known as Piper Niven and for her work in WWE and ICW
- Kris Boyd (1983–), footballer, born in Irvine
- Kirk Broadfoot (1984–), footballer, born in Irvine
- Craig Burley (1971–), footballer, born in Ayr
- George Burley (1956–), football manager and former player, born in Cumnock
- Paul Caddis (1988–), football manager and former player, born in Irvine
- Eric Caldow (1934–2019), footballer, born in Cumnock
- Steve Clarke (1963–), football manager and former player, born in Saltcoats
- Paul Clarke (1956–), footballer, born in Ardrossan
- Neill Collins (1983–), football manager and former player, born in Troon
- Craig Conway (1985–), footballer, born in Irvine
- Elsie Cook (1947–), footballer and former secretary of Scottish Women’s FA, born in Stewarton
- Erin Cuthbert (1998–), footballer, born in Irvine
- Noam Dar (1993–), professional wrestler signed to WWE performing on the NXT UK and 205 Live brands
- Ben Doak (2005–), footballer, born in Dalry
- Billy Dodds (1969–), football manager and former player, born in New Cumnock
- Kris Doolan (1986–), football manager and former player, born in Irvine
- Julie Fleeting (1980–), footballer, born in Kilwinning
- Alan Forrest (1996–), footballer, born in Irvine
- James Forrest (1991–), footballer, born in Prestwick
- Drew Galloway (1985–), professional wrestler who performs on WWE's Smackdown brand as Drew McIntyre
- Billy Gilmour (2001–), footballer, born in Irvine
- Jamie Hamill (1986–), football manager and former player, born in Irvine
- Garry Hay (1977–), footballer, born in Irvine
- Jack Hendry (1995–), footballer, raised in Annbank
- Gary Holt (1973–), football manager and former player, born in Irvine
- Bobby Lennox (1943–), footballer, born in Saltcoats
- Lou Macari (1949–), football manager and former player, raised in Largs
- Robby McCrorie (1998–), footballer, born in Dailly
- Ross McCrorie (1998–), footballer, born in Dailly
- Alan McInally (1963–), footballer, born in Ayr
- Rory McKenzie (1993–), footballer, born in Irvine
- Gordon McQueen (1952–2023), footballer, born in Kilbirnie
- Steven Naismith (1986–), football manager and former player, born in Irvine
- Jamie Ness (1991–), footballer, born in Irvine
- Steve Nicol (1961–), footballer, born in Irvine
- Graeme Obree (1965–), cyclist, raised in Irvine
- Jemma Reekie (1998–), middle-distance runner, raised in Beith
- Rose Reilly (1955–), footballer, born in Kilmarnock
- Craig Samson (1984–), footballer, born in Irvine
- Bill Shankly (1913–1981), football manager, born in Glenbuck
- Bob Shankly (1910–1982) football manager, born in Glenbuck
- Ryan Stevenson (1984–), football manager and former player, born in Irvine
- Ross Stewart (1996–), footballer, born in Irvine
- Gordon Smith (1954–), footballer, born in Kilwinning
- Sam Torrance (1953–), professional golfer, born in Largs
- David Watson (2005–), footballer, born in Prestwick

== See also ==
- Potato Labour Scandal 1971
