= Bruce M. Nicol =

Scottish physician and nutrition scientist

Bruce Milligan Nicol OBE
- Born: March 24, 1913; Ayrshire, Scotland
- Died: November 29, 1987 (aged 74)
- Education: Edinburgh Academy; University of Aberdeen
- Occupations: physician, nutrition scientist

Bruce Milligan Nicol, OBE (born 24 March 1913 in Ayrshire, Scotland; died 29 November 1987) was a Scottish physician and nutrition scientist, renowned for his extensive research on Nigerian foods and nutrition. His work contributed significantly to the understanding of nutrition in developing regions, particularly in the context of tropical food production.

== Early life and education ==
Bruce Milligan Nicol was born on March 24, 1913 in Ayrshire, Scotland. He was educated at the Edinburgh Academy, where he demonstrated academic excellence and participated in cricket and rugby football. He went on to study medicine at the University of Aberdeen in Aberdeen, Scotland, where he qualified as a physician in 1935. Following his medical qualification, Nicol began his postgraduate career under the mentorship of Professors James Learmonth and Stanley Davidson. When Davidson moved to the University of Edinburgh, Nicol followed him, and the two collaborated on various medical research projects.

== Early career ==
Nicol's early research interests focused on peptic ulcer disease. His clinical work was complemented by a position as a ship's surgeon, where he gained broad medical experience. His first publication on ulcer disease was published in The Lancet in 1939.

During his time working aboard ships, Nicol visited hospitals across India and the Far East, which allowed him to expand his knowledge of medicine and in diverse global contexts.

== Military service ==
In 1936, Nicol joined the 51st Highland Division as a Territorial Officer in the British Royal Corps of Signals. At the outbreak of World War II, he was deployed to France in a non-medical role. However, due to his medical qualifications, he was reassigned to the Royal Army Medical Corps. Nicol's medical expertise was recognized during his service, and he was awarded the Officer of the British Empire (Military Division) for his contributions at the Battle of Arnhem during the war. Upon his promotion to Lieutenant Colonel, he became the youngest person to hold that rank in the Guards Armoured Division.

== Work in Nigeria ==
In 1947, Nicol transferred to the Colonial Medical Service and was stationed in Nigeria, where he spent two decades working as a doctor and nutritionist. As a District Medical Officer in Northern Nigeria, Nicol developed a keen interest in the nutrition of various Nigerian communities. His research focused on the staple foods of different Nigerian ethnic groups, and he published extensively on the subject, including eight journal articles in the British Journal of Nutrition. His work helped to advance the understanding of local diets and their role in public health.

== Contributions to global nutrition ==
After Nigeria gained independence in 1960, Nicol transitioned to an international role with the Food and Agriculture Organization (FAO). His first assignment with the FAO was as a Liaison Officer with UNICEF in New York in the United States. During this time, he made significant contributions to the study of aflatoxins, particularly in relation to groundnut (peanut) production in tropical regions. His research highlighted the link between aflatoxins and liver cancer, a critical issue as groundnut production was a major industry in many developing countries.

In 1962, Nicol moved to FAO Headquarters in Rome, where he served as Deputy Director of the Nutrition Division. He later became acting director during the extended illness of Marcel Autret. Nicol's work at the FAO focused on global nutrition issues, particularly in the context of food security and public health in developing countries.

== Later years, death, and legacy ==
Nicol retired from the FAO in 1973 and settled in Dorset, England. In retirement, he continued to contribute to the field of nutrition through consultancy work in Malaysia and Indonesia. He also remained active in academic circles, serving as a reviewer and member of the editorial board for the Ecology of Food and Nutrition journal for 18 years.

Bruce Milligan Nicol died on November 29, 1987, in Dorset. His research and contributions to global nutrition continue to be recognized for their impact on food science and public health, particularly in the tropics.

== Selected publications ==
- Nicol, B. M. (1952). "The Nutrition of Nigerian Peasants, with Special Reference to the Effects of Deficiencies of the Vitamin B Complex, Vitamin A and Animal Protein". British Journal of Nutrition. 6 (1): 34–55. doi:10.1079/bjn19520004. ISSN 0007-1145. PMID 14935099.
- Nicol, B. M. (1949). "Nutrition of Nigerian Peasant Farmers, with Special Reference to the Effects of Vitamin A and Riboflavin Deficiency". British Journal of Nutrition. 3 (1): 25–43. doi:10.1079/bjn19490006. ISSN 0007-1145. PMID 15392406.
- Nicol, B. M. (1956). "The nutrition of Nigerian children, with particular reference to their energy requirements". British Journal of Nutrition. 10 (3): 181–197. doi:10.1079/bjn19560031. ISSN 0007-1145. PMID 13355930.
- Nicol, B. M. (1959). "The protein requirements of Nigerian peasant farmers". British Journal of Nutrition. 13 (3): 307–320. doi:10.1079/bjn19590041. ISSN 0007-1145. PMID 14426952.
- Nicol, B. M.; Phillips, P. G. (1976). "The Utilization of Dietary Protein by Nigerian Men". British Journal of Nutrition. 36 (3): 337–351. doi:10.1079/bjn19760091. ISSN 0007-1145. PMID 1009067.
- Nicol, B. M. (1956). "The Nutrition of Nigerian Children, with particular reference to their ascorbic-acid requirements". British Journal of Nutrition. 10 (4): 275–285. doi:10.1079/bjn19560043. ISSN 0007-1145. PMID 13374212.
- Nicol, B. M.; Phillips, P. G. (1978). "The utilization of proteins and amino acids in diets based on cassava (Manihot utilissima), rice or sorghum (Sorghum sativa) by young Nigerian men of low income". British Journal of Nutrition. 39 (2): 271–287. doi:10.1079/bjn19780037. ISSN 0007-1145.
- Nicol, B. M. (1959). "The calorie requirements of Nigerian peasant farmers". British Journal of Nutrition. 13 (3): 293–306. doi:10.1079/bjn19590040. ISSN 0007-1145. PMID 14426951.
- Nicol, Bruce M. (1953). "Tribal Nutrition and Health in Nigeria". The American Journal of Clinical Nutrition. 1 (5): 364–371. doi:10.1093/ajcn/1.5.364. ISSN 0002-9165. PMID 13096575.
- Nicol, B. M. (1959). "Fertility and food in Northern Nigeria". West African Medical Journal. 8 (1): 18–27. PMID 13636158.
- Nicol, B. M. (1953). "Protein in the Diet of the Isoko Tribe of the Niger Delta". Proceedings of the Nutrition Society. 12 (1): 66–69. doi:10.1079/pns19530015. ISSN 0029-6651.
- Nicol, B. M. (1974), "Reasons for, and Methods in Dietary and Food Consumption Surveys", Assessment of Nutritional Status and Food Consumption Surveys, Forum of Nutrition, vol. 20, S. Karger AG, pp. 69–76, doi:10.1159/000395370, ISBN 978-3-8055-1685-3, PMID 4215416
- Mann, G. V.; Nicol, B. M.; Stare, F. J. (1955-10-22). "Beta-Lipoprotein and Cholesterol Concentrations in Sera of Nigerians". British Medical Journal. 2 (4946): 1008–1010. doi:10.1136/bmj.2.4946.1008. ISSN 0959-8138. PMC 1981153. PMID 13260648.
- Nicol, Bruce M (1991). Wind of Chance. Edinburgh: Pentland Press. ISBN 0946270988.
- Passmore, R.; Nicol, Bruce Milligan; Rao, M. Narayana (1974). Handbook on Human Nutritional Requirements. Food & Agriculture Org. ISBN 978-92-5-100129-5.
- Nicol, B. M. (1974). Food and Nutrition in the Agricultural Development Plan for Indonesia. Jakarta: FAO Planning Team.

== See also ==
- British Journal of Nutrition
- Food and Agriculture Organization
- British Royal Corps of Signals
