= Jenny Lindsay =

Scottish poet and activist (born 1982)

- Born: Maybole, Ayrshire, Scotland
- Occupation: Poet
- Writing career
- Language: Scots; English
- Years active: 2002 -
- Notable works: The Things You Leave Behind, This Script
- Notable awards: Creative Edinburgh Award for Leadership, John Byrne Award for Critical Thinking
- Website: www.jennylindsay.com

Jenny Lindsay is a Scottish poet, performer, and promoter.

== Career ==
Lindsay started writing poetry in 2002 at the age of 20. Her first full poetry collection to be published was "The Things You Leave Behind," which Red Squirrel Press published in 2011. She was BBC Slam Champion in 2012. Following this debut, she released pamphlet-length collections, "The Eejit Pit" in 2012 and "Ire & Salt" in 2015.

Lindsay worked as a modern studies schoolteacher in Edinburgh until 2014, when she became a full time writer, mentor, and events organiser.

In 2016, Lindsay established her own company, "Flint & Pitch", which curates and hosts events that combine music and poetry, showcasing them at prominent venues like the Royal Lyceum Theatre.

In 2017 Lindsay was awarded the Creative Edinburgh Award for Leadership for her work in the spoken word sector and longlisted for the inaugural Jerwood Compton Poetry Fellowship.

Lindsay published her second full poetry collection, "This Script," by Stewed Rhubarb Press in 2019. "This Script" is also a play that was performed the same year and was described as "inspiring and thought provoking" in reviews.

In 2020, Lindsay won the John Byrne Award for Critical Thinking for her film-poem ‘The Imagined We’.

== Works ==
=== Poetry collections ===
- The Things You Leave Behind (Red Squirrel Press, 2011); ISBN 978-1906700386
- This Script (Stewed Rhubarb Press, 2019) ISBN 978-1910416075
- This Script (re-release) (Red Squirrel Press, 2022) ISBN 978-1913632328

=== Poetry pamphlets ===
- The Eejit Pit (Stewed Rhubarb Press, 2012) ISBN 978-0957636316
- Ire & Salt (Stewed Rhubarb Press, 2015)

=== Non-fiction ===
- Hounded (Polity Press, 2024) ISBN 978-1509563630

== Personal life ==
Jenny Lindsay is from Ayrshire. She lived in Edinburgh, having moved there for university at 17, before returning to Ayrshire in 2020. Lindsay is a supporter of the Scottish independence movement and has campaigned for independence.

Lindsay has spoken publicly about her experiences of being stalked as well as being a survivor of sexual assault.
