= Potato Labour Scandal 1971 =

Scottish political scandal

The Potato Labour Scandal of 1971 was a scandal that was exposed through investigative journalism initiated on concerns raised by Irish Catholic Priests in Scotland. It raised the concern of forced labour by Irish Labour Suppliers of Irish workers, particularly from the West of Ireland to the Scottish Lowlands.

The Welsh journalist Tom Davies wrote about the conditions, singling out five Nevin brothers from Achill, County Mayo, Ireland. Fr. Michael Cassidy was a main witness in the treatment of workers. The News of the World exposed the story on 18 July 1971 after journalist Gerry Brown posed as a worker in one of the Nevin brothers work gangs. Tim Pat Coogan referred to the Labour Suppliers as "Mafia" in his book Wherever Green Is Worn: The Story of the Irish Diaspora. It led to reform in legislation protecting the rights of seasonal "potato pickers" or "tattie hoakers".
