= Longbar =

Coordinates: 55.73885°N 4.66481°W

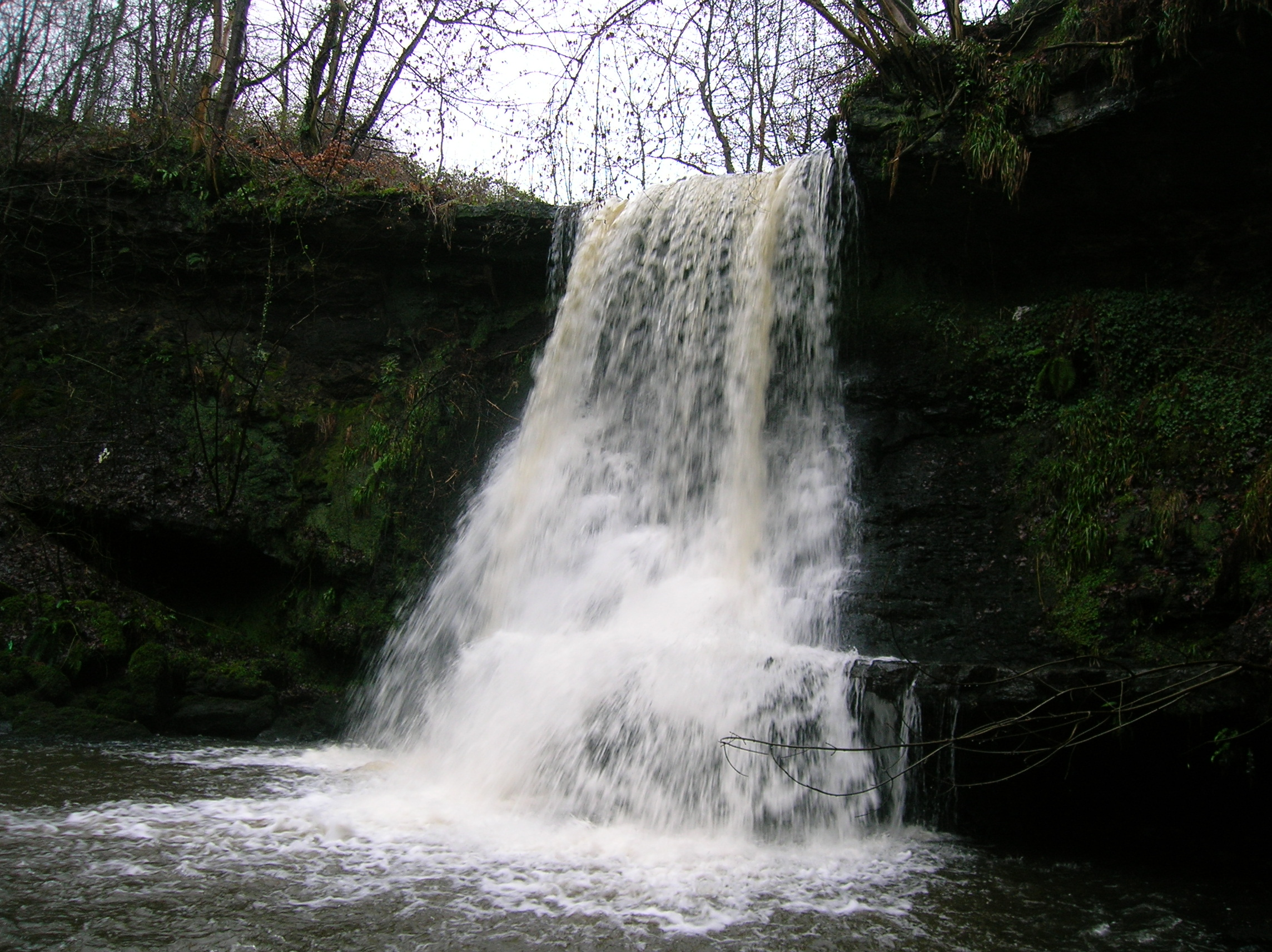
The Linn Spout or Tianna Falls near Longbar.

Longbar is a hamlet in North Ayrshire, Scotland, immediately to the east of Glengarnock.

== History ==
Longbar is now a housing estate situated on the low hillside above the Longbar Farm. Originally it was a string of single-storey terraced cottages (rows) that ran from the farm east towards the junction of the Auchengree Road with the B777 road. Both versions of the hamlet have provided housing for workers in the local heavy industries, primarily the Glengarnock Steel Works.

When the steel works closed in the early 1980s the inhabitants of the community found themselves largely unemployed and the housing estate became notorious for its social problems. Since then much of it has been purchased by its inhabitants.

The community shares a community hall with the neighbouring hamlet of Auchengree, or Meikle Auchengree.

== See also ==
- The Barony of Kersland
- Meikle Auchengree
