= Hessilhead hamlet =

Coordinates: 55.7426°N 4.5775°W

Hessilhead hamlet: Haselet
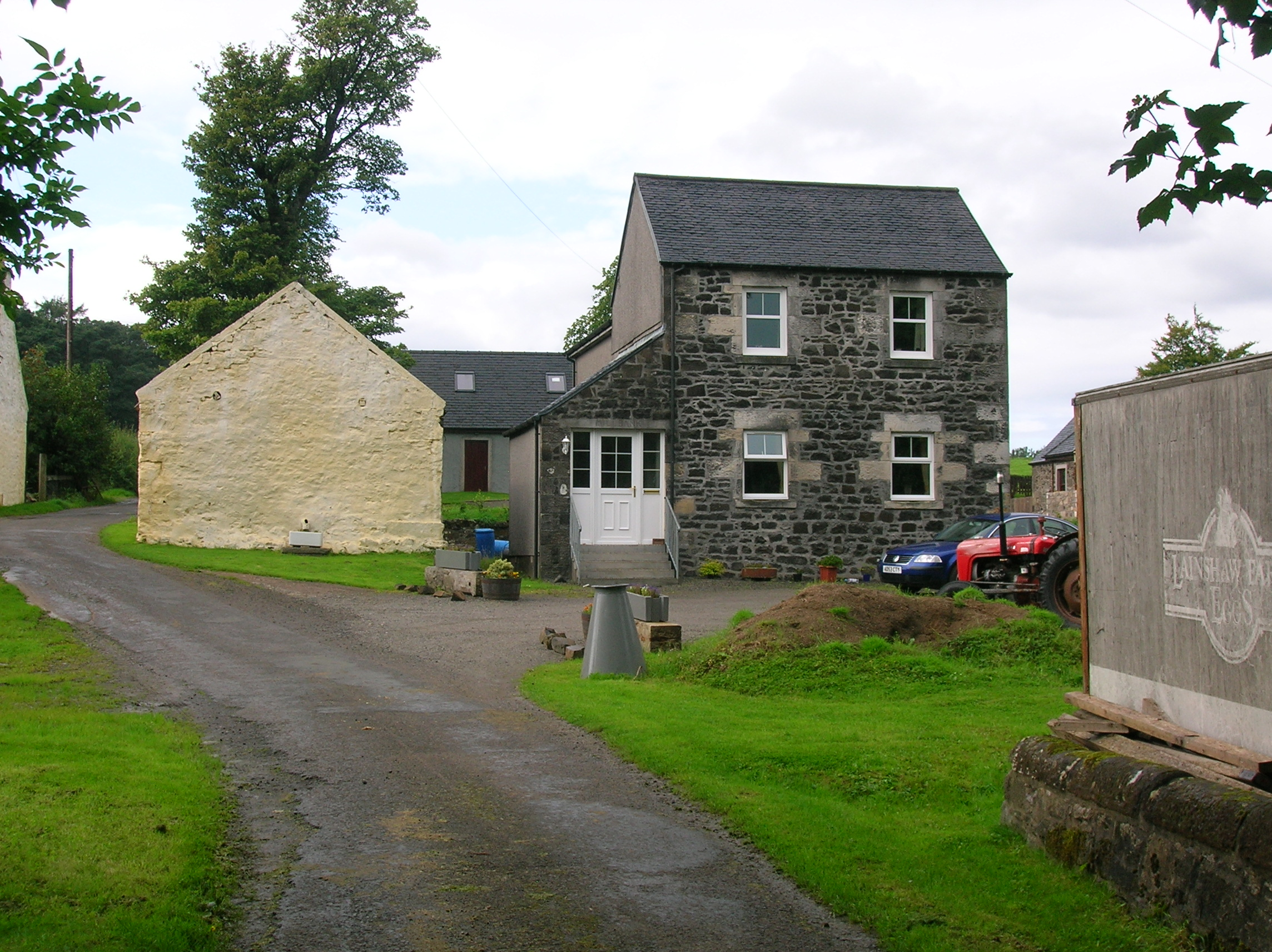
- The old Haselet School building

- Location within North Ayrshire
- OS grid reference: NS2365
- Council area: North Ayrshire
- Lieutenancy area: Ayrshire and Arran
- Country: Scotland
- Sovereign state: United Kingdom
- Police: Scotland
- Fire: Scottish
- Ambulance: Scottish
- UK Parliament: Central Ayrshire
- Scottish Parliament: Cunninghame South

Hessilhead hamlet or Haselet is a small settlement or clachan in North Ayrshire, Scotland. It is situated to the east of the town of Beith and stands on the course of the Dusk Water that once drove the local mill. Hazlehead or Hasslehead are also previously used names for the estate that the hamlet was originally a part of.

== History ==
The 1858 OS map shows a small settlement with a school, a dwelling called Damback, a sawmill and a corn mill combined with a mill pond and dam with a sluice upstream. The hamlet may have once been known at Nethertoun and locally it is known as 'Haselet', probably derived from 'Hessilhead Hamlet'. It is said to have originally been the dwelling of the retainers of the lairds at Hessilhead Castle and to stretch a point such settlements often arose at the site where the workers who built the castle encamped.

=== School ===
The hamlet's small school had closed by 1897. The school had originally been single-storied and thatched; however, a second storey was added in 1844 with substantial outside steps and it was slated at that time.

Matthew Pollock, who established Beith's Caledonia Cabinet Works in the town and at the Bark Mill, was educated there and after the school's closure he obtained the bell for use at his works in Beith to signal the start and end of the day. Howie's of Dunlop, the owners of the estate at the time, obtained the bell in the 1930s to Dunlop. It is now located at North Netherhouses, near old Templehouse, Dunlop.

=== Farm Town ===
The Haselet or Hessilhead 'Farm Town' hamlet still exists, dating from at least the 1740s judging by William Roy's map as previously noted. The site, although undergoing rapid change, appears to be a rare survival of a typical 18th-century 'Ferm Toun'. Porterfield in his booklet titled "Rambles Round Beith" relates that the name of this clachan was 'Haselet' from 'Hasslehead Hamlet' (sic), previously 'Nethertown'. In 1832, John Thomson's map of Ayrshire shows the hamlet in much the same layout as it exists today.

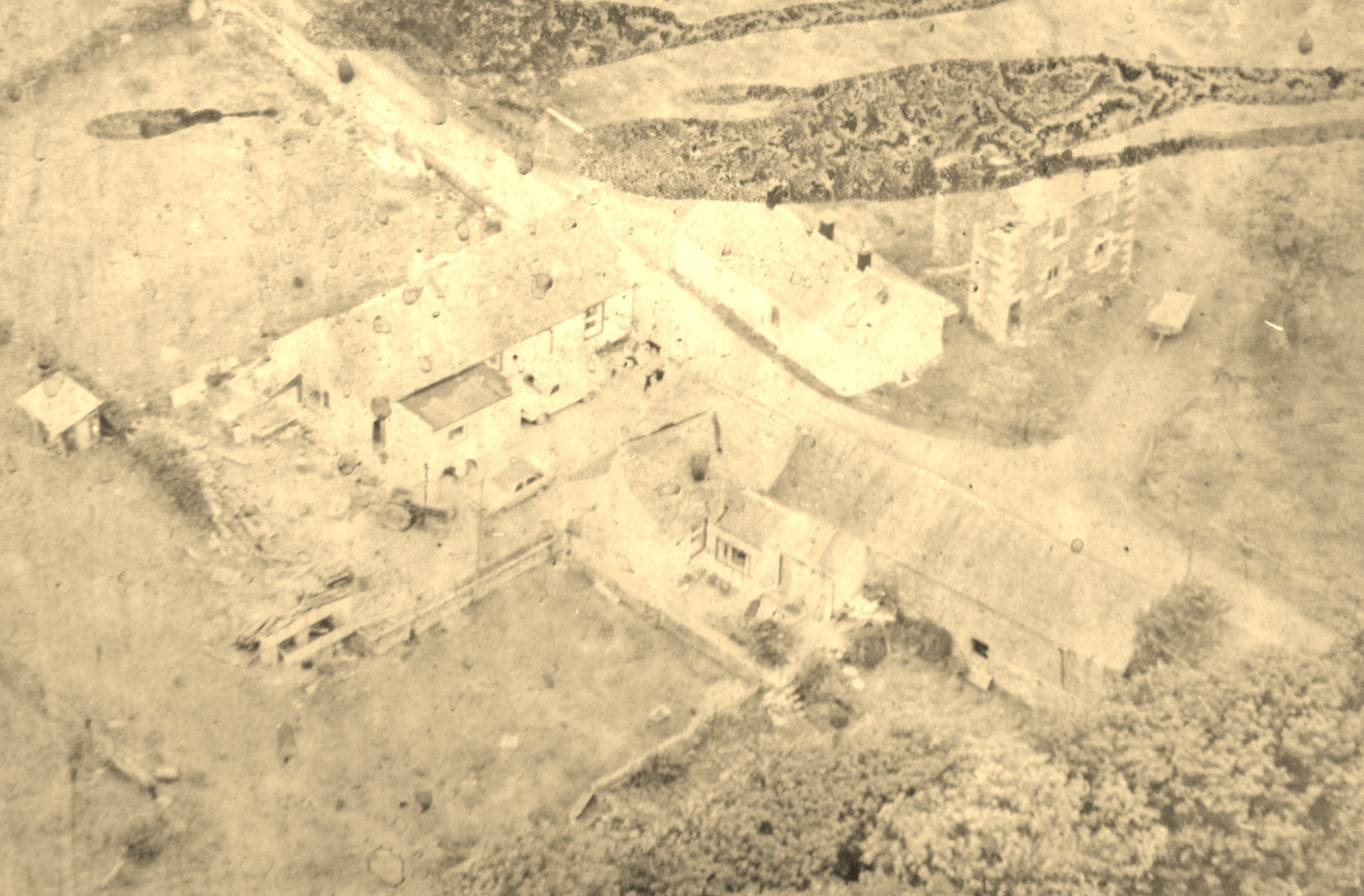
An aerial view showing the mill

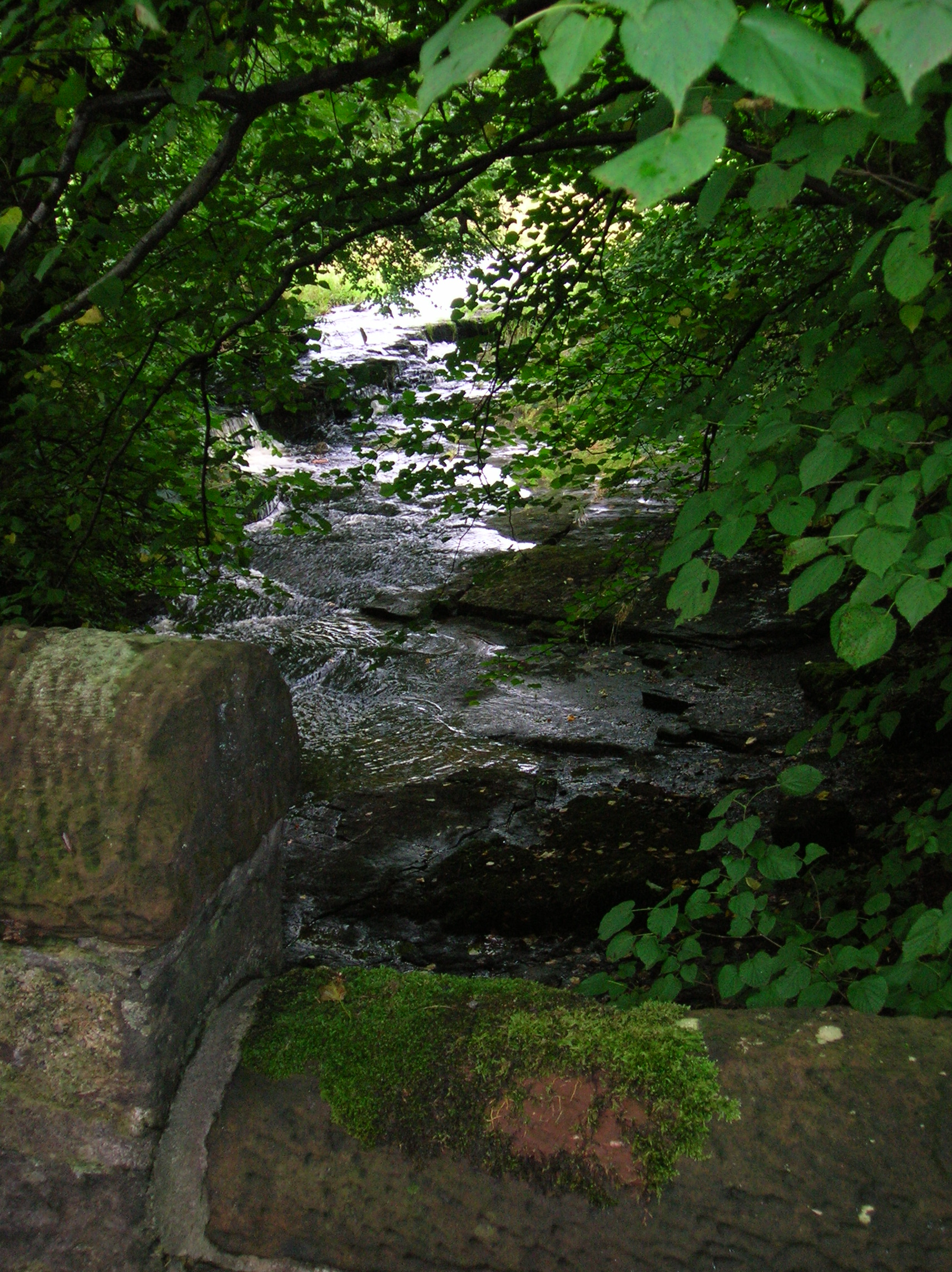
The Dusk Water running after the junction to the old mill race which took the water to the saw mill.

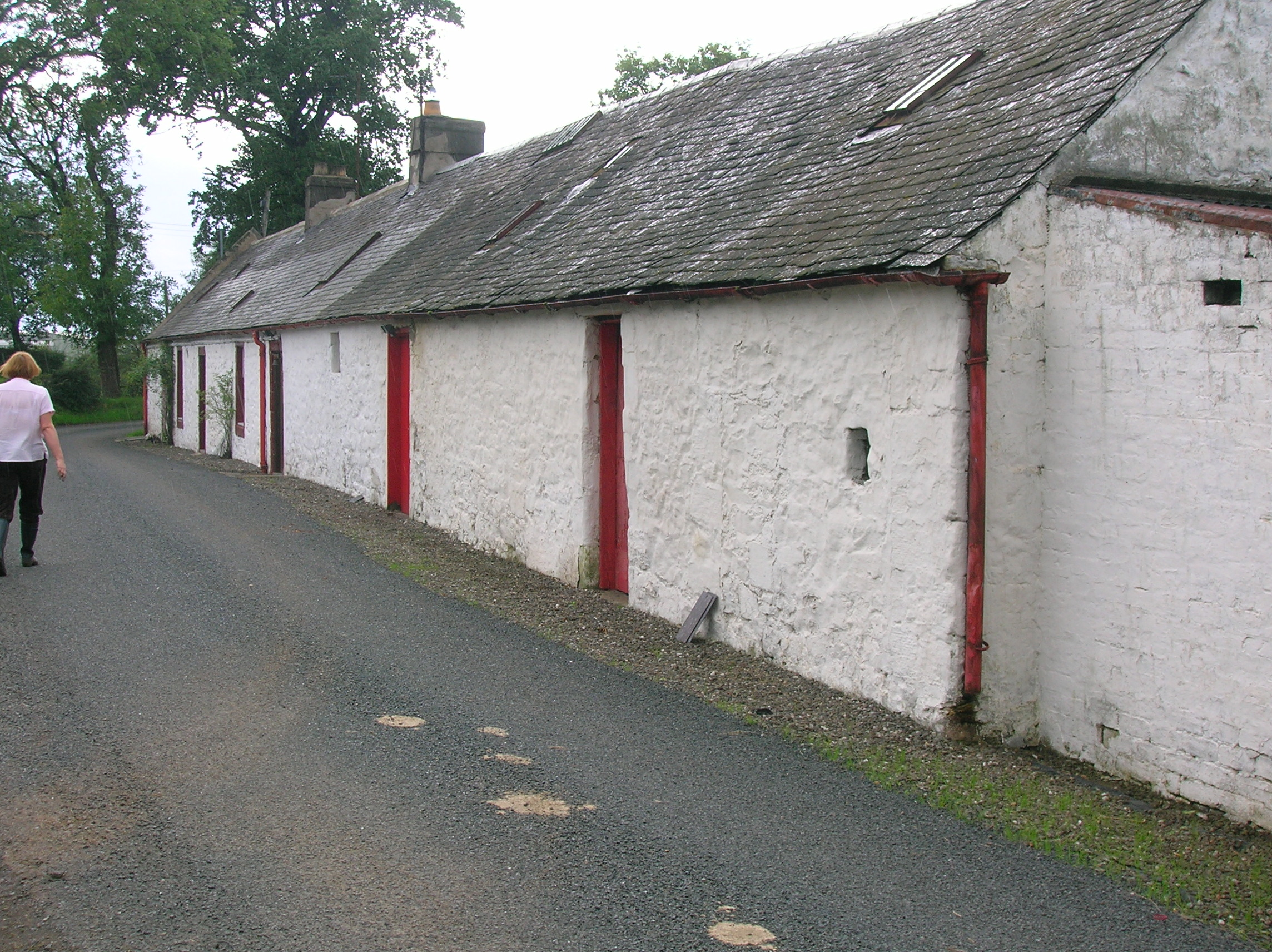
The Old Hessilhead Town Farm looking towards Tandleview.

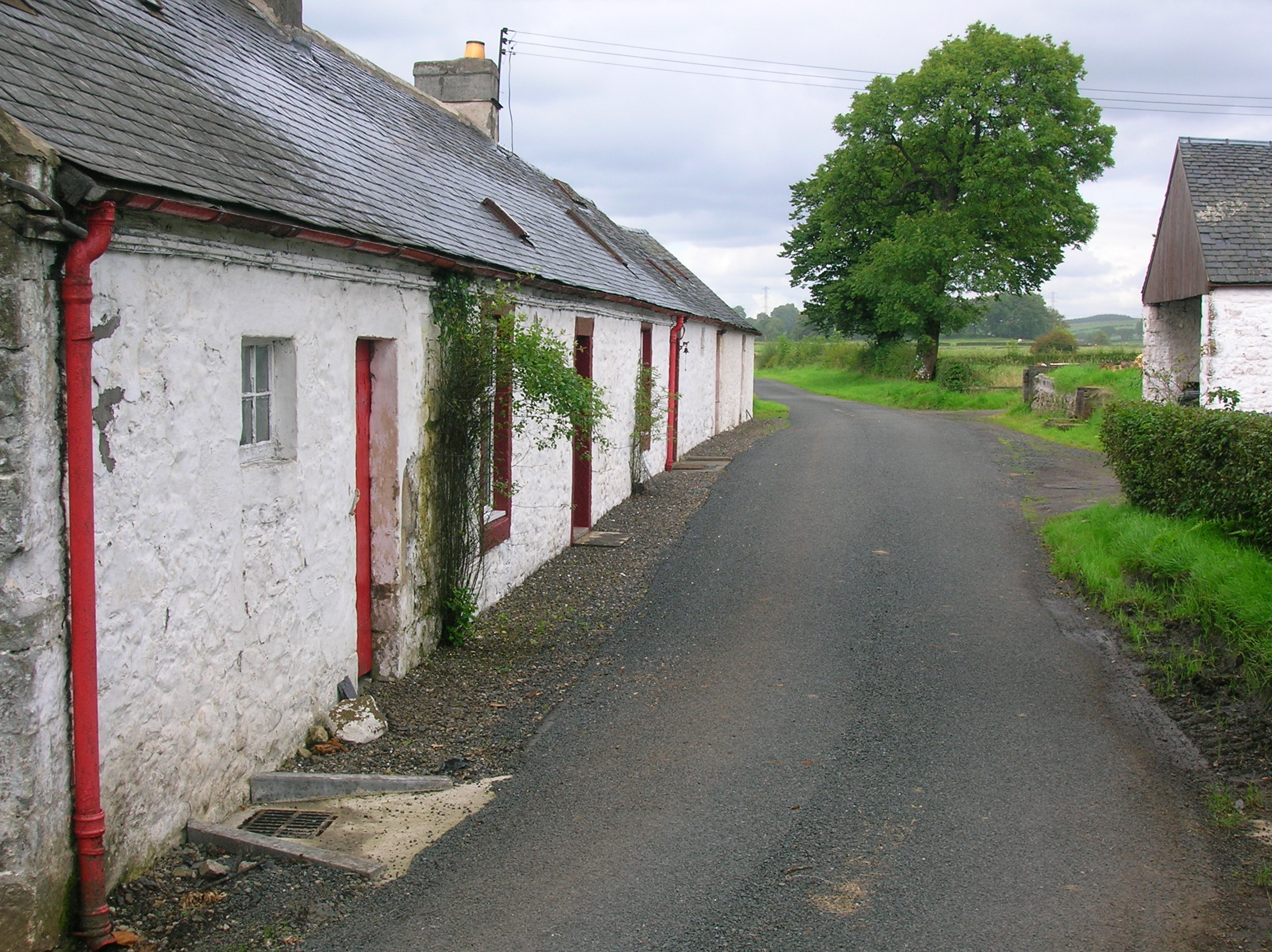
Old Hessilhead Town Farm looking towards Over Hessilhead and Blaelochhead.
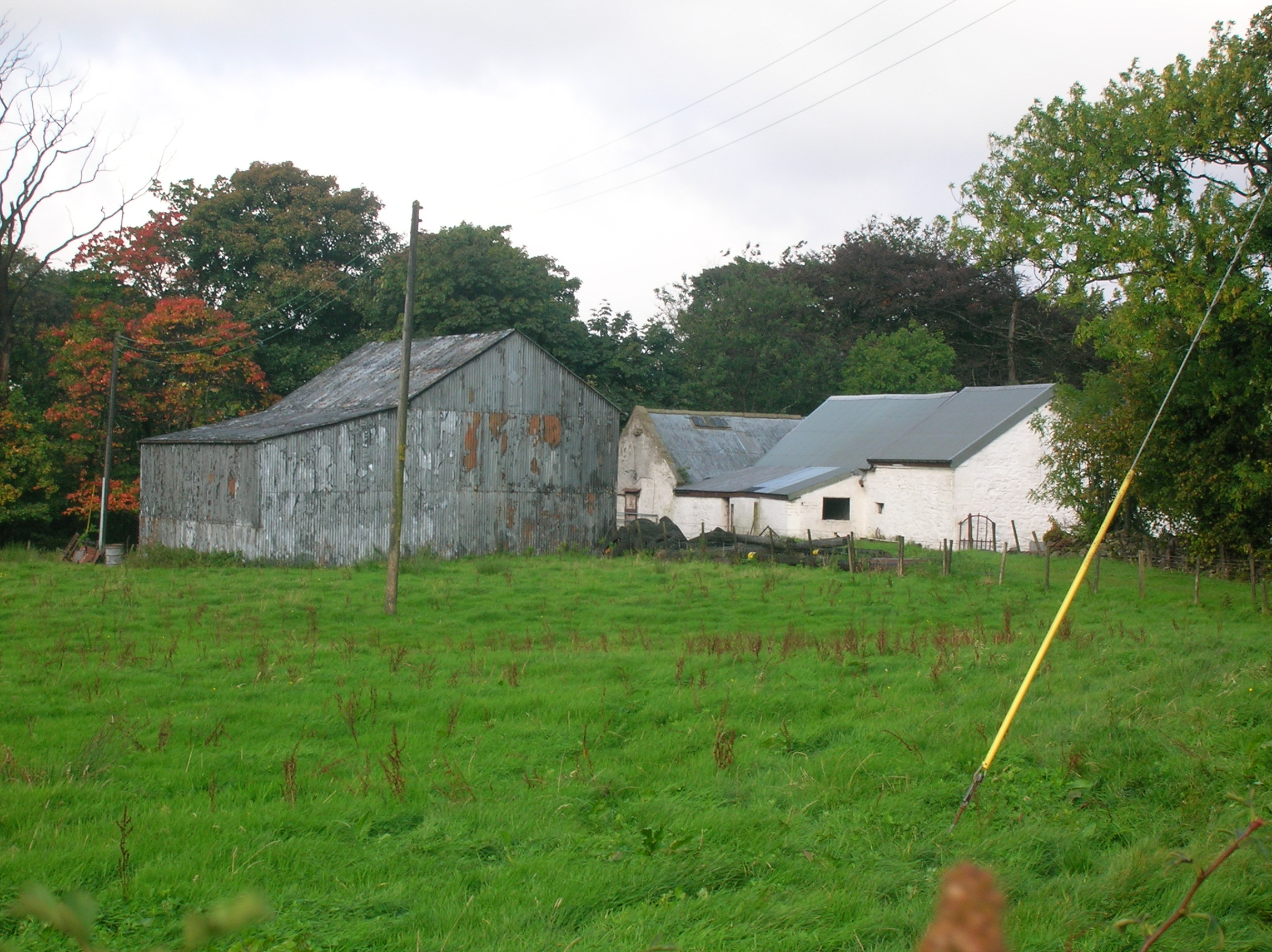
Hessilhead Farm.

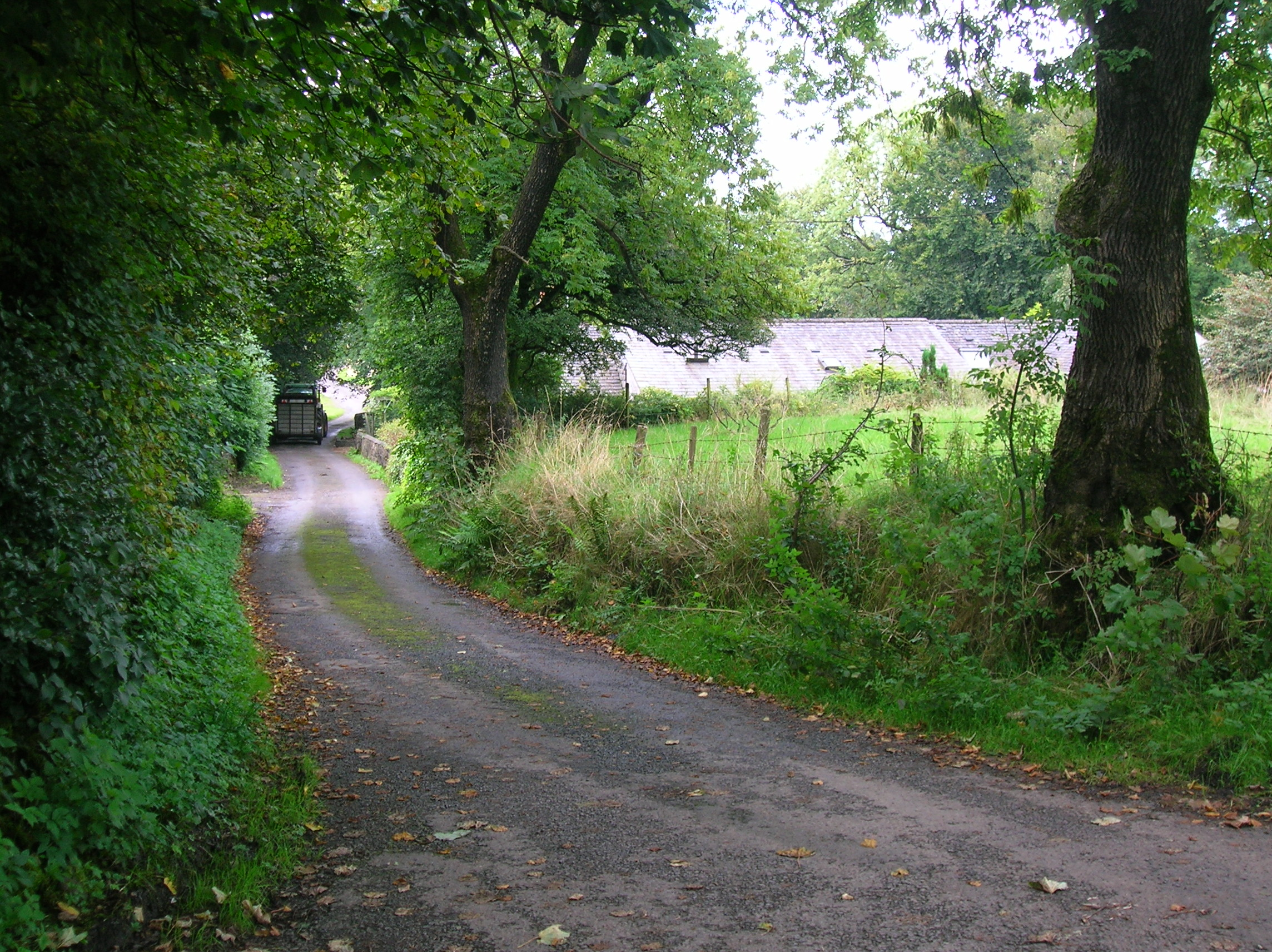
The lane down to the old school.

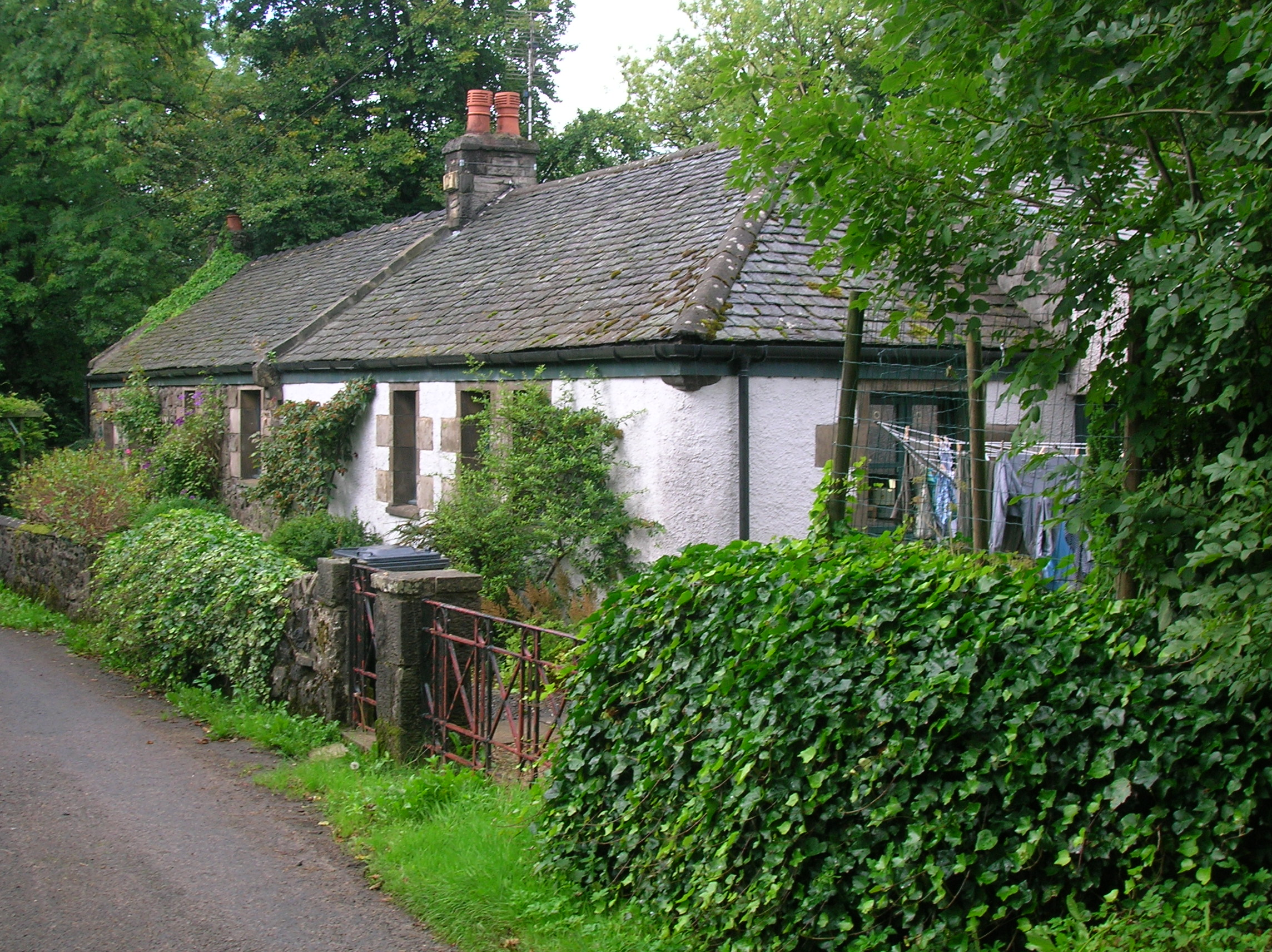
Duskwater Cottage.

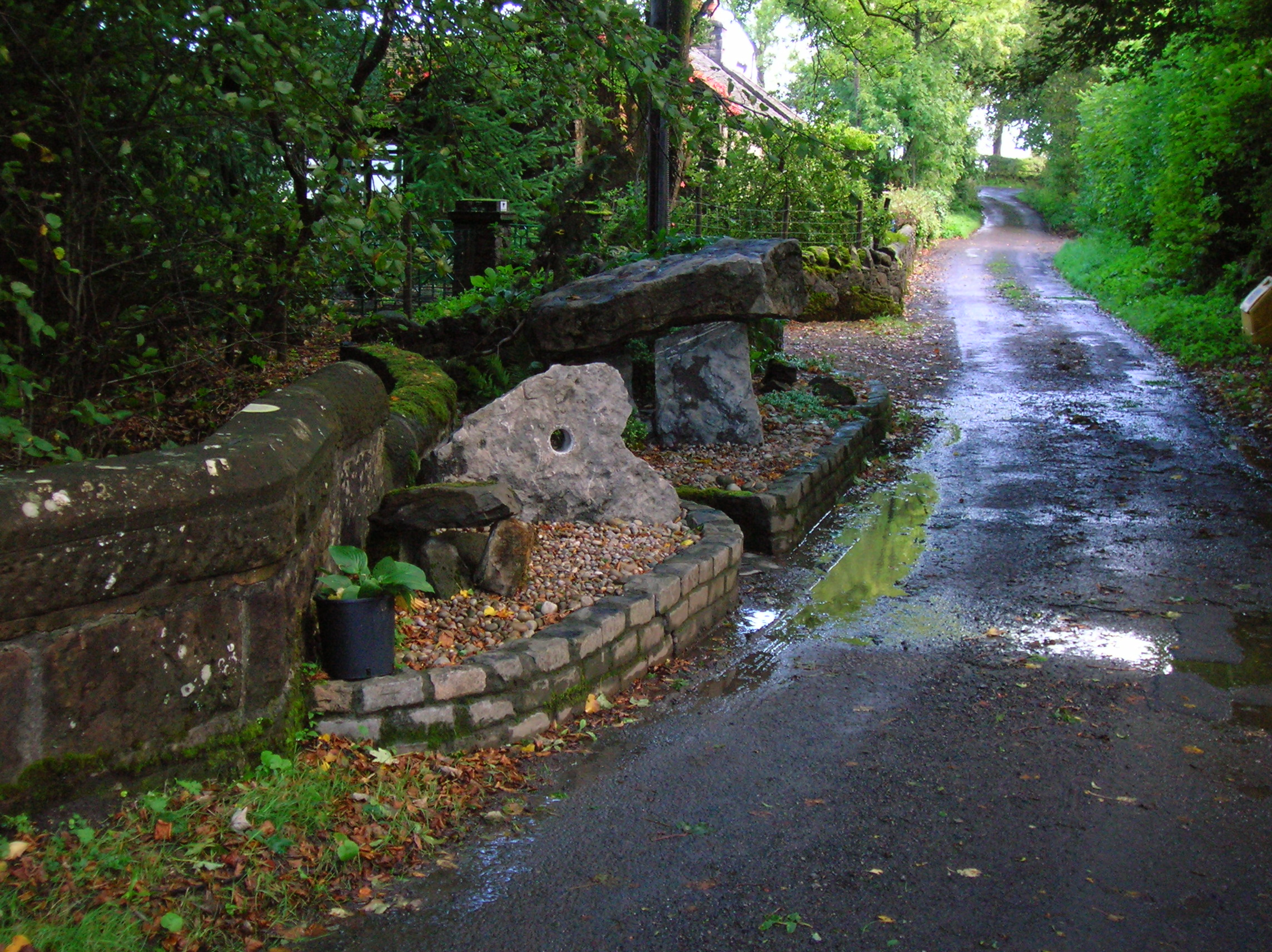
Megaliths outside Duskwater Cottage.

The origin of 'Farm Towns' lies in the common medieval sub-division of land called a ploughgate (104 acres), the extent of land which one plough team of oxen could till in a year. This area was again subdivided into four husbandlands, each of 26 acres (110,000 m^{2}). Each husbandland could provide two oxen and eight oxen were needed for a plough-team. This arrangement led to small farm towns like Haselet being established with accommodation for at least four men in six to eight houses, taking practical considerations into account. A similar 'ferm toun' existed at Bloak, near Auchentiber, until the 1890s.

Duskwater Cottage was the blacksmith's and a cobbler also worked there. A fine example of an old well survives, thirty feet deep with a sandstone slab cover, pierced with a hole that once held the hand pump.

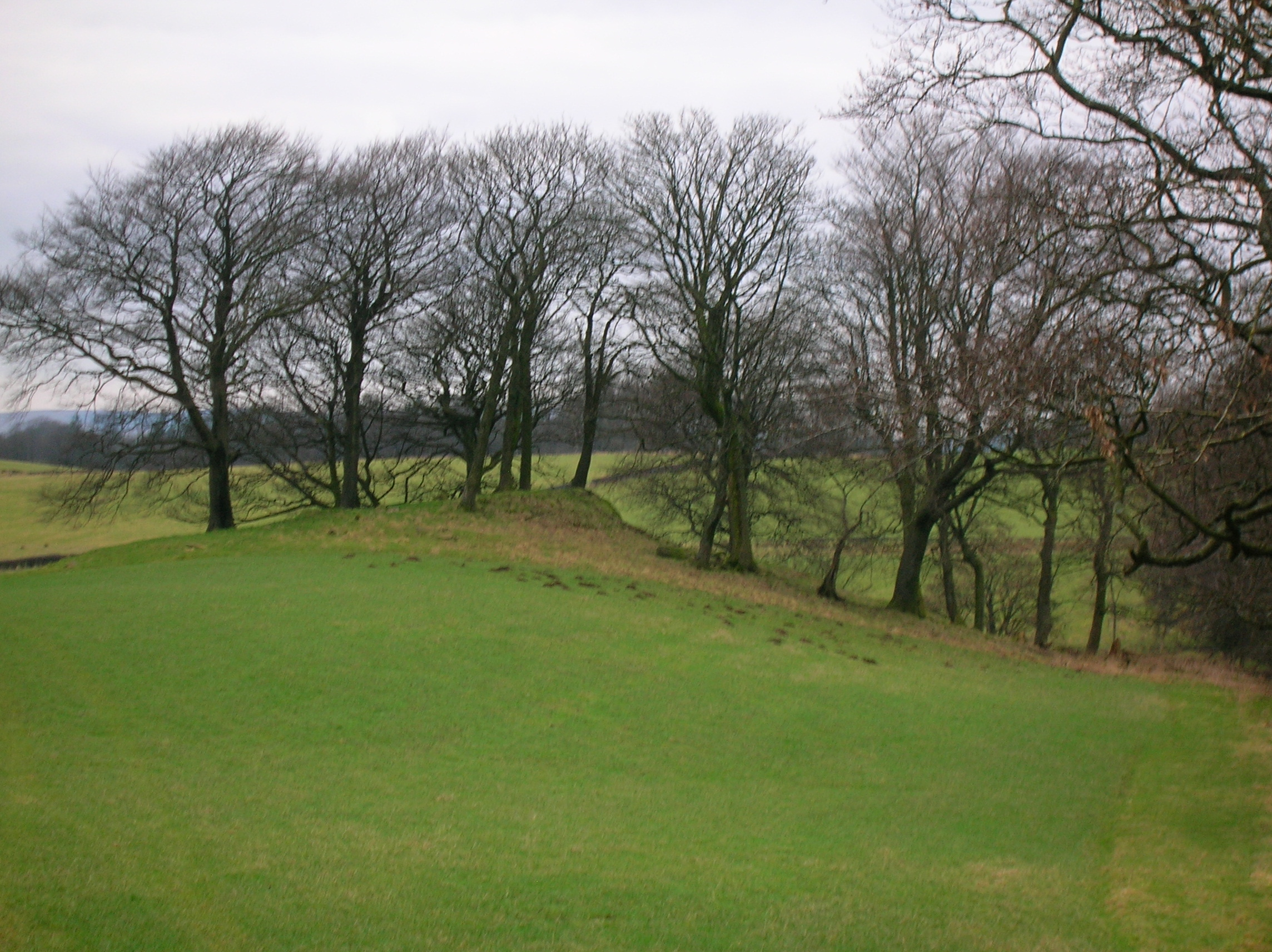
Hessilhead knowe below Blaelochhead.

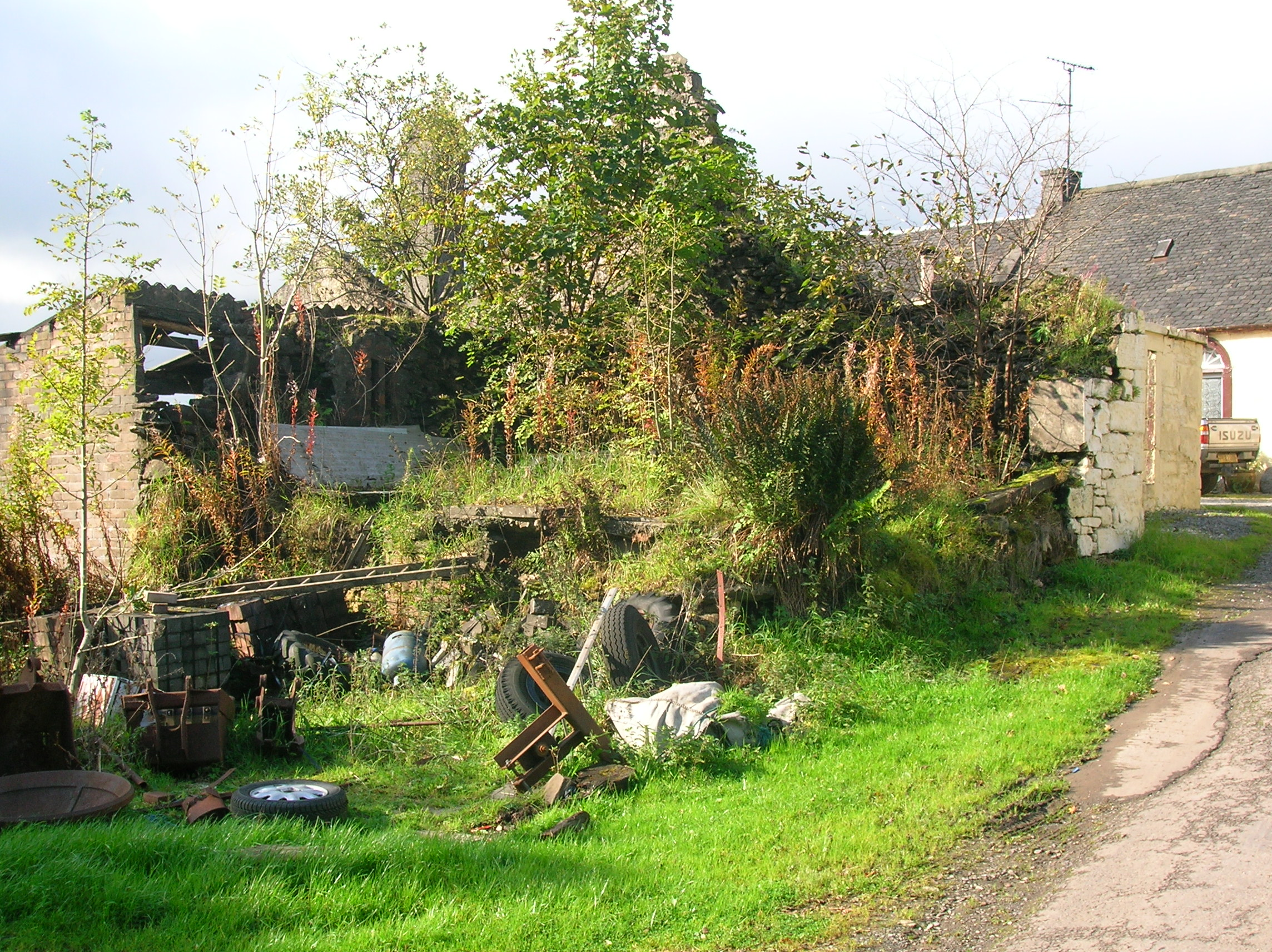
The Hessilhead Saw Mill ruins.

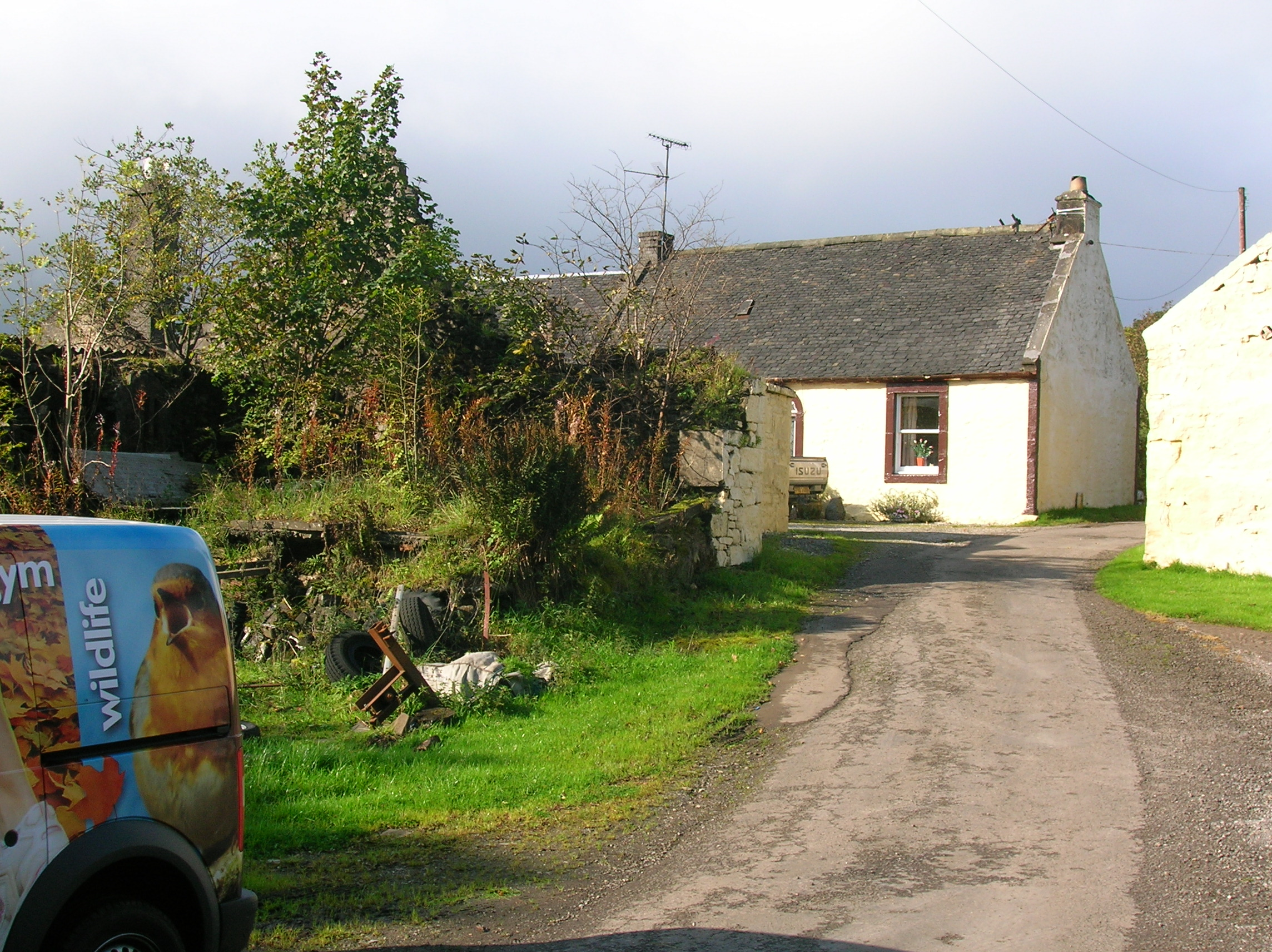
Hazlehead, the miller's house.

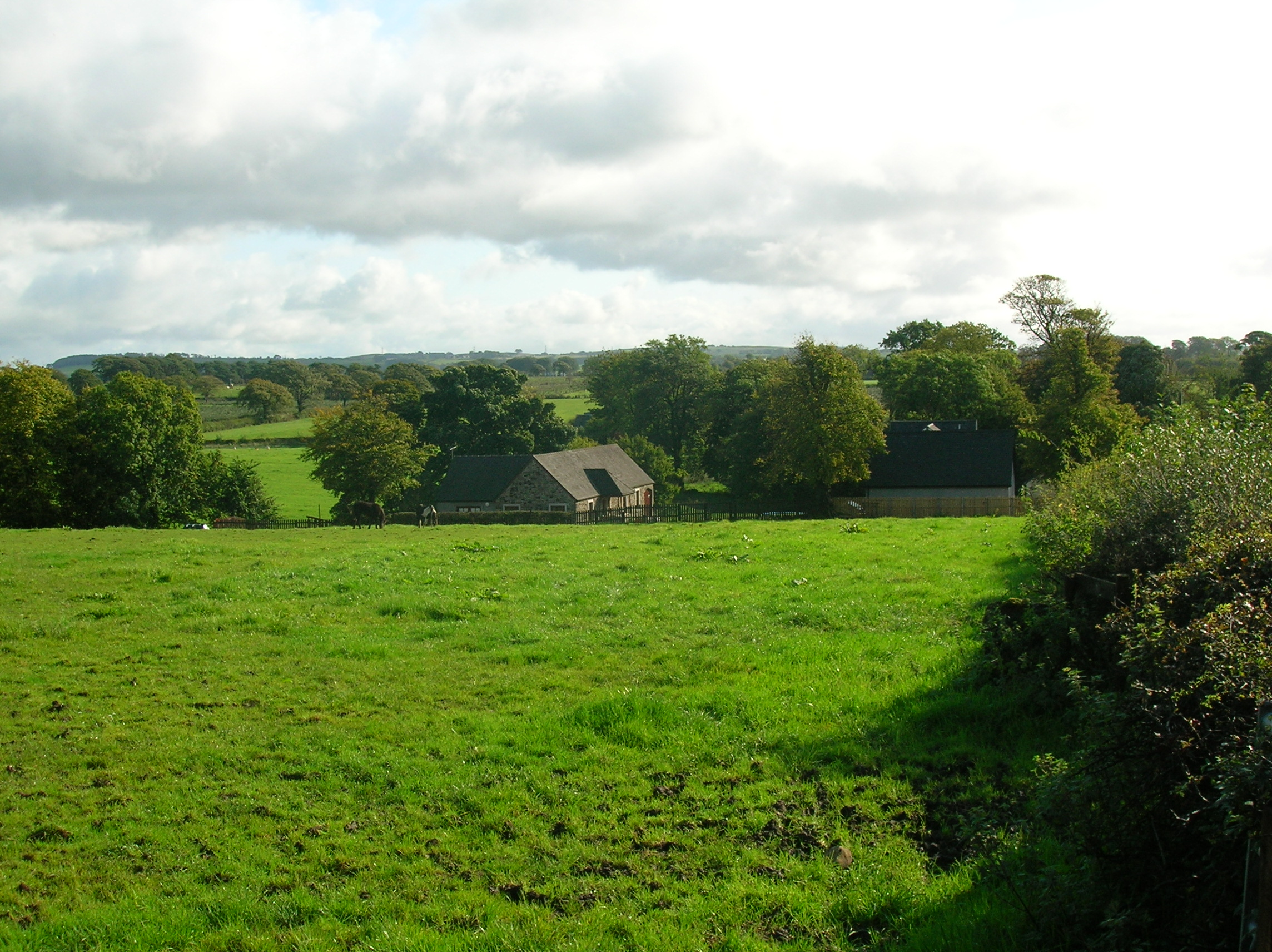
Hessilhead looking across to Damback.

=== Hessilhead Mill ===
Hessilhead Mill has been demolished; however, the circular grain kiln remnants survive, attached to the ruins of the miller's house. The course of the lade running from the Dusk Water is discernable and the watergate or sluice is apparent. Steps once led down to the waterwheel, which was not removed but was buried in situ. In 1897 the mill dam is no longer marked on the OS maps and the mill is recorded solely as a saw mill.

Water pump

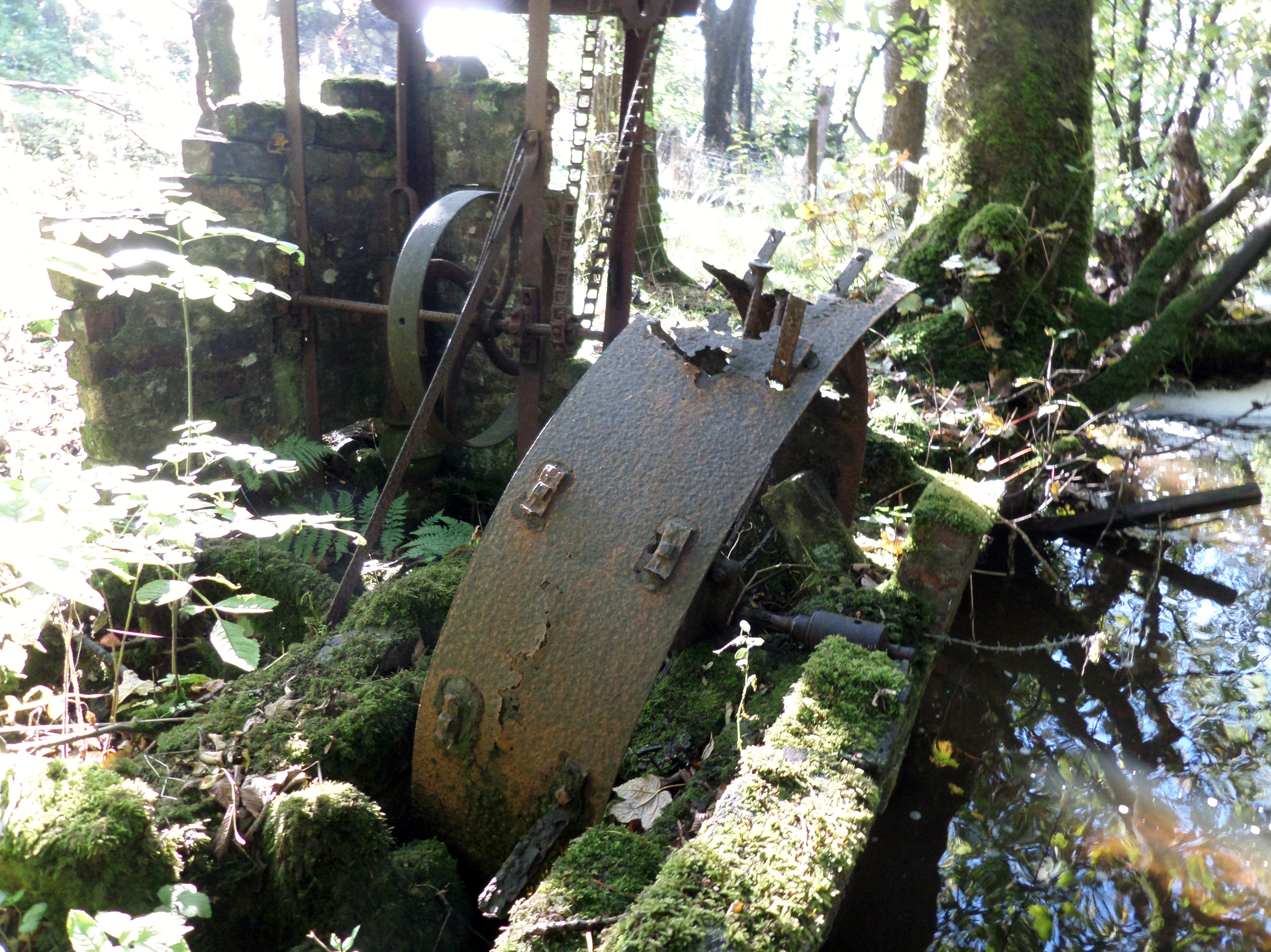
The old water powered water pump on the Dusk Water.

A largely intact example of a 'Victorian' era water pump survives next to the Dusk water within the clachan. This pump was powered via a small waterwheel, and a sluice and weir arrangement once directed water to it. Drinking water did not originate from water courses due to the risk of pollution by stock, etc. and it is not clear what the water from the burn was used for other than providing water for the cattle in the farm sheds.

== Micro-history ==
A cromlech, standing stone and holed stone have been erected on the road verge near Duskwater Cottage. This cottage is shown as a ruin as far back as 1856 however by 1897 a roofed cottage is again shown.

== See also ==
- Hessilhead
