= Meikle Auchengree =

Coordinates: 55.73411°N 4.67083°W

Meikle Auchengree is a hamlet near Kilbirnie and Longbar in North Ayrshire, Scotland.

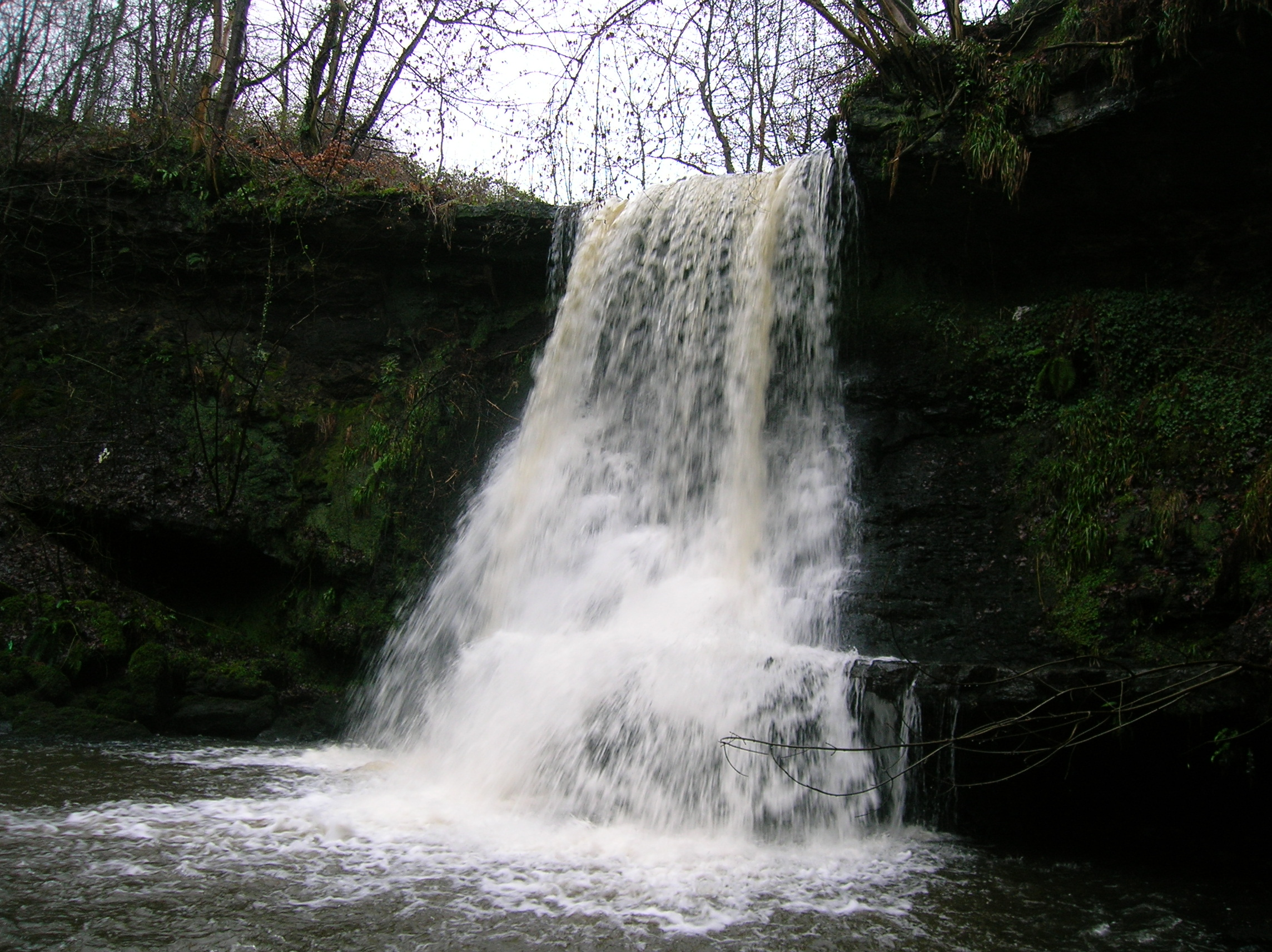
The Linn Spout or Tianna Falls.

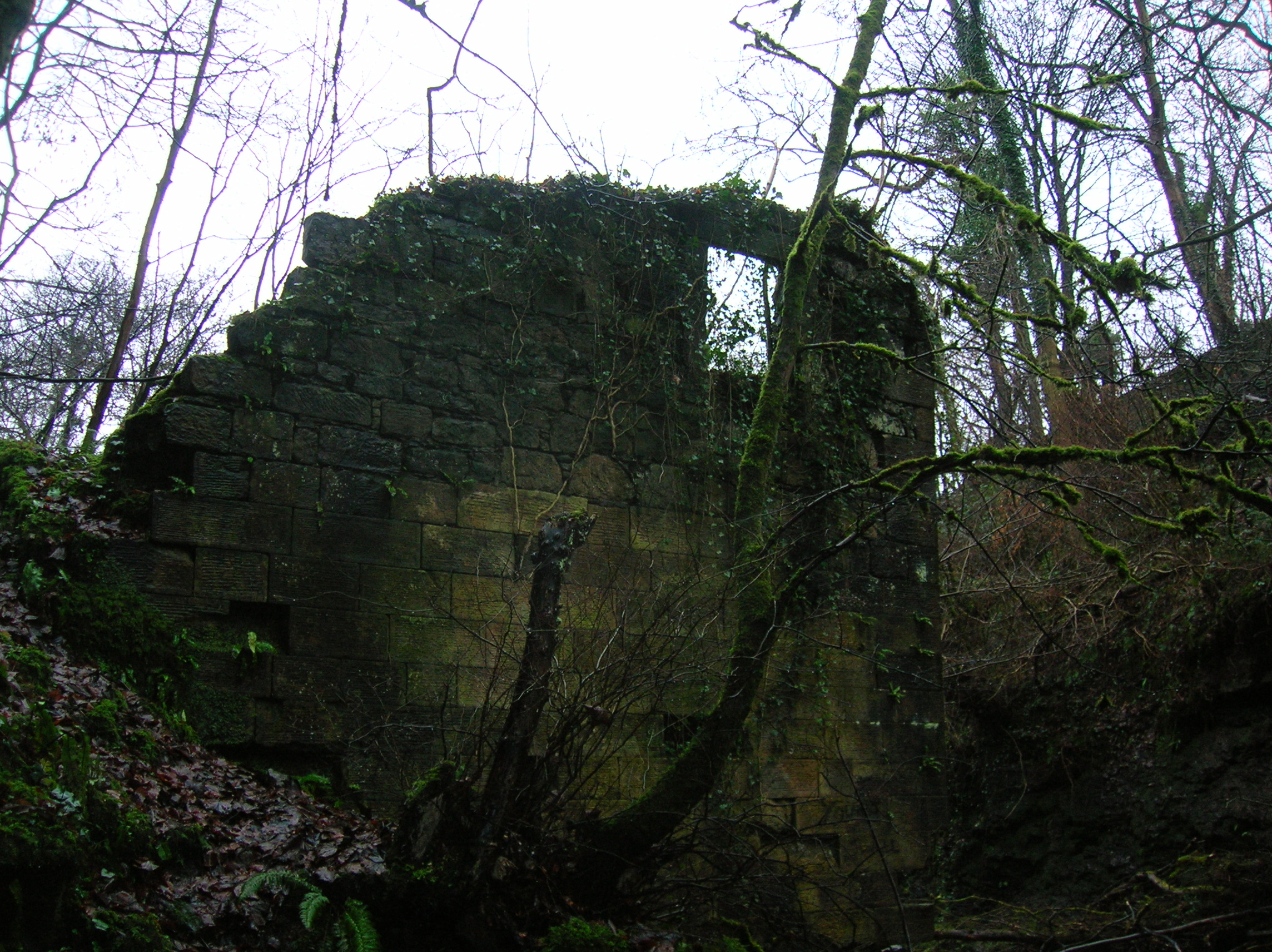
Kersland Mill ruins.

== History ==
Meikle Auchengree is 500 metres (2 1/2 furlongs) east of Glengarnock in Dalry parish. The hamlet is situated at the north end of the Auchengree Road which runs between the B777 and the A737 roads. The settlement is today a mixture of farms, small-holdings and residential properties. Its most distinctive building is that of the former Auchengree Engine Works, a mid Victorian factory building on the eastern side of the Auchengree Road. The Auchengree Farm has a farm shop selling local produce, the only shop in the hamlet. A community hall is shared with the neighbouring hamlet of Longbar situated near the junction with the B777, at the Auchengree Bridge. The Auchengree Bridge is a simple stone arch that crosses the Powgree Burn. On the opposite bank of the burn from the hall stood the Auchengree Foundry; one of the earliest in an area once famous for its iron and steel making. The foundry once exploited the ironstones that were easily quarried from the banks of the Powgree Burn.

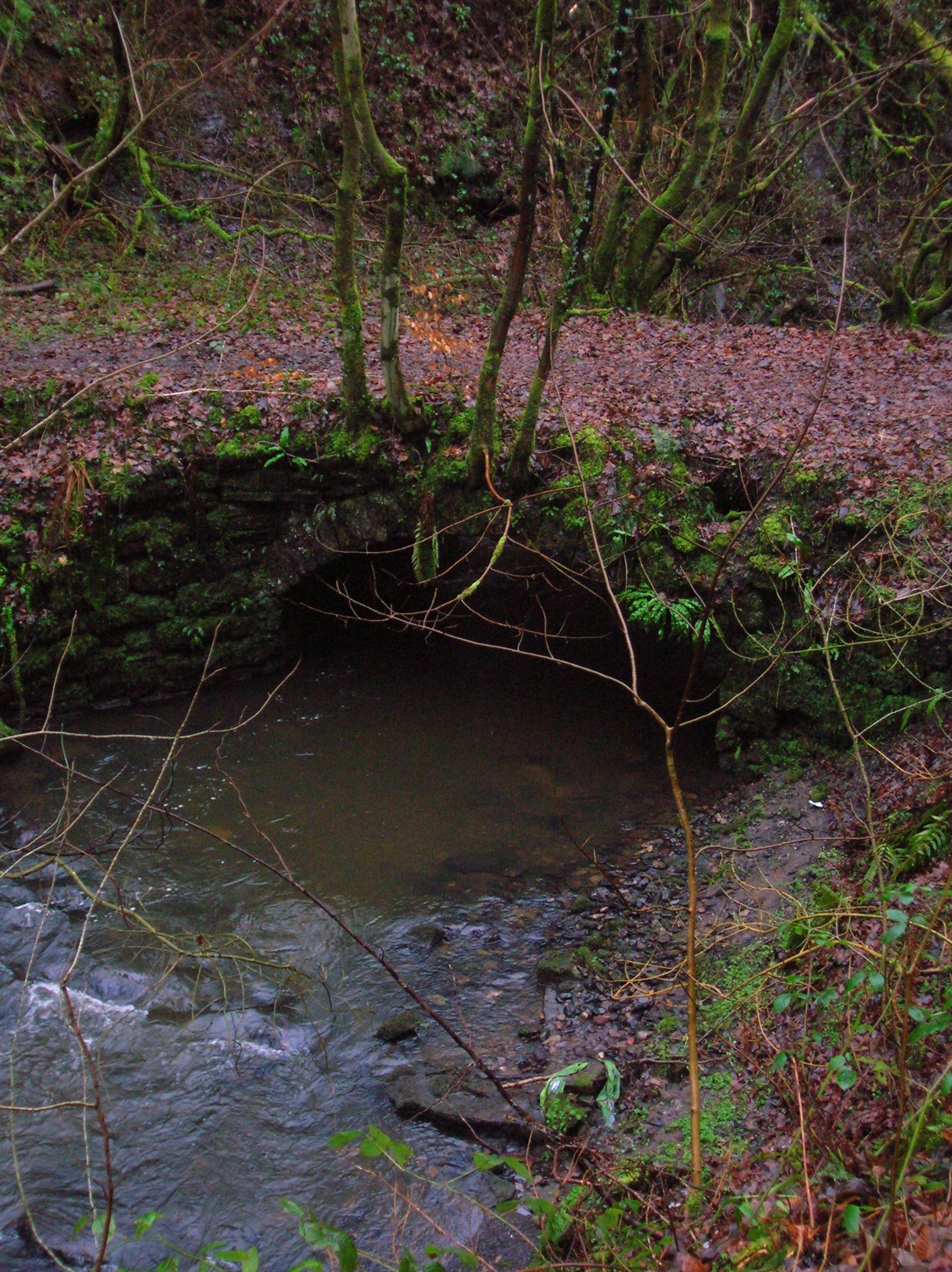
The bridge over the Powgree at Kersland Mill.

=== Industry ===
The works and the foundry were not the only industries that Auchengree once hosted. The remains of two mills can be found if the Powgree Burn is followed upstream from Auchengree Bridge into Kersland Glen. The downstream of the two, Braehead Mill was once a saw mill that continued working until at least 1912. Further upstream at Braehead Falls, Tianna Falls or Linn Spout (the name of the waterfall varies by which source is consulted) there is another, better known, Linn or Lynn Spout on the Caaf Water, again in Dalry Parish) are the ruins of the Kersland Lint Mill, one of many small mills for flax processing that existed briefly in the nineteenth century. Just below the falls is a third old flour mill's ruins and the Kersland Farm lies above, once the miller's dwelling and owned at one time by the Spier family of Marshalland.

The old OS maps show that a dam existed above the falls and a leat or lade carried water from the millpond to the waterwheel on the Kersland Mill, located on the gable end facing the falls. The lower lint and saw mills were supplied with a head of water from a millpond created by a dam at the lower end of the glen and this explains the degree of erosion of the southern bank of the Powgree Burn below Kersland Mill Bridge.

=== Longbar ===
Clustered on the open area west of the Auchengree Road between the B777 and the Powgree Burn were the rows of the original Longbar hamlet, which ran from there towards the Longbar farm along the line of the B777. With their demolition and the creation of the housing estate now known as Longbar a division between what is Longbar and what is Auchengree was created.

== See also ==
- The Barony of Kersland
- Swindridgemuir House and estate
- Longbar
