= Craigmalloch =

- Location within East Ayrshire
- 55.225°N 4.387°W
- Location: Straiton, East Ayrshire, Scotland; UK grid reference NX48149471

History
- Built: unknown

Craigmalloch is a historic site in East Ayrshire, Scotland, which consists of a large enclosure that is approximately elliptical in shape, encircling a possible second circular enclosure. It is located at NX48149471 in the parish of Straiton. The date is unknown.
