= Cassell =

Cassell may refer to:

== Companies ==
- Cassell Military Paperbacks, an imprint of Orion Publishing Group
- Cassell's National Library
- Cassell (publisher) (Cassell Illustrated or Cassell & Co.), a British book publisher now owned by the Orion Publishing Group

== People ==
- Alan Cassell (1932–2017), Australian actor
- Albert Cassell (1895–1969), African American architect
- Alberta Jeannette Cassell (1926–2007), African American architect
- Alphonsus Cassell (1949–2010), calypso and soca musician professionally known as Arrow
- Charles E. Cassell (1842–1916), American architect
- Emma Frances Plecker Cassell ((1863–1944), American suffragist
- Halima Cassell (born 1975), Pakistani-British sculptor
- Jim Cassell, Youth Academy Director at Manchester City Football Club
- John Cassell (1817–1865), British publisher and businessperson
- Justin Cassell, Montserratian calypsonian
- Justine Cassell (born 1960), American researcher
- Justyn Cassell (born 1967), English rugby player
- Ollan Cassell (born 1937), American athlete
- Paul G. Cassell (born 1959), United States federal judge
- Rob Cassell (born 1983), Australian cricketer
- Sam Cassell (born 1969), American basketball player
- Scott Cassell (born 1960/1), American explorer and underwater filmmaker
- Wally Cassell (1912–2015), American character actor

== Places ==
=== United States ===
- Cassell, Wisconsin, an unincorporated community
- Cassell's Hamburgers

== Structures ==
- Cassell Coliseum, basketball arena on Virginia Tech campus

== See also ==
- Cassel (disambiguation)
- Cassels
- Cassells
