= Cassels =

Cassels is a surname. Notable people with the surname include:

- Andrew Cassels (born 1969), Canadian former ice hockey player
- Elsie Cassels (1864–1938), Scottish born naturalist and Canadian ornithologist
- John Franklin Cassels (1852–1930), member of the Mississippi House of Representatives
- John William Scott Cassels (1922–2015), English mathematician
- James Cassels (disambiguation), several people
- Richard Cassels (1690–1751), German architect who worked in Ireland
- Thomas F. Cassels (c. 1845–1903), African-American legislator from Tennessee during Reconstruction
- Walter Richard Cassels (1826–1907), English author
- William Wharton Cassels (1858–1925), missionary bishop

== See also ==
- Cassel (disambiguation)
- Cassell (disambiguation)
- Cassells
- Culzean Castle
- Kassel
- Clan Kennedy
- Cassels, Brock & Blackwell
