= Kirkoswald Parish Church =

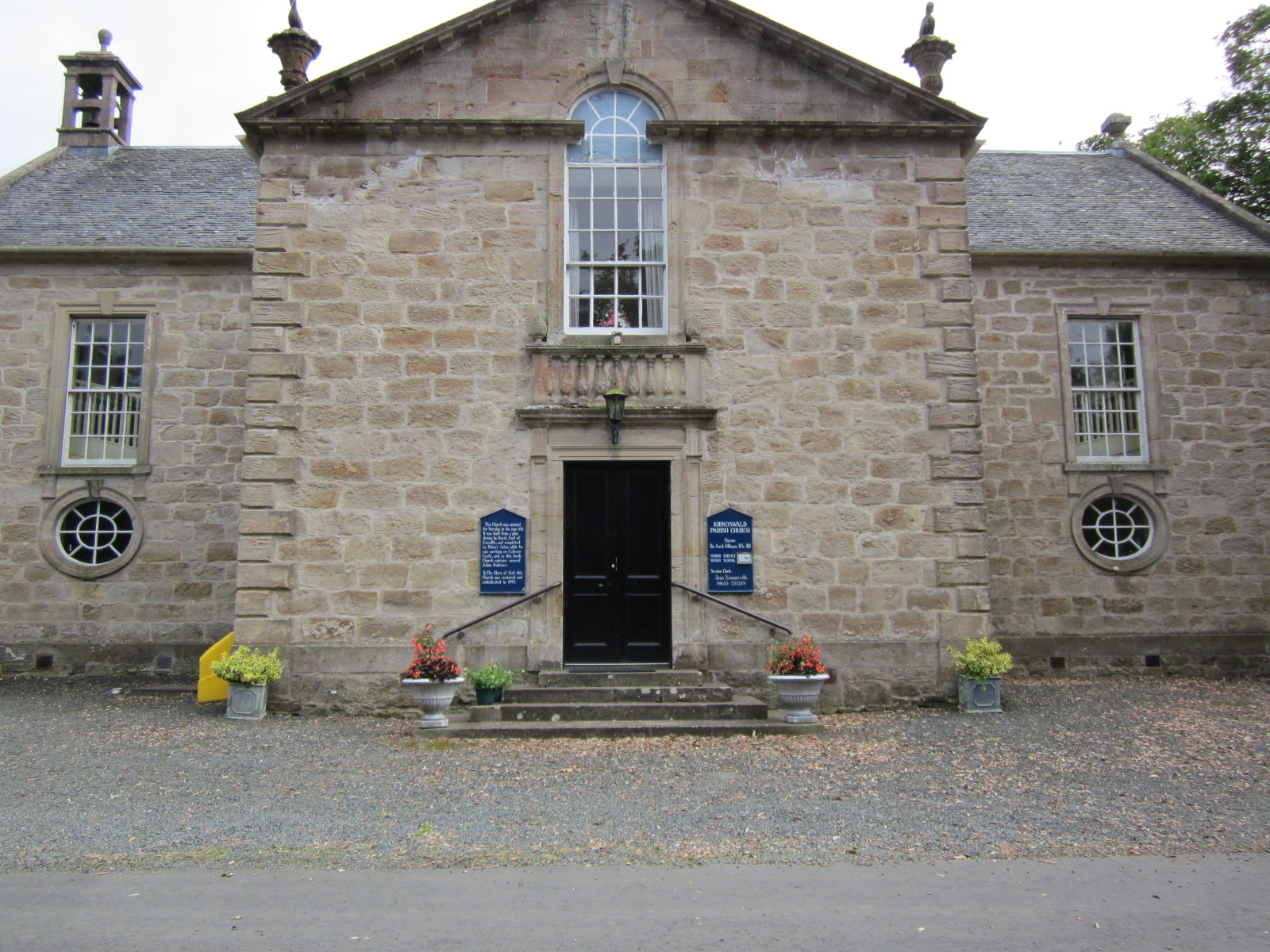
- Kirkoswald Parish Church
- Kirkoswald Parish Church
- 55.3288°N 4.7765°W
- Denomination: Church of Scotland
- Churchmanship: Ministers and Elders in C of S

Administration
- Parish: Kirkoswald

Kirkoswald Parish Church is located in the small village of Kirkoswald (on the A77 road), South Ayrshire, Scotland. It is a parish church in the Church of Scotland.

The church is unusual in that its design was, at the very least, strongly influenced by Robert Adam, one of Scotland's outstanding architects. He was working at the time on his masterpiece, Culzean Castle, and there are many Adam features about the church. It was built in 1777 and is essentially unchanged since. A fire in 1997 was confined within the ducted central heating system, and when that was being removed, wet rot, dry rot and plaster fungus were discovered. The building underwent a substantial renovation at that time, but the interior of the church was restored with only minor changes. The church was fortunate in being able to call on the architectural historians working at Culzean, and the colour scheme is now as close to the original as could be achieved.

This church was built as a replacement for an older church—built around 1220—the ruins of which are still visible in the village, in the middle of the old graveyard (55.3300°N 4.7779°W). The graveyard has a number of interesting graves, mainly because of the strong links with Robert Burns, whose mother (Agnes Broun) came from this village. The poet also spent around 9 months in the village in 1776, when he was 17, and most of the characters in his poem "Tam o' Shanter" are based on local people whose graves are in the old kirkyard and are suitably marked. One noteworthy grave not linked to Burns work is that of Scipio Kennedy, a black African slave who was brought to Scotland in 1702 and lived on the Culzean estate, and given his freedom in 1725.

The church, which is linked with Fisherton Parish Church, is without a minister since the retiral of Arrick Wilkinson at the beginning of February 2013.

== See also ==
- List of Church of Scotland parishes
