= Cassel =

Cassel may refer to:

== People ==
- Cassel (surname)

== Places ==
France

- Cassel, Nord, a town and commune in northern France
  - Battle of Cassel (1071)
  - Battle of Cassel (1328)
  - Battle of Cassel (1677)

Germany

- Cassel, Germany, a city in Hesse spelt as Kassel since 1926
  - Siege of Cassel (1762)

South Africa

- Cassel, Northern Cape

United States

- Cassel, California, a town
- Cassel, Wisconsin, a town
- New Cassel, New York, a hamlet

== See also ==
- Casel (disambiguation)
- Cassell (disambiguation)
- Cassells
- Cassels
