= Casal (disambiguation) =

Metalurgia Casal was the largest Portuguese motorcycle manufacturer, based in Aveiro.

Casal may also refer to:

- Casal (grape), a Portuguese wine grape variety
- Casalis (also casal), medieval Latin for a group of houses in the countryside

== People with the surname ==
- Antonio Casal (1910–1974), Spanish actor
- Gaspar Casal (1681–1759), Spanish physician who investigated pellagra
- Gregorio Casal (1935–2018), Mexican actor
- Julio J. Casal (1889–1954), Uruguayan poet and critic
- Luz Casal (born 1958), Spanish singer
- Marc Casal (born 1987), Andorran figure skater
- María Casal (born 1958), Spanish actress, daughter of Antonio Casal
- Neal Casal (1968-2019), American singer-songwriter
- Raúl Casal Ribeiro (1887-1956), Paraguayan vice president
- Selva Casal (1927–2020), Uruguayan poet, daughter of Julio J. Casal
- Sergio Casal (born 1962), Spanish tennis player
- Tino Casal (1950–1991), Spanish singer who died in a car crash
- Julián del Casal (1863–1893), Cuban poet

== See also ==
- Casale (disambiguation)
- Casals (surname)
- Casalnuovo (disambiguation)
- Casel (disambiguation)
