= Ronald Brunskill =

British architectural historian (1929–2015)

Ronald William Brunskill OBE (3 January 1929 – 9 October 2015) was an English academic who was Reader in Architecture at the University of Manchester. He was an authority on the history of architecture and particularly on British vernacular architecture.

He was born in Lowton and attended Bury High School, before studying architecture under Reginald Cordingley at the University of Manchester. After a two-year stint with the British Army, Brunskill was appointed to a London County Council commission of architects. He left that position to teach at his alma mater, then spent a year at the Massachusetts Institute of Technology as a Commonwealth Fund fellow. He joined Williams Deacon's Bank in 1957, and oversaw the maintenance of 250 branch offices, designing twenty new buildings. Brunskill returned to Manchester as reader in 1960.

Brunskill contributed significantly to assessing the date, extent and impact of the Great Rebuilding of England. Brunskill accepted that for much of England W. G. Hoskins's thesis that the Great Rebuilding spanned the period from 1570 to 1640. But Brunskill contended that the period varied both by region and by social class: starting in South East England and among the higher-income social classes, and then spreading both geographically west and north and socially to lower-income classes.

In 1990 Brunskill was awarded an OBE for services to conservation. He was married to Miriam Allsopp, with whom he had two daughters, from 1960 until his death in 2015.

== Published works ==
- Brick and Clay Building in Britain. New Haven: Yale University Press. 1990 [2009]. ISBN 0-300-11687-X.
- English Brickwork. London: Ward Lock & Co. 1978 [1977]. ISBN 0-7063-5087-1.
- Houses. London: HarperCollins. 1982. ISBN 0-00-216243-1.
- Houses and Cottages of Britain: Origins and Development of Traditional Buildings. Vernacular Buildings Series. London: Victor Gollancz Ltd. 2006. ISBN 0-575-07122-2.
- Illustrated Handbook of Vernacular Architecture (4th ed.). London: Faber and Faber. 2000 [1971]. ISBN 0-571-19503-2.
- Timber Building in Britain. London: Cassell's Reference. 2006 [2004]. ISBN 0-304-36665-X.
- Traditional Buildings of Britain: An Introduction to Vernacular Architecture. London: Cassell's. 2006 [1985]. ISBN 0-304-36676-5.
- Traditional Farm Buildings and Their Conservation. Vernacular Buildings. New Haven: Yale University Press. 2007. ISBN 978-0-300-12319-7.
- Traditional Farm Buildings of Britain. London: Victor Gollancz Ltd. 1999 [1982]. ISBN 0-575-06634-2.
- Traditional Buildings of Cumbria: The county of the Lakes. London: Cassell's Reference. 2002.
- Vernacular Architecture of the Lake Counties: A Field Handbook. London: Faber and Faber. 1978 [1974]. ISBN 0-571-09459-7.
