= Kirkoswald =

Kirkoswald may refer to:

- Kirkoswald, Cumbria, a civil parish and village in the District of Eden, England
- Kirkoswald, South Ayrshire, a village in South Ayrshire council area, Scotland
