= Cassells =

Cassells is a surname. Notable people with the surname include:

- Oliver Cassells (born 1988), Australian academic, podcast host
- Cyrus Cassells (born 1957), American poet
- Keith Cassells (born 1957), English footballer
- Thomas Cassells (1902–1944), Scottish politician
- William Wharton Cassells (died 1925), Anglican missionary, one of the Cambridge Seven

== See also ==
- Cassell's National Library, a weekly literature series
- Cassell (disambiguation)
- Cassels
- Cassell's Hamburgers, a restaurant in Los Angeles
