= Great Rebuilding =

Architectural history term

A Great Rebuilding is a period in which a heightened level of construction work, architectural change, or rebuilding occurred.

More specifically, W. G. Hoskins defined the term "The Great Rebuilding" in England as the period from the mid-16th century until 1640. Hoskins' initial theory held that during this period, improved economic conditions in England led to the expansion, rebuilding or architectural improvement of a large number of rural buildings.

The precise time period, extent and impact of "The Great Rebuilding" is contested. Ronald Brunskill accepts that in much of England it spanned the period 1570–1640, but that the period varied both by region and by social class. It was earliest in South East England, later in South West England and Cornwall, about 1670–1720 in Northern England and later still in Wales. In each region it affected higher-income social classes first and then progressed to lower-income classes.

== Sources and further reading ==
- Brunskill, R.W. (2006) [1985]. Traditional Buildings of Britain: An Introduction to Vernacular Architecture. Cassell's. ISBN 0-304-36676-5.
- Hoskins, W.G. (1953). "The Rebuilding of Rural England, 1570–1640". Past and Present (4): 44–59. doi:10.1093/past/4.1.44.
- Platt, Colin (1994). The Great Rebuildings of Tudor and Stuart England: Revolutions in Architectural Taste. Routledge. ISBN 1-85728-316-3.
- Wood, Jason (May 1995). "Two shots at a building revolution". British Archaeology (4).
