= Casals (surname) =

Casals (Eastern Catalan: [kəˈzals]) is a Catalan surname, the plural form of Casal (house). Notable persons with that surname include:

- Marta Casals Istomin (born 1936), wife of Pablo Casals and former president of Manhattan School of Music
- Pablo Casals (1876–1973), Catalan cellist and conductor
- Rosemary Casals (born 1948), American professional tennis player
- Stephen Casals, (born 1968), American artist
- Toni Casals Rueda (born 1980), Andorran ski mountaineer
- "Sammy Casals", a police detective in the film Heat portrayed by Wes Studi

== See also ==
Casal (disambiguation)
