= Troy, Sauk County, Wisconsin =

Town of Troy, Wisconsin
- Town
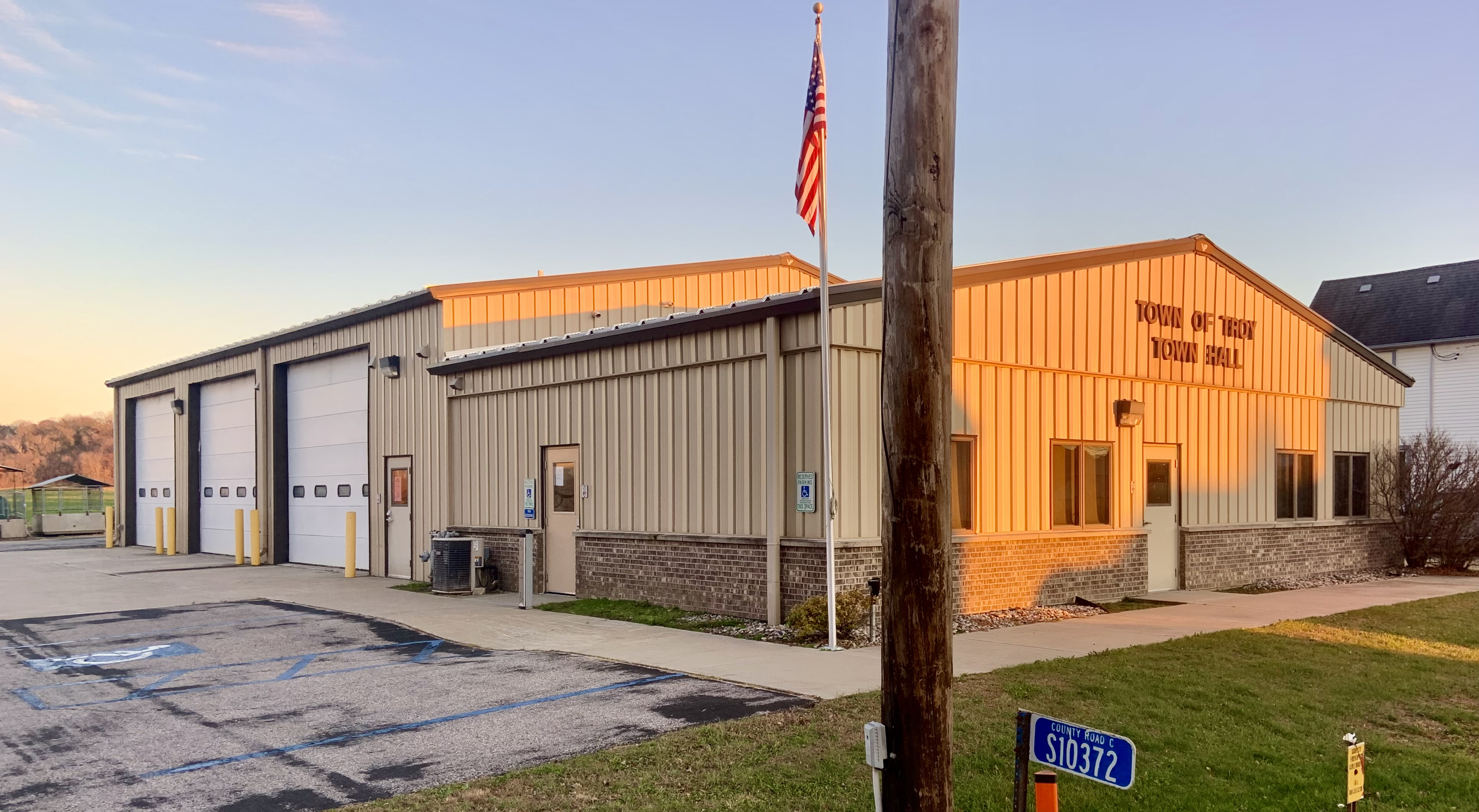
- Town hall

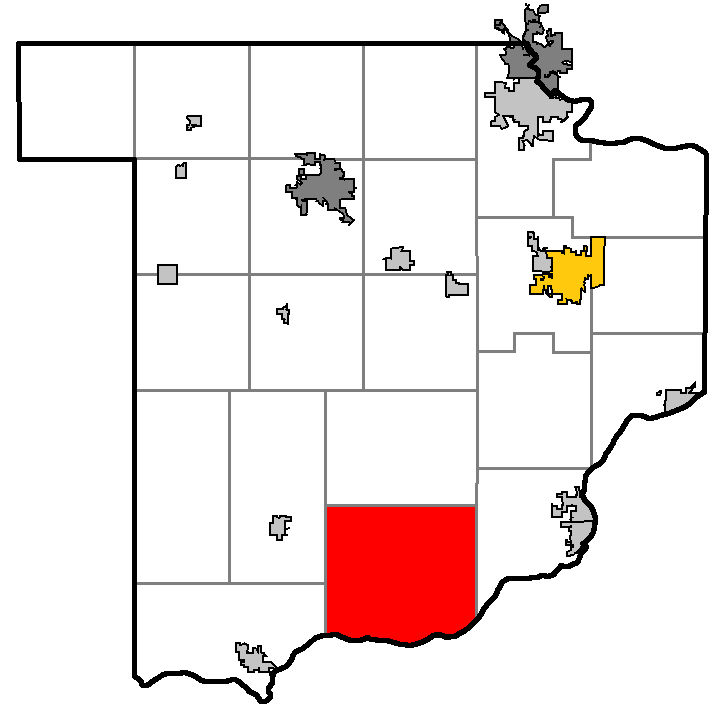
- Location of the Town of Troy, Sauk County, Wisconsin

- Location of Sauk County, Wisconsin
- Coordinates: 43°14′45″N 89°55′19″W
- Country: United States
- State: Wisconsin
- County: Sauk

Area
  - Total: 54.3 sq mi (140.6 km^{2})
  - Land: 53.1 sq mi (137.6 km^{2})
  - Water: 1.2 sq mi (3.0 km^{2})
- Elevation: 817 ft (249 m)

Population (2020)
  - Total: 781
  - Density: 14.7/sq mi (5.68/km^{2})
- Time zone: UTC-6 (Central (CST))
  - Summer (DST): UTC-5 (CDT)
- Area code: 608
- FIPS code: 55-80825
- GNIS feature ID: 1584298
- Website: http://www.townoftroysaukcounty.com/

The Town of Troy is located in Sauk County, Wisconsin, United States. The population was 781 at the 2020 census. The unincorporated communities of Black Hawk, Cassell, and Witwen are located in the town.

== History ==
The town was named after Troy, Ohio, the native home of an early settler.

== Geography ==
According to the United States Census Bureau, the town has a total area of 54.3 square miles (140.6 km^{2}), of which 53.1 square miles (137.6 km^{2}) is land and 1.1 square miles (3.0 km^{2}) (2.12%) is water.

== Demographics ==
As of the census of 2000, there were 773 people, 277 households, and 219 families residing in the town. The population density was 14.5 people per square mile (5.6/km^{2}). There were 300 housing units at an average density of 5.6 per square mile (2.2/km^{2}). The racial makeup of the town was 98.84% White, 0.52% from other races, and 0.65% from two or more races. Hispanic or Latino of any race were 0.65% of the population.

There were 277 households, out of which 36.1% had children under the age of 18 living with them, 69.0% were married couples living together, 6.5% had a female householder with no husband present, and 20.9% were non-families. 17.3% of all households were made up of individuals, and 5.4% had someone living alone who was 65 years of age or older. The average household size was 2.79 and the average family size was 3.17.

In the town the population was 28.2% under the age of 18, 7.8% from 18 to 24, 27.9% from 25 to 44, 25.1% from 45 to 64, and 11.0% who were 65 years of age or older. The median age was 38 years. For every 100 females, there were 101.8 males. For every 100 females age 18 and over, there were 107.1 males.

The median income for a household in the town was $39,432, and the median income for a family was $43,750. Males had a median income of $28,438 versus $23,984 for females. The per capita income for the town was $17,735. About 5.9% of families and 8.2% of the population were below the poverty line, including 10.5% of those under age 18 and 2.4% of those age 65 or over.

== Notable people ==
- Leroy Litscher, farmer and politician, was born in the town
