= Henry Morley =

English academic and professor

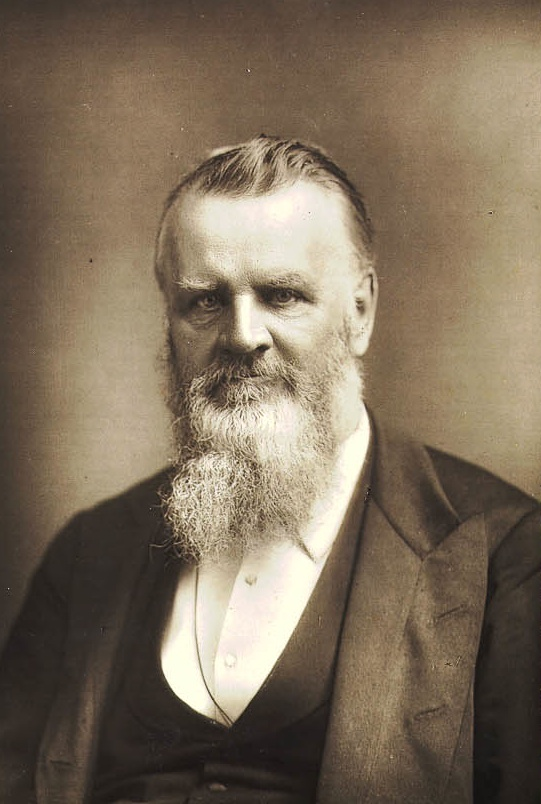
Henry Morley, circa 1888

Henry Morley (15 September 1822 – 14 May 1894) was an English academic who was one of the earliest professors of English literature in Great Britain. He also authored a popular book featuring biographies of notable English writers.

== Life ==
The son of apothecary Henry Morley, the younger Morley was born in Hatton Garden, London. He was educated at a Moravian Church school in Neuwied, Germany at the age of ten, from 1833 to 1835, then he attended a preparatory school in Stockwell and entered King's College London in 1838 for medical studies. Morley graduated in 1843 and became part of the Worshipful Society of Apothecaries, a professional organization, that same year.

Morley worked as a physician in partnership with another doctor in Madeley, Shropshire, but it turned into a financial failure because of the dishonesty of his partner who was unlicensed. In 1848, he established a school in Manchester and started writing in his spare time. Morley wrote some satirical articles that were published and gained the attention of Charles Dickens.

At Dickens' invitation, Morley moved to London in 1850 to become an editor of and a contributor to Dickens' publication, Household Words. When that publication dissolved, Morley worked for its successor, All the Year Round. From 1859 to 1864, Morley also edited and wrote for The Examiner.

From 1865 to 1889, Morley served as Professor of English Literature at University College London, his students including the Indian writer Rabindranath Tagore. Noted for his knowledge of English literature, Morley was considered to be an engaging and warm teacher. He also delivered popular lectures on literature in different parts of Great Britain. He was awarded an honorary LLD degree by the University of Edinburgh in 1879. Henry Morley was a strong supporter of degrees for women. He supported in particular Annie Leigh Browne when she opened in 1882 a residence for women students at Byng Place, renamed College Hall in 1886.

From 1882 to 1889, Morley was principal of University Hall, a research library in Bloomsbury, London.

Morley's biography was written in 1898 by Henry Shaen Solly, his son-in-law and former student.

Morley died on 14 May 1894 in Carisbrooke on the Isle of Wight and is buried at Carisbrooke Cemetery.

== Works ==
Morley was the author of biographies on Bernard Palissy, Heinrich Cornelius Agrippa, Gerolamo Cardano and Clément Marot. A popular and much reprinted title of his was Memoirs of Bartholomew Fair, first published in 1859. He also wrote introductions to two books written by John Locke—the 1884 edition of "Two Treatises of Government" and the 1889 edition of "A Letter Concerning Toleration".

Morley's principal work, however, was English Writers (10 volumes 1864-94), coming down to William Shakespeare. His First Sketch of English Literature—the study for the larger work—had reached at his death a circulation of 34,000 copies.

Morley was the editor of five book series. Morley's Universal Library, drawing on the concept of a universal library, was published from 1883 by George Routledge. He also edited the Carisbrooke Library and Companion Volumes, were also published by Routledge. Cassell's National Library was published from 1886, totalling 209 weekly editions, and the Library of English Literature were also edited by him, were published by Cassell & Company.

== Collections ==
University College London Special Collections holds a collection of letters from Morley to W J Hiscoke written between 1887 - 1893.
