= James Cassels =

James Cassels may refer to:

- James Cassels (British Army officer) (1907–1996), chief of the British General Staff 1965–1968
- James Cassels (politician) (1877–1972), British Conservative member of parliament 1922–1929 and 1931–1935
- James Macdonald Cassels (1924–1994), British physicist

== See also ==
- Jim Cassell, British football director
