= Thomaston Castle =

Castle in South Ayrshire, Scotland

Coordinates: 55.3482°N 4.7774°W

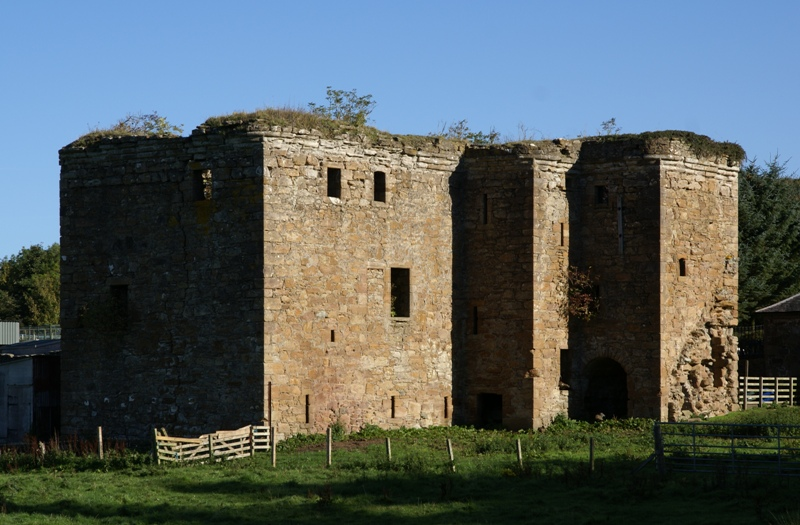
- Thomaston Castle
- Interactive map of Thomaston Castle

Scheduled monument
- Official name: Thomaston Castle
- Designated: 7 December 1998
- Reference no.: SM7865

Thomaston Castle is a medieval castle located west of Maybole, South Ayrshire, Scotland. It looks much as it did hundreds of years ago. Little has changed, except for the addition of a house located on the property. The castle is run down and has debris falling in on it.

Thomaston Castle was originally built in the 13th century for a nephew of Robert The Bruce, and first owned by Alan McIlvaine (b. 1500 in Ayrshire) whose family supplied wine to the Earls Kennedy, owners of nearby Culzean Castle. Upon his death, Thomaston passed to Patrick McIlvaine on his marriage to Isobel Kennedy, a daughter of Gilbert Kennedy, 3rd Earl of Cassilis.
