= Witwen, Wisconsin =

- populated place
- Location within Wisconsin Location within the United States
- Coordinates: 43°17′07″N 89°53′14″W
- Country: United States
- State: Wisconsin
- County: Sauk
- Elevation: 764 ft (233 m)
- Time zone: UTC-6 (Central (CST))
  - Summer (DST): UTC-5 (CDT)
- Area code: 608
- GNIS feature ID: 1576926

Witwen is an populated place in the town of Troy, Sauk County, Wisconsin, United States. Witwen is located on County Highway E, 8.4 miles (13.5 km) west of Sauk City.

The community was named for G. and J. P. Witwen, the operators of a local mill.
