= Kirkoswald, South Ayrshire =

Coordinates: 55°19′48″N 4°46′00″W

Kirkoswald: Scottish Gaelic: Cill Osailt; Scots: Kirkossald
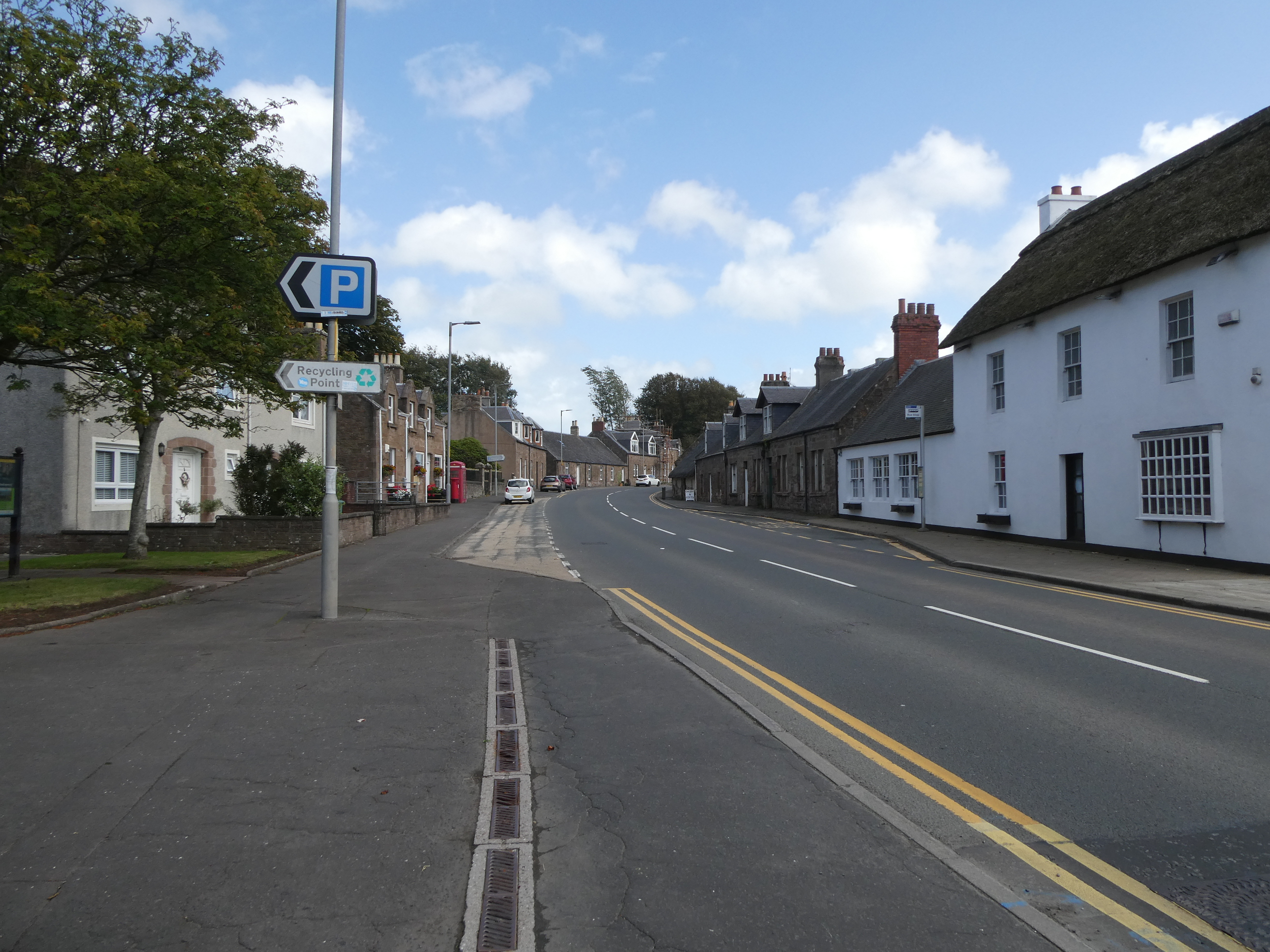
- The Main Street

- Location within South Ayrshire
- Population: 194
- OS grid reference: NS240075
- Council area: South Ayrshire
- Lieutenancy area: Ayrshire and Arran
- Country: Scotland
- Sovereign state: United Kingdom
- Post town: MAYBOLE
- Postcode district: KA19
- Dialling code: 01655
- Police: Scotland
- Fire: Scottish
- Ambulance: Scottish
- UK Parliament: Ayr, Carrick and Cumnock
- Scottish Parliament: Carrick, Cumnock and Doon Valley

Kirkoswald (Scots: Kirkossald) is a village and parish in the Carrick district of Ayrshire, Scotland, 1 3/4 miles (3 km) from the coast and 4 miles (6.4 km) southwest of Maybole. It takes its name from its kirk (church), dedicated to Oswald of Northumbria, who is said to have won a battle here in the 7th century. The old church, which was built in 1244 and houses the baptismal font of Robert the Bruce, is now a ruin in the grounds of the modern church, which was built in 1777 to a design by Robert Adam. Kirkoswald is also noted for its connection with Robert Burns, whose maternal ancestors, the Brouns, were from the village. Burns also attended school here, and would later base the characters Tam o' Shanter, Kirkton Jean and souter Johnnie on village locals Douglas Graham, Jean Aird and John Davidson, the shoemaker.

Kirkoswald village had a population of 194 in 1991. Kirkoswald parish is 23.3 square miles (60 km^{2}) in area, and also contains the coastal village of Maidens. Landmarks include Turnberry Castle, the ancient seat of the Earls of Carrick, Culzean Castle, Thomaston Castle and Crossraguel Abbey.

Rev Robert Hunter Arbuckle was minister of the Free Church from 1860 and 1897.

== Gallery ==
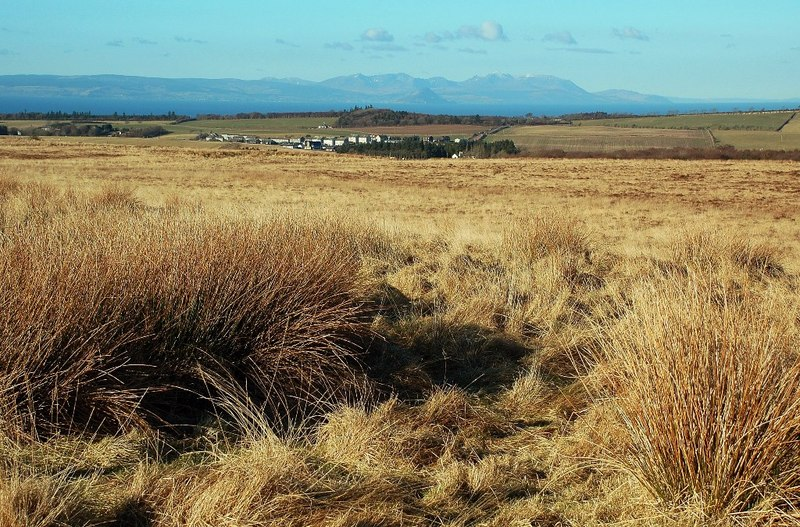
View of the village from the neighbouring moorland

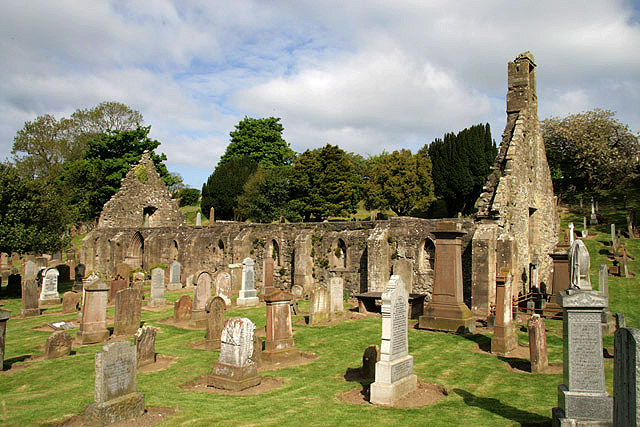
The old church

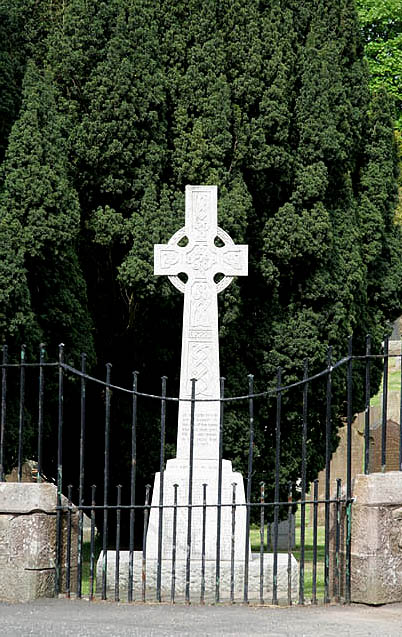
The War memorial

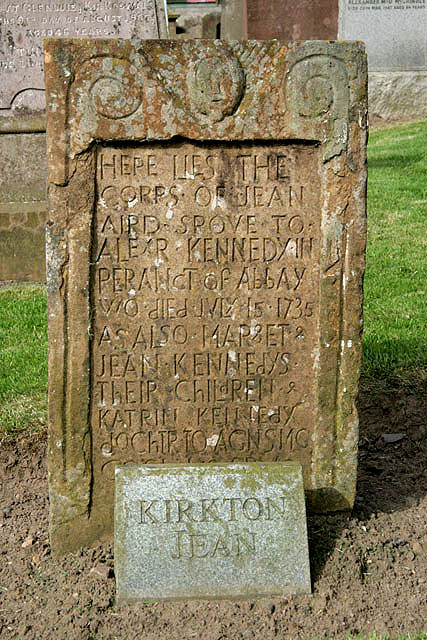
The grave of 'Kirkton Jean'

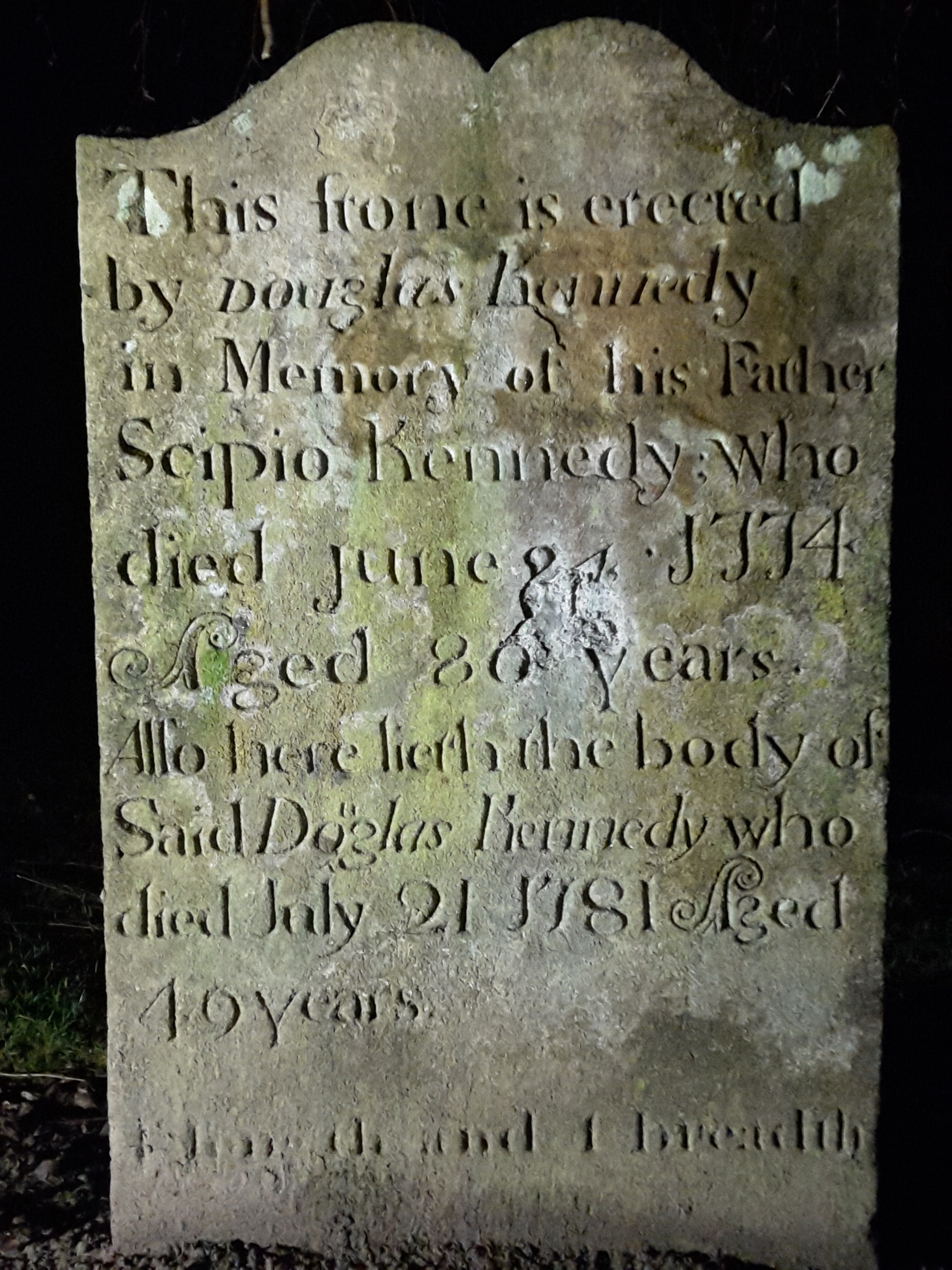
Grave marker for former slave Scipio Kennedy

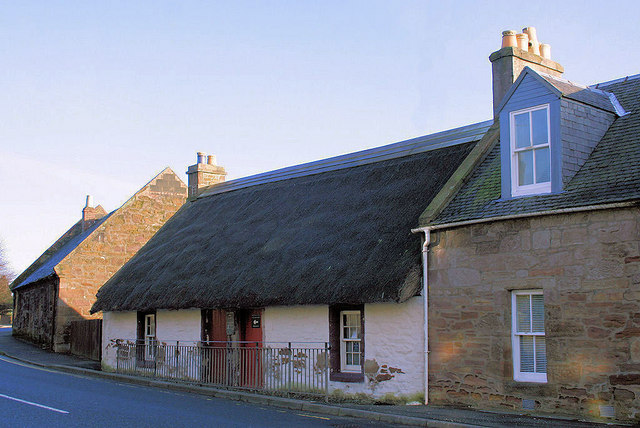
Souter Johnnie's cottage, now owned by the National Trust

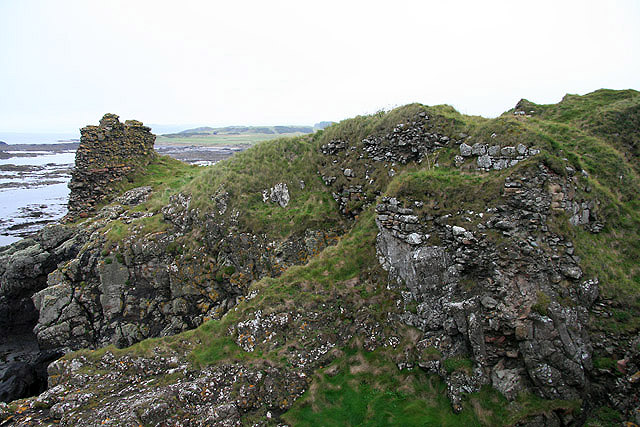
The remains of Turnberry Castle

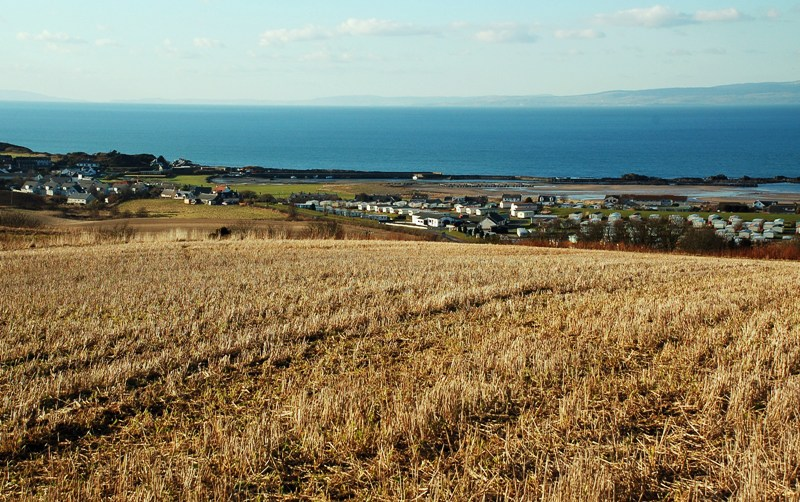
View of Maidens village

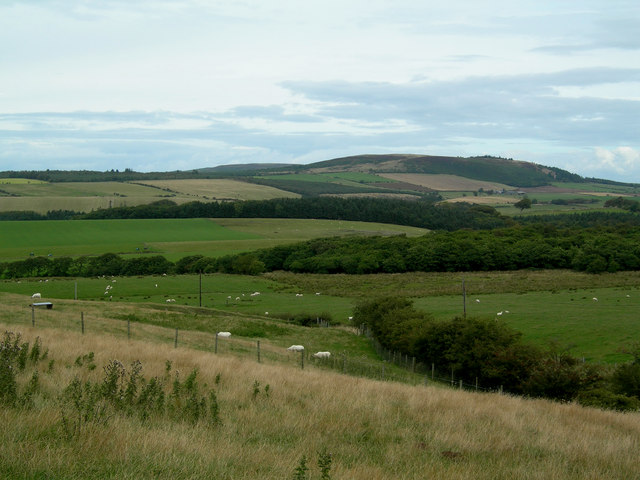
View towards Mochrum Hill
