= Leroy Litscher =

American farmer and politician

Leroy "Pete" Litscher (January 15, 1922 – October 15, 2000) was an American farmer and politician.

Born in the Town of Troy, Sauk County, Wisconsin, he graduated from Prairie du Sac High School and was a dairy farmer. He was involved with the Wisconsin Farmers Union and the Baraboo Dairy Producers. Litscher served on the Lower Narrows and Baraboo School Boards. He also served on the Sauk County Board of Supervisors and was a Democrat. In 1975, Wisconsin Governor Patrick Lucey appointed Litscher to the Wisconsin Cable Television Study Commission. Litscher was elected to the Wisconsin State Assembly in a November special election 1975 and was reelected in 1976 serving until 1979. He died in Baraboo, Wisconsin.
