= Casel =

Casel may refer to:

== People ==
- Ayodele Casel (born 1975), American actress and dancer
- Nitanju Bolade Casel, American singer
- Odo Casel (1886–1948), also known as Johannes Casel, German Catholic theologian and monk

== Other uses ==
- CASEL, the Collaborative for Academic, Social, and Emotional Learning, American education institute
- Schloss Casel, a manor house in Kasel-Golzig, Brandenburg, Germany

== See also ==
- Casal (disambiguation)
- Cassel (disambiguation)
