= Julio J. Casal =

Uruguayan poet & critic (1889–1954)

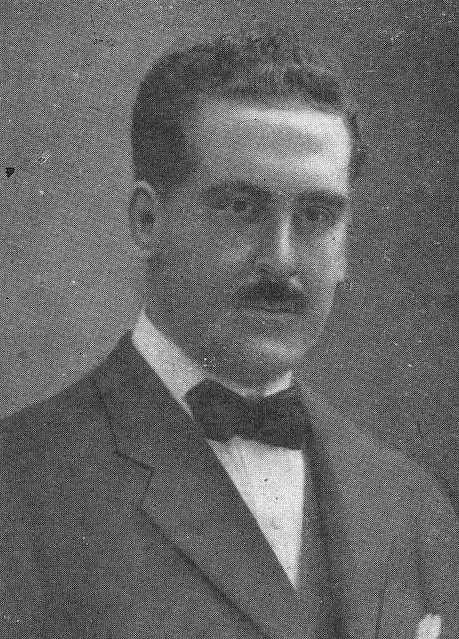
- Born: June 18, 1889
- Died: December 7, 1954 (aged 65)
- Occupations: poet and critic

Julio J. Casal (18 June 1889 Montevideo – 7 December 1954) was an Uruguayan poet and critic.

Casal was the founder of the literary magazine Alfar. He edited the poetry anthology Exposición de la poesía uruguaya.

Casal died in 1954. His daughter Selva Casal is also a renowned poet.

== Works ==
- Regrets (poesía), Madrid, 1910.
- Allá lejos (poesía), Madrid, 1912.
- Cielos y llanuras (poesía), Madrid, 1914.
- Nuevos Horizontes (poesía), Madrid, 1916.
- Huerto maternal (poesía), Madrid, 1919.
- Humildad (poesía), Madrid, 1921.
- 56 poemas (poesía), Madrid, 1921.
- Árbol (poesía), La Coruña, 1925.
- Colina de la música (poesía), Montevideo, 1933.
- Exposición de la poesía uruguaya desde sus orígenes hasta 1940 (antología), Montevideo, Claridad, 1940.
- Cuaderno de otoño (poesía), Buenos Aires, Losada, 1947.
- Recuerdo de cielo (poesía), Montevideo, 1949.
- Rafael Barradas (ensayo), Buenos Aires, Losada, 1949.
- Distante álamo (poesía), Montevideo, 1956.
- Poesía, Montevideo, Aquí Poesía, 1964.
- Antología de prosa y poesía, Montevideo, 1966.
