= Selva Casal =

Uruguayan poet (1927–2020)

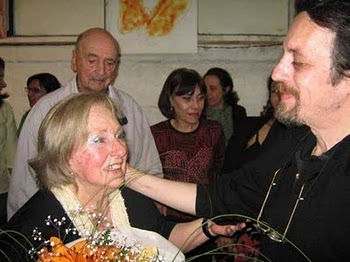
Photo of Selva Casal

Selva Casal (11 January 1927 – 27 November 2020) was a Uruguayan poet.

== Life ==
She was born in Montevideo. Her father Julio J. Casal was also a poet and the founder of a noted literary magazine Alfar. Her debut collection Arpa appeared in 1958. She published more than a dozen collections and won numerous prizes for her poetry.

== Works ==
- Biografía de un arcángel (Estuario editora, 2012)
- En este lugar maravilloso vive la tristeza (Estuario editora, 2011)
- El grito (Editorial Artefato, 2005)
- Vivir es peligroso (Libros de Tierra Firme, 2001, Buenos Aires; Premio del Ministerio de Cultura)
- Perdidos manuscritos de la noche (Carlos Marchest Editor, 1996; Premio del Ministerio de Cultura)
- Hombre mutilado (inédito, 1988; Mención Honorífica Internacional. Concurso de Poesía Plural México)
- Los misiles apuntan a mi corazón (Ediciones de la Banda Oriental, 1988)
- Mi padre Julio J. Casal (ensayo lírico documental) (Biblioteca Alfar, 1987) [Dibujos de Barradas]
- Nadie ninguna soy (Biblioteca Alfar, 1983; 1º Premio de la Fundación Argentina para la Poesía, 1º Premio Municipal de Poesía en Uruguay)
- No vivimos en vano (Biblioteca Alfar, 1975)
- Han asesinado al viento (Editorial Alfa, 1971)
- Poemas 65 (Cuadernos Julio Herrera y Reissig, 1965 – Trad. al inglés Poetry review de la University of Tampa, 1966 – USA)
- Poemas de las cuatro de la tarde (Biblioteca Alfar, 1962 – Premio Municipal de Poesía)
- Días sobre la tierra (Cuadernos Julio Herrera y Reissig, 1960 – Melón editora, 2013, Buenos Aires)
- Arpa (Colección Delmira, 1958 – Premio del Ministerio de Instrucción Pública, 1954)

== Anthologies and compilations ==
- Ningún día es jueves (Ediciones de Hermes Criollo, 2007)
- El infierno es una casa azul y otros poemas (Libros de Tierra Firme, 1999, Buenos Aires)
- El infierno es una casa azul (Ediciones de Uno, 1993; Premio del Ministerio de Cultura)
