= Cassel, South Africa =

Cassel
- Location within Northern Cape Location within South Africa
- Coordinates: 26.966°S 23.980°E
- Country: South Africa
- Province: Northern Cape
- District: John Taolo Gaetsewe
- Municipality: Joe Morolong
  - Cllr Onalenna Matsioloko: (ANC)

Area
  - Total: 4.95 km^{2} (1.91 sq mi)

Population (2011)
  - Total: 3,895
  - Density: 787/km^{2} (2,040/sq mi)

Racial makeup (2011)
  - Black African: 98.4%
  - Coloured: 0.8%
  - Indian/Asian: 0.3%
  - Other: 0.5%

First languages (2011)
  - Tswana: 92.4%
  - English: 1.6%
  - Zulu: 1.1%
  - Other: 4.9%
- Time zone: UTC+2 (SAST)
- Postal code (street): 8587
- PO box: 8587

Cassel is a village near Kuruman, in John Taolo Gaetsewe District Municipality in the Northern Cape province of South Africa.

Cassel Village is situated 90 km North West of Kuruman in the Northern Cape Province of the Republic of South Africa. Cassel is under the chieftaincy of the Batlhaping-ba-ga-Phuduhutswana in the last legally and traditionally recognised chief, Kgosi Mothusi Godfrey Thaganyane *deceased*. The late Kgosi Mothusi G. Thaganyane did not have a son. Consequently, the chieftaincy is yet to be traditionally handed over to his eldest daughter. However the daughter is still a minor and as a result the chieftaincy is still under controversial discussions as to who has to be an interim chief.

Cassel has two effective pre-schools in Kaing and Kagishong Early Learning Centres, two primary schools called Pulelo and Simololang, one Kopano Middle School and the one high school named after the wife of the late Kgosi M.G. Thaganyane, Nametsegang High School.

Cassel has very low infrastructure especially water and sanitation. People are getting water from the communal taps while they also use pit toilets. The level of employment is very low and most of the economically active people are working at Kuruman and Kathu areas either as mine workers and others as domestic workers. The village also has an annual problem or experience of people who found themselves working as seasonal workers in the areas of Upington and Kakamas. These workers are living behind children with no food to survive.

Demographics Total number of population per EA.= 3894 (2010) Population Group Black African = 3834 Coloured = 30 White = 00 Indian or Asian = 09 Others = 21

DOMESTIC LIVESTOCK Cattles Goats Donkeys Sheep Horses Chickens Dogs Cats

Type of Work: Mines Domestic Work Farms Seasonal Work Government Self employed

School and ECDs: ECD - Kagishong Crech, Kaing Pre school, D.S Bosman ECD Primary- Simololang Primary and Pulelo Primary Intermediate - Kopano Secondary/High - Nametsegang

Opportunities in the Area (Strength of the Community) •Human Resource –Skills (There are local people with sewing skills) •Agricultural opportunities (Farming in both Animal and Crop Production)

Community Needs: •Sports Ground •Community hall •Road Infrastructure and Maintenance •Police station •Employment •Orphanage or Charity home •Hospital •Infrastructure the for disabilities and old age •Abet schools

Mode of Transport: Taxis Bicycles Donkey Carts Hitch-hiking

Libraries: Post Office Kutlwano Youth Centre
