= Scipio Kennedy =

African slave in 18th-century Scotland

- Born: 1694 (estimated); Guinea (region)
- Died: 1774; Kirkoswald, South Ayrshire, Scotland
- Known for: Enslaved African living at Culzean Castle in Scotland and having living descendants

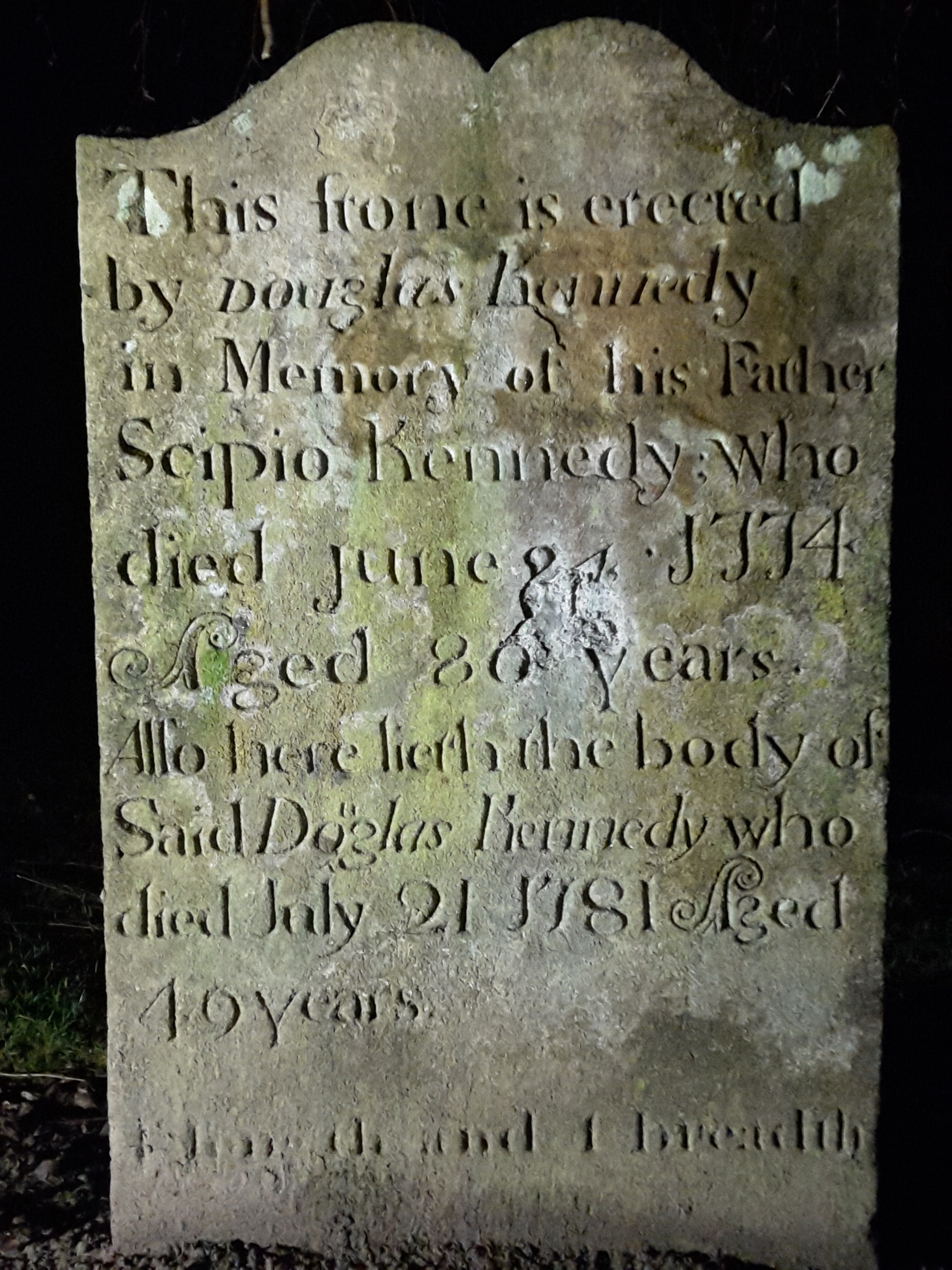
Grave marker for former slave Scipio Kennedy at Kirkoswald Old Churchyard, Ayrshire, Scotland

Scipio Kennedy (c. 1694–1774) was a slave who was taken as a child from Guinea (region) in West Africa. After being purchased at the age of five or six by Captain Andrew Douglas of Mains, he worked as a slave under his daughter, Jean, wife of Sir John Kennedy, 2nd Baronet of Culzean in Ayrshire, Scotland. He was granted a manumission (freedom from slavery) in 1725, but continued to work for the Kennedy family and was given land on the estate. He married in 1728 and had at least eight children. At least one living descendant is known from the west of Scotland and has published the story of his ancestor in a Scottish national newspaper.

== African slaves in Scotland ==
The commercial success of the slave-worked plantations of the late seventeenth century led to a fashion for Scottish families of the gentry class to keep black African servants. Merchants importing goods from the Caribbean and Americas made regular contact with slave ships and some were "redeemed" (purchased) for domestic service. Men and boys were more likely than women and girls to be taken into service, often in highly visible roles such as page boys or footmen. They might be given pet names, or names that sarcastically poked fun at their powerlessness, such as "Caesar". Their lives were often much easier than that of their counterparts in the New World plantations, and they were often given an education so that they could read and write. They were also expected to become Christians and to receive baptism. By the end of the eighteenth century, they were seen as equal human beings under the law.

== Scipio's journey to Ayrshire ==
In about the year 1700, when Scipio was aged five or six, he was captured in West Africa and taken onto a slave ship in the area known as the Gulf of Guinea. Given the normal route that these ships took, it is likely that he was transported to an island in the Caribbean before being redeemed by Andrew Douglas of Mains (which is near Milngavie in Dunbartonshire) and transported to Scotland in 1702. Douglas would probably have chosen the name Scipio, whose namesake Scipio Africanus served the Roman Empire, defeating the numerically superior forces of Hannibal in the Punic Wars. Douglas had a daughter, Jean, who married John Kennedy in 1705, and Scipio moved to Culzean with them. During this time Scipio learned to read, write and also some textile manufacture. In March 1711, on the death of his father John Kennedy succeeded as the 2nd baronet.

== Life after freedom ==
Scipio's manumission document is held at the National Archives of Scotland. It is dated 1725 and grants Scipio the freedom to take employment elsewhere. The document records the "clothing, maintenance and education with more than ordinary kindness" already given to Scipio by the Kennedy family. It also details the terms of his further employment by them in a nineteen-year breakable contract, to be rewarded with "the sum of twelve pounds Scots money yearly besides my share of the drink money". The document is signed by John Kennedy and Scipio.

In 1728, Scipio was recorded as having fathered a daughter, Elizabeth, by fornication with Margaret Gray. This would have been considered a scandalous event within the parish. Scipio married Margaret later that year and the couple had seven further children.

== Scipio's house ==
An estate map was drawn up in the 1750s by John Foulis of Redburn, a copy of which is kept in Culzean Castle. The map shows a building on a piece of land about 800 metres from the castle, near to the current walled garden, and it is overwritten with the word "Sipios". The house cost £90 to build when new, and was probably an impressive building made of stone. The area of the grounds where the house once stood was excavated in 2007; some artifacts were found during the excavation which may have been Scipio's personal property.

== Lady Kennedy's will ==
Jean Kennedy's will dated 1751, records the gift from her estate "to Scipio Kennedy my old servant, the sum of ten pounds sterling". As this figure is of a similar order to the amount given to each of her grandchildren (a third each of £40), this seems to show that Scipio was considered to be part of the Kennedy family.

== Memorial stone ==
In Kirkoswald Old Church graveyard, there is a stone commemorating the life of Scipio, erected by one of his sons. The stone does not explicitly say that Scipio is buried in that place, but that his son is "also" buried there. The stone reads:

This stone is erected by Douglas Kennedy in Memory of his father Scipio Kennedy who died June 24, 1774 Aged 80 years.
Also here lieth the body of said Douglas Kennedy who died July 21, 1781 aged 49 years.

The text at the bottom reads "1 length and 1 breadth" and is not part of the inscription, but is to define the burial plot.

== Descendants ==
Some authors have raised the question of Scipio's descendants. In May 2012, The Scotsman published an article written by Jonathan Sharp, which details his personal research into his family history. He traced his lineage back through to one of Scipio's daughters, Elizabeth Kennedy in Kirkoswald, and thence to Scipio himself.
