= Thomas F. Cassels =

American politician (c.1845-1903)

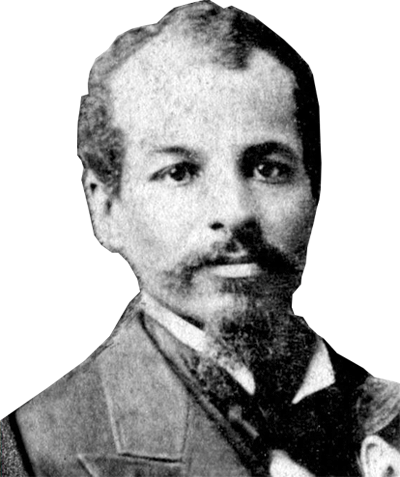

Tennessee House of Representatives
- In office 1881–1882

Personal details
- Born: Thomas Frank Cassels c. 1845 Berlin Crossroads, Ohio, U.S.
- Died: April 2, 1903 (aged 57–58) Memphis, Tennessee
- Cause of death: tuberculosis
- Party: Republican
- Spouse: Emma Frances Lett

Thomas Frank Cassels (c. 1845 – April 2, 1903) was an attorney and politician in Memphis, Tennessee who served a term in the Tennessee House of Representatives for the 42nd General Assembly (1881–1882). A Republican, he represented Shelby County, Tennessee.

He was the first African-American admitted to the bar association in Memphis. He represented Ida B. Wells in her lawsuit against C&O Railroad. He served as Assistant Attorney General in Memphis and was a presidential elector in 1888.
