= Emma Frances Plecker Cassell =

American suffragist (1863–1944)

- Born: Emma Frances Plecker; June 15, 1863; Augusta County, Virginia
- Died: April 8, 1944 (aged 80); King's Daughters Hospital, Staunton, Virginia
- Education: Augusta Female Seminary
- Occupation: Suffragist

Emma Frances Plecker Cassell (June 15, 1863 – April 8, 1944) was an American suffragist.

She was born as Emma Frances Plecker on June 15, 1863, in Augusta County, Virginia. She attended Augusta Female Seminary, currently Mary Baldwin University, in Staunton, Virginia, where she studied both sciences and liberal arts. She began her volunteer work at churches and patriotic societies in the late 19th century. Plecker Cassell was an historian for the Presbytery and the Women's Auxiliary of the Synod of Virginia.

== Work ==
Cassell began her volunteer work at churches and patriotic societies in the late 19th century. She was an historian for the Presbytery and the Women's Auxiliary of the Synod of Virginia.

Plecker Cassell was involved with the church. Her activities evolved from teaching members how to sew to ultimately serving as president of the Society for Women's Work at First Presbyterian Church in Staunton, Virginia.

== Activism and patriotism ==
Cassell, as a respected leader, successfully initiated the Bath County chapter of the United Daughters of the Confederacy in 1912, and a Staunton chapter of the Children of the Confederacy (an auxiliary of the United Daughters of the Confederacy) in 1914. Within five years, her chapter had the largest enrollment in the Commonwealth.

== Personal life ==
In 1884, Emma Frances Plecker married Julius Frederick Ferdinand Cassell.

== Death ==
Emma Frances Plecker Cassell died on 8 April 1944 at King’s Daughters Hospital in Staunton.
