= Cassell, Wisconsin =

- Unincorporated community
- Location within Wisconsin Location within the United States
- Coordinates: 43°12′24″N 89°52′30″W
- Country: United States
- State: Wisconsin
- County: Sauk
- Elevation: 732 ft (223 m)
- Time zone: UTC-6 (Central (CST))
  - Summer (DST): UTC-5 (CDT)
- Area code: 608
- GNIS feature ID: 1577539

Cassell is an unincorporated community located in the town of Troy, Sauk County, Wisconsin, United States.

The community bears the name of one J. N. Cassell.
