= Cassel (surname) =

Cassel is a surname. Notable people with the surname include:

- Christine K. Cassel, American physician
- David Cassel, German historian and Jewish theologian
- Erik Cassel, Co-founder of Roblox
- Ernest Cassel, British capitalist
- Felix Cassel, British Judge Advocate-General
- (Karl) Gustav Cassel, 1866–1945, Swedish economist
- Hartwig Cassel, German chess promoter
- Henry B. Cassel, U.S. congressman from Pennsylvania
- Jack Cassel, Major League Baseball player
- Jean-Pierre Cassel, French actor
- Jochen Cassel (born 1981), German badminton player
- Marcus Cassel, American football player
- Matt Cassel, American football quarterback
- Paulus Stephanus Cassel, 19th century Jewish convert to Christianity
- Sandra Cassel, American actress
- Seymour Cassel (1935–2019), American actor
- Vincent Cassel, French actor

== Fictional characters ==
- Gil Cassel, a character in the Star Wars: Legacy graphic novel series
- Jared Cassel, a character in the Star Wars: Legacy graphic novel series
- Jory Cassel, a character from the "A Song of Ice and Fire" fantasy series
- Ser Rodrik Cassel, a character from the "A Song of Ice and Fire" fantasy series
