= Jim Cassell =

English footballer and player developer

James Cassell (born 23 April 1947) is an English former footballer who played as a midfielder, and later worked as the youth academy director at Manchester City. He has been responsible for the development of players such as Shaun Wright-Phillips, Joey Barton, Stephen Ireland, Nedum Onuoha, Daniel Sturridge, Michael Johnson and Micah Richards and many others.

== Career ==
Cassell, born in Prestwich, is a former professional player himself; at one point he was on the books of Manchester United, but it was at Bury during the 1970–71 season that he made his only professional appearances; he played three times in the league, including once as substitute. He eventually had to retire from playing professionally due to a knee injury, though did play for Horwich RMI and Radcliffe Borough in the Cheshire League semi-professionally.

Cassell was the former Chief Scout at Oldham Athletic where he was responsible for initiating the successful scouting and youth policy. Cassell joined Manchester City in July 1997 to oversee the development of the academy.

Cassell also has 19 years experience working in local government.

His excellence in Manchester City's youth programme led them to victory in the FA Youth Cup Final in 2008. He was removed from his position at Manchester City in May 2013, to take on a new role within the academy as International Academy Director.
