= Cassell's Hamburgers =

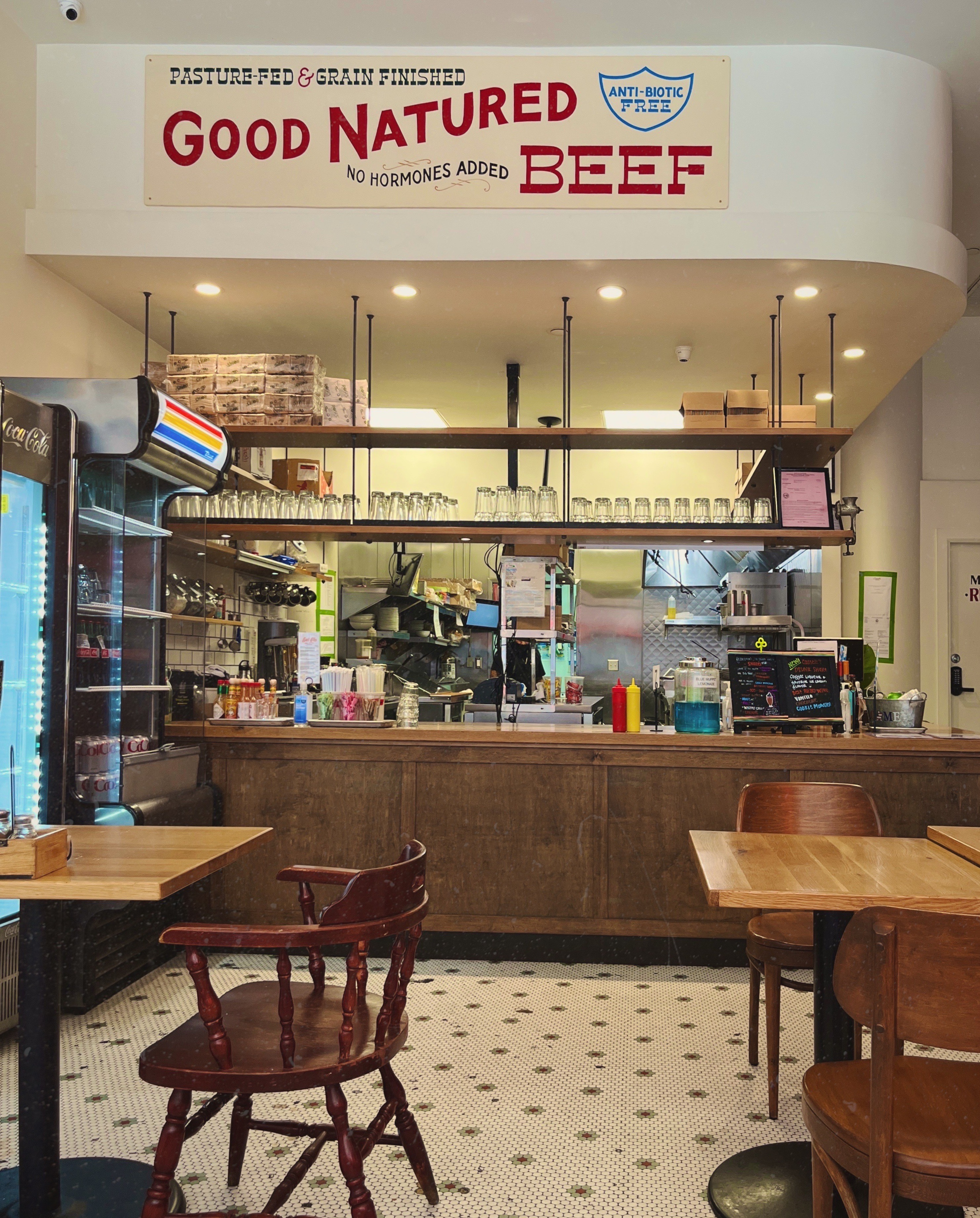
- Interior of the Downtown Los Angeles location prior to its closure (2022)
- Interactive map of Cassell's Hamburgers

Restaurant information
- Established: 1948; 78 years ago
- Food type: American cuisine
- Location: 3600 West 6th Street, Los Angeles, California, 90020, United States
- Coordinates: 34°03′48″N 118°18′03″W
- Other locations: 1021 Alpine Street, Los Angeles
- Website: cassellshamburgers.com

Cassell's Hamburgers is a restaurant specializing in hamburgers. First opened in 1948, its main location is at the Hotel Normandie on 6th Street in the Koreatown neighborhood of Los Angeles.

== Description ==
The restaurant serves hamburgers, veggie burgers, milkshakes and malts, cocktails and beer. At various times in its history, the restaurant notably did not serve french fries, although it did serve house made potato chips. It serves various sandwiches, including a tuna melt made with freshly poached tuna.

The restaurant is modeled after a classic diner.

== History ==
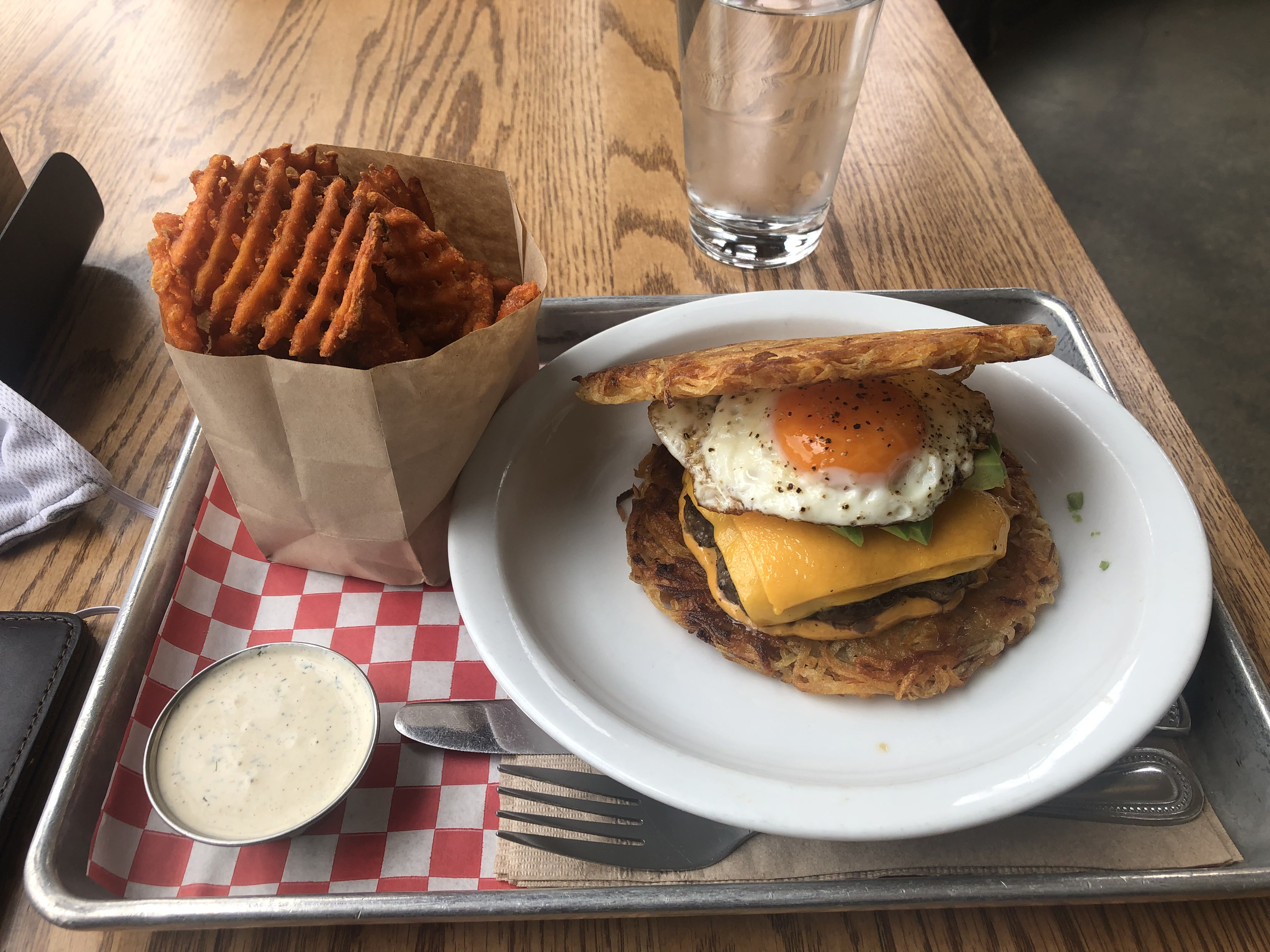
A breakfast burger at Cassell's, served at the Koreatown location

The restaurant was founded as Cassell's Patio by Alvin Cassell in 1948. It was originally located on Wilshire Boulevard across the street from Bullocks Wilshire before relocating to 6th Street near Berendo Street. It was known for serving hamburgers, patty melts, and pie. The hamburgers came in two sizes, a third of a pound or two thirds of a pound, and were made of USDA Prime beef. Cassell served freshly made items including mayonnaise, potato salad, and lemonade. He did not originally serve French fries, instead offering sides like potato salad, fruit, and potato chips. Cassell made the choice not to offer fries because he felt that "the more things you do, the less chance there is of reaching perfection."

Al Cassell attempted to franchise the business during the mid-1980s, but the other operations were considered inferior and closed shortly after opening. Cassell retired during the 1990s and sold his business to Helen Kim, who added french fries to the menu, along with turkey burgers and veggie burgers.

The restaurant closed in 2012 before reopening a few blocks away in December 2014. The restaurant is currently located in the Hotel Normandie at the corner of 6th and Normandie, It is owned by Jingbo Lou, executive chef Christian Page and Page's wife, pastry chef Elia Aboumrad. Lou is also the owner of the hotel.

A new location with an expanded menu was opened on 8th Street in Downtown Los Angeles in October 2018, and only to close five years later in September 2023 due to the impact of the COVID-19 pandemic on the restaurant industry.

After the Eighth Street closed in 2023, Lou and associates opened a third location in mid-2024 on Alpine Street on the edge of Chinatown in another commercial development owned and renovated by Lou.

During the late 2010s, Cassell's briefly had a temporary restaurant at Indian Wells for the Indian Wells Open and a restaurant at Terminal 1 of Los Angeles International Airport.

Some after 2022, Page and Aboumrad decided to leave California and dropped their associations with Cassell's to focus on the couple's out-of-state restaurants.

== Reception ==
The restaurant has been included in numerous publications' lists of the best burger restaurants in Los Angeles. In 2017, celebrity chef David Chang suggested that the restaurant should be included on The World's 50 Best Restaurants list.

In 1986, Al's tuna sandwich was recognized by the Los Angeles Times as one of the best tuna sandwich in the city.

Billboard Magazine recommended Cassell's as one of the three places to go after attending the 59th Annual Grammy Awards ceremony instead of going to In-N-Out Burger.

== See also ==
- List of hamburger restaurants
