= Culzean Castle =

Castle in Scotland

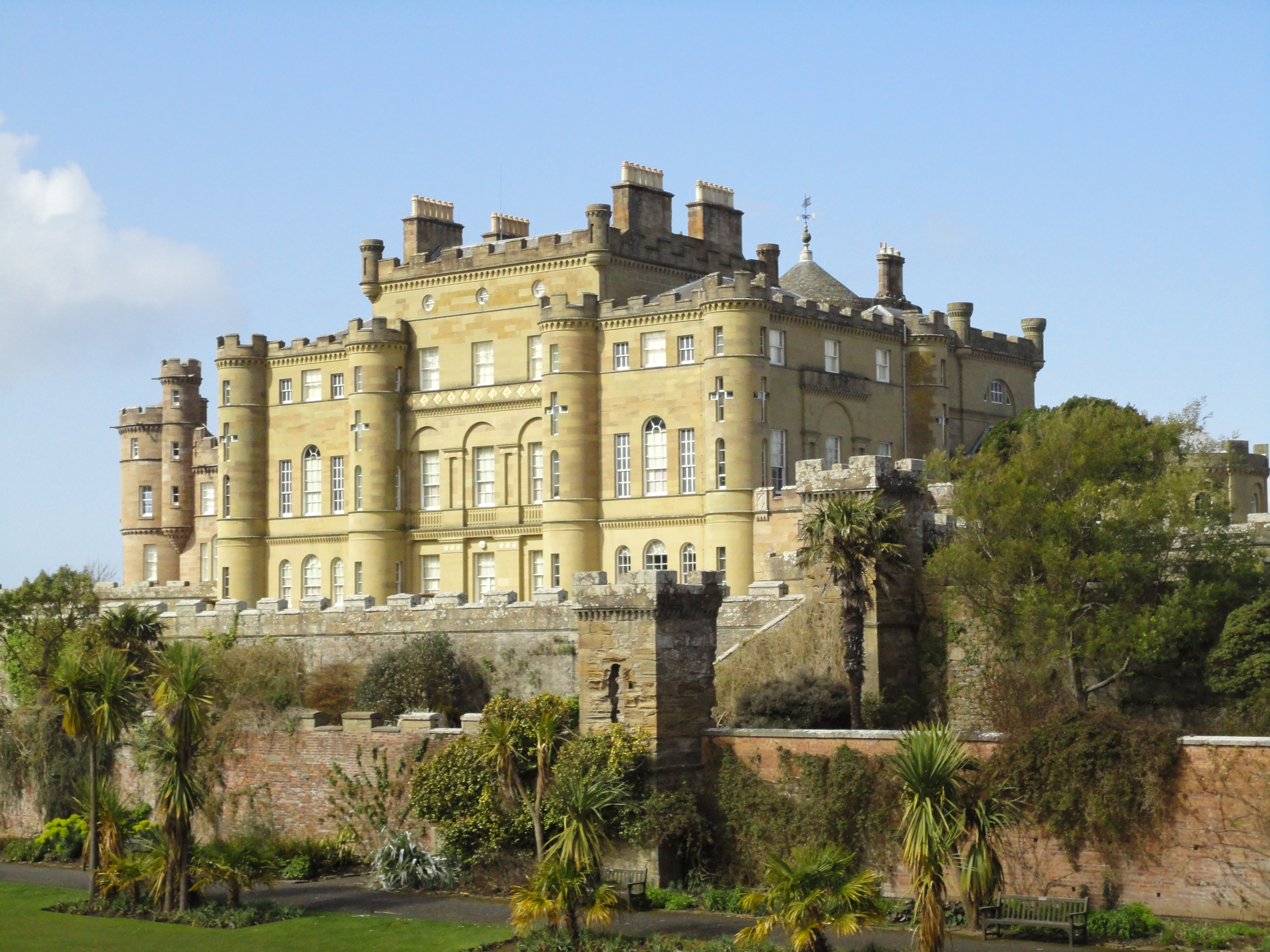

- Location within South Ayrshire
- 55°21′16″N 4°47′22″W
- Location: Maybole, South Ayrshire
- OS grid reference: NS 23276 10281

History
- Built: 1777–1792

Site notes
- Area: 240 acres (97 ha)
- Architect: Robert Adam
- Owner: National Trust for Scotland

Inventory of Gardens and Designed Landscapes in Scotland
- Official name: Culzean Castle
- Designated: 1 July 1987
- Reference no.: GDL00124

Culzean Castle (/kʌˈleɪn/ kul-AYN, see yogh; Scots: Culzean, Culȝean, Colean) is a castle overlooking the Firth of Clyde, near Maybole, Carrick, in South Ayrshire, on the west coast of Scotland. It is the former home of the Marquess of Ailsa, the chief of Clan Kennedy, but is now owned by the National Trust for Scotland. The clifftop castle lies within the 240 acres (97 ha) Culzean Castle Country Park, which also contains a walled garden, other estate buildings that are open to the public, shops and cafés, and a playground. The castle is open to the public throughout the summer, and the wider estate is open all year.

There are eight self-catering properties available for holiday rental within the country park, include the Brewhouse Flat which is located within the castle itself. The castle can also be hired for private events.

From 1972 until 2015, an illustration of the castle was featured on the reverse side of five pound notes issued by the Royal Bank of Scotland.

== History ==
Culzean Castle was constructed as an L-plan castle by order of the 10th Earl of Cassillis. He instructed the architect Robert Adam to rebuild a previous, but more basic, structure into a fine country house to be the seat of his earldom. The castle was built in stages between 1777 and 1792. It incorporates a large drum tower with a circular saloon inside (which overlooks the sea), a grand oval staircase and a suite of well-appointed apartments.

The castle was the venue, on 14 November 1817, when the 1st Marquess of Ailsa's daughter, Margaret Radclyffe Livingstone Eyre, married Thomas, Viscount Kynnaird. Margaret would become a noted philanthropist.

In 1945, the Kennedy family gave the castle and its grounds to the National Trust for Scotland (thus avoiding inheritance tax). In doing so, they stipulated that the apartment at the top of the castle be given to General of the Army Dwight D. Eisenhower in recognition of his role as Supreme Commander of the Allied Forces in Europe during the Second World War. The General first visited Culzean Castle in 1946 and stayed there four times, including once while President of the United States.

The Ayrshire (Earl of Carrick's Own) Yeomanry, a British Yeomanry cavalry regiment, was formed by the Earl of Cassillis at Culzean Castle in about 1794. On 24 June 1961, the regiment returned to the castle to be presented with its first guidon by General Sir Horatius Murray, KBE, CB, DSO.

The castle re-opened in April 2011 after a refurbishment funded by a gift in the will of American millionaire William Lindsay to the National Trust for Scotland. Lindsay, who had never visited Scotland, requested that a significant portion of his $4 million go towards Culzean. Lindsay was reportedly interested in Eisenhower's holidays at the castle.

Culzean Castle received 334,000 visitors in 2025.

== Features ==
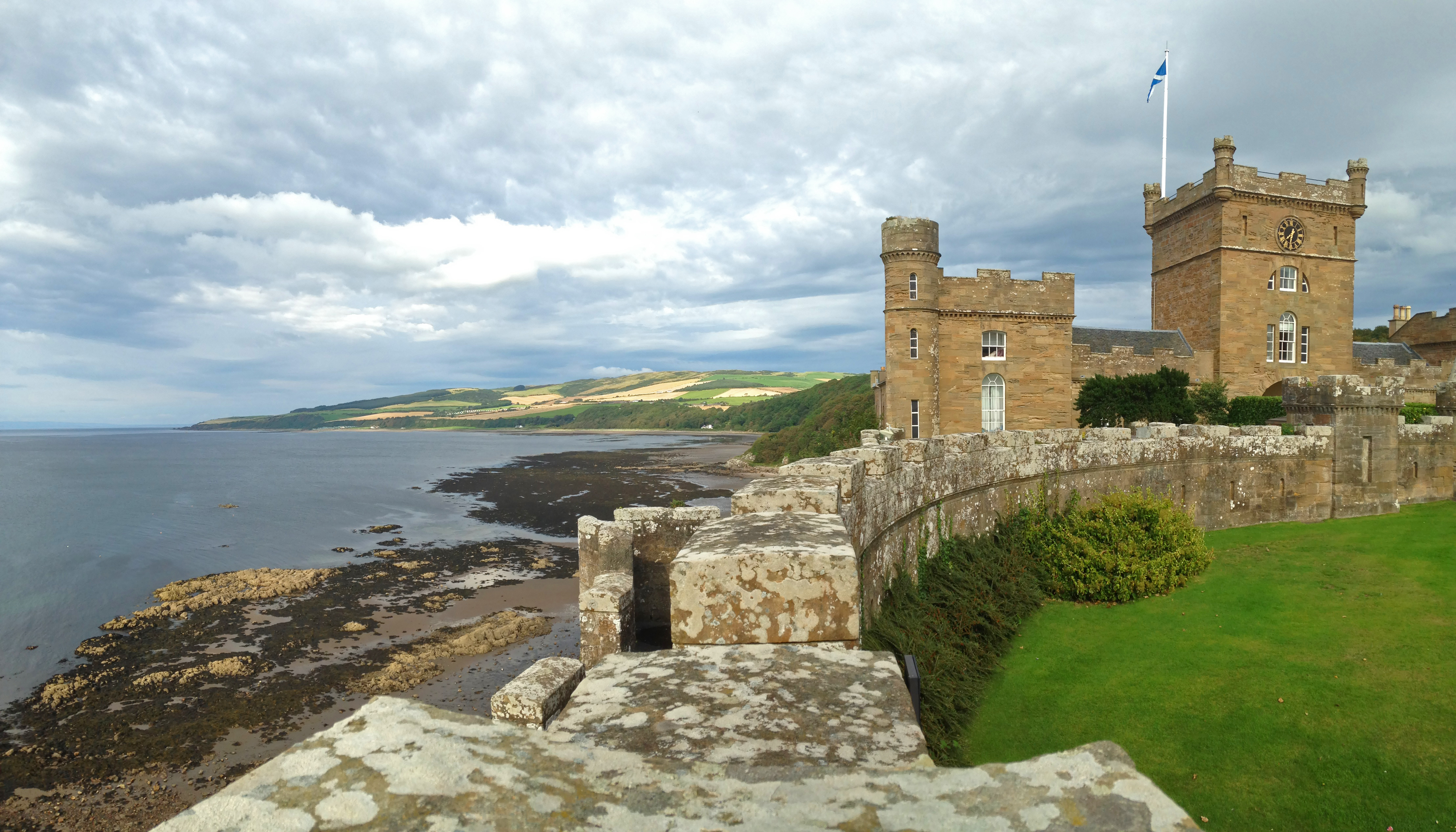
Clock tower's courtyard and shore

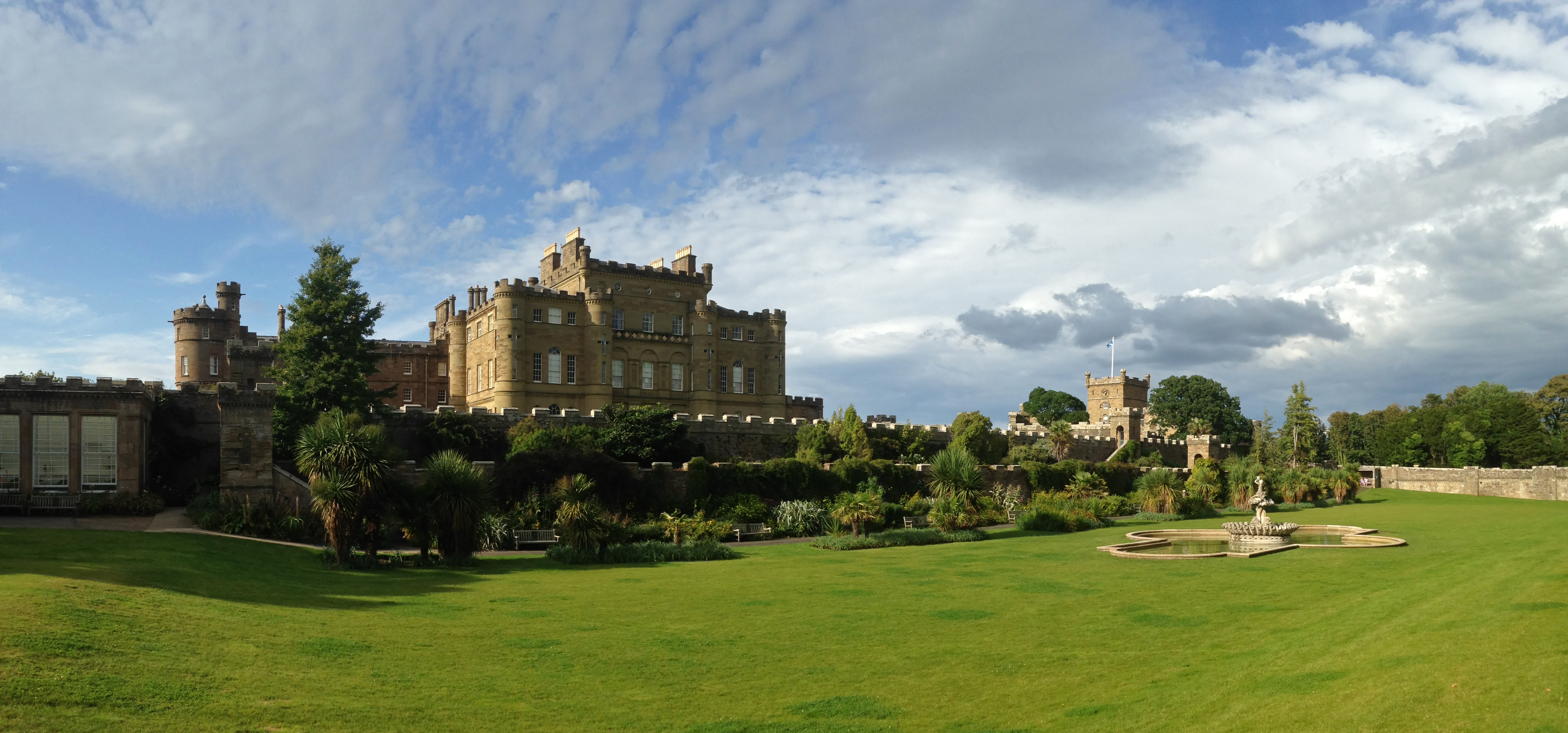
Panoramic view of Culzean Castle main building

The armoury contains a propeller from a plane flown by Leefe Robinson when he shot down a German airship north of London in 1916.

To the north of the castle is a bay containing the Gas House, which provided town gas for the castle up until 1940. This group of buildings consists of the gas manager's house (now containing an exhibition on William Murdoch), the Retort House and the remains of the gasometer.

There are sea caves beneath the castle which are currently not open generally, but are open for tours throughout the summer.

The castle grounds include a walled garden, which is built on the site of the home of a former slave owned by the Kennedy family, Scipio Kennedy.

== Ghosts ==
The castle is reputed to be home to at least seven ghosts, including a piper and a servant girl.

== Film and television appearances ==
Ailsa Craig seen from the Culzean estate

- Culzean Castle is used as the castle of Lord Summerisle (played by Christopher Lee) in the 1973 cult film The Wicker Man. The scenes here were filmed between October and November 1972.
- Culzean Castle featured in the 1997 PBS documentary series Castles of Scotland.
- Culzean Castle and Country Park featured in the 2001 Bollywood film Pyaar Ishq Aur Mohabbat.
- The Most Haunted team led by Yvette Fielding, Karl Beattie and medium Derek Acorah explored Culzean Castle's paranormal stories and reported sightings of ghosts for an episode of the first series, broadcast on Living TV in 2002.
- The BBC TV Coast programme visited in series 2 episode 3 first shown in November 2009.
- Culzean Castle appeared on the programme The Little Couple from TLC, where the family visited the castle on the Series 9 pilot episode in 2016.
- It was the location for two episodes of BBC One’s Antiques Roadshow filmed in 2020 and transmitted in February and April 2021.

== Gallery ==
Culzean castle & gardens
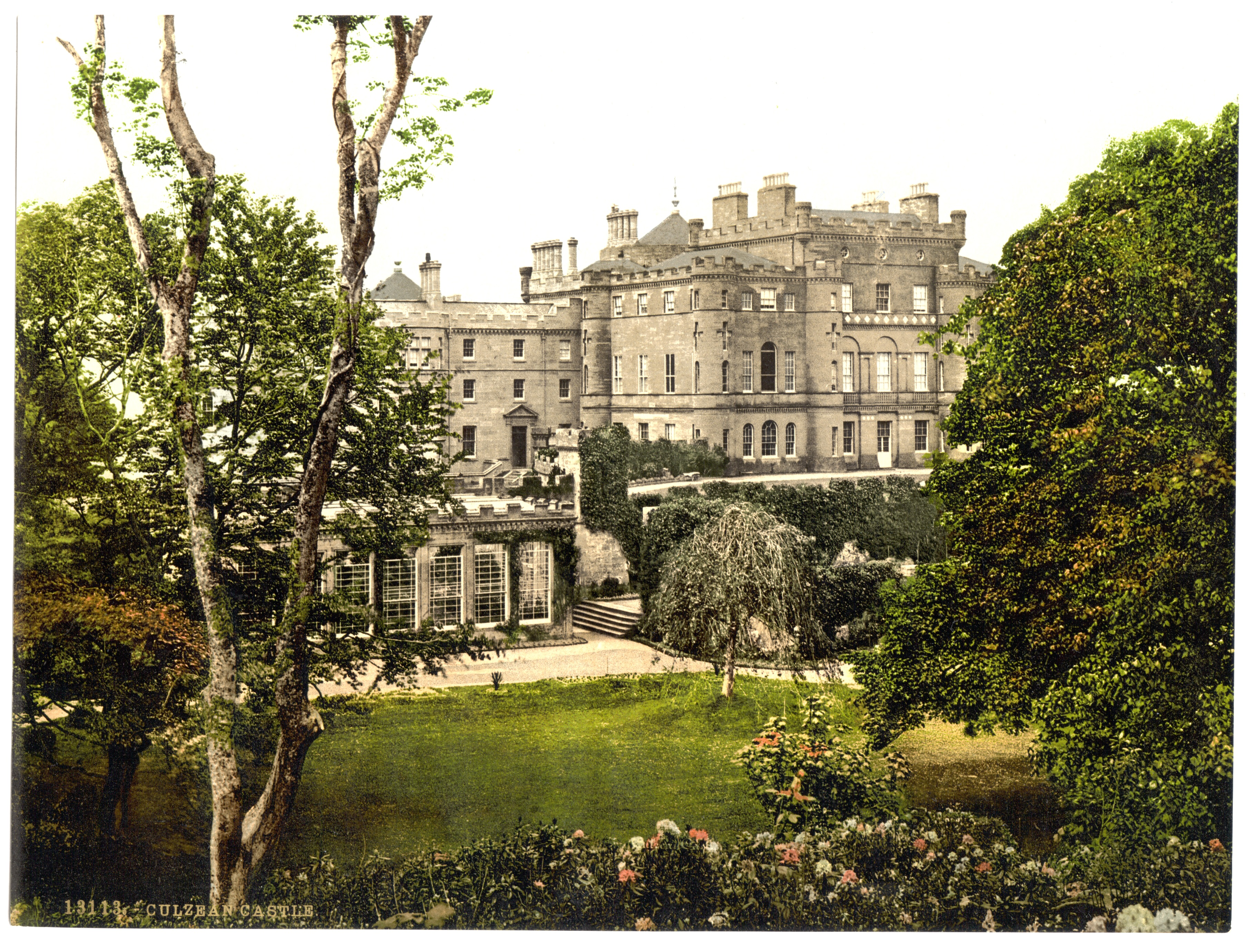
Culzean Castle, 1890s photograph

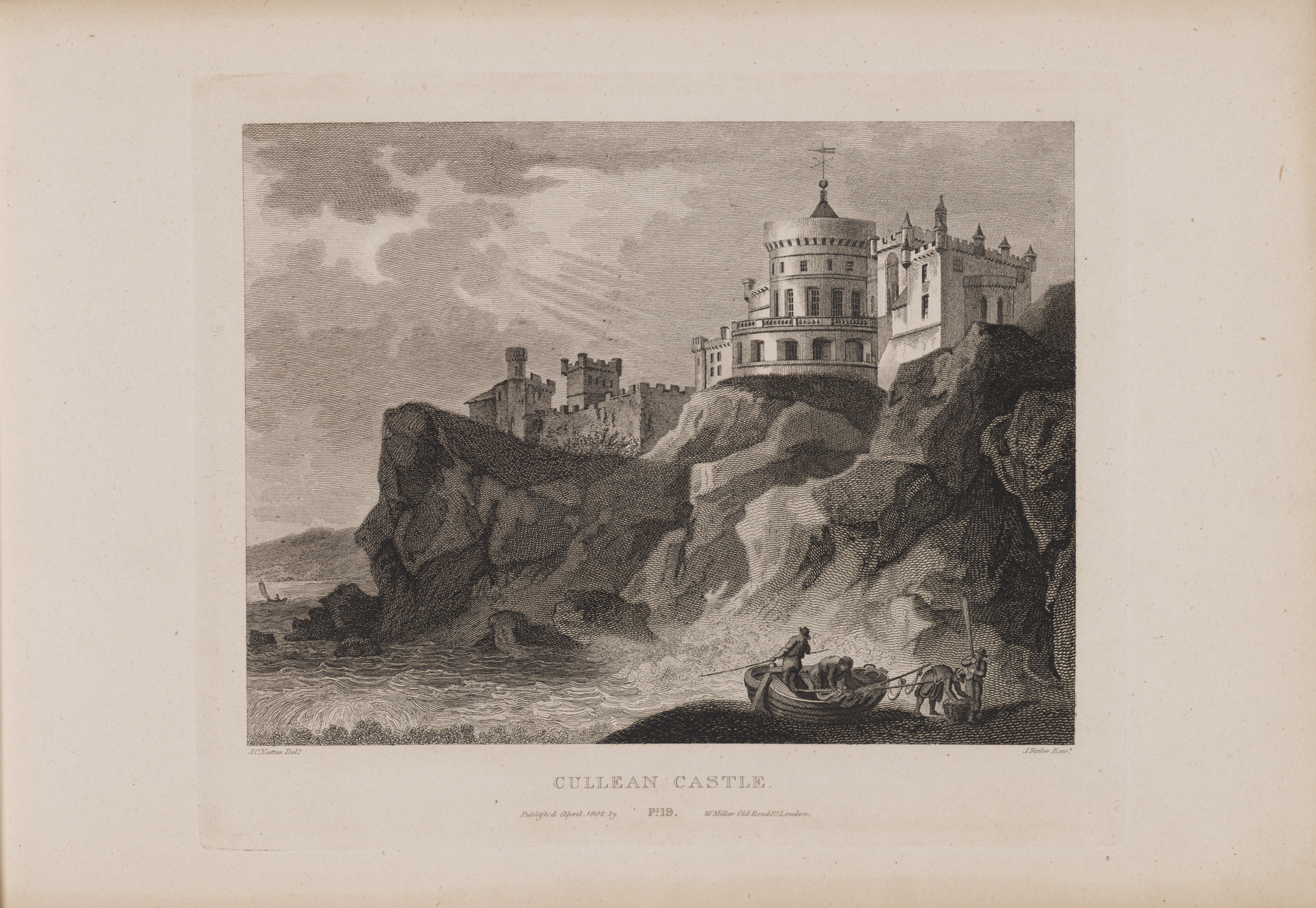
Etching of Culzean Castle by James Fittler from Scotia Depicta, published 1804

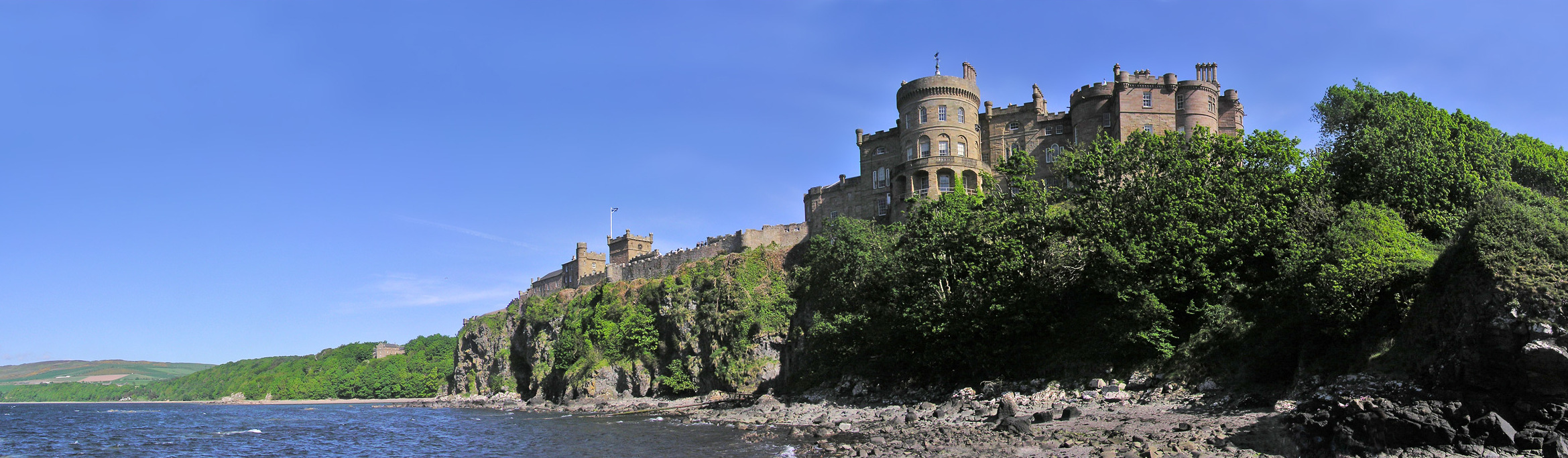
Culzean Castle from the shore

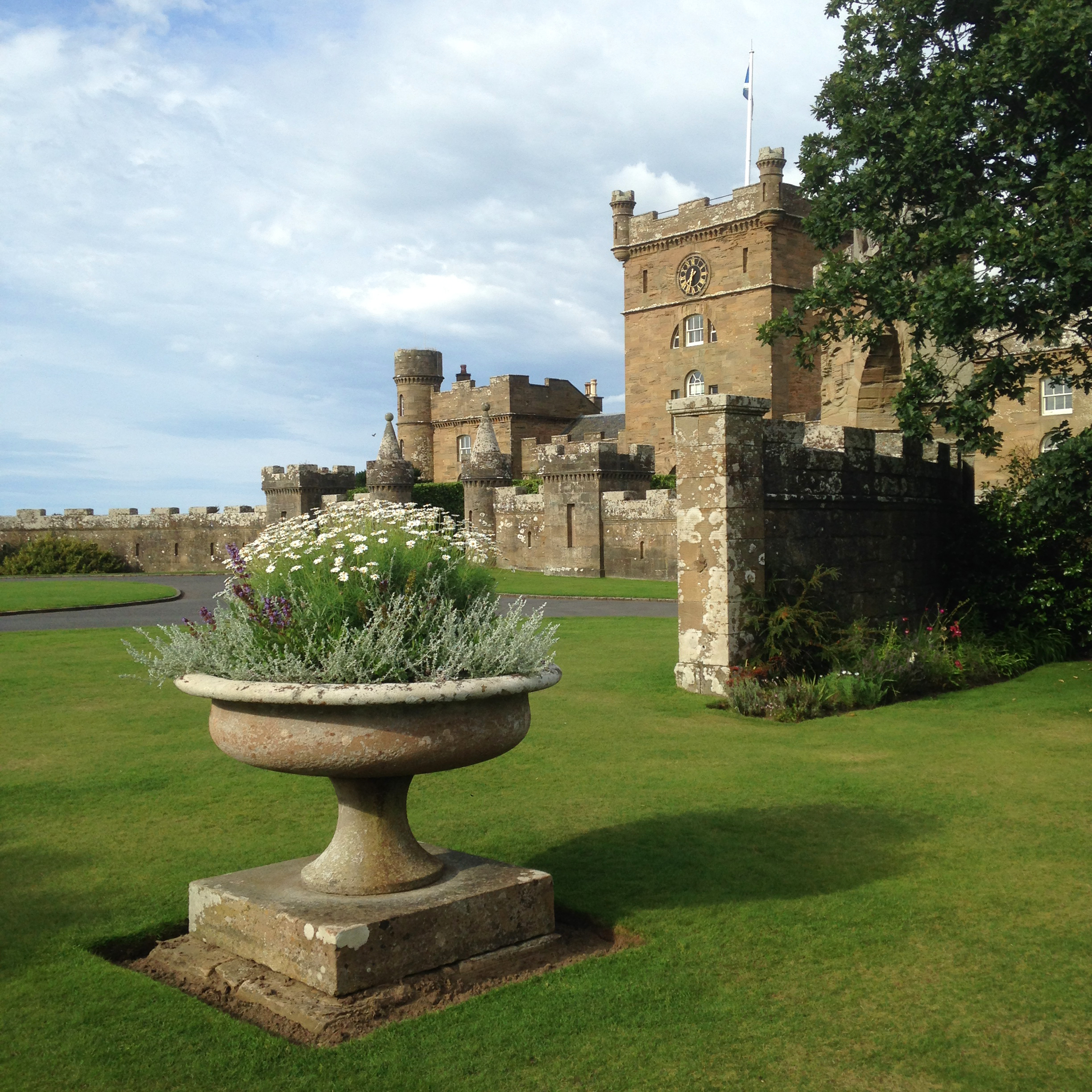
Clock tower's courtyard

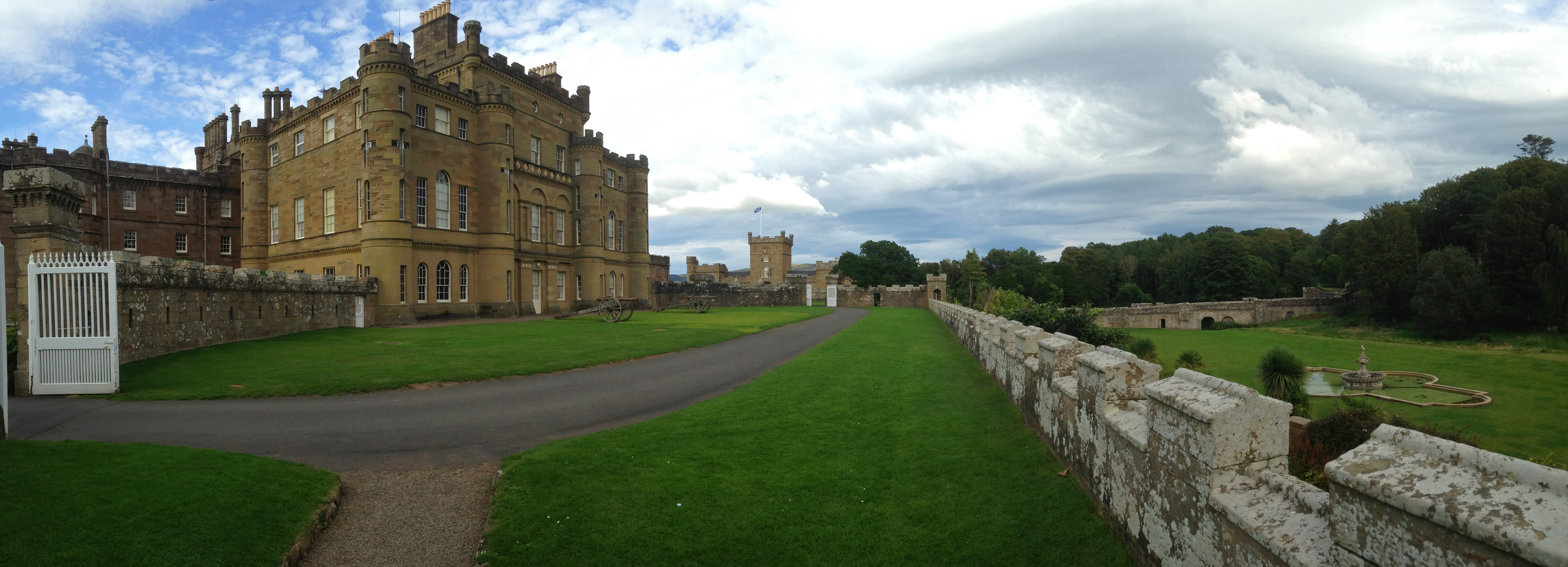
Close panoramic view of Culzean Castle main building, towards Clock tower

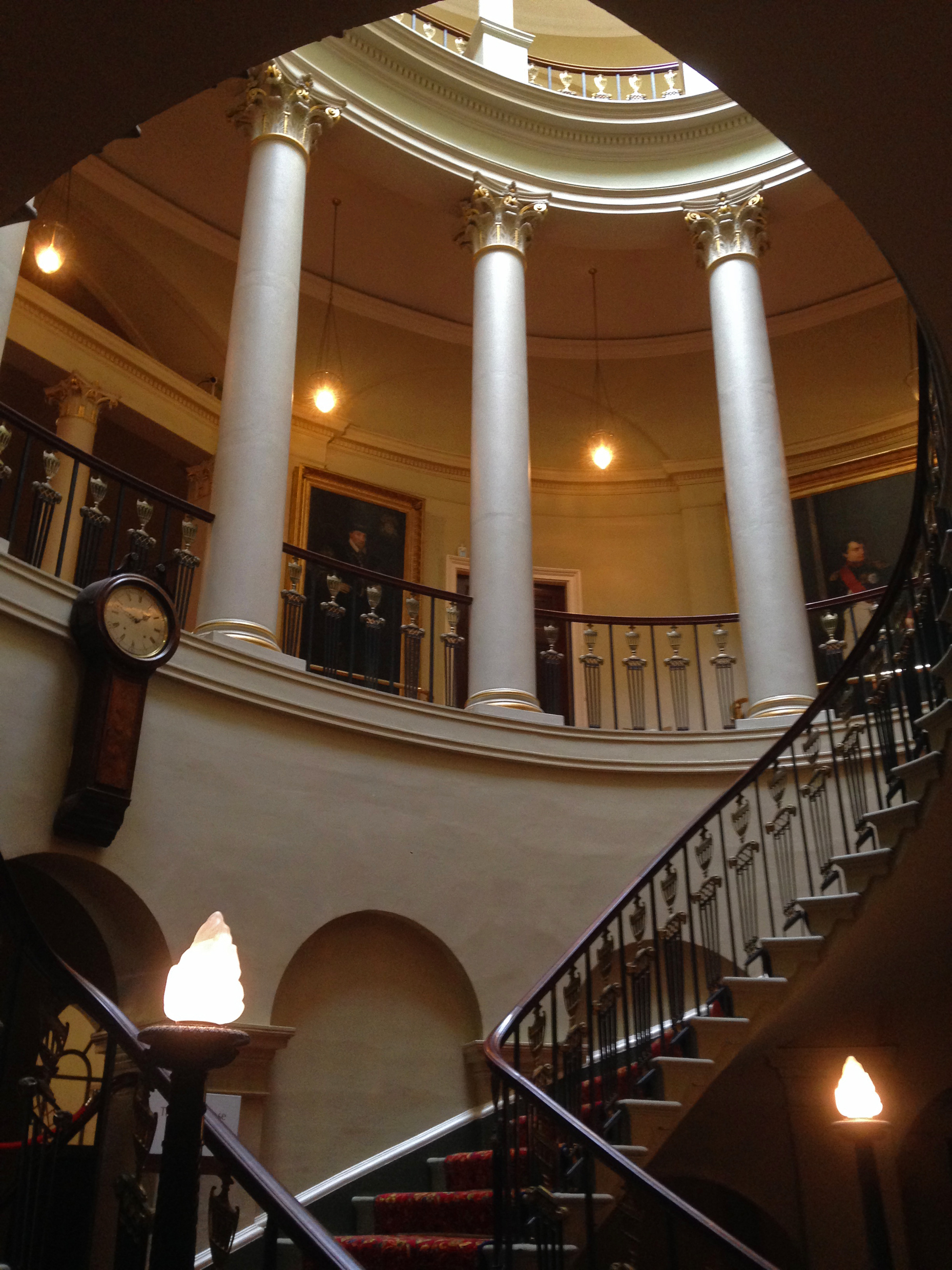
Grand oval staircase by Robert Adam, at Culzean Castle

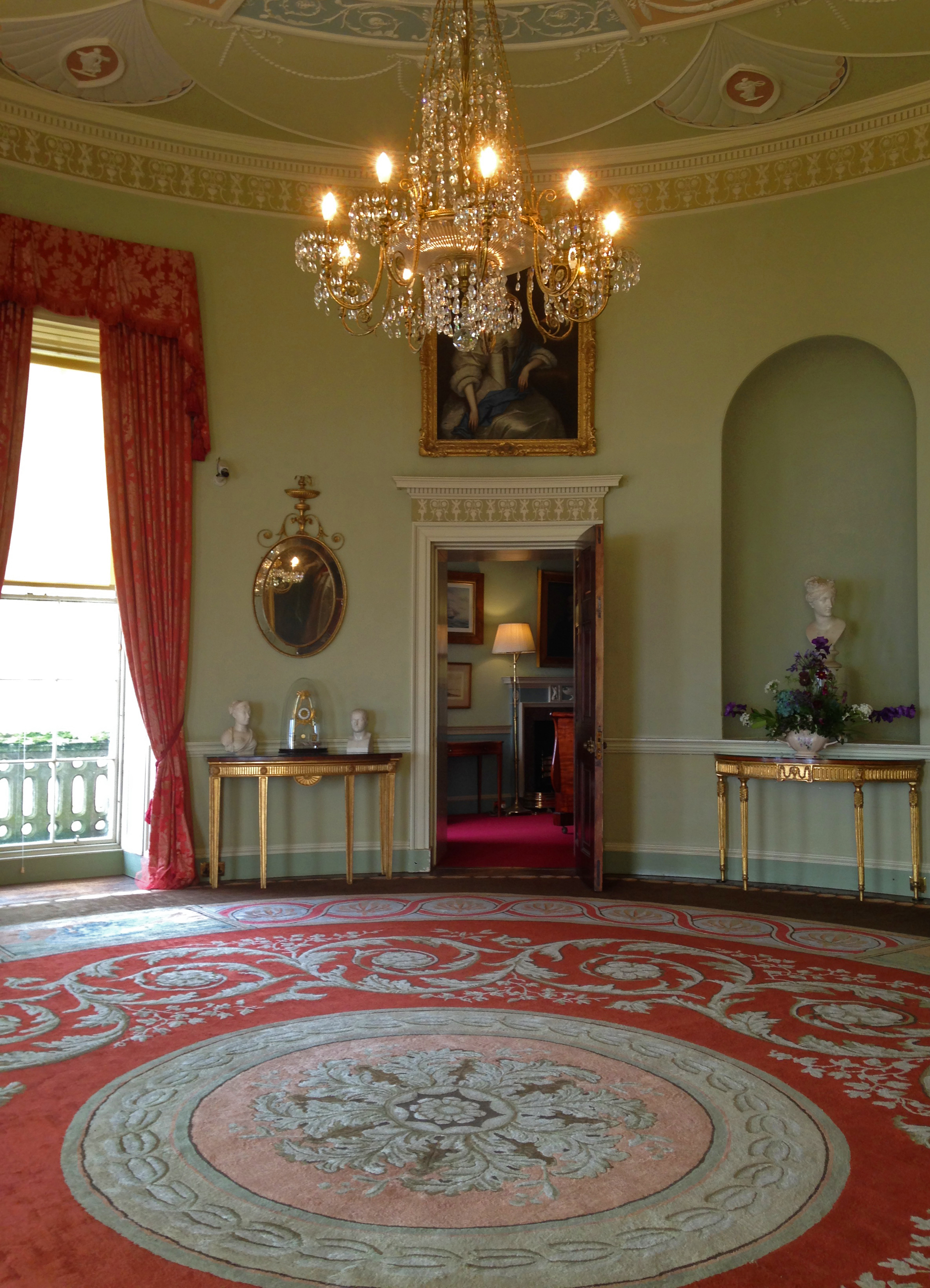
Interior by Robert Adam at Culzean Castle

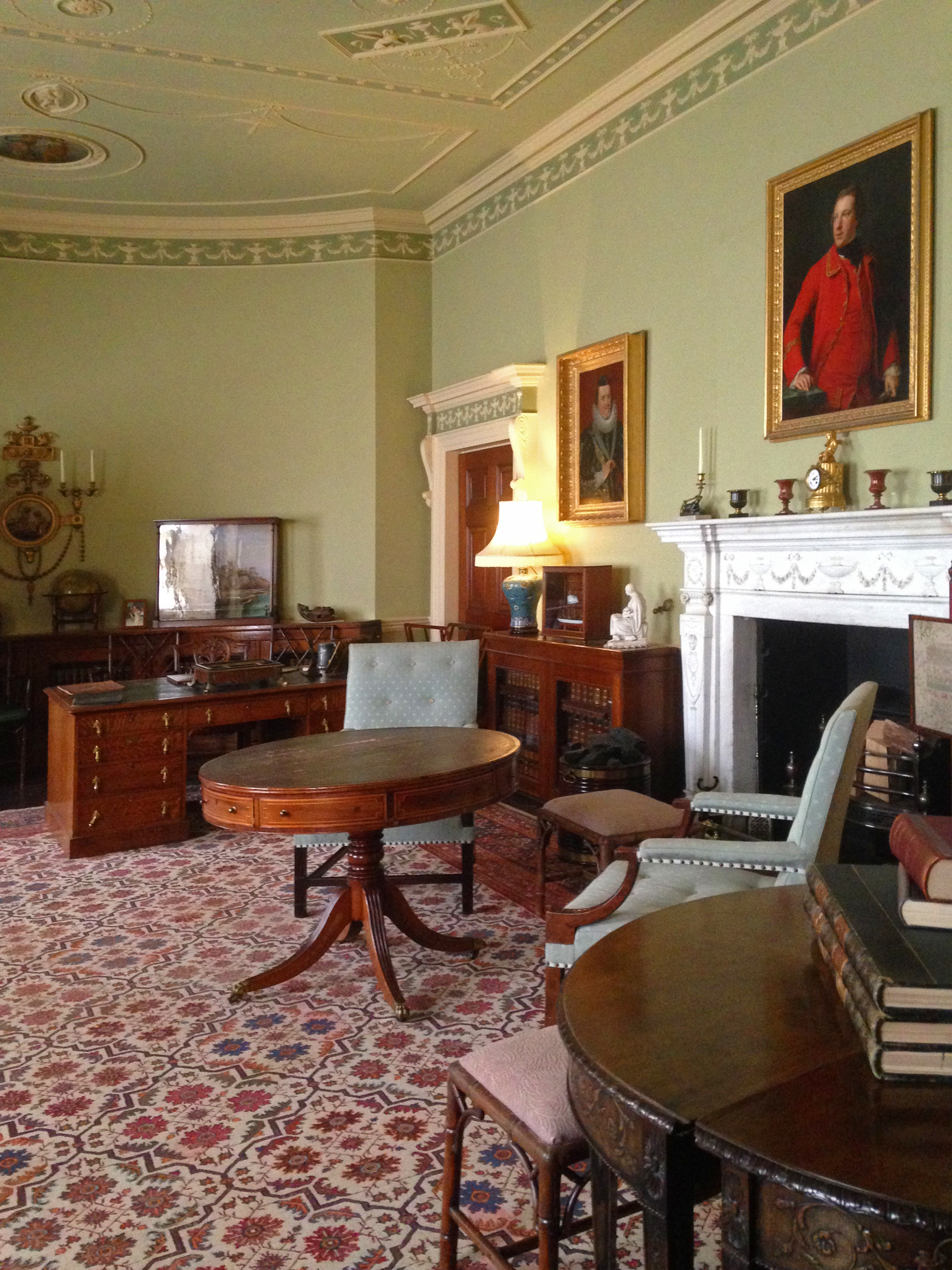
Interior decoration at Culzean Castle

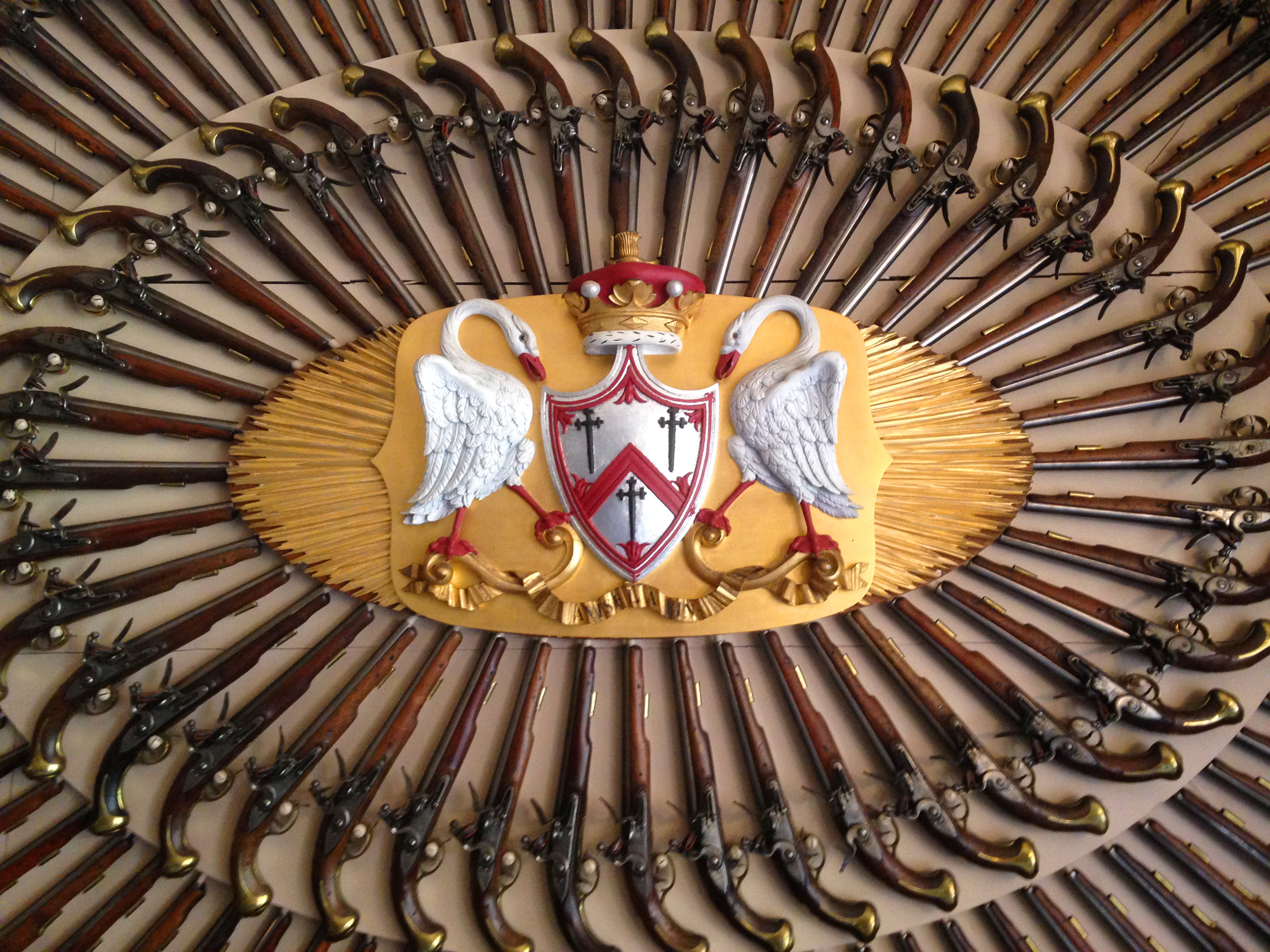
Entrance hall decoration of Culzean Castle, full of pistols

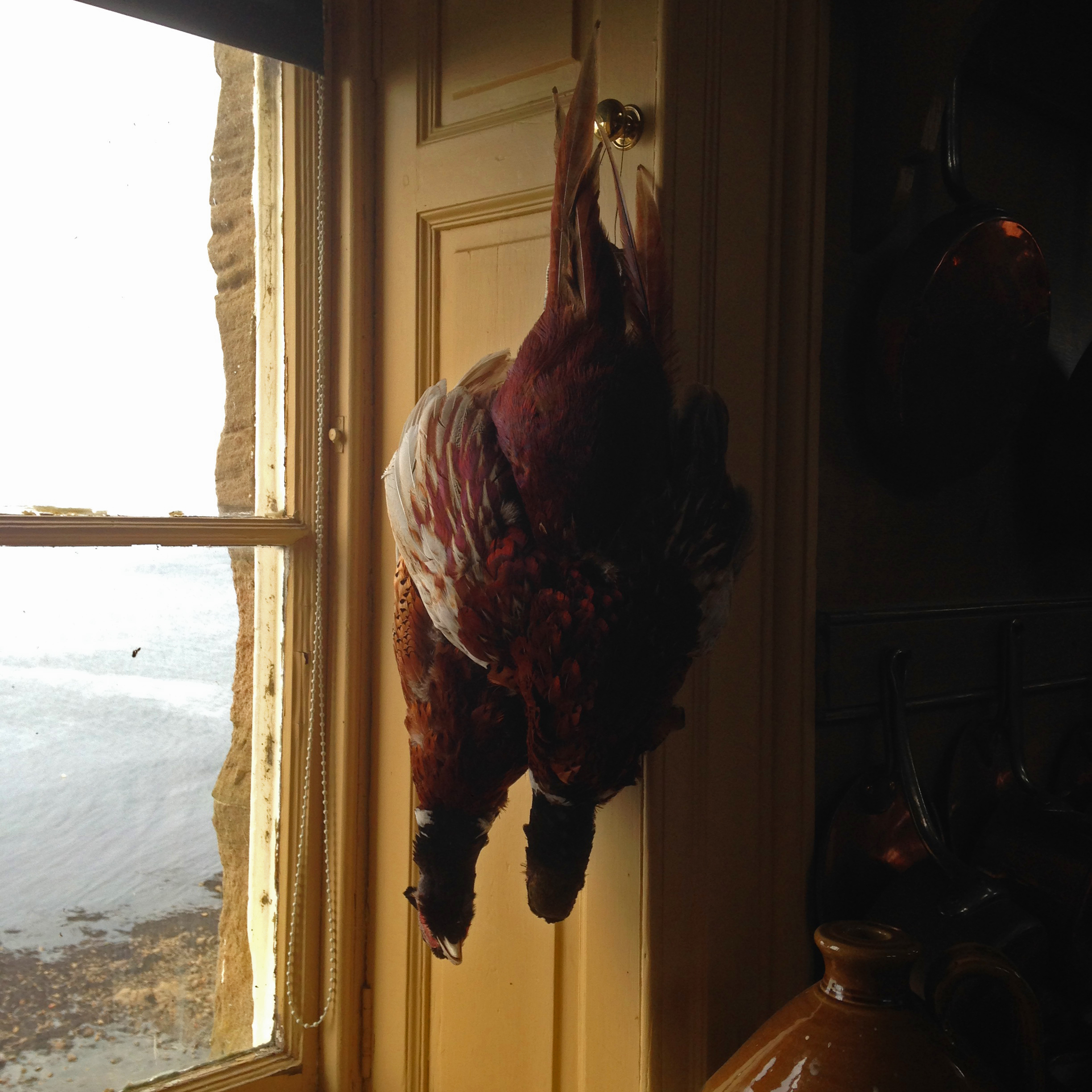
Kitchen decoration at Culzean Castle

Sir John Taylor, 1st Baronet, by Robert Edge Pine, c. 1770s. The portrait was on loan to Culzean Castle from 1982 to 2016. Since 2026, it has been in the private collection of Anthony Watson CBE.

== See also ==
- Banknotes of Scotland (featured on design)
