= Cassell's National Library =

Cassell's National Library was a weekly series issued by Cassell & Company of London, comprising English literature edited by Henry Morley. From 1886 to 1889 it issued 209 weekly volumes. These were sold for 3d. in paper covers and 6d. cloth-bound, roughly equivalent to $4.50 and $9.00 in 2020 US dollars. The paper editions were among the earliest paperbound books in the history of book publishing, and are examples of the "literature for millions" publications begun early in the 19th century.

Morley also edited the monthly series Morley's Universal Library issued by George Routledge & Sons from 1883 to 1888.
