= List of listed buildings in Prestwick, South Ayrshire =

This is a list of listed buildings in the parish of Prestwick in South Ayrshire, Scotland.

== List ==
Name	Location	Date listed	Grid ref. (Note: Sometimes known as OSGB36, the grid reference (where provided) is based on the British national grid reference system used by the Ordnance Survey. • "Guide to National Grid". Ordnance Survey. • "Get-a-map". Ordnance Survey.)	Geo-coordinates	Notes	LB number (Note: Historic Environment Scotland assign a unique alphanumeric identifier to each designated site in Scotland, for listed buildings this always begins with "LB", for example "LB12345".)	Image
76-84 Main Street (Even Nos), Former Broadway Cinema Including Shops				55°29′55″N 4°36′41″W	Category C(S)	49978	Upload Photo
Kingcase, Bruce`S Well And Ruins Of St Ninian`S Hospital				55°29′20″N 4°37′07″W	Category B	40331	Upload Photo
Mercat Cross				55°30′05″N 4°36′40″W	Category A	40328	Upload another image
Ruin Of St. Nicholas' Church And Graveyard, Kirk Street				55°29′46″N 4°36′44″W	Category B	40330	Upload Photo
5 And 7 The Cross				55°30′06″N 4°36′37″W	Category C(S)	51033	Upload Photo
Towans Hotel, Powmill Road				55°30′22″N 4°36′10″W	Category B	40333	Upload Photo
St. Cuthberts Parish Church				55°30′25″N 4°36′12″W	Category B	40327	Upload Photo
Old Burgh Chambers (Now County Council District Office)				55°30′07″N 4°36′38″W	Category B	40329	Upload another image See more images
50 Main Street, Prestwick South Parish Church (Church Of Scotland, Former United Presbyterian)				55°29′58″N 4°36′41″W	Category B	49360	Upload another image See more images
Salt Pan Houses At St Nicholas Golf Course				55°29′26″N 4°37′24″W	Category A	40332	Upload another image

== Key ==
The scheme for classifying buildings in Scotland is:

- Category A: "buildings of national or international importance, either architectural or historic; or fine, little-altered examples of some particular period, style or building type."
- Category B: "buildings of regional or more than local importance; or major examples of some particular period, style or building type, which may have been altered."
- Category C: "buildings of local importance; lesser examples of any period, style, or building type, as originally constructed or moderately altered; and simple traditional buildings which group well with other listed buildings."

In March 2016 there were 47,288 listed buildings in Scotland. Of these, 8% were Category A, and 50% were Category B, with the remaining 42% being Category C.
