= Prestwick Academy =

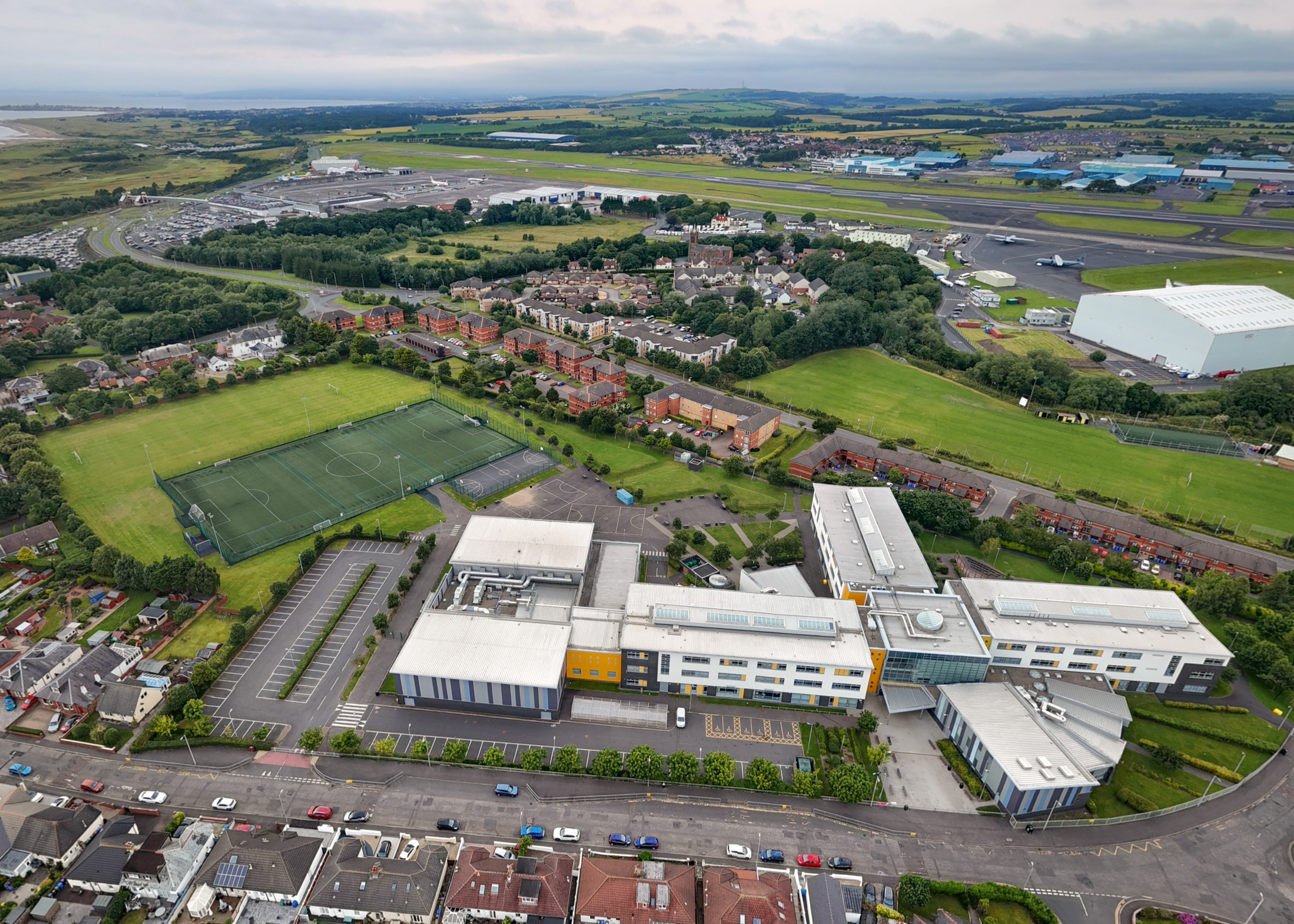
- School badge Prestwick Academy From The Air, July 2026

Location
- Newdykes Road, Prestwick, South Ayrshire, KA9 2LB, Scotland; 55.5029°N 4.6040°W

Information
- Type: State coeducational secondary school
- Motto: Per Vias Rectas
- Established: c.1902
- Authority: South Ayrshire Council
- Head teacher: Oonagh Browne
- Grades: S1–S6
- Gender: Boys and Girls, Co–educational
- Age range: 11–18 1,228 pupils
- Colors: S1-S4: S5: S6:
- Affiliation: Glenburn Primary School, Heathfield Primary School, Kingcase Primary School, Monkton Primary School and Symington Primary School
- Website: Prestwick Academy

Prestwick Academy (Scottish Gaelic: Acadamaidh Prestwick) is an 11–18 non-denominational secondary school in the town of Prestwick, South Ayrshire in Scotland. The school is the responsibility of South Ayrshire Council, with its current head teacher Oonagh Browne having overall responsibility for the school's day–to–day running. With a pupil roll of 1,201 in 2023–2024, it is the second-largest secondary school in South Ayrshire by pupil intake. The motto of Prestwick Academy is Per Vias Rectas, Latin for By Straight Paths.

Prestwick Academy serves the town of Prestwick, part of North Ayr, and the villages of Symington and Monkton. There are five cluster primary schools: Glenburn, Heathfield, Kingcase, Monkton and Symington.

== History ==
=== Origins and establishment ===
Prestwick Academy was opened in 1902 as a primary school, with one building, known as 'Block 1' after the school expanded. The building was extended in 1910 and 1913 to provide more classrooms as the town of Prestwick developed. At the time, all secondary school children in the area had to attend Ayr Academy for further education.

The school went through major expansion to accommodate secondary pupils in the 1960s and more buildings were constructed with primary children being moved into Block 7. For students in the 1950s, those wishing to take exams had to go to Ayr Academy. The school leaving age was raised to 15. To cope with this expansion, Block 7 was taken over by the secondary school and primary students were moved to other schools.

=== Closure of primary department ===
In 1972, Kingcase Primary was opened and Prestwick Academy's primary department was closed down. The school leaving age was raised to 16 which again caused overcrowding. Various huts in the school were replaced by the building of 5 new blocks between 1972 and 1974. The new buildings comprised; a new single storey Science building (Block 6); an Art/Technical/Business Studies Building (Block 5); a new Math/Home Economics/Modern Languages and Music building (Block 3) and Offices, Staffroom, Assembly Hall (Block 4) and two Gymnasiums, a Games hall and Community Suite (Block 2).

=== Recent history ===
As part of the Scottish Executive's Public-Private Partnership policy, it was announced that Prestwick Academy would be rebuilt. The new building for Prestwick Academy is a first-generation PPP school and was officially opened in October 2009. Facilities management is undertaken by MITIE who are charged with overseeing the quality and maintenance of the accommodation.

Construction started in 2006 with Block 7 (Geography, Religious Studies, Behaviour Support, and the Dining Hall) being demolished to make room for the new building. All of the new school, apart from the PE facilities, opened for pupils in October 2008. The new Prestwick Academy is a modern, open-spaced building built on three floors.

The new building is designed as follows.

1. Home Economics, Design & Technology, Physical Education, Mathematics, Music, Pupil Support, School Admin.
2. English, Modern Languages, Business Education, History & Modern Studies, Geography, Religious Studies.
3. Art & Design, Biology, Chemistry, Physics, Computing.

In April 2025, it was announced that Oonagh Browne, head teacher at Queen Margaret Academy in Ayr would be taking up the post of head teacher at Prestwick Academy in August 2025.

== School demographics ==
The new building the day before its opening to pupils

At the beginning of academy session 2022/23, the school roll at Prestwick Academy stood at 1,228 pupils enrolled, a decrease from the previous years due to a smaller S1 cohort. The number of teaching staff on census day in September 2022 was 83.7 (full-time equivalent), and the percentage of young people in receipt of free school meals stood at 13%, which was a slight increase from the previous year.

In relation to the Scottish Index of Multiple Deprivation (SIMD), 7% of Prestwick Academy pupils live in the most deprived areas (SIMD 1-2), 19% live in the least deprived areas (SIMD 9-10), and 74% in the middle 60% (SIMD 3-8). During session 2022/23 there were 22 care experienced young people attending Prestwick Academy. Attendance stood at 87% as of 2022–2023, which was in line with the previous session. Prestwick Academy exclusion figures at the end of the 2021–2022 session were 34 per 1000 pupils, which demonstrated a decrease from the previous session.

== Associated Primary Schools ==
Primary School	Head Teacher
Glenburn Primary School	Gaynor Hartley
Symington Primary School	Maria Galt
Heathfield Primary School	Gaenor Hardy
Kingcase Primary School	Ryan Delaney
Monkton Primary School	Karen Miller

== Notable former pupils ==
- Peter Howson – Internationally acclaimed artist.
- Laura Macdonald – Saxophonist, recording artist & former co-director National Youth Jazz Orchestra.
- Ian Welsh – Chair of Borderline Theatre Company and the Scottish Advisory Committee of the Voluntary Sector National Training Organisation, a board member of Scottish Enterprise Ayrshire, Kilmarnock College, the LIFE project in Drumchapel, the Space Place in Prestwick, and a Director of the Glaisnock House Trust.
- Drew Galloway – Professional wrestler who performs under the alias of 'Drew McIntyre'.
- The MacDonald Brothers – Recording artists & appeared on The X Factor
- James Forrest – First Team Celtic Football Club Player
- Simon Neil – Guitarist and lead vocalist of Biffy Clyro
- Ian Young – Guinness World Record Holder London Marathon
- Alan Forrest – Footballer for Ayr United F.C.

== See also ==
- South Ayrshire Council; the local authority responsible for Prestwick Academy
- Education Scotland; the executive agency of the Scottish Government responsible for school inspections
