= Tsia =

Tsia or TSIA may refer to:

- Chokha or tsia, a traditional woolen coat of the peoples of the Caucasus
- Xie (surname), a Chinese surname sometimes romanised as Tsia
- Tsia language, a Papuan language spoken in Morabe Province, Papua New Guinea
- 4105 Tsia, a minor planet named for the Zia people
- The Scottish International Airshow, an annual air show founded in 2014
- Tsia Creek, a tributary of the Liard River of North America
- Tsia River, in Kolkheti National Park in the country of Georgia

== See also ==
- Zia people (New Mexico), a tribe of the indigenous Keres Pueblo peoples
- Tsai, a surname
- Stia, Tuscany, Italy
