= Shaw Monument =

Coordinates: 55.50158°N 4.585689°W

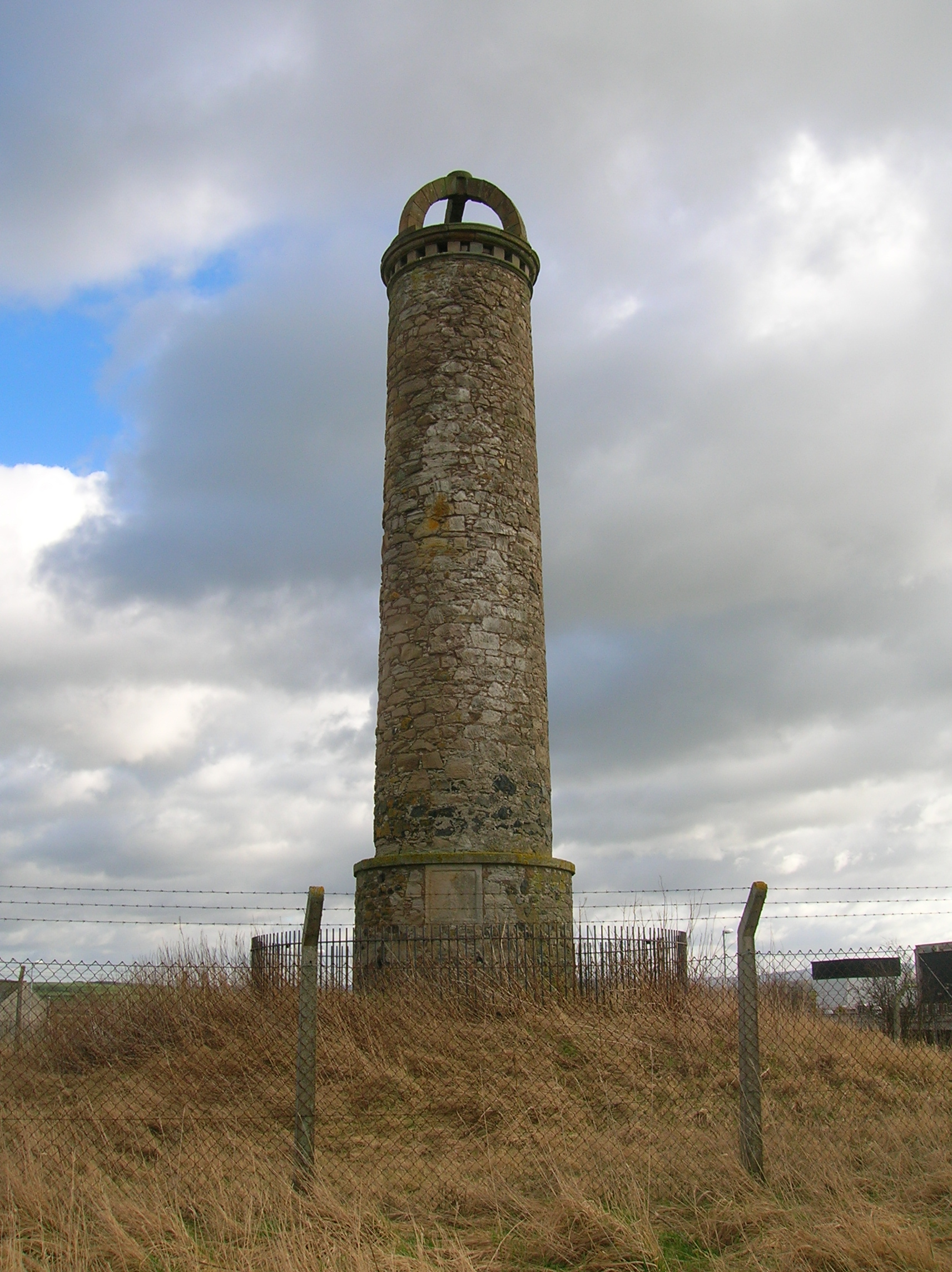
- The Shaw Monument

- Location within South Ayrshire

General information
- Type: Tower
- Location: Prestwick, South Ayrshire, Scotland, Prestwick, Scotland
- Completed: prior to 1775
- Client: Laird of Shaw

Height
- Height: 20 metres (66 ft)

Technical details
- Structural system: Mortared rubble masonry

Listed Building – Category B
- Designated: 1971
- Reference no.: LB994

The Shaw Monument is an 18th-century structure that has been interpreted as a folly and stands about 1 mile East of Prestwick, overlooking Prestwick Airport in South Ayrshire, Scotland.

== History ==
The Shaw Monument, sometimes known as 'Shaw Tower', located on rising ground (NS 36778 26122) near the Prestwick Airport Control Tower, was built at some point prior to 1775 by the then laird of Shaw, a keen falconer, in order that he could follow the sport from its top in his old age when he was no longer able to join on horseback. A faint portrait or simulacrum of a man in profile holding a falcon on a panel at the base of the tower may support this theory or may have given rise to it. The tower is a category B listed building.

The low lying 'Lands of Shaw' were clearly visible from the tower given its elevated and prominent location, in addition the 1811 map by Aiton (illustrated in the text) shows that two small lochs were once located nearby and would have been a source for waterfowl for the birds of prey to hunt within sight of the tower.

It has been suggested that Richard Oswald of Auchincruive, who acquired the Prestwickshaws estate in 1764, built the tower for his wife Mary Ramsay who was very keen on fox hunting and that when she became too elderly to ride, the tower allowed her to view the chase in comfort and without undue physical exertion. This story has obvious links with the old laird of Shaw version. The Reverend Kirkwood Hewat in the 1890s recorded that the Estate Factor's opinion was that the tower had been built before the time of the Oswalds ownership of Auchicruive.

Hunting was also a spectator sport and castles such as Turnberry had a D-shaped tower set in a prominent position that may have acted as a observation tower for family, friends and visitors to observe hunting taking place in the surrounding park.

=== The Boswell Monument ===
Near Portlethen in Aberdeenshire stands the 1860 memorial to John Irvine-Boswell, the Laird of Kincausie, that bears a strong resemblance to the Shaw Monument, including a crown at the top. This memorial to him was built by Margaret, his widow and on the side is a granite plaque that reads "He lived to transform the natural barrenness of the estate into luxuriant fertility."

=== Construction ===
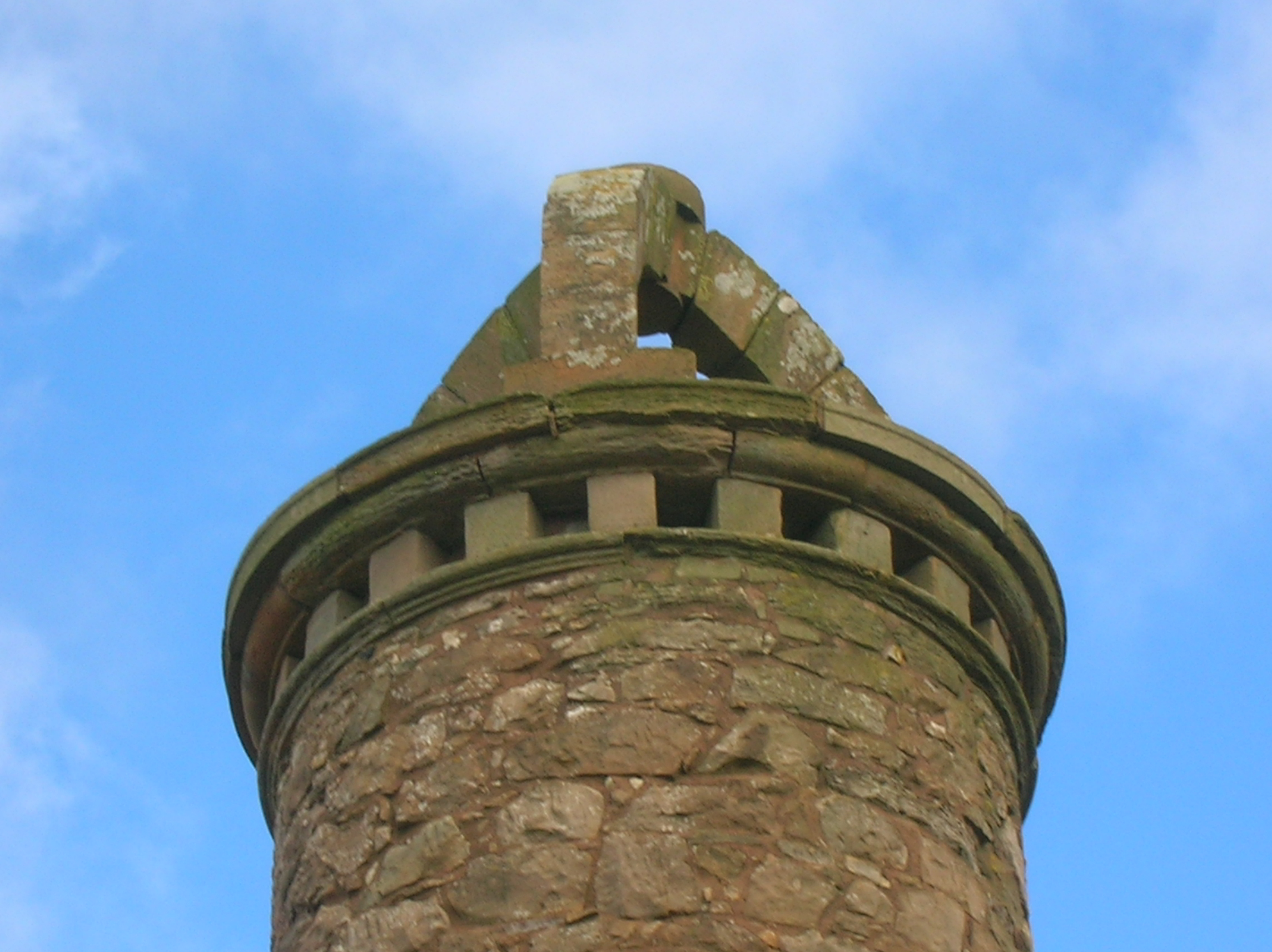
Details of the Shaw Monument top.

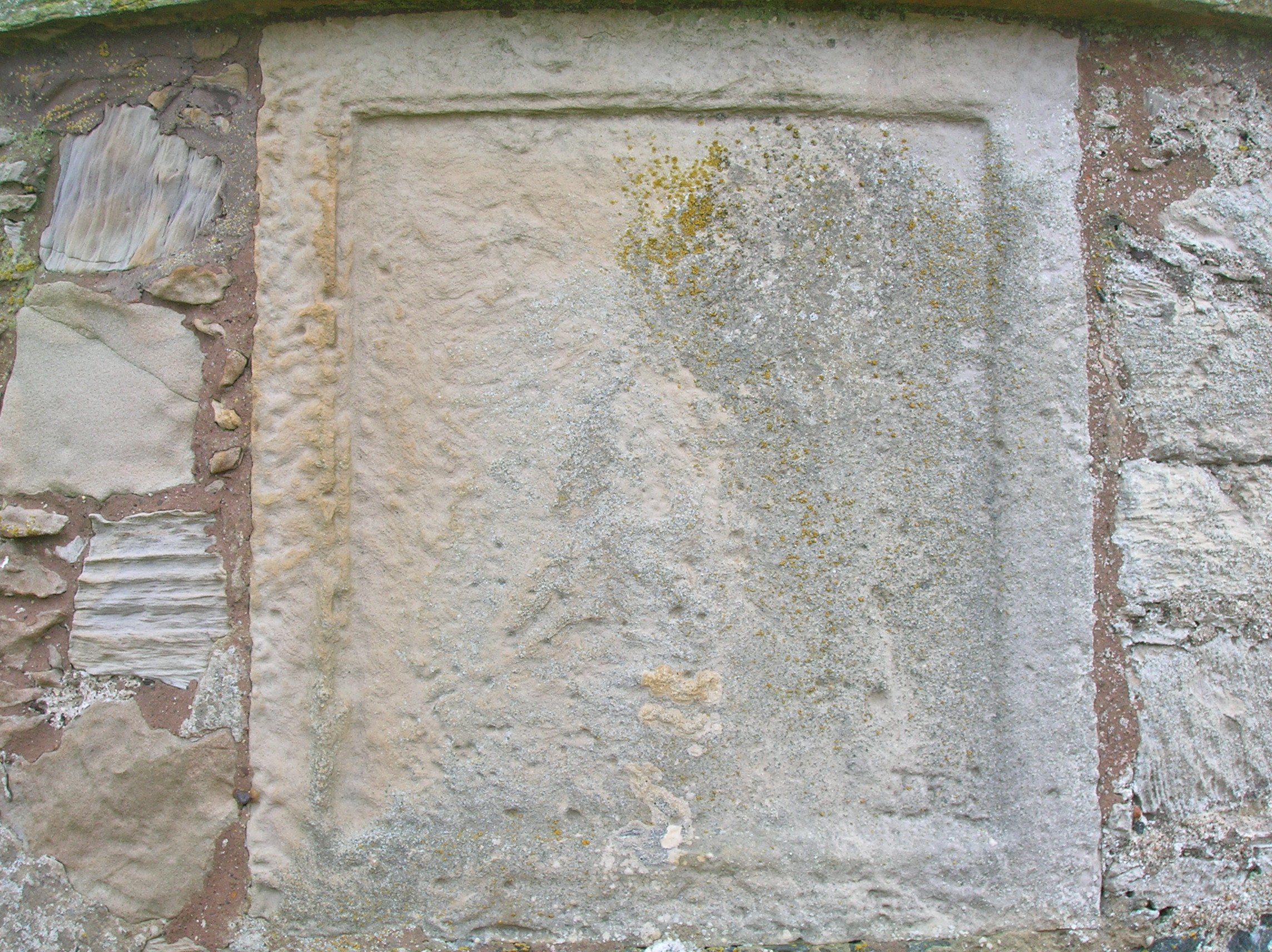
Panel with worn image

The tower is round, around 50 ft or 20m high, and is built of well mortared rubble masonry, typical of 18th century follies. The internal spiral staircase is in poor condition. The tower is capped by a 'crown-like' top and originally had a viewing platform. The door was blocked up in the 1930s because of the poor state of the staircase. No door is now present, however the monument is doubly enclosed within railings and a fence.

The tower has a coped cylindrical base, with a doorway to the East, flanked by a barred window opening and an infilled opening; the shaft of the tower is stepped in from the base and three vertically aligned windows sit above the doorway; a coped cornice lies over a well machicolated eaves course. A very worn panel to the west appears to have a faint image of a man holding a bird of prey.

In the 1970s the tower was extensively repaired thanks to the owners of the nearby aero-engineering factory.

The monument is shown on OS maps as standing on the line of a hedge until quite recently without any obvious access lane or footpath marked. There is a path to the monument access from the main road.

=== Cartography ===
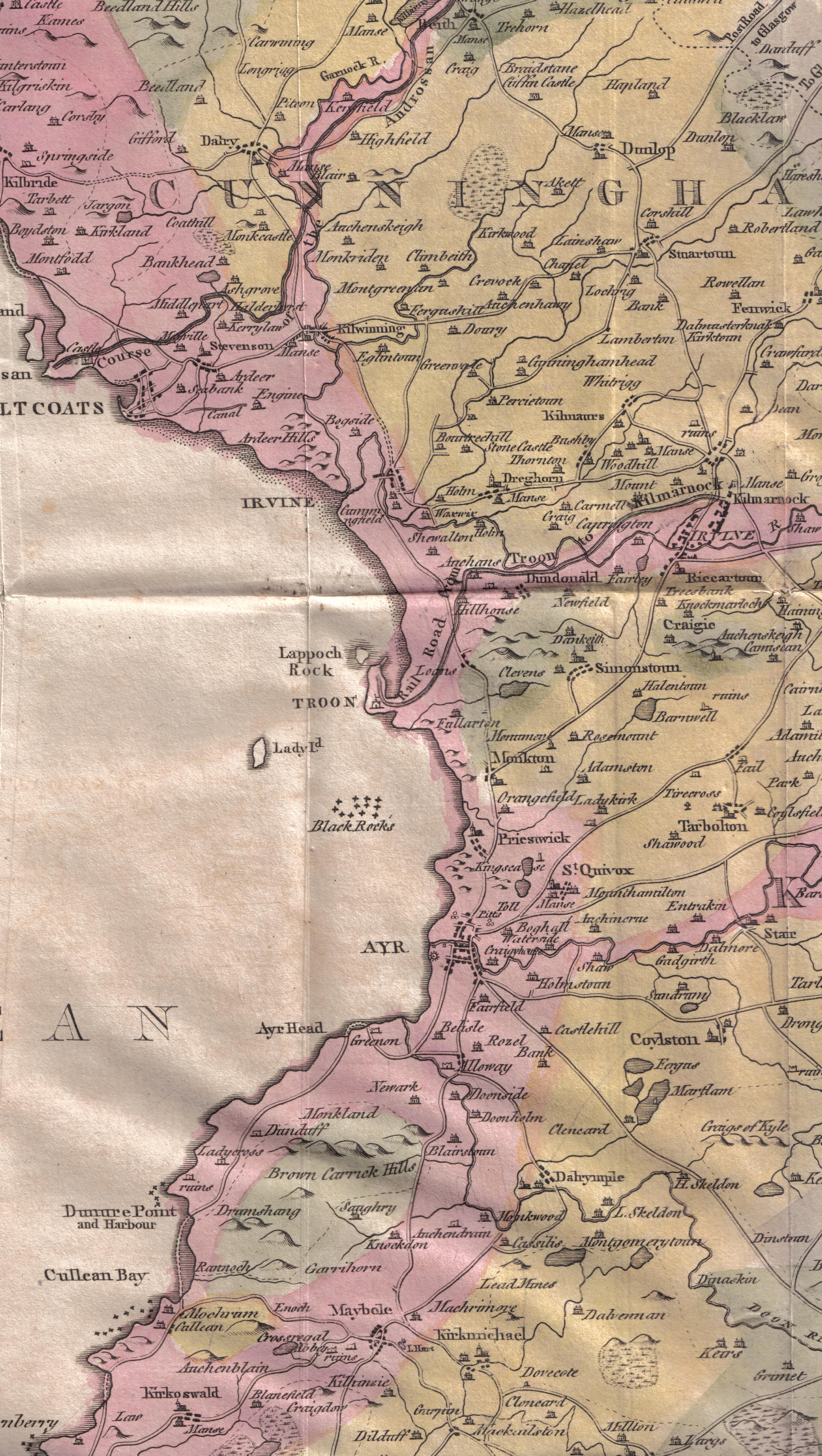
Aitons's 1811 showing Shaw's Tower near two small lochs.

Aiton's map of 1811 shows the tower close to two small lochs, long since drained. Thomson's map of 1832 marks 'Shaw Monument' clearly as a locally significant structure. Armstrong's Map of 1775 shows, but does not name the monument. Johnson's map of 1828 clearly marks 'Shaw's Monument'.

== The Lands of Prestwickshaws ==
These lands were first recorded in 1475; a mill was present at the site. The first Lairds of Prestwickshaw were Thomas Somirwell in 1562 and in 1599 James Somervell, was heir to 'Prestwickschaws' as grandson of John Somervell of Cambusnethan. Adam Stewart held the lands in 1597 and in 1613 by William Wallace, a Burgess of Ayr. 1616 saw John Stewart holding Prestwickshaws and other nearby properties. Circa 1677 James Wallace and his wife Anna Kennedy were in residence with their son James.

Huw Montgomerie of Eglinton obtained the lands upon the death of James Wallace and later James's son, Robert Wallace, purchased the lands back and circa 1720 his sister Eliza held the lands with her husband Thomas Macdonald. Circa 1730 William Adair held the lands; his first wife was Anna Kennedy and his second Elizabeth Crawfurd.

Hugh Montgomerie of Prestwickshaws married Margaret Hamilton of Boreland and may have sold this property upon inheriting the Lands of Boreland from his wife's grandfather, she being the sole heir.

It is not clear which of these lairds was responsible for building the Shaw Monument.

== Micro-history ==
Mesolithic flints have been found near here (NS 369 261) on the 50 ft contour line.

One suggestion is that the structure is an ornate mine ventilation shaft tower and another entirely humorous one is that it was an early aircraft control tower.

Shaw Farm was demolished circa 1960 and Shawfarm Industrial Estate built on the land. The Pow Burn runs through the old lands of Shaw, now running through a culvert that lies under the runway.

Circa 1700 a Somerville, John Somerville, purchased the Kennox Estate near Stewarton.
