= Irvine Parker =

Scottish cricketer

Personal information
- Full name: Irvine Theodore Parker
- Born: 26 March 1890; Newton-on-Ayr, Ayrshire, Scotland
- Died: 14 May 1961 (aged 71); Kilmarnock, Ayrshire, Scotland
- Batting: Right-handed

Domestic team information
- Years: Team
- 1920–1926: Scotland

Career statistics
| Competition | First-class |
|---|---|
| Matches | 2 |
| Runs scored | 62 |
| Batting average | 31.00 |
| 100s/50s | –/1 |
| Top score | 62 |
| Catches/stumpings | 1/– |
- Source: Cricinfo, 23 October 2022

Irvine Theodore Parker MBE MC JP (26 March 1890 — 14 May 1961) was a Scottish first-class cricketer, British Army officer and educator.

The son of a wool merchant, Parker was born at Newton-on-Ayr in March 1890. He was educated at Ayr Academy, before matriculating to the University of Glasgow. There he initially studied at the Faculty of Arts, before switching to the Faculty of Pure Sciences; however, his time at university was interrupted by the First World War. He enlisted in the Queen's Own Cameron Highlanders in September 1914, later gaining a commission as a temporary second lieutenant in September 1916, serving with the Highland Light Infantry. In July 1917, Parker was wounded in action while placing an explosive charge to remove obstacles. While doing so, German soldiers appeared on his flanks and began to shoot. In the ensuing firefight, he was wounded, but remained the last to withdraw to allow his men to evacuate, assisting with the removal of the wounded who had become entangled in barbed wire. For this, he was warded the Military Cross in September 1917 for conspicuous gallantry and devotion to duty. By the end of the war, he held the temporary rank of captain, which he relinquished in August 1919.

Having previously captained the Glasgow University Cricket Eleven in 1914 and played club cricket for Ayr, Parker made two appearances in first-class cricket for Scotland against Ireland, six years apart from one another. The first came in 1920 at Edinburgh, with the second in 1926 played at Greenock. He scored 62 runs in these matches, which came in a single innings in the 1926 fixture, with Parker opening the batting and sharing in a 203 runs opening stand with John Kerr. Outside of cricket, Parker was a schoolmaster who later became headmaster of Grange Junior Secondary School in Kilmarnock. He was made a Member of the Order of the British Empire in the 1955 Birthday Honours. He was active within the community in Kilmarnock, serving as a justice of the peace and a member of the Kilmarnock Town Council. Parker died at Kilmarnock in May 1961.
