= Glasgow Prestwick Airport =

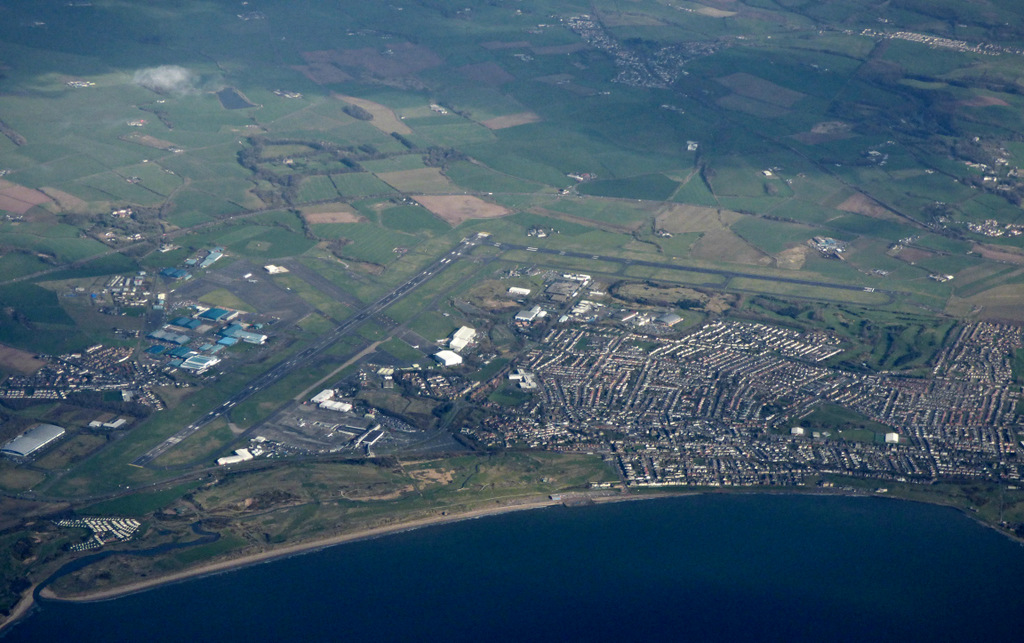
- Prestwick Airport from the air
- IATA: PIK; ICAO: EGPK

Summary
- Airport type: Public
- Owner: Scottish Government
- Operator: Prestwick Aviation Holdings Ltd.
- Serves: Ayrshire; Greater Glasgow
- Location: Prestwick, Scotland, UK
- Focus city for: Ryanair
- Elevation AMSL: 65 ft (20 m)
- Coordinates: 55°30′34″N 004°35′40″W
- Website: www.glasgowprestwick.com

Map
- Location in South Ayrshire Glasgow Prestwick Airport (Scotland) Glasgow Prestwick Airport (the United Kingdom)

Runways
Direction	Length		Surface
Direction	m	ft	Surface
12/30	2,987	9,800	Asphalt
02/20	1,906	6,253	Asphalt

Statistics (2025)
- Passengers: 620,960
- Passenger change 2024–25: ▲16%
- Aircraft movements: 20,547
- Movements change 2024–25: ▼9%
- Sources: UK AIP at NATS; Statistics from the UK Civil Aviation Authority

Glasgow Prestwick Airport (IATA: PIK, ICAO: EGPK) is an international airport serving the west of Scotland, situated 1 mile (2 km) northeast of the town of Prestwick, and 32 miles (51 km) southwest of Glasgow, Scotland. It is the less busy of the two airports serving the western part of Scotland's Central Belt, after Glasgow Airport in Renfrewshire, within the Greater Glasgow conurbation. The airport serves the urban cluster surrounding Ayr, including Kilmarnock, Irvine, Ardrossan, Troon, Saltcoats, Stevenston, Kilwinning, and Prestwick itself.

The airport is Scotland's fifth-busiest in terms of passenger traffic, although it is the largest in terms of land area. Passenger traffic peaked at 2.4 million in 2007 following a decade of rapid growth, driven in part by the boom in low-cost carriers, particularly Ryanair, which uses the airport as an operating base. In recent years, passenger traffic has declined; around 670,000 passengers passed through the airport in 2016. There has been public debate over the association of the airport with Glasgow, which is 32 miles (51 km) away from the airport. As a result, suggestions have been made for the airport to be renamed Robert Burns International Airport, however, this was ruled out by the Scottish Government in 2014.

Prestwick has a long historical connection with transatlantic flight, being part of the Atlantic Bridge route between Europe and North America, and prior to 1990 it was the only Scottish airport permitted to host commercial transatlantic flights. It remains an important hub for the United States Air Force and Royal Canadian Air Force, who use it as a refuelling stop. It is also used by major airlines for training and route proving for transatlantic operations. The operations centre of Shanwick Oceanic Control is located close to the airport, which controls all air traffic on the north eastern quadrant of the North Atlantic Ocean, including Scottish airspace (Scottish Area Control Centre), as well as the airspace over much of the north of England, the Midlands and the north of Wales. Several global aerospace companies, including Boeing (formerly Spirit AeroSystems), GE Aerospace and Collins Aerospace) have engineering facilities by the airfield.

== Early history ==
=== Origins and passenger facilities ===
Passenger facilities were added in 1938. These were used until further investment made Prestwick compatible with jet transportation. The October 1946 USAAF diagram shows a 6,600-foot (2,000-metre) runway 14/32, with a 4,500 ft (1,400 m) runway 8/26 crossing just west of its midpoint. In 1958, runway 13/31 was 7,000 ft (2,100 m) long; in May 1960, the runway's extension to 9,800 ft (3,000 m) opened.

A parallel taxiway, link road and an all-new terminal building were opened by the Queen Mother in 1964. The extension of runway 13/31 caused considerable disruption to road users, for the main road from Monkton into Prestwick now crossed the tarmac of the runway. This was controlled by a "level crossing" system until a new perimeter road was completed.

=== Military use ===
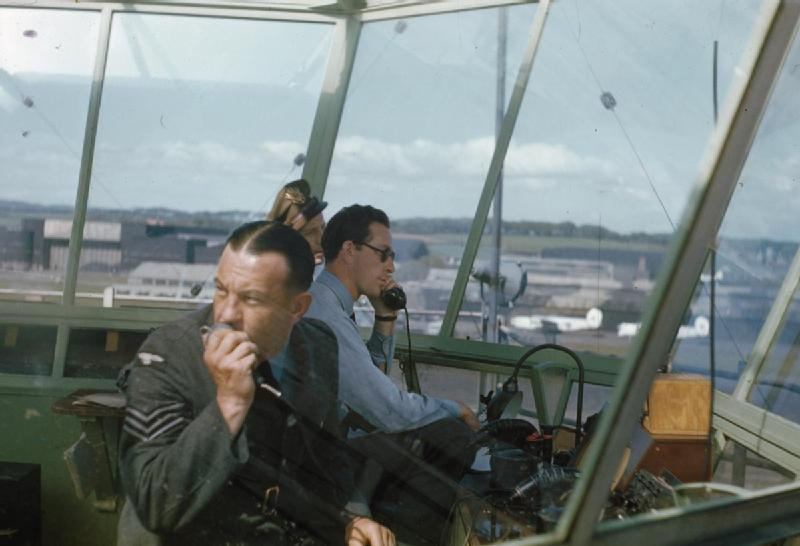
Royal Air Force controllers at the airport tower, 1944

In the Second World War the RAF controlled trans-Atlantic flights from Prestwick.

Until February 2016, part of the Prestwick site was occupied by the Royal Navy Fleet Air Arm with RNAS Prestwick, officially known by the Royal Navy as HMS Gannet, where a detachment of three Sea Kings provided a search and rescue role, covering one of the largest SAR areas of the UK including Ben Nevis, the Lakes, Northern Ireland and 200 nautical miles (370 kilometres) past the Irish coast. Additionally, Gannet SAR provided a medical evacuation service to the Scottish island communities. Personnel at the base numbered 15 officers, 11 ratings, 28 civil servants and 50 civilian staff. The crews regularly featured as part of the popular Channel 5 documentary series Highland Emergency. In 2009, the unit broke a new record as they were tasked to 447 call-outs, 20% of the UK's total military SAR call outs for 2009 and making them, for the second year in succession, the busiest search and rescue base in the UK.

There was controversy over the airport's use in the CIA's extraordinary rendition flights, as aircraft had used the airport as a stop-over point. Since November 2013, when the Scottish government took control of the facility, service contracts have been established with the USAF, USN, USMC, Defense Logistics Agency and National Guard.

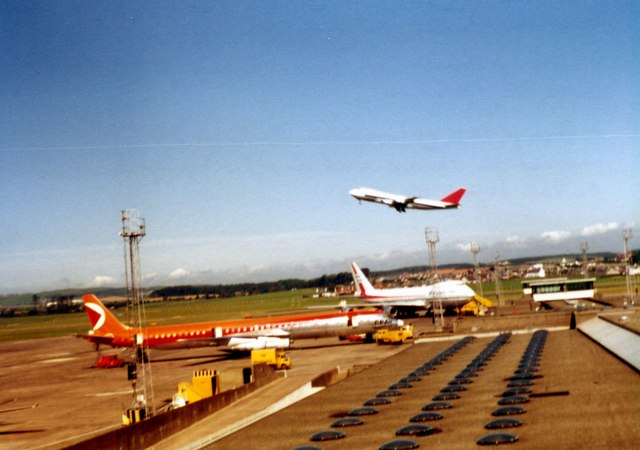
Aircraft at Prestwick Airport, July 1973

Glasgow Prestwick Airport is the only place in the United Kingdom where Elvis Presley (who had distant Scottish ancestry) was known to have set foot, when the United States Air Force transport plane carrying him home to the United States stopped to refuel in 1960, en route from West Germany. However, on 21 April 2008, during a BBC Radio 2 interview with Ken Bruce, theatre impresario and chairman of Everton FC, Bill Kenwright, said that Elvis actually spent a day in the UK being shown around London by Tommy Steele in 1958.

=== Commercial use ===
In 1945, American Overseas Airlines began regular transatlantic commercial flights began between Prestwick and New York. AOA was later acquired by Pan Am, which used Prestwick as a stop between Europe and North America into the 1970s. BOAC also used Prestwick as a stop between London and New York in the late 1940s and 1950s.

In the 1980s, Prestwick continued to see scheduled transatlantic flights by Air Canada and Northwest Airlines. These carriers both moved their operations to Glasgow Airport after government restrictions were lifted in 1990. Until 1990, the British government required all transatlantic flights to and from Scotland to use Prestwick.

== Recent history ==
=== 1990s ===
1992 marked the beginning of a renaissance for the struggling airport when purchased by "Canadian entrepreneur" Matthew Hudson in a "dramatic rescue". Hudson initiated the construction of the airport's railway station on the existing Ayrshire Coast Line (Glasgow–Ayr), which runs past the airfield, making it the first Scottish airport with its own railway station. In her book about Prestwick Airport, South Ayrshire councillor Ann Galbraith writes about this tough time in the airport's history, saying that "if it hadn't been for Matthew Hudson the airport wouldn't be here today".

In 1994, Irish budget airline Ryanair opened a route to the airport from Dublin, followed by a second route in 1995 to London Stansted. In 1998, a third route to Paris-Beauvais was introduced and the airport was sold by Hudson to the Scottish transport company Stagecoach Group.

=== 2000s ===
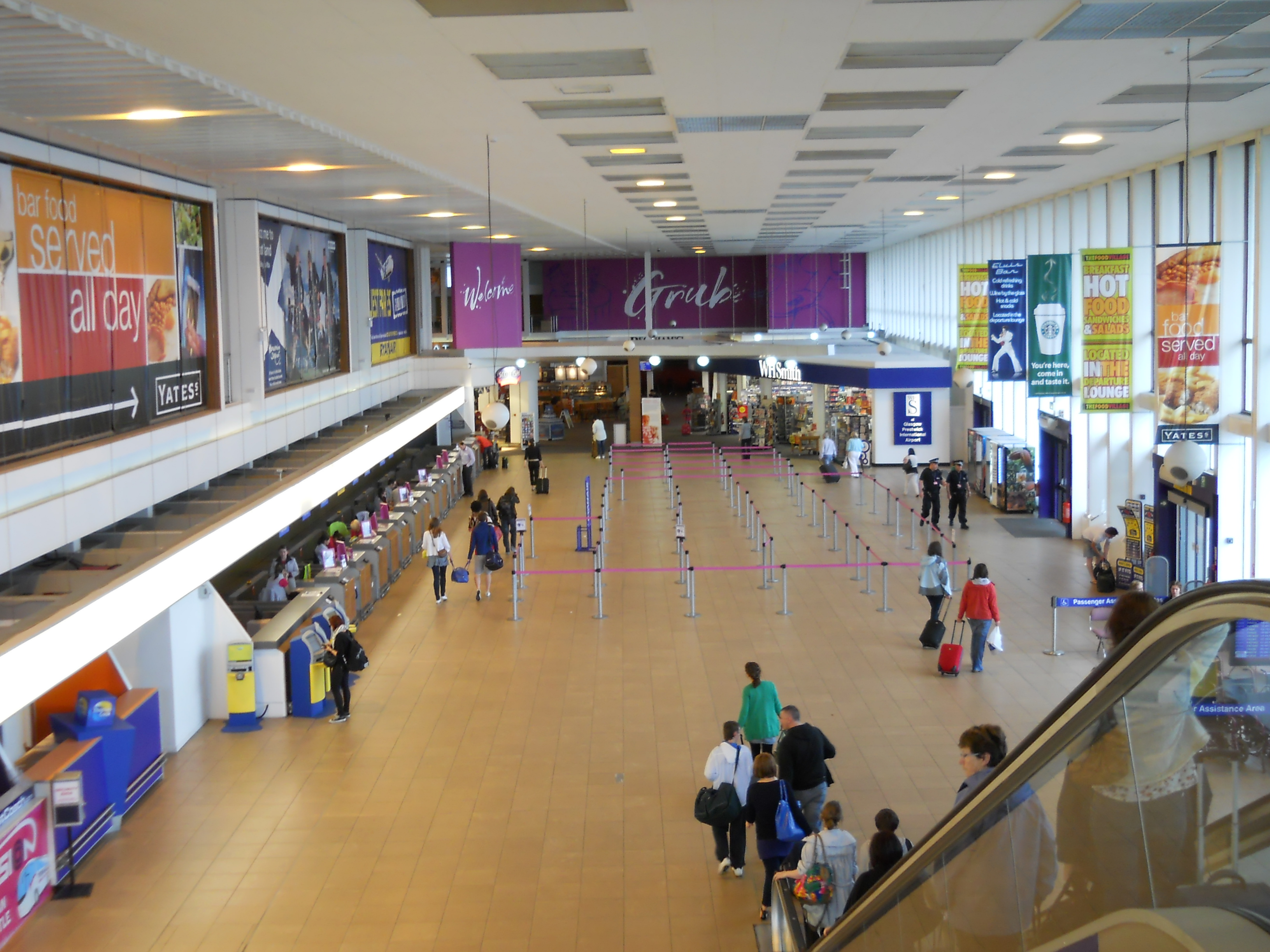
Check-in area at Prestwick Airport

In 2001, the airport was purchased by Infratil, a New Zealand company and majority owner of Wellington International Airport. Infratil also owned Manston Airport until November 2013. Manston was sold to a shell company owned by Ann Gloag, a co-founder of Stagecoach, Prestwick's previous owner. In April 2005, Infratil completed a major refurbishment of the terminal building, and rebranded the airport using the phrase "pure dead brilliant", taken straight from the Glasgow patter. Some of the rebranding has been controversial, in particular the redecoration of the airport bar. The bar was rebranded in February 2006 with a logo depicting a man in a kilt, unconscious with an empty bottle of whisky.

Despite objections that it promoted the wrong image of Scotland to foreign visitors and embarrassed local travellers, the airport management insisted the logo was "fun and visually stimulating". However, it was removed a matter of weeks after installation, after the South Ayrshire Licensing Board said the logo trivialised excessive drinking. The "pure dead brilliant" branding was removed from the main terminal building in January 2014.

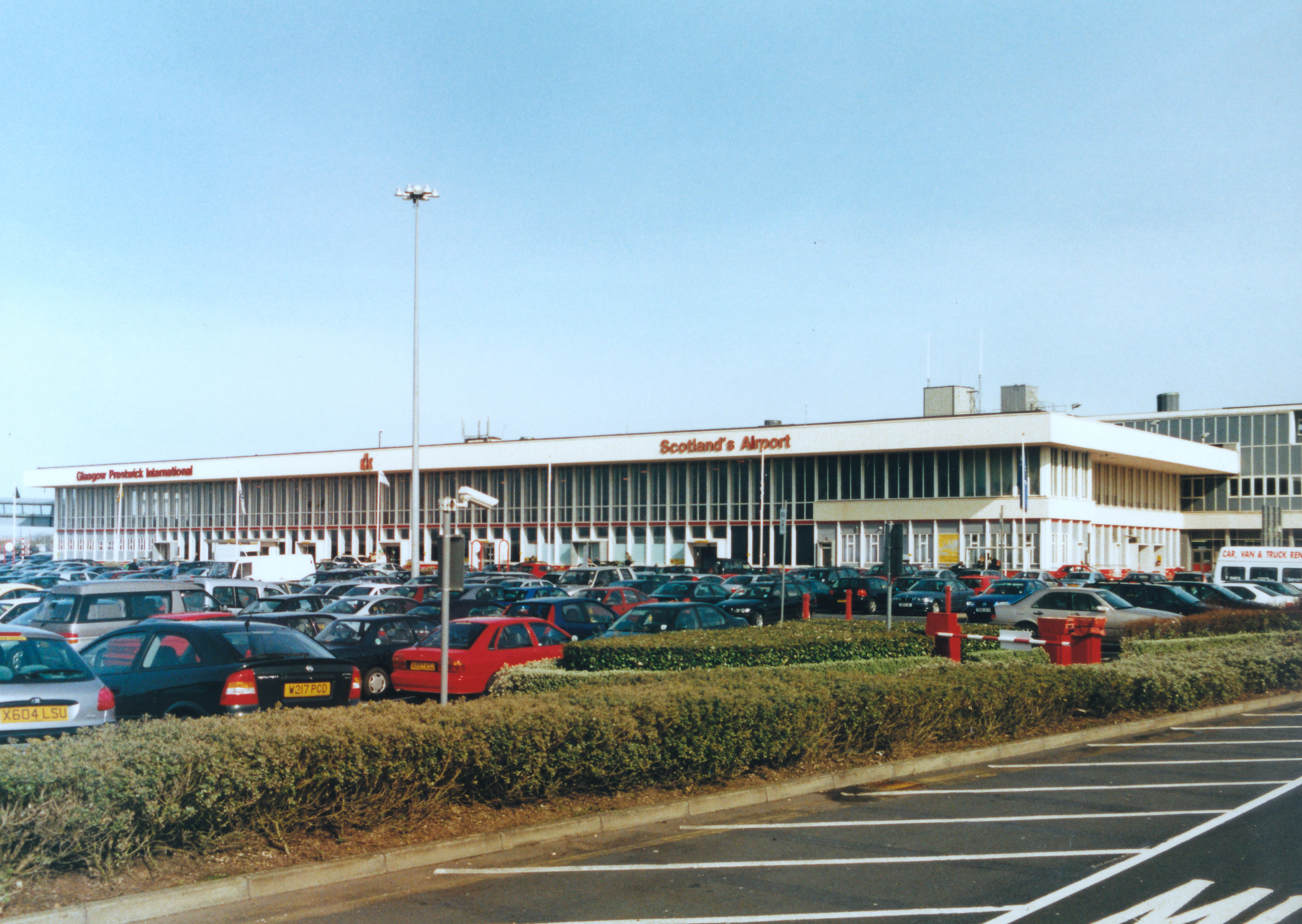
The terminal building in 2002

Since 2007, the airport has occasionally been used by the BBC TV programme Top Gear as the location for various stunts and experiments. The best-known stunt was a scene similar to one featured in the film Casino Royale and featured both a Ford Mondeo and a Citroën 2CV parked behind the engines of a Virgin Atlantic Boeing 747-400, in an experiment to investigate whether the thrust from the aircraft's four jet engines really could lift a car off the ground.

The car park and A79 outside the terminal building have been reconstructed to comply with governmental movement and access restrictions mandated in the aftermath of the Glasgow International Airport terrorist attack. According to a 2008 Master Plan, the departure lounge is at capacity and congested during peak operations. The plan proposes "a central pier that provides adequate circulation and waiting space prior to boarding the aircraft" to cope with a continuing increase in passenger departures.

=== 2010s ===
On 8 March 2012, the airport owner Infratil announced that it planned to sell the airfield. The airport remained unsold until October 2013 when the Scottish Government announced it was in negotiations to take the airport back into public ownership. Subsequently, the Scottish Government bought the airport on 22 November 2013 for £1, Infratil having incurred annual losses of £2,000,000. No job losses were anticipated after the government takeover. Then-Deputy First Minister Nicola Sturgeon told BBC Scotland that work would then begin on "turning Prestwick around and making it a viable enterprise".

On 1 April 2014, the public petition committee at Holyrood heard that The Robert Burns World Federation wished to rename the airport to Robert Burns International Airport. In June 2014, Ryanair announced the relocation of some routes from Prestwick to Glasgow International Airport by October 2014; included among them were flights to Warsaw and Dublin.

In November 2014 Donald Trump signed a partnership agreement with Prestwick making it the Scottish base for all Trump Aviation Operations, to service his Trump Turnberry golf resort 20 miles (32 km) away.

As part of the privatisation of the UK's search and rescue service, Bristow Helicopters based two Sikorsky S-92 helicopters in a new hangar at HMS Gannet. The handover took place in January 2016. In March 2016, the airport revealed new branding and a new look to the inside and outside of the airport building.

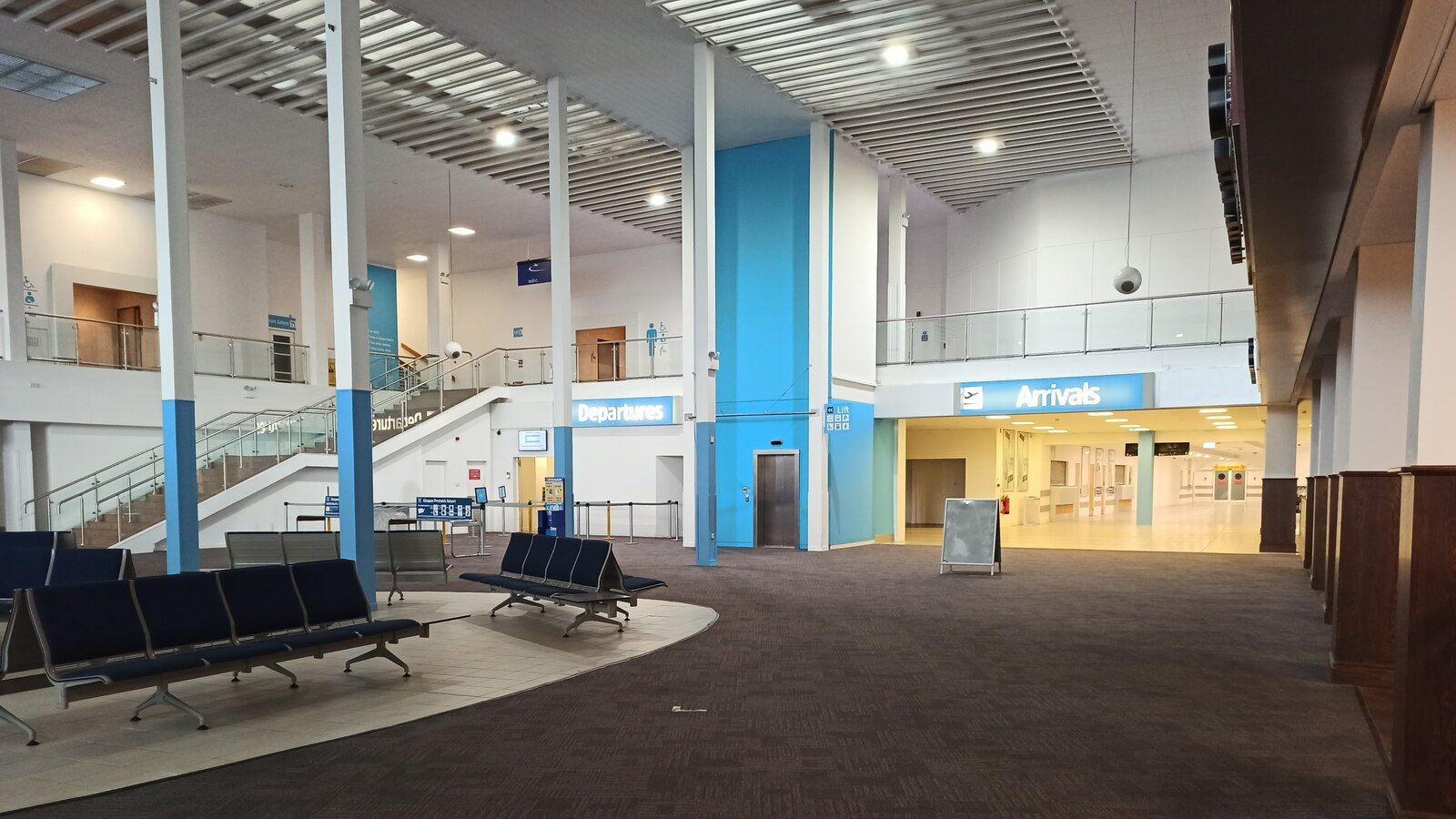
Arrivals and departures lounge at the airport

In 2015, Glasgow Prestwick Airport was shortlisted as a potential UK Spaceport, as part of the British commercial spaceport competition. In June 2019, the Scottish government announced that it was putting the airport up for sale. Bidders would be expected to commit to maintaining and developing aviation operations and employment.

In July 2018, then-president of the United States Donald Trump arrived at the airport after a meeting with Elizabeth II for a weekend "private visit".

=== 2020s ===
In February 2021, the Scottish government announced that a preferred bidder had been selected to buy the airport. The unnamed bidder was believed to be a European transport infrastructure investor. However, the Scottish government announced in December 2021 that the bid had been rejected, and that the sale would not proceed. The airport would consequently remain in public ownership, but the government stated it was committed to "returning it to the private sector at the appropriate time and opportunity." As of January 2023, no private investor has been found yet but there was ongoing debate if the airport is financially viable or will require further loans from the government.

In July 2025, 47th president of the United States Donald Trump again visited the airport for a 5-day "private visit" to Turnberry and later on his Trump International Golf Links, Scotland where he opened a second course.

The airport has come under scrutiny by politicians and pressure groups due to its links with the Israeli Air Force and United States Air Force. This has led to a ban of all Israeli air force aircraft following the Gaza war. In January 2026, following the use of Prestwick Airport during the removal of the captain of the Marinera, which had been seized and anchored in the Moray Firth, co-leader of the Scottish Greens, Ross Greer, accused the First Minister of Scotland, John Swinney, of "sitting on his hands" and allowing this to happen. Calls for a ban have increased since the start of the 2026 Iran war, including a protest at the airport.

== Airlines and destinations ==
=== Passenger ===
The following airlines operate regular scheduled services to and from Glasgow–Prestwick:

Airlines	Destinations
Ryanair	Alicante, Lanzarote, Málaga, Tenerife–South; Seasonal: Barcelona, Faro, Gran Canaria, Murcia, Palma de Mallorca, Pisa, Turin (begins 12 December 2026)

=== Cargo ===
Airlines	Destinations
Air China Cargo	Beijing–Capital, Chengdu–Shuangliu, Guangzhou, Stockholm–Arlanda, Shanghai–Pudong
Air France Cargo	Chicago–O'Hare, Paris–Charles de Gaulle
Beijing Capital Airlines	Oslo, Zhengzhou
Cargolux	Houston–Intercontinental, Los Angeles, Luxembourg, Seattle/Tacoma
China Southern Cargo	Guangzhou
Ethiopian Airlines Cargo	Hong Kong

== Statistics ==
=== Passengers ===
	Passengers (Note: Number of passengers including domestic, international and transit counterparts)	Aircraft movements (Note: Number of movements represents total aircraft takeoffs and landings during each year.)	Freight (tonnes)
1997	567,000	63,166	33,874
1998	558,000	54,166	39,600
1999	702,000	54,093	40,845
2000	905,000	44,940	41,450
2001	1,232,000	48,144	43,104
2002	1,486,000	43,190	39,500
2003	1,854,000	57,099	39,975
2004	2,159,000	55,998	34,102
2005	2,405,000	54,996	29,199
2006	2,395,000	48,189	28,537
2007	2,421,000	47,910	31,517
2008	2,415,755	42,708	22,966
2009	1,817,727	34,230	13,385
2010	1,662,744	33,087	12,163
2011	1,297,119	28,131	11,846
2012	1,067,933	25,670	10,314
2013	1,145,836	24,305	9,526
2014	913,685	25,643	12,540
2015	610,837	22,765	11,242
2016	673,232	25,714	10,822
2017	696,309	24,897	11,393
2018	681,718	24,904	13,033
2019	640,455	24,463	13,054
2020	90,790	14,085	12,049
2021	78,069	17,126	16,209
2022	445,211	19,034	15,298
2023	524,880	24,471	10,673
2024	535,570	22,615	9,515
2025	620,960	20,547	34,068
Source: United Kingdom Civil Aviation Authority

=== Routes ===
Busiest routes to and from Glasgow Prestwick (2025)
Rank	Airport	Total passengers	Change 2024/25
1	Tenerife–South	119,098	▲6%
2	Alicante	116,430	▲23%
3	Málaga	88,376	▲43%
4	Palma de Mallorca	60,378	▼4%
5	Murcia	53,283	▲66%
6	Lanzarote	49,928	▲32%
7	Barcelona	47,825	Steady
8	Faro	41,311	Steady
9	Gran Canaria	20,842	Steady
10	Pisa	20,101	▲2%

== Scottish International Airshow ==
Prestwick Airport used to host a bi-annual air show, the first of which was held on 30 September 1967. While very small in scale compared to such shows as RAF Fairford or Farnborough International Airshow, the Scottish air show attracted up to 100,000 spectators to Prestwick in its heyday in the 1980s.

The revived Scottish International Airshow was brought back by three Ayrshire aviation and events professionals Danny Anderson, Bob Alexander (2014 and 2015) and Doug Maclean. The events company Zisys Events shouldered the organisation burden and financial risk. It was restarted on 6 and 7 September 2014; an air display was held at the Low green at Ayr Seafront and a static display on 7 September at the airport. The event included appearances by the Battle of Britain Memorial Flight, including the only two flying Avro Lancaster bombers, and the last airworthy Avro Vulcan bomber, famous for being part of the UK's Nuclear "V Force" bomber fleet. The second Scottish Airshow was held on 5 and 6 September 2015. Danny Anderson and Doug Maclean were innovative in their ideas for displays. The 2016 Scottish International Airshow included the first night display in Scotland. It started with the RAF Typhoon doing a first dusk display and ended with the Aerosparx Formation Team flying in darkness and discharging pyrotechnics from the aircraft wing tips.

Between 2014 and 2018 the Scottish International Airshow continued to develop and brought very respected formation teams and vintage aircraft and modern fighter jets from Denmark, Belgium The Netherlands, Ireland and Switzerland as well as the highly unusual Swiss Vintage Formation of 3 Beech 18s and a DC3 flying together in a unique display. The attendances continued to rise each year with over 200,000 people reported to attend over 2 days in 2018. The 2019 Airshow was planned to highlight the return to Prestwick of the CF104 Starfighter from Norway and a Spanish Air Force helicopter formation. It was also intended to include a static aircraft display at Glasgow Prestwick Airport. The show was cancelled at an early stage due to a dispute between the organisers and the local Council and the withdrawal of financial support by the Council. The 2020 Covid pandemic meant that there was no display planned.

It was announced that the airshow would return for 2023, organised by South Ayrshire Council and rebranded as The International Ayrshow - Festival Of Flight beginning on the weekend of 8 September 2023.

== Incidents and accidents ==
- On 28 August 1944, a United States Army Air Forces Douglas C54A Skymaster flying from Boston via Keflavik crashed into houses on the south side of the airport while attempting to land. All 20 crew and passengers as well as five people on the ground were killed.
- On 20 October 1948, a Lockheed L-049 Constellation of KLM crashed on approach to Prestwick; all 40 aboard died.
- Early on 25 December 1954, at 03:30, the 1954 Prestwick air disaster involved a British Overseas Airways Corporation Boeing 377 Stratocruiser which crashed on landing at Prestwick, killing 28 of the 36 passengers and crew on board. The aircraft had been en route from London to New York City, when, on approach to Prestwick, it entered a steep descent before levelling out too late and too severely, hitting the ground short of the runway. The crash has been attributed to a number of factors, including pilot fatigue (the captain was well over his duty limit due to the aircraft being delayed); the landing lights at Prestwick being out of action due to repair; and the first officer either not hearing a command from the captain for landing lights (which might have helped judge the low cloud base) or mistakenly hitting the flaps, causing the aircraft to stall.
- On 3 November 1973, Pan Am 160 crashed at Logan International Airport following a loss of control due to smoke; the aircraft was meant to stop over at Prestwick.
- On 17 March 1977, a British Airtours Boeing 707 crashed during a pilot training flight and caught fire. All four crew on board survived.
- On 6 October 1992, a BAe Jetstream 31 operated by British Aerospace on a training flight to East Midlands Airport crashed shortly after takeoff at Prestwick after simulating an engine failure. Both occupants were killed.
- On 15 June 2013, an Egyptair flight from Cairo bound for New York–JFK was diverted to Prestwick Airport under RAF escort due to a note found on board threatening to 'set the plane on fire'. Roads surrounding the airport were closed as police dealt with the incident.
- On 5 September 2015, during the Scottish International Airshow, Avro Vulcan bomber XH558 experienced an issue with its nosewheel. The nosewheel failed to extend properly and lock into place. A displaying Spitfire was asked to verify that the nosewheel was down and locked – the Spitfire confirmed it was not. The crew finally were able to secure the nosewheel in a fully down position and made a successful landing on runway 30, with an extended flare. There were no injuries and the aircraft and crew made a safe return journey to their home base with the gear extended.
- On 28 October 2016, a Volaris Airbus A320 was diverted under RAF escort to Prestwick whilst en route to Keflavík International Airport following a loss of communications. There were only 7 crew onboard and some roads surrounding the airport were shut.
- On 23 April 2024 a Piper PA-28-181 crashed near the airport, due to carburettor icing. Both occupants were seriously injured.

== Ground transport ==
=== Road ===
Glasgow Prestwick Airport connects with the UK motorway network via the A77 on to the M77. This allows Glasgow to be reached by road from the airport in 40 minutes and Edinburgh in just over 1 hour and 30 minutes.

=== Rail ===
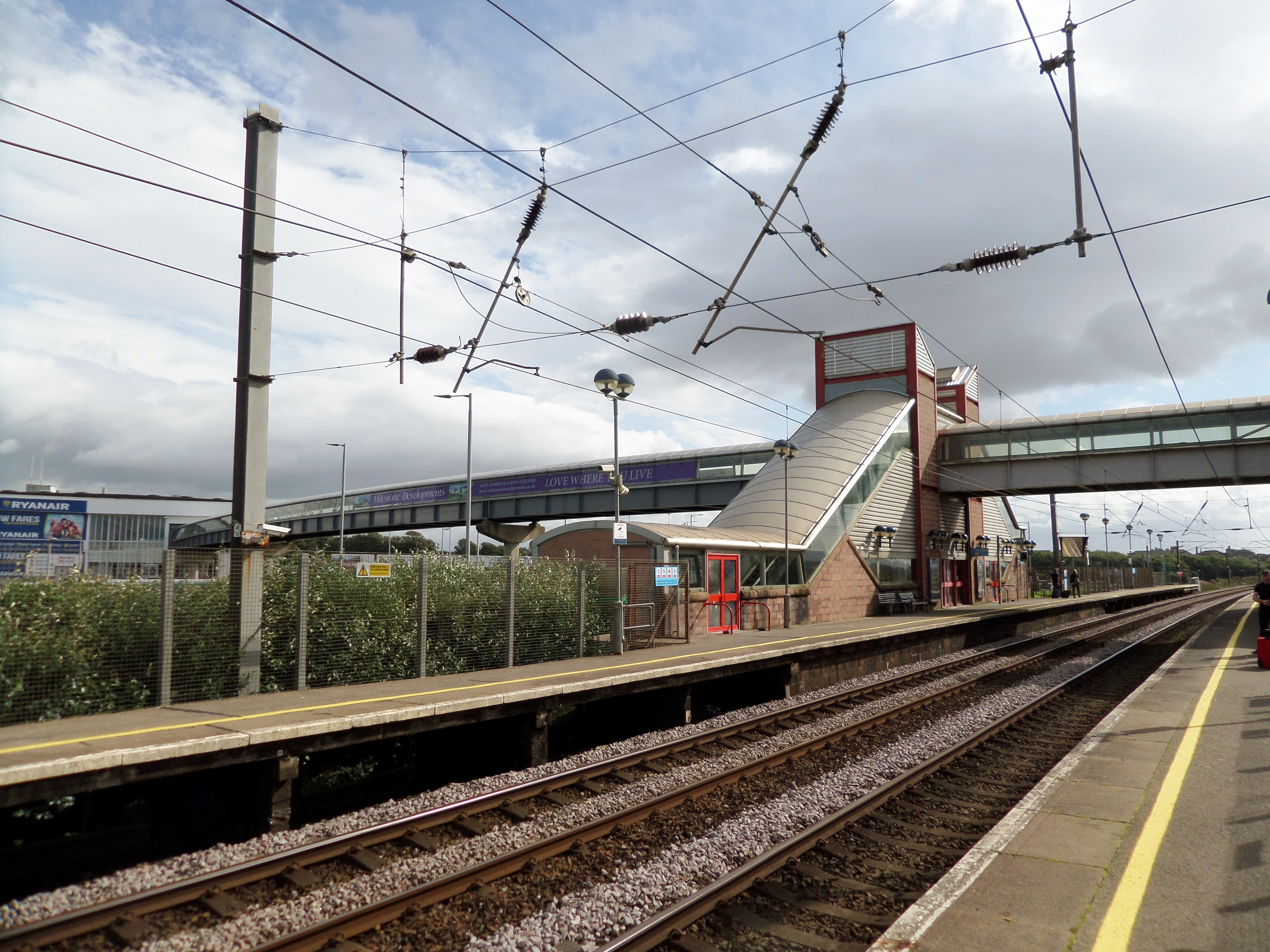
The airport station

Prior to the opening of Inverness Airport railway station in 2023, Prestwick airport was the only airport in Scotland with its own railway station, Prestwick International Airport railway station, built by the airport in 1994. The station is connected to the terminal by an enclosed walkway over the A79 road, and platforms are accessed by stairs, escalators and lifts. The station building continues to be owned and operated by the airport, and not by Network Rail or ScotRail. The track through the station itself remains the responsibility of Network Rail.

=== Bus ===
Prestwick International Airport is well-connected by bus services operated by Stagecoach West Scotland.

== See also ==
- Orangefield House, South Ayrshire – the former control tower
- Fail Monastery – remains of used as foundations for the airport
