= Pan Am Flight 160 =

1973 aviation accident

- Wreckage of the aircraft after the accident

Accident
- Date: November 3, 1973
- Summary: Loss of control due to smoke in the cockpit
- Site: Logan International Airport, Boston, Massachusetts, United States

Aircraft
- A Pan Am Boeing 707 identical to the one involved
- Aircraft type: Boeing 707-321C
- Aircraft name: Clipper Titian
- Operator: Pan American World Airways
- IATA flight No.: PA160
- ICAO flight No.: PAA160
- Call sign: CLIPPER 160
- Registration: N458PA
- Flight origin: John F. Kennedy International Airport, New York City, New York, United States
- Stopover: Glasgow Prestwick Airport, Glasgow, United Kingdom
- Destination: Frankfurt Airport, Frankfurt, West Germany
- Occupants: 3
- Crew: 3
- Fatalities: 3
- Survivors: 0

Pan Am Flight 160 was a scheduled cargo flight which crashed on November 3, 1973. The Boeing 707 of Pan Am crashed after smoke in the cockpit prevented the crew from keeping control of the aircraft, killing all three occupants on board.

== Accident ==
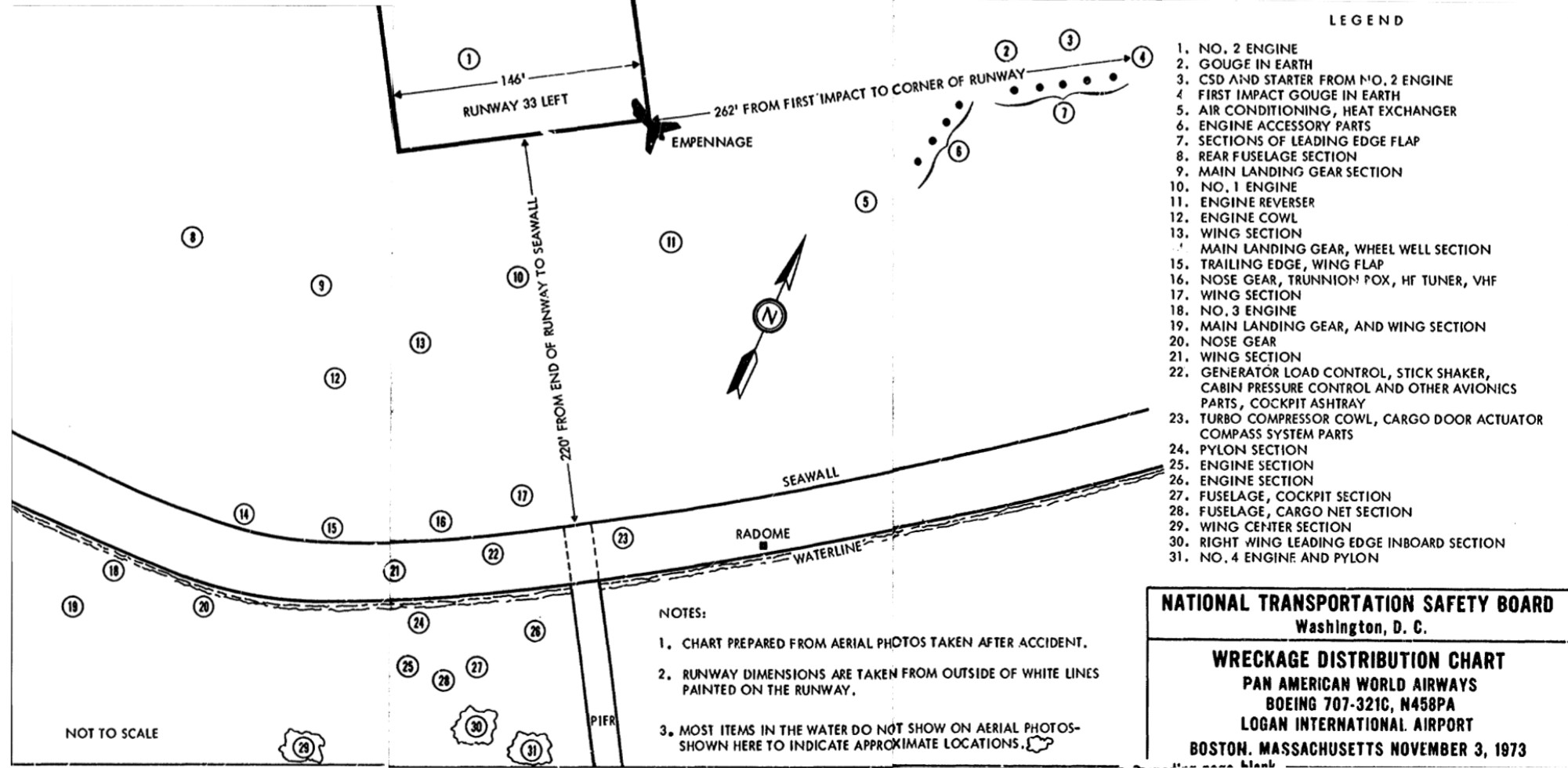
Pan Am Flight 160 accident site map by National Transportation Safety Board

On November 3, 1973, Pan Am flight 160 departed John F. Kennedy International Airport in New York for the destination of Frankfurt with a stop in Prestwick, Scotland. The flight departed at 08:25 EST and was carrying 15,360 lb (6,970 kg) of chemicals. The first sign of trouble occurred at 09:04 EST with smoke in the lower 41 electrical compartment and this was reported to control. They also mentioned that they were going to divert to Boston. The crew contacted air traffic control (ATC) and was granted a return to JFK. Then, a major setback occurred, which was that the cockpit became thick with smoke. This made them turn back around to Boston. To help get the plane under its maximum landing weight (MLW), the crew descended to 2,000 feet (610 m) to increase the fuel burn rate. The crew requested to land on Runway 33 Left and this was approved by ATC. About this time, the crew shut off all non-essential systems. Soon, the transponder became inoperative. Once they were on final approach, with the airplane properly configured with flaps, the yaw damper was disengaged as a fatal result of critical mistakes during the execution of procedures. Henceforth, this made control of the plane hard at low speeds. Witnesses saw smoke pouring out of the cockpit windows, and the aircraft stalled out and crashed in a near vertical position with nose facing down.

== Cause ==
The accident was caused by several factors, including the continued generation of smoke in the cockpit. This amount of smoke led to an uncontrollable emergency situation in which the yaw damper was disabled by turning off the essential bus. This smoke in the cockpit also affected the crew's ability to perform tasks. The source of smoke could not be identified, but most likely the result of a nitric acid leak and improper packing of hazardous material, with a reaction between nitric acid and sawdust producing smoke. The noncompliance of several laws regarding the transport of hazmat goods from all of the complexity, the industry lacking the knowledge of laws, overlapping jurisdictions, and lack of surveillance by the government.

== Criminal charge ==
Pan Am was indicted on a charge of criminal negligence and pled no contest to the charge in 1976. The company that owned the chemicals and other companies involved in the shipment were also charged. This was the first time an airline had been charged with criminal negligence related to a plane crash.

== See also ==
- Swissair Flight 111
- UPS Airlines Flight 6
- Saudia Flight 163
