= Laura Macdonald =

British jazz saxophonist

Laura Margaret Macdonald (born 17 July 1974, Glasgow) is a Scottish alto and soprano saxophonist, composer and teacher, specialising in jazz.

She attended Prestwick Academy and the Royal Scottish Academy of Music and Drama, before moving to Boston, Massachusetts to study at the Berklee College of Music. She began to play the saxophone at the relatively late age of 16, after disowning the violin. She graduated from Berklee College of Music in 1998, and is now based in Scotland, working as a music instructor for South Lanarkshire Council. In 2026, she was appointed the Head of Jazz at the Royal Conservatoire of Scotland.

She has worked with many jazz musicians including Tommy Smith, drummer Jeff "Tain" Watts, bassist James Genus, pianist David Budway, Guy Barker and Jason Rebello, and has made many appearances at notable jazz events, including the Edinburgh Jazz and Blues Festival and the Edinburgh Fringe. In addition, she is a prominent player within the Scottish National Jazz Orchestra. Laura is a two time Paul Hamlyn Composition Award Nominee, winner of Scottish Jazz Awards ‘Best Instrumentalist’ award and Masterchef Finalist 2021.

Her recordings include the eponymous Laura in 2001 featuring David Budway (piano), James Genus (bass) and Jeff "Tain" Watts (drums); and Awakenings in 2003 with the Laura Macdonald Sextet: Steve Hamilton (piano), Donny McCaslin (tenor saxophone and flute), Gildas Boclé (bass), Claus Stoetter (trumpet and flugelhorn) and Antonio Sanchez (drums).

Macdonald appeared on the 2021 series of Masterchef on the BBC.
