= Ayr Academy =

Coordinates: 55°27′53″N 4°38′03″W

Ayr Academy Acadamaidh Inbhir Àir
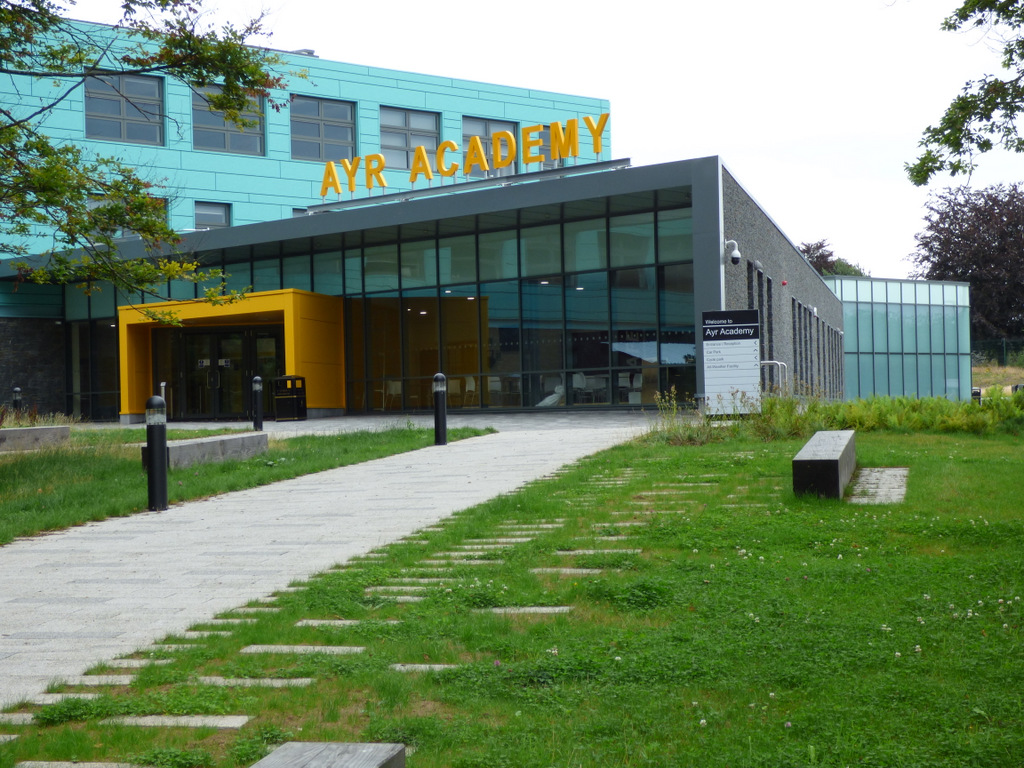
- School badge Ayr Academy on University Avenue

Location
- University Avenue; Ayr, South Ayrshire, KA8 0SZ; Scotland

Information
- Type: 11–18 non-denominational secondary school
- Motto: Respice Prospice
- Established: c.1233
- Local authority: South Ayrshire Council
- Head Teacher: Laura Traynor
- Gender: Boys and girls
- Age: 11 to 18
- Enrolment: 607 (2023–2024)
- Houses: Galloway, Kyle and Carrick
- Colour
- Associated primary schools: See associated schools
- Website: Ayr Academy

Ayr Academy (Scottish Gaelic: Acadamaidh Inbhir Àir) is an 11–18 non-denominational secondary school situated within the Craigie Estate area at University Avenue in Ayr, South Ayrshire. It is the sixth largest secondary school in South Ayrshire, with a pupil roll of 607 in 2023–2024. Established during the thirteenth century in 1233, Ayr Academy is one of the oldest schools in the United Kingdom and Scotland.

The school is operated by South Ayrshire Council, with Laura Traynor serving as Head Teacher. Ayr Academy's catchment area covers Newton-on-Ayr, Whitletts and the outlying villages of Coylton, Annbank, and Mossblown. Ayr Academy is one of the schools in South Ayrshire with high levels of economic deprivation and disadvantage, with more pupils attending Ayr Academy from deprived backgrounds than most other schools in the area.

== History ==
=== Early history ===
The school has existed, in various guises, since 1233, although it did not come to be known as Ayr Academy until 1794, when a Royal Charter converted the school into Ayr Academy. It moved from the Sandgate to a new location situated on Fort Street in 1800, with a further extension to the building added in the 1930s. Ayr Academy remained on Fort Street until a new school was built within the Craigie area of the town. Ayr Academy's coat of arms was awarded in 1912 and bears the school motto Respice Prospice which means look backwards, look forward.

=== Mainholm closure ===
In 2007, the closure of Mainholm Academy resulted in the addition of approximately 100 pupils attending Ayr Academy.

=== Shared Headship with Kyle Academy ===
On 1 November 2016, the South Ayrshire Council Leadership Panel approved a pilot Shared Headship arrangement between Ayr Academy and Kyle Academy. Pupil attainment in National 5 and Higher qualifications at Ayr Academy has been much lower than the national average due to several factors. The purpose of the Shared Headship programme was to encourage sharing of practice and standards to raise attainment at Ayr Academy.

The pilot proved successful in addressing the areas identified within the November 2016 report. It was found that there was an increase in attainment at every level within Ayr Academy except for Advanced Higher. In addition, the decline in pupil roll is slowing with fewer students transferring from Ayr Academy, pupil attendance has improved, and exclusion numbers are declining.

The Shared Headship programme was scheduled to run until June 2018, with South Ayrshire Council publishing reports in September 2018 to assess its success. However, in November 2017, it was reported that Lyndsay McRoberts, Executive Head Teacher at Ayr and Kyle Academies, was appointed to Head Teacher at Duncanrig Secondary School in East Kilbride. This resulted in South Ayrshire Council making the decision to advertise for both Head Teacher posts at both Ayr and Kyle Academies, despite the Shared Headship trial not yet being completed. The post of Executive Depute Head Teacher at both Ayr and Kyle Academies, however, remained in place until June 2018.

=== New building ===
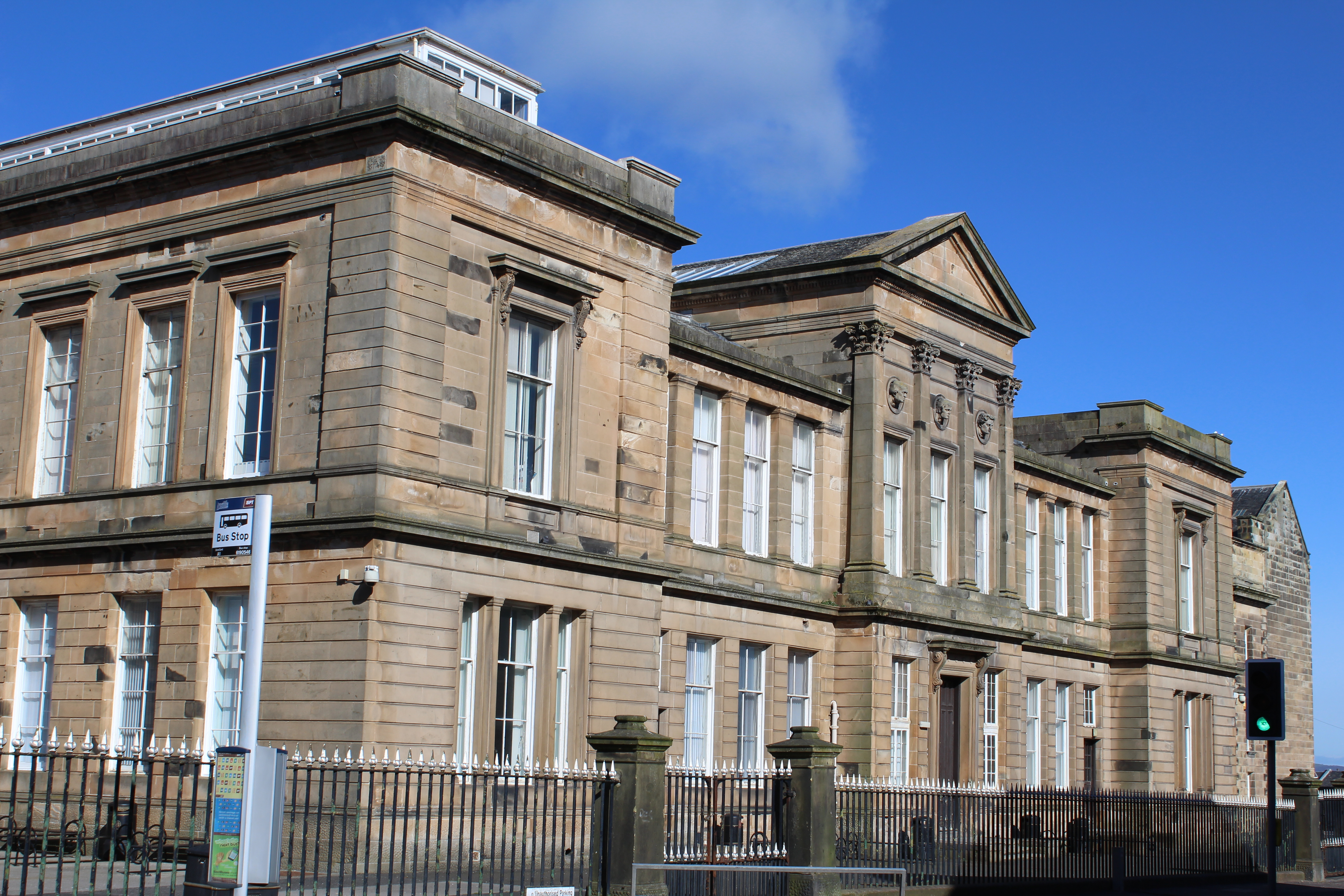
The former Ayr Academy on Fort Street closed in 2017, now housing Ayr Grammar Primary School

Ayr Academy's Fort Street site had fallen into a state of disrepair, leading South Ayrshire Council to put forward proposals to construct a new build at University Avenue on the Craigie estate in Ayr, costing £25 million to create the Ayr Academy Learning Campus. Construction for the new school commenced in January 2016, with the new school opening to staff and pupils in August 2017. The new Ayr Academy build has the capacity for up to 1,000 pupils and will include two unique ‘learning plazas’ – open spaces that can be used to bring together multiple classes for collaborative learning and discussions.

The project was delivered by Hub South West, created in conjunction with SFT and other partner organisations to deliver major public sector building projects. Construction work was undertaken by Kier Construction.

The new school was built within Craigie and the handover to South Ayrshire Council was completed on 4 August 2017 for the start of term on 18 August 2017. The old Ayr Academy closed for the final time to pupils on 23 June 2017 and to staff on 28 June 2017.

== Catchment area ==
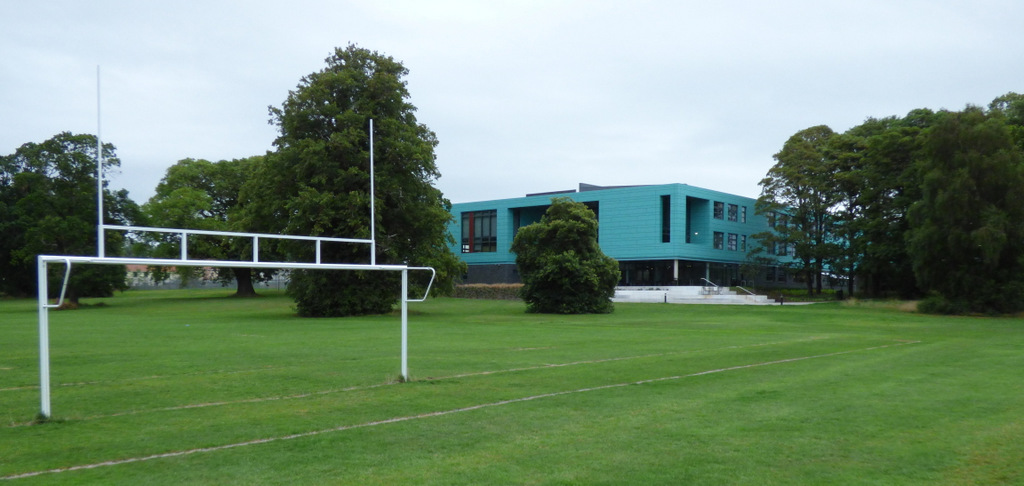
Ayr Academy and playing fields, August 2018

Ayr Academy has one of the highest levels of economic deprivation and disadvantage among schools in South Ayrshire, with more pupils attending Ayr Academy from deprived backgrounds than most in the area. This was highlighted with the release of the SQA national examination results in 2015, with Ayr Academy's performance being the worst in South Ayrshire. The Director of Education for South Ayrshire Council, Douglas Hutchison, stated that "research shows that young people who are less economically advantaged achieve less well across Scotland. Therefore, to compare schools that may experience greater levels of deprivation does not reflect the hard work by staff and young people".

Pupils who attend Ayr Academy reside in areas to the north of Ayr, including neighbourhoods such as Whitletts and Dalmilling, as well as former coal mining villages. In comparison, pupils attending nearby Kyle Academy reside in more affluent areas of Ayr such Park Circus and Bellevue Crescent. This is reflected in national examination results, with Kyle Academy performing the best in the South Ayrshire area and Ayr Academy performing the worst.

== Associated schools ==
The associated primary schools for Ayr Academy are currently:

- Annbank Primary School
- Coylton Primary School
- Dalmilling Primary School
- Newton Primary School

== Former rectors and head teachers ==
- 1932-1945: Dr Jas. B. Ritchie
- 1945-1965: Mr J.D Cairns
- 1965-1970: Mr N McCorkindale
- 1970–1982: Mr W Reid
- 1982–1989: Mr B Ballantyne
- 1989–1997: Mr A Moir
- 1997–2010: Mr D Mathieson
- 2010–2016: Mrs K MacDonald
- 2016–2018: Mrs L McRoberts
- 2018–present: Mrs L Traylor

== Notable alumni ==
Notable former pupils include:

- James Morris Gale, civil engineer responsible for the extension of supply of water to Glasgow.
- Irvine Parker, first-class cricketer
- Ian Dallas, writer
- William Neill, poet
- Jackie Brambles radio DJ and television presenter

== See also ==
- List of the oldest schools in the United Kingdom
