= Prestwick =

Coordinates: 55.495551°N 4.614160°W

Prestwick: Scottish Gaelic: Preastabhaig
- town and former royal burgh
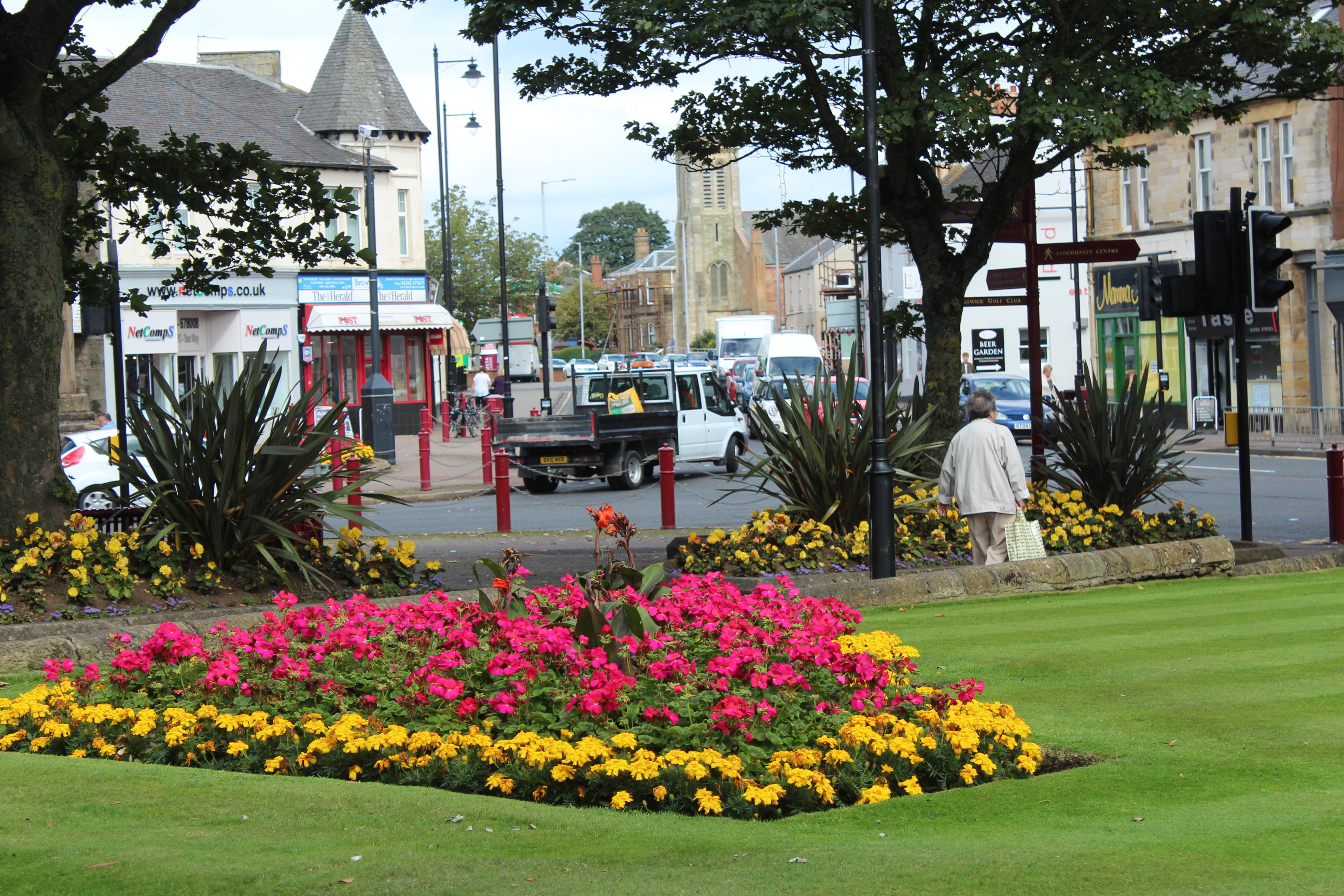
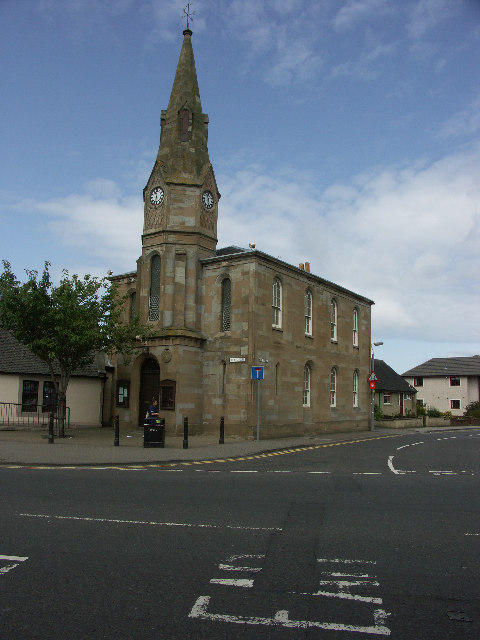
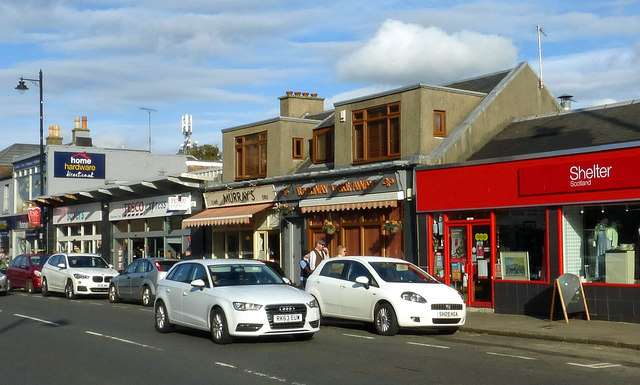
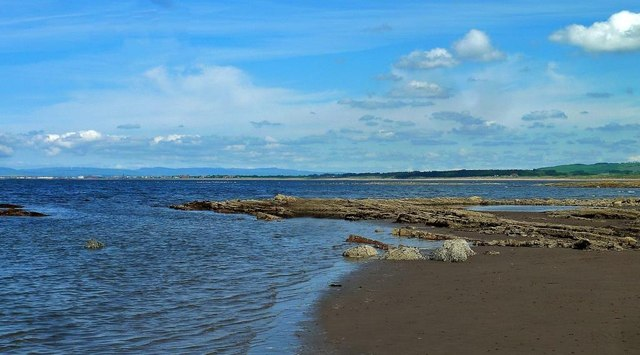
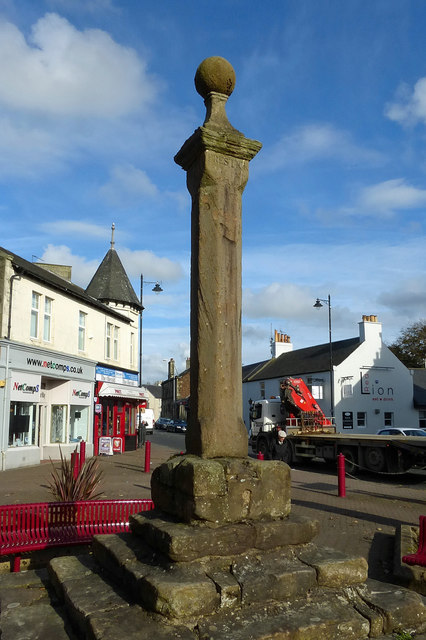
- Town Centre Prestwick Burgh Hall Main Street Prestwick Beach Prestwick Cross

- Location within South Ayrshire
- Population: 14,570 (2022)
- OS grid reference: NS349255
- Civil parish: Monkton and Prestwick
- Council area: South Ayrshire
- Lieutenancy area: Ayrshire and Arran
- Country: Scotland
- Sovereign state: United Kingdom
- Post town: PRESTWICK
- Postcode district: KA9
- Dialling code: 01292
- Police: Scotland
- Fire: Scottish
- Ambulance: Scottish
- UK Parliament: Central Ayrshire
- Scottish Parliament: Ayr

Prestwick (Scottish Gaelic: Preastabhaig) is a town and former royal burgh in South Ayrshire on the west coast of Scotland. It adjoins the larger town of Ayr to the south on the Firth of Clyde coast, the centre of which is about two miles (three kilometres) south, and the small village of Monkton to the north. It had a population of 14,570 in 2022. The town was the first home of the Open Golf Championship, which was played on the Prestwick Old Course from 1860 to 1872.

Glasgow Prestwick Airport is on the town's outskirts, providing passenger flights to European and, historically, transatlantic destinations as well as international cargo flights. Prestwick Academy is the towns only secondary school which, along with serving the town itself, serves the outlying villages of Symington and Monkton.

== History ==
Prestwick's name comes from the Old English for, priest's farm: preost meaning "priest" and wic meaning "farm". The town was originally an outlying farm of a religious house. George T. Flom suggested that the name was of Old Norse origin. In this case, it would mean "priest's bay".

Robert the Bruce is reputed to have been cured of leprosy by the waters of the well at St Ninians church. The well still exists behind the church.

Although it has been a Burgh of Barony for over a thousand years, it was a village until the railway arrived in the 1840s and the middle class from Glasgow started to build large houses along the coast. Prestwick Burgh Hall was completed in around 1837.

The Prestwick Bathing Lake, known as the Lido, was opened in 1931 by the Secretary of State for Scotland, William Adamson. It was the largest swimming pool north of the border. It could accommodate 1200 bathers and 3000 spectators. It hosted swimming galas, diving exhibitions, moonlight swimming sessions and regular fireworks displays and was the venue of some of the Miss Scotland competitions. It was closed in 1972 and subsequently demolished.

On 28 August 1944, a Douglas C-54 Skymaster (42-72171) of the United States Army Air Forces, on approach into Glasgow Prestwick Airport in bad weather, crashed into a residential area of Prestwick, killing all 20 passengers and crew and five people on the ground.

== Transport ==
=== Air travel ===
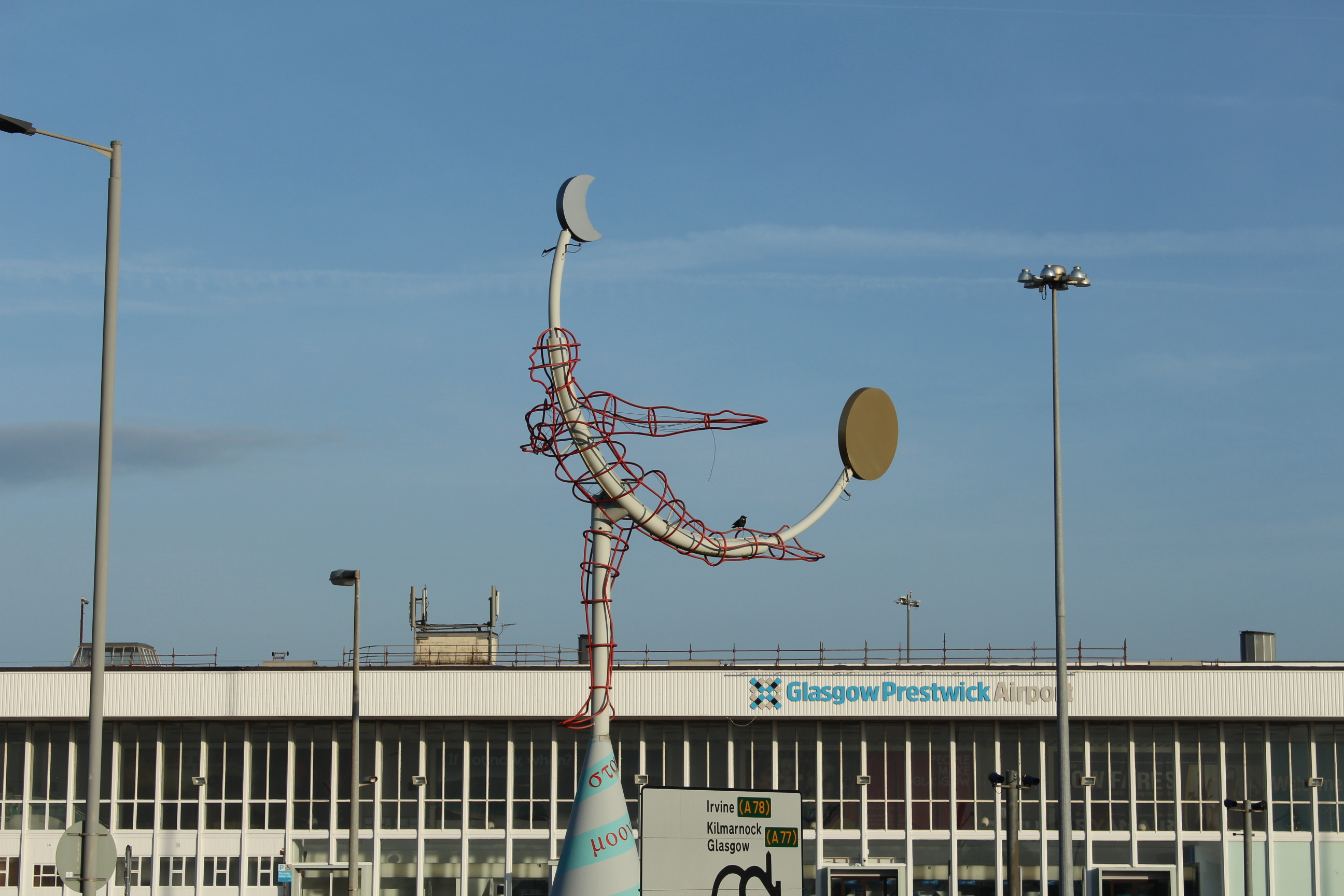
The town is served by Glasgow Prestwick Airport, an international airport opened in the 1930s.

Glasgow Prestwick Airport, formerly Prestwick International Airport, opened in the 1930s. The airport was a transatlantic gateway for over half a century. It lies close to, and was the last European re-fuelling way-point on, the Great Circle route from London via Thule in Greenland to San Francisco in the US; it is now no longer relevant for modern aircraft with non-stop range.

During World War II the US Army Air Corps had a base at the airport, and Elvis Presley set foot in the UK for the only time there on 3 March 1960, when his US Army transport aircraft stopped for refuelling en route from Germany.

Though a period of decline in the 1980s and 1990s saw it lose its status as Scotland's primary transatlantic airport, Prestwick continues to handle US military flights. In July 2005, the airport was the main transport hub for world leaders attending the G8 conference in Gleneagles. The airport now caters to one low-cost airline, Ryanair. In addition, BAE Systems, Goodrich Corporation, Spirit AeroSystems and GE Aircraft Engines have maintenance/manufacturing facilities adjacent to the airfield.

==== Navy station and NATS ====
Prestwick has a Royal Navy Air Station, also known as HMS Gannet, where Sea King search and rescue helicopters were stationed until the role was civilianised in January 2016.

Prestwick is a major air traffic control centre, with both the Scottish Air Traffic Control Centre (controlling 70% of UK airspace) and Prestwick Oceanic Area Control Centre (Shanwick Oceanic Control - responsible for air traffic over the eastern half of the North Atlantic) located at the NATS owned 'Scottish and Oceanic Area Control Centre'.

=== Bus and road ===
Prestwick is on the Ayrshire Coast Line between Glasgow Central and Ayr. Three trains per hour call at both Prestwick Town and Prestwick International Airport, with additional services at peak times. Glasgow is approximately 50 minutes from Prestwick by rail. The line continues south to the port of Stranraer on the Wigtownshire coast, but a change of trains at Ayr is usually required. The bus routes that run through Prestwick are usually run by Stagecoach Western including an express service to and from Glasgow known as the "X77".

The A79 road runs directly through the town, and is normally reached from the A77 trunk road between Glasgow and Stranraer, or from the A78 Ayrshire coastal route to Largs and Greenock.

== Landmarks ==
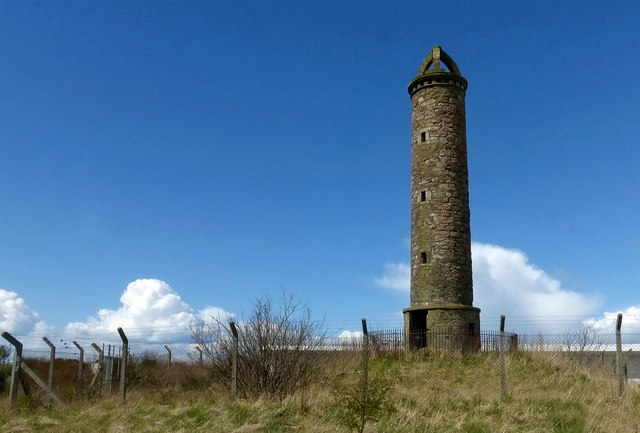
The Shaw Monument overlooks Prestwick Airport

The remains of the old parish church are located near Prestwick railway station. Thought to have originally been built in the 12th century, the small church building is now a ruin, and is surrounded by an ancient graveyard. Prestwick has a 1-mile-long (1.5-kilometre) esplanade alongside Prestwick Bay, part of the Firth of Clyde. It has two children's playgrounds. At the north end Kid'zplay, an indoor activity centre, can be found next to the large play-area that was formerly a large open air swimming pool. Parallel to the esplanade is a line of large houses overlooking Arran.

The Prestwick Old Course hosted the first Open Golf Championship in 1860. The first twelve Open Championships were played there, from 1860 to 1872. (the Championship was not played in 1871). The town also hosts two other golf courses, St. Nicholas and St. Cuthberts. St. Nicholas is a traditional links course south of the town. Prestwick St Ninians Golf Club was founded in 1912. The club continued until the 1950s.

The Shaw Monument stands on the high ground overlooking Prestwick Airport. On Ardayre Road in Prestwick is a Polish memorial. Its origins can be traced to a memorial erected by the Polish Air Force at Monkton. Discovered there in a dilapidated and vandalised condition, it was moved by Kyle and Carrick District Council in 1986 to its present site in the gardens of the RAFA Club which overlooks the sea. The memorial was repaired and placed on a new plinth. On 2 May 1987 the memorial was unveiled with a commemorative plaque by the Polish Naval, Air Force and Ex-Combattants' Associations. On the 45th anniversary of the sinking of the ORP Orkan (G90), 8 October 1988, another commemorative plaque was installed in memory of the Polish Navy, Merchant Navy and Coastal Command airmen who died in the Battle of the Atlantic. On Polish Navy Day (10 February) at the memorial, in a service that both Polish and Scottish ex-servicemen participate in, the memories of those that perished are remembered in a spirit of friendship and comradeship between Polish and Scottish ex-servicemen.

The Oval is a public park in the centre of Prestwick with two full size football pitches with indoor changing rooms, a tennis centre with three indoor courts and eight outdoor, a 25m indoor swimming pool and gym, indoor bowling green and cricket club. The park was gifted to the town in 1954.

== Demography ==
=== Education ===
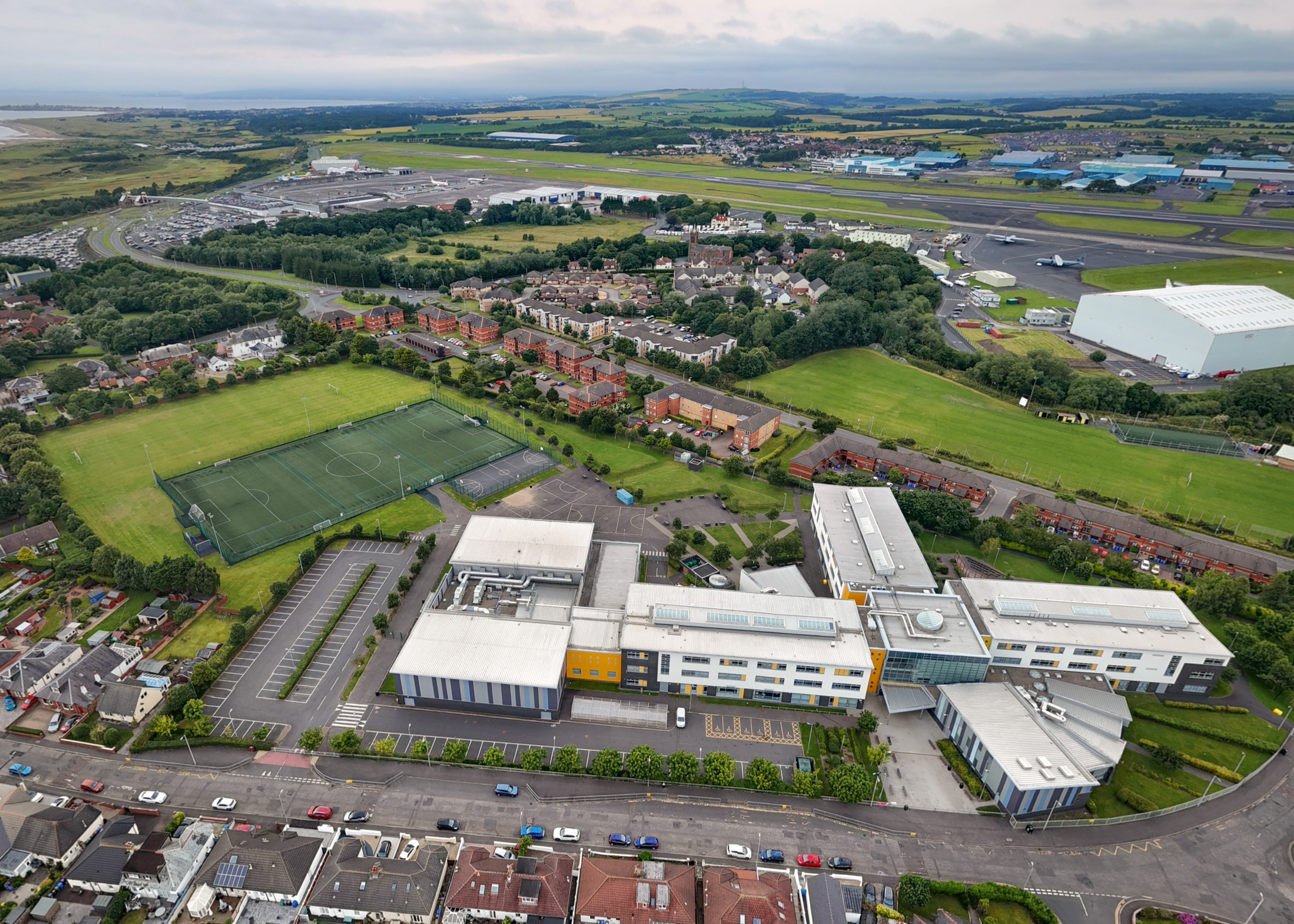
Prestwick Academy is the town's only secondary school.

Prestwick has five schools, four primary and one secondary, one of which is a denominational school, serving Prestwick and north of Prestwick. The schools are:

- Prestwick Academy
- Glenburn Primary
- Kingcase Primary
- St. Ninian's Primary: denominational (Catholic) Primary
- Heathfield Primary: Officially in Ayr, on border of Prestwick and Ayr

Prestwick Academy is a secondary school fed by all these primary schools. St. Ninian's pupils can go on to Queen Margaret Academy or Prestwick Academy. The primary schools in the outlying villages of Monkton and Symington also 'feed' the secondary school.

=== Population ===
The population of Prestwick in 2022 was 14,570 inhabitants; the civil parish of Monkton and Prestwick has a population of 14,261.

=== Locality ===
Prestwick is geographically split into two main areas by the Main Street running parallel to the railway line. Most people live on the east side of Main Street. Here there is a mixture of council and private housing. The main neighbourhoods on the east of the Main Street are Shawfarm, Marchburn, Glenburn, Powmill, Kingcase, Moorfield and East Road/Kings Meadow. On the west side of the Main Street is a mixture of council, privately owned, rented and hotel/B & B accommodation.

=== Geography and climate ===
Prestwick has an oceanic climate (Köppen: Cfb).

Climate data for Prestwick, Gannet (27 m or 89 ft asl, averages 1991–2020)
Month	Jan	Feb	Mar	Apr	May	Jun	Jul	Aug	Sep	Oct	Nov	Dec	Year
Record high °C (°F)	14.1 (57.4)	15.8 (60.4)	19.0 (66.2)	24.1 (75.4)	27.4 (81.3)	30.8 (87.4)	31.3 (88.3)	29.3 (84.7)	27.6 (81.7)	20.9 (69.6)	17.8 (64.0)	14.4 (57.9)	31.3 (88.3)
Mean daily maximum °C (°F)	7.5 (45.5)	7.9 (46.2)	9.5 (49.1)	12.1 (53.8)	15.1 (59.2)	17.3 (63.1)	18.7 (65.7)	18.5 (65.3)	16.6 (61.9)	13.3 (55.9)	10.1 (50.2)	7.9 (46.2)	12.9 (55.2)
Daily mean °C (°F)	4.9 (40.8)	5.1 (41.2)	6.3 (43.3)	8.4 (47.1)	11.1 (52.0)	13.6 (56.5)	15.3 (59.5)	15.1 (59.2)	13.3 (55.9)	10.3 (50.5)	7.3 (45.1)	5.1 (41.2)	9.7 (49.5)
Mean daily minimum °C (°F)	2.2 (36.0)	2.2 (36.0)	3.2 (37.8)	4.7 (40.5)	7.0 (44.6)	9.9 (49.8)	11.8 (53.2)	11.7 (53.1)	10.0 (50.0)	7.2 (45.0)	4.4 (39.9)	2.3 (36.1)	6.4 (43.5)
Record low °C (°F)	−10.6 (12.9)	−7.0 (19.4)	−6.8 (19.8)	−4.8 (23.4)	−3.1 (26.4)	1.5 (34.7)	4.8 (40.6)	2.6 (36.7)	−1.2 (29.8)	−5.4 (22.3)	−8.7 (16.3)	−11.2 (11.8)	−11.2 (11.8)
Average precipitation mm (inches)	96.3 (3.79)	74.7 (2.94)	70.2 (2.76)	57.7 (2.27)	54.6 (2.15)	65.3 (2.57)	82.2 (3.24)	87.6 (3.45)	79.1 (3.11)	106.4 (4.19)	102.7 (4.04)	104.0 (4.09)	980.8 (38.61)
Average precipitation days (≥ 1.0 mm)	16.5	14.2	12.9	11.7	10.7	11.5	12.9	13.4	12.9	15.3	16.2	16.5	164.6
Mean monthly sunshine hours	39.7	70.0	105.8	161.0	211.2	179.2	174.6	159.6	120.6	86.7	54.4	37.9	1,400.6
Source 1: Met Office
Source 2: Starlings Roost Weather

== Governance ==
Prestwick lies within the South Ayrshire Council area. Prestwick is part of the Ayr Scottish parliamentary constituency which has been represented by SNP MSP Siobhian Brown since the 2021 Scottish Parliament election. The constituency also incorporates the towns of Ayr and Troon. At Westminster, Prestwick forms part of the Central Ayrshire constituency. It is represented by Scottish Labour MP Alan Gemmell: the constituency extends north into Troon and rural South Ayrshire and further north into Irvine and part of Kilwinning in North Ayrshire.

=== Councillors ===
Four Councillors currently represent the Prestwick ward as part of South Ayrshire Council.

Ward	Councillors	Party
Prestwick	Hugh Hunter	Independent
Prestwick	Martin Kilbride	Scottish Conservative Party
Prestwick	Ian Cochrane	Scottish National Party
Prestwick	Cameron Ramsay	Scottish Labour Party

== Culture ==
=== Sports ===
St. Ninian's Park, nicknamed The Oval, is a public park located in the centre, and consists of 2 full size football pitches with indoor changing rooms, a tennis centre with 3 indoor courts and 8 outdoor, a 25m indoor swimming pool and gym, indoor bowling green and cricket club. Famous sportspeople from Prestwick are footballers Bob Anderson, Craig Conway, James Forrest, Giovanni Moscardini, Andrew Thomson, footballer turned MP Ian Welsh, professional wrestler Drew McIntyre, professional golfer William McGowan and figure skater Lewis Gibson.

=== Golf ===
Prestwick Golf Club is a classic links golf course, built on the rolling sandy land between the beach and the hinterland. The course is near the Prestwick airport, and some holes run along railway tracks on the eastern side of the course. The Open Championship originated at the club, and was played there 24 times between 1860 and 1925.

== Notable people ==
See also: Category:People from Prestwick

- Jenny Colgan (born 1971), writer on Doctor Who.
- Ian Bargh (1935–2012), jazz pianist and composer.
- Alan Forrest (born 1996), footballer for Dundee F.C. since 2026.
- Peter Howson (born 1958), painter.
- Elizabeth G. K. Hewat (1895–1968), the first woman to graduate BD and PhD at New Collage, University of Edinburgh.
- John Keppie (1862–1945), architect and artist.
- Ciara Torrance (born 1999), badminton player.

== Town twinning ==
Prestwick is twinned with:

- Lichtenfels, Bavaria, Germany
- Vandalia, Ohio, United States
- Ariccia, Lazio, Italy
