= The Oval (Prestwick) =

Public park in Prestwick, South Ayrshire, Scotland

St Ninian's Park (The Oval)
- Interactive map of St Ninian's Park (The Oval)
- Type: Public park
- Location: Prestwick, Scotland
- Coordinates: 55°29′35″N 4°36′41″W
- Area: 11.5 hectares (28 acres)
- Created: 1954
- Operator: South Ayrshire Council
- Status: Open all year

St. Ninian's Park (more commonly known as The Oval) is a public park located in the centre of Prestwick, South Ayrshire. The Park was created in 1954 on a site in the centre of Prestwick, previously occupied by farmland. The public park consists of 2 full size football pitches with indoor changing rooms, a tennis centre with 3 indoor courts and 8 outdoor, a 25m indoor swimming pool and gym, indoor bowling green and cricket club.
