= Prestwick Burgh Hall =

Municipal building in Prestwick, Scotland

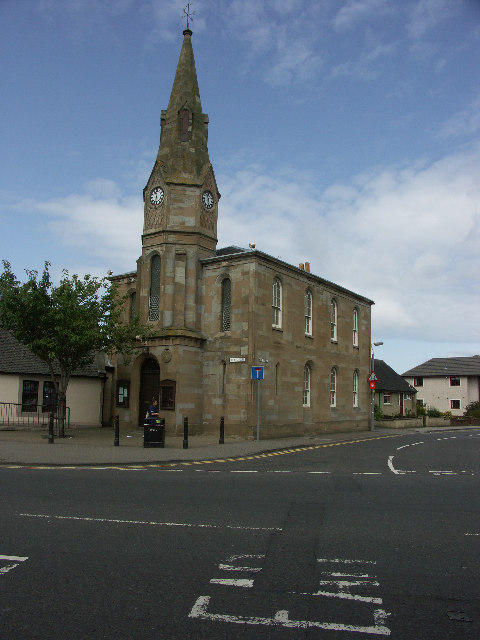
- Prestwick Burgh Hall in 2004 before the steeple was dismantled

- Shown in South Ayrshire
- 55.5021°N 4.6105°W
- Location: Kirk Street, Prestwick

History
- Built: 1837

Site notes
- Architectural style: Gothic Revival style

Listed Building – Category B
- Official name: Old Burgh Chambers (now County Council District Office)
- Designated: 14 April 1971
- Reference no.: LB40329

Prestwick Burgh Hall, also known as Prestwick Freeman's Hall and Prestwick Freemen's Hall, is a municipal building in Kirk Street, Prestwick, Scotland. The structure, which served as the meeting place of Prestwick Burgh Council, is a Category B listed building.

== History ==
The first municipal building in Prestwick was an early 18th century tolbooth. The tolbooth was used as the offices and meeting place of the chancellor and the two bailies who administered the town: they were elected annually by the 36 freemen of the burgh who owned 1,000 acres (400 ha) of land in and around the town. The current building was commissioned by the freemen of Prestwick for use as the local burgh school. It was designed in the Gothic Revival style, built in ashlar stone and was completed in 1837.

The design involved a symmetrical main frontage with three bays facing onto the corner of The Cross and Kirk Street; the central bay, which projected forward, featured a porch with an arched doorway and an octagonal tower above. The tower was fenestrated with a lancet window on the first floor and featured a clock face in the stage above which was surmounted by a spire. There were lancet windows in the outer bays. The ground floor was initially used as a prison and the first floor was used by the burgh school which accommodated some 60 children.

By the late 19th century the burgh council had assumed most of the functions of the freemen and the building had become the burgh hall. It continued in that use until the burgh council established the municipal buildings in Links Road in the late 1930s. The former burgh hall was then acquired by Ayrshire County Council and became their local district offices.

After the steeple was found to be structurally unsound, it was removed in 2011: a firm of consultants advised that it should be rebuilt using new masonry and that the original stone should be used as template. Although residents lobbied for it to be restored South Ayrshire Council failed to attract support from the Heritage Lottery Fund, or any other charitable source, to carry out the necessary works.

== See also ==
- List of listed buildings in Prestwick, South Ayrshire
