= Queen Margaret Academy =

Queen Margaret Academy Acadamh banrigh Maighread
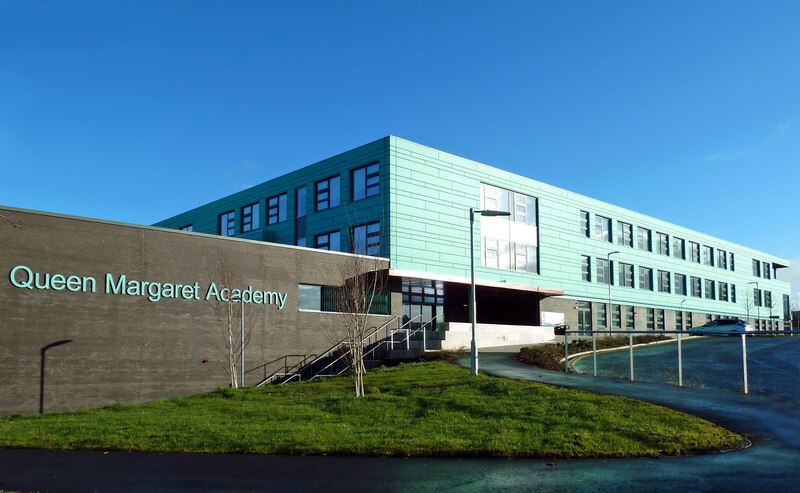
- School badge Queen Margaret Academy building

Location
- Dalmellington Road, Ayr, South Ayrshire, Scotland; 55.4413°N 4.6034°W

Information
- Type: State co–educational secondary school
- Motto: Omne Opus Bonum
- Established: 1856; as St. Margaret's School; 1966; as Queen Margaret Academy
- Educational authority: South Ayrshire Council
- Head teacher: Katie Schlesiger
- Staff: 60 (approx)
- Years: S1–S6
- Age range: 11 to 18
- Enrollment: 596 (2019-20)
- Colours: Blue red gold
- Feeder schools: Sacred Heart (Girvan), St Cuthbert's (Maybole), St John's (Ayr), St Ninian's (Prestwick) and St Patrick's (Troon) Primaries
- Website: Queen Margaret Academy

Queen Margaret Academy (Scottish Gaelic: àrd-sgoil/Acadamh banrigh Maighread) is a Roman Catholic secondary school in the south of Ayr in southwest Scotland. Queen Margaret Academy is the fifth largest secondary school in South Ayrshire, with a total of 680 pupils enrolled at the school in 2023–2024. The school is the responsibility of South Ayrshire Council, the local authority, with its head teacher, Katie Schlesiger, assuming the daily responsibility for the running and delivery of education across the school.

Established in 1856 as St. Margaret's School, Queen Margaret Academy was formed in 1966 and became a state-run school overseen by South Ayrshire Council. Queen Margaret Academy takes Catholic children aged 11 to 18 from the whole of South Ayrshire and parts of East Ayrshire.

== History ==
=== St Margaret's School, 1856 ===
The origins of the school can be traced back to 1831, when the first attempts were made to establish a school to educate Catholic children in Ayr. The original St Margaret's school was founded in 1856 on the site of what is now St Margaret's Church Hall in Elba Street, Ayr. Administered by the church authorities, money was tight, resources scant and discipline harsh. Years of determined hard work saw standards and pupil numbers rise.

In 1893 the school moved to Whitletts Road, adjacent to Craigie Park, where over seventy-three years it developed from a purely primary to a combined primary and secondary school. An additional building and huts were erected in the early 20th century to cope with the rising school roll. After the Second World War such was the overcrowding that St Catherine's Primary School was built at Dalmilling to relieve the pressure. However, by February 1962 the lack of accommodation was still a serious problem. A fire destroyed one of the main buildings in the October of that year.

=== Queen Margaret Academy, 1966 ===
In August 1966, the secondary department moved to a new building in Mainholm Road, adjacent to Mainholm Academy, and was renamed Queen Margaret Academy; the primary department remained at Whitletts Road and was renamed St John's Primary School. When the lower school leaving age rose to 16, both Queen Margaret and Mainholm Academies outgrew their accommodation. Consequently, it was decided that Mainholm Academy should also occupy the entire site on Mainholm Road, and a new building be constructed to house the pupils of Queen Margaret Academy. Initially the site of the current Kyle Academy was considered, but felt to be too small.

The school moved into a new buildings in Dalmellington Road in January 1976, and they were officially opened in 1977. Based on an experimental design, the teaching areas are located in one building with large open plan areas across for study and learning. The PE facilities, crush hall and dinner are in a separate building linked by a covered walkway. Attached to the school is the South Ayrshire Supported Learning Centre, which caters for pupils with specific educational needs.

==== New school building ====
In January 2016 First Minister Nicola Sturgeon visited the school to announce that a new building would be constructed to replace the current building. Construction began to the left of the site in December 2017 with the demolition of the Dance Area. The new building opened to pupils on 24 October 2019.

== School profile ==
Queen Margaret Academy was (as of 2011) in the top 50 (out of an approx total of 376) performing schools in Scotland. The school motto is Omne Opus Bonum which is Latin for every good work. The arms were granted to the school in February 1955.

== Head Teacher ==
Following the retirement of Antony Flynn as head teacher, in February 2018, Oonagh Browne, Depute Head Teacher at nearby Kyle Academy, was appointed head teacher of Queen Margaret Academy. In April 2025, it was announced that Browne would leave her position at Queen Margaret Academy to take up the post of head teacher at Prestwick Academy.

=== List of Head Teachers ===
- Mr Bridget Gray (1856–1869)
- Miss Bridget Bird (1869–1874)
- Miss Annie McLaughlin (1874–1878)
- Miss Johanna Parker (1878–1880)
- Miss Agnes Eugenie Card (1880–1882)
- Miss Margaret Gibson (1883)
- Miss Mary Cairns (1883–1885)
- Miss Annie McDonald (1885–1888)
- Mrs Flora MacDonald (1888–1894)
- Miss Catherine MacDonald (1894)
- Mr James McGrorry (1894–1899)
- Mr Laurence Gemson (1899–1933) – Longest serving headteacher. Founder and director of Ayr United in 1910. Manager of the team, 1915–18.
- Mr Joseph H. Daly (1933–1954) – Died suddenly in office, 1954.
- Mr James McGloin (1954–1976) – Pioneer of schools broadcasting.
- Mr Robert Jardine (1977–1990)
- Mr Daniel Boyle (1990–1996)
- Mr Ian McEwan (1996–2007)
- Mrs Moira Gray (2007–2012)
- Mr Antony Flynn (2012–2018)
- Mrs Oonagh Browne (2018–2025)
- Mrs Katie Schlesiger (2025–present)

== Alumni and former pupils ==
- Jenny Colgan (b. 1972) - author (her father was a teacher of Technical and Guidance in the school)
- David Watson (b. 2005) - footballer, Kilmarnock F.C.
