= The International Ayrshow - Festival Of Flight =

Airshow in Scotland

- Status: Revived For 2023 - Previously Scottish International Airshow
- Genre: Airshow
- Dates: 4 September 2026 - 5 September 2026
- Frequency: Yearly
- Venue: Ayr Low Green
- Location: Ayr, Scotland
- Country: Scotland
- Established: 2014
- Attendance: ~ 90,000 Public Visitors
- Major events: Trade Exhibition Aerobatic Displays Static Displays
- Organiser: South Ayrshire Council
- Website: https://destinationsouthayrshire.co.uk/ayrshow/

The International Ayrshow - Festival Of Flight is an airshow that takes place in Ayr, Scotland.

== History ==
The new airshow was organised by South Ayrshire Council.

This new festival was not linked to the previous organisers of TSIA and was a wholly new venture for 2023.

The Festival Of Flight took place between Friday 8 September and Sunday 10 September 2023, with the main airshow taking place on Saturday 9 September at the Low Green, Ayr.

It has been announced that South Ayrshire Council have started planning the 2024 airshow.

== Venue ==
The International Ayrshow - Festival Of Flight is held in Ayr, with the main airshow taking place along the coastline.

== Experience ==
As well as the flying elements of the event, also included are various food stands, market style stalls selling memorabilia and aviation related merchandise, charity fundraising patrons, Funfair Rides and exhibitions from the British Armed Forces and Police Scotland.

== Aircraft ==
2023 Aircraft

- Battle Of Britain Memorial Flight
- RAF Red Arrows Aerobatics Display Team
- Royal Air Force Typhoon
- OV-10 Bronco
- BAC Strikemaster

2024 aircraft:

Battle of Britain Memorial Flight

Typhoon display team

2025 Aircraft

- French Air and Space Force Équipe de Voltige de l’Armée de l’Air (EVAA)
- Belgian Air Component
- Battle Of Britain Memorial Flight
- RAF Red Arrows Aerobatics Display Team
- Royal Air Force Typhoon
