= Kyle Academy =

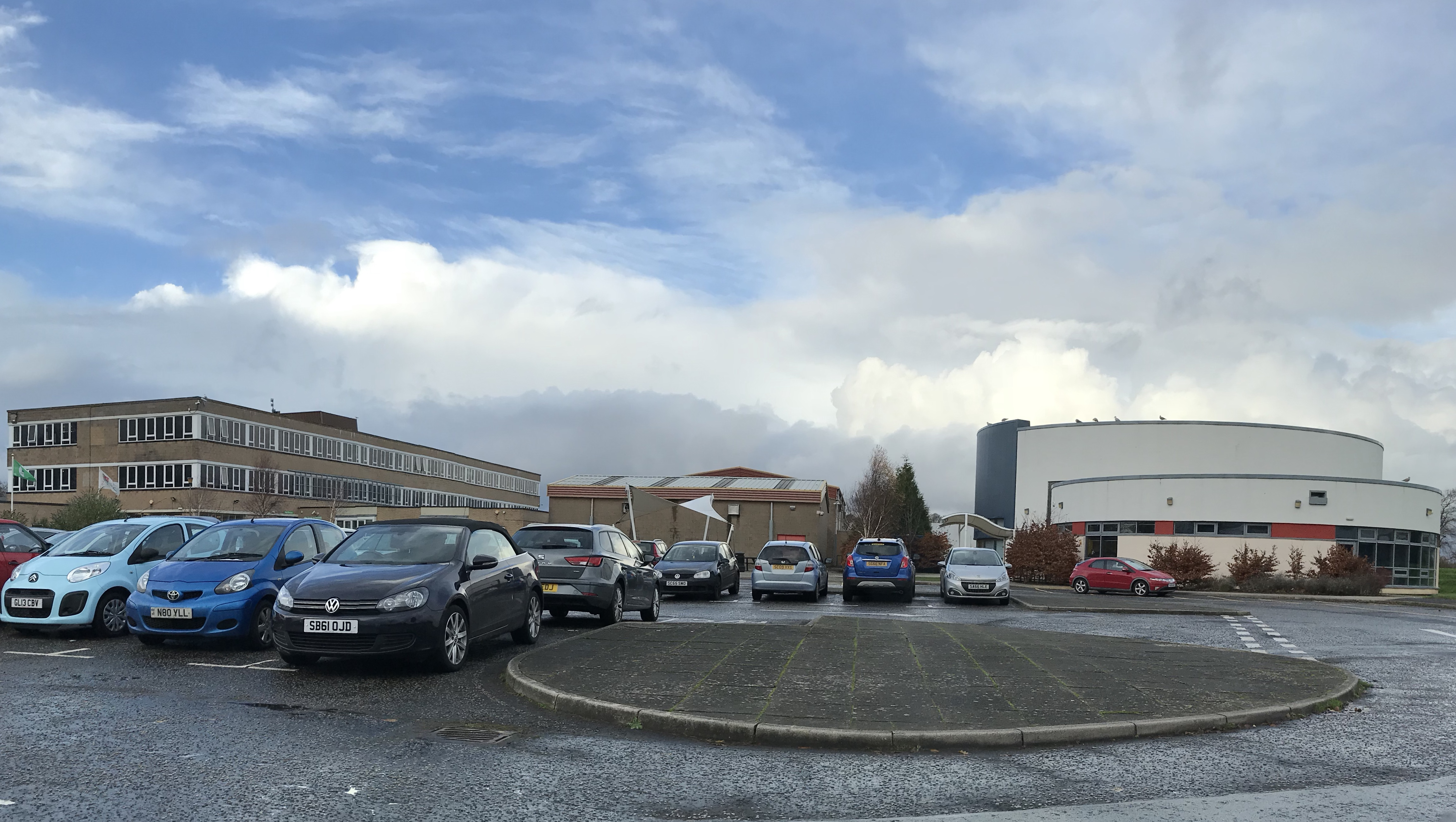
- From left to right: Main teaching block (left), gym hall (centre), auditorium extension (right) School badge

Location
- Overmills Road, Ayr, South Ayrshire, Scotland, KA7 3LS; 55.4574°N 4.5994°W

Information
- Type: 11–18 non-denominational secondary school
- Motto: Cultivate Excellence
- Established: August 1979
- Local authority: South Ayrshire Council
- Head Teacher: Mary Byrne
- Years: S1–S6
- Gender: Boys and girls
- Age: 11 to 18
- Enrolment: 837 (2023–2024)
- Colour
- Affiliation: Forehill Primary School; Grammar Primary School; Wallacetown Early Years Centre; Forehill Early Years Centre
- Website: Kyle Academy

Kyle Academy is an 11–18 non-denominational secondary school in Ayr, serving the south east of Ayr in South Ayrshire. It is the fourth largest secondary school in South Ayrshire, with 824 pupils enrolled at the school in 2023–2024. The school is the responsibility of South Ayrshire Council, with current head teacher Mary Byrne assuming the daily responsibility of the school's affairs and direction. The school forms part of the Kyle Cluster, together with Forehill Primary School, Forehill Early Years Centre, Grammar Primary School & Early Years Centre and Wallacetown Early Years Centre.

Kyle Academy ranked as the 33rd best state school in Scotland in 2017, and is regarded as one of the best performing secondary schools in South Ayrshire. By 2020, Kyle Academy had dropped in its ranks to the 59th best performing state school in Scotland, and in 2022 dropped further to 92nd.

== History and locality ==
The school officially opened in August 1979 with a total of 154 pupils enrolled in S1. By 1984, Kyle Academy had achieved full sixth year educational status. The school campus has accommodation for 852 pupils, and as of August 2025, a total of 837 pupils are enrolled at the school across S1–S6. Its main feeder schools are Forehill Primary and Ayr Grammar Primary.

The school building itself is situated next to the River Ayr, west of the A77 trunk road. Prior to becoming the site of Kyle Academy, the site was rural and farm land and at some period in its history the land was used for mining. In addition, there was also a dye works and fever hospital in the vicinity close to where Kyle Academy is now situated. Nearby, the Kyle Union poorhouse in Ayr was built in 1857–1860 on Holmston Road, with the first Governor and Matron being appointed in April 1860. The buildings provided accommodation for 150 inmates.

As part of South Ayrshire's public–private partnership, an extension was constructed in 2007. The separate new annex holds a 300-seat, multimedia equipped assembly hall/theatre, e-learning suite and meeting rooms, shows can often be performed here.

== Accommodation ==
The accommodation provided for pupils attending Kyle Academy is described to be of "a good standard". The main curriculum learning and teaching areas are housed within the main three storey Classroom Block, which includes specialist provision for Science, Languages, Business Studies, Computing, Home Economics and Art. This section of the school building is linked by a corridor passing through the administration block to the Physical Education Block comprising a gymnasium and games hall.

Technology across the school is described as "very good", with nine well-equipped computer suites, with two for usage by Design and Technology, two for Business Studies and two for Computing, one in Pupil Support, one for general use and an e-learning suite. All classrooms across the school have access to computing facilities and interactive boards within classrooms. Within the school grounds, there are two rugby pitches, two hockey pitches, two football pitches and a hard court which is used for netball.

== Overview ==
Kyle Academy has a large staff consisting of a senior leadership team of one head teacher and three depute head teachers, 16 principal teachers (curriculum), four principal teachers of guidance, and one principal teacher of pupil support. The percentage of young people at Kyle Academy with a free school meals entitlement is 8.1%. Attendance is broadly in line with local South Ayrshire and national figures across Scotland. Exclusions of students at Kyle Academy are below local and national averages.

It is part of the Kyle Cluster with associated schools, Grammar Primary School, Forehill Primary School & Early Years Centre and Wallacetown Early Years Centre. Kyle Academy was last inspected by Education Scotland in March 2013. The report was published in June 2013.

== Performance ==
=== National ===
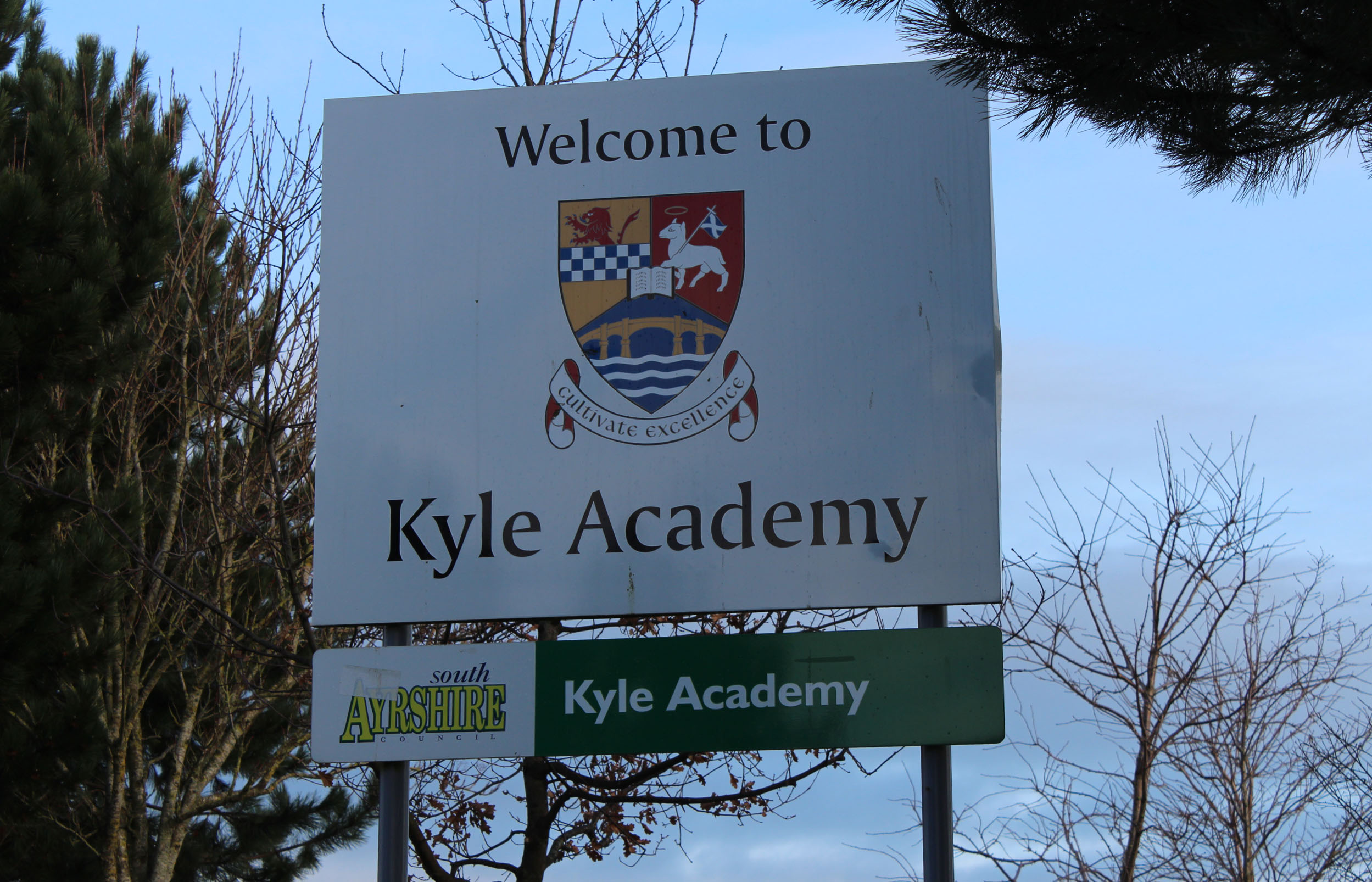
Welcome to Kyle Academy sign at the main entrance

In 2017, Kyle Academy was ranked as the 33rd best state school in Scotland. Kyle Academy was one of two secondary schools in South Ayrshire to rank within the top 50 – Marr College in Troon was ranked at 38.

Progress in secondary schools in Scotland is measured using national benchmarking measures from Education Scotland and is based on information related to school leavers rather than year groups. The results achieved by pupils in Kyle Academy are compared to the results of a virtual comparator used across Scotland. A virtual comparator is determined by the Scottish Government who is responsible for selecting at random 10 pupils from across Scotland with similar characteristics to pupils. This is done for every pupil in S4 to S6 in Kyle Academy. This enables a fair comparison with pupils of similar needs and backgrounds from across Scotland.

According to their a 2019-20 school report, their students perform "significantly higher than young people of similar needs and backgrounds across Scotland" in literacy and numeracy assessments.

=== Attainment ===
The following tables are indicative of the schools performance both overtime in attainment, as well as attainment in the core subjects of literacy and numeracy from 2019. A virtual comparator is used against school data, and is determined by the Scottish Government who select 10 pupils at random from other secondary schools across Scotland with similar characteristics to pupils attending the school.

==== Literacy and numeracy ====
% of leavers achieving SCQF Level 4 and SCQF level 5 in literacy and numeracy
All Leavers	Year	% Level 4 Literacy & Numeracy	% Level 5 Literacy & Numeracy
Kyle Academy	2022	97.4	77.4
Virtual Comparator	2022	91.3	71.2
Kyle Academy	2021	93.84	81.51
Virtual Comparator	2021	91.99	74.52
Kyle Academy	2020	95.56	83.7
Virtual Comparator	2020	92.52	72.74
Kyle Academy	2019	96.12	76.74
Virtual Comparator	2019	90.16	66.43

==== Attainment over time ====
% of leavers with qualifications attained
SCQF Qualification	Level 3	% Level 4	National 5	Higher	Advanced Higher
1 or more (Kyle Academy)	98.7%	98.1%	92.9%	66.5%	22.6%
1 or more (Virtual Comparator)	98.4%	97.4%	87.6%	65.9%	24.7%
3 or more (Kyle Academy)	98.7%	97.4%	80.0%	58.1%	3.9%
3 or more (Virtual Comparator)	94.7%	92.3%	77.3%	50.3%	0%
5 or more (Kyle Academy)	96.8%	94.2%	70.3%	38.7%	3.9%
5 or more (Virtual Comparator)	89.0%	86.1%	64.2%	35.7%	0%

== Notable former pupils ==
- Katy Clark, politician
- Ryan Stevenson, footballer
