= South Ayrshire Council elections =

Local government elections in South Ayrshire, Scotland

South Ayrshire Council in Scotland holds elections every five years, previously holding them every four years from its creation as a single-tier authority in 1995 to 2007.

== Council elections ==
Year	Conservative	SNP	Labour	Independent
1995	4	0	21	0
1999 (Note: New ward boundaries.)	13	0	17	0
2003	15	0	15	0
2007 (Note: Change to single transferable vote system and new ward boundaries.)	12	8	9	1
2012	10	9	9	2
2017 (Note: New ward boundaries.)	12	9	5	2
2022	10	9	5	4

== Results maps ==
1995 results map

1999 results map

2003 results map

2007 results map

2012 results map

2017 results map

2022 results map

== By-elections ==
=== 2003-2007 ===
Dundonald and Loans By-Election 15 January 2004
Party	Candidate	Votes	%	±%
Conservative	Arthur Spurling	1,072	55.8	+2.4
Labour	Sandra Marshall	506	26.4	−1.1
SNP	Nan McFarlane	242	12.6	−6.5
Liberal Democrats	Stuart Ritchie	100	5.2	+5.2
Majority		566	29.5	
Turnout		1,920		
Conservative hold		Swing		

North Carrick and Maybole East By-Election 2 February 2006
Party	Candidate	Votes	%	±%
Independent	Brian Connolly	408	27.7	+27.7
Conservative	Ann Galbraith	407	27.6	−0.4
Labour	Sandra Goldie	342	23.2	−23.7
SNP	William McCubbin	316	21.5	+1.0
Majority		1	0.1	
Turnout		1,473		
Independent gain from Labour		Swing		

=== 2012-2017 ===
Ayr East By-Election 17 September 2015
Party	Candidate	FPv%	Count			
Party	Candidate	FPv%	1	2	3	4
SNP	John Wallace	38.0	1,507	1,540	1,600	1,775
Conservative	Dan McCroskrie	38.5	1,527	1,534	1,589	1,740
Labour	Susan Wilson	16.2	642	654	708	
Independent	Andrew Bryden	5.5	218	227		
Green	Boyd Murdoch	1.9	76			
SNP hold						
Valid: 3,970 Spoilt: 36 Quota: 1,986 Turnout: 4,006

=== 2022-2027 ===
Girvan and South Carrick By-Election 21 September 2023
Party	Candidate	FPv%	Count			
Party	Candidate	FPv%	1	2	3	4
Conservative	Alan Lamont	47.5	1,315	1,323	1,346	1,497
SNP	Joseph McLaughlin	28.1	778	802	824	947
Labour	Nicola Saxton	18.0	499	507	551	
Liberal Democrats	Jamie Ross	3.9	108	113		
Alba	Denise Sommerville	2.5	70			
Conservative gain from Labour						
Valid: 2,770 Spoilt: 32 Quota: 1,386 Turnout: 2,802

Ayr North By-Election 16 October 2025
Party	Candidate	FPv%	Count							
Party	Candidate	FPv%	1	2	3	4	5	6	7	8
Independent	Wullie Hogg	25.1	850	864	871	924	952	1,138	1,325	1,699
SNP	Ian Douglas	23.3	790	802	818	835	847	898	1,075	
Labour	John Duncan	20.4	691	696	713	738	775	830		
Reform	Andrew Russell	17.2	584	584	589	607	642			
Conservative	David Paterson	5.7	195	196	199	211				
Independent	David Petrie	4.5	151	157	160					
Liberal Democrats	Mason Graham	2.1	73	74						
Independent	Orhan Bulikj	1.5	51							
Independent hold										
Valid: 3,385 Spoilt: 37 Quota: 1,693 Turnout: 3,422
