= Carrick, Cumnock and Doon Valley (Scottish Parliament constituency) =

Region or constituency of the Scottish Parliament

- County constituency for the Scottish Parliament
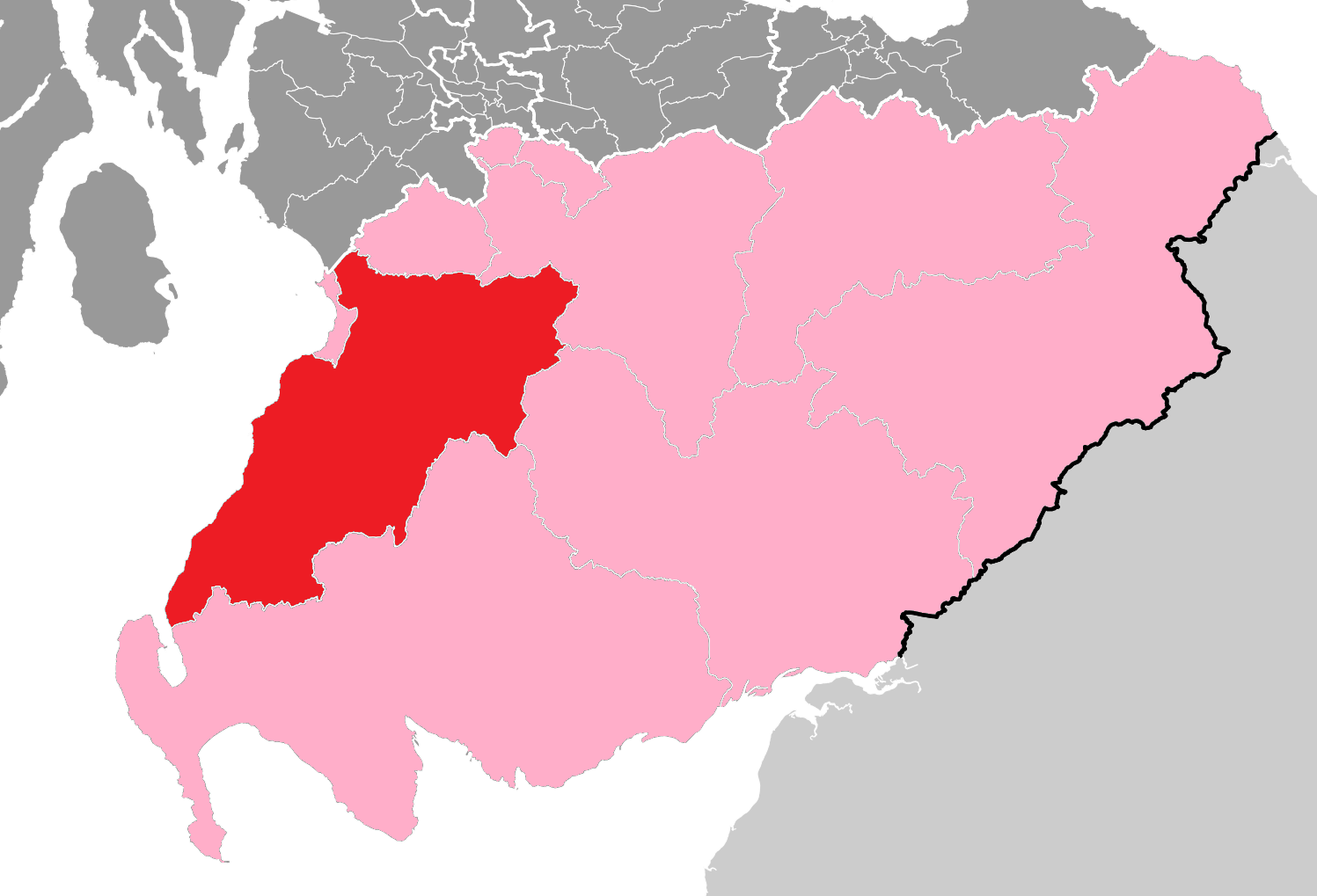

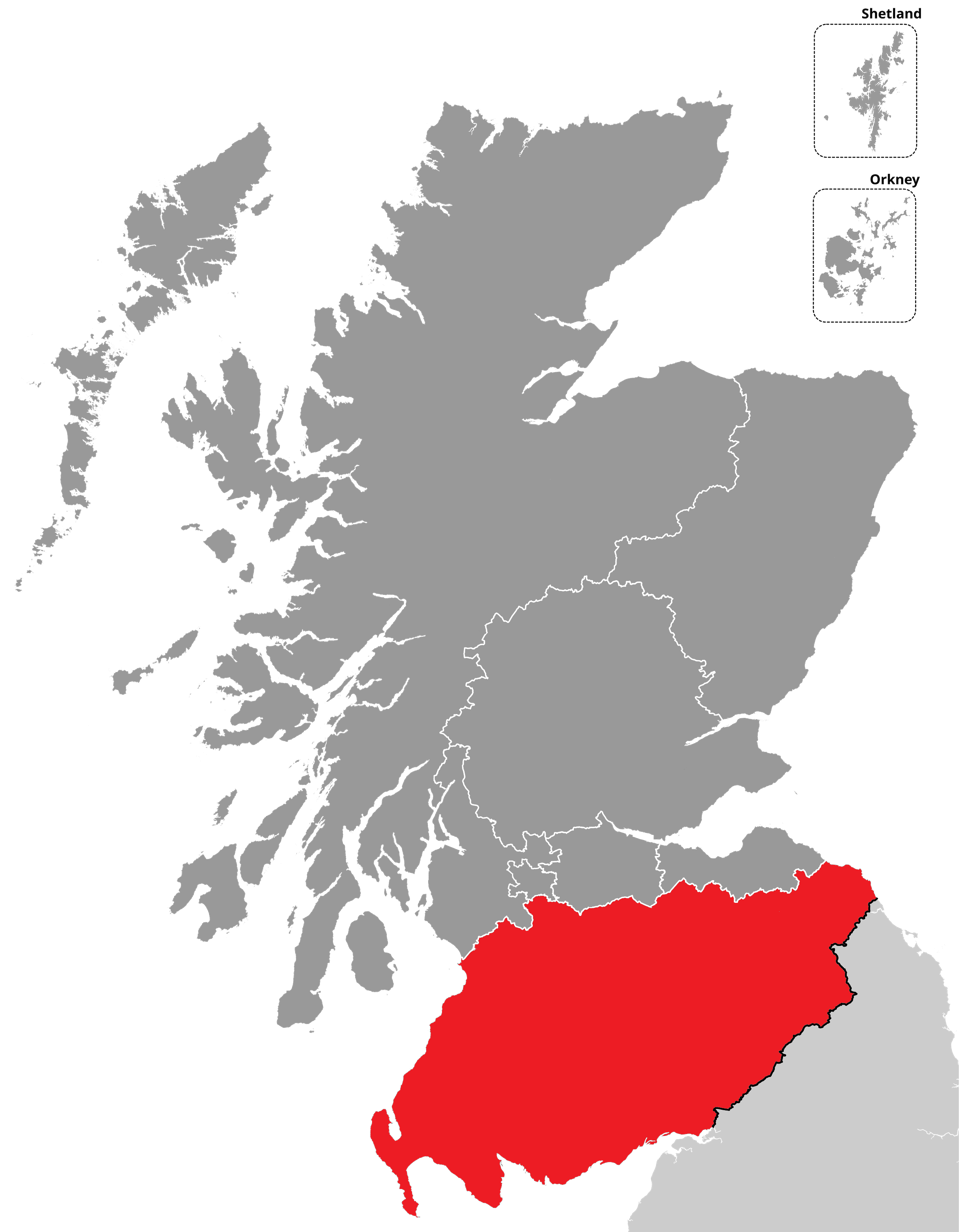
- Carrick, Cumnock and Doon Valley shown within the South Scotland electoral region and the region shown within Scotland
- Electoral region: South Scotland
- Electorate: 59,417 (2026)

Current constituency
- Created: 1999
- Party: Scottish National Party
- MSP: Katie Hagmann
- Council area: East Ayrshire; South Ayrshire

Carrick, Cumnock and Doon Valley (Gaelic: Carraig, Cumnaig agus Srath Dhùn) is a county constituency of the Scottish Parliament at Holyrood, covering parts of the council areas of South Ayrshire and East Ayrshire. Under the additional-member electoral system used for elections to the Scottish Parliament, it elects one Member of the Scottish Parliament (MSP) by the first past the post method of election. It is also one of ten constituencies in the South Scotland electoral region, which elects seven additional members, in addition to the ten constituency MSPs, to produce a form of proportional representation for the region as a whole.

The seat has been held by Katie Hagmann of the Scottish National Party since the 2026 Scottish Parliament election.

== Electoral region ==
Following the second periodic review of Scottish Parliament boundaries in 2025, the other nine constituencies of the South Scotland region are: Ayr; Clydesdale; Dumfriesshire; East Kilbride; Ettrick, Roxburgh and Berwickshire; Galloway and West Dumfries; Hamilton, Larkhall and Stonehouse; Kilmarnock and Irvine Valley; and Midlothian South, Tweeddale and Lauderdale. The region covers the whole of the council areas of Dumfries and Galloway, Scottish Borders, and South Ayrshire council areas; and parts of the council areas of East Ayrshire, Midlothian, and South Lanarkshire. By population it is now the largest of Scotland's eight electoral regions.

Prior to the 2025 review, there were nine constituencies in the South Scotland region. Besides Carrick, Cumnock and Doon Valley, the other eight constituencies were: Ayr; Clydesdale; Dumfriesshire; East Lothian; Ettrick, Roxburgh and Berwickshire; Galloway and West Dumfries; Kilmarnock and Irvine Valley; and Midlothian South, Tweeddale and Lauderdale. The region covered the Dumfries and Galloway, East Ayrshire, Scottish Borders and South Ayrshire council areas in full and parts of the East Lothian, Midlothian and South Lanarkshire council areas.

== Constituency boundaries and council areas ==
Wards of the Carrick, Cumnock and Doon Valley Scottish Parliament constituency as of 2011.

The Carrick, Cumnock and Doon Valley constituency was created at the same time as the Scottish Parliament, in 1999, with the name and boundaries of an existing Westminster constituency. In 2005, however, Scottish Westminster (House of Commons) constituencies were mostly replaced with new constituencies.

The rest of East Ayrshire is covered by the Kilmarnock and Irvine Valley constituency, whilst the rest of South Ayrshire is covered by Ayr constituency.

Following their First Periodic review into constituencies to the Scottish Parliament in time for the 2011 Scottish Parliament election, the Boundary Commission for Scotland recommended redrawing the Carrick, Cumnock and Doon Valley constituency. The seat remained unchanged following the Second Periodic Review of Scottish Parliament Boundaries undertaken by Boundaries Scotland ahead of the 2026 Scottish Parliament election. The electoral wards of East Ayrshire Council and South Ayrshire Council used in the current creation of Carrick, Cumnock and Doon Valley are:

- East Ayrshire
  - Ballochmyle (shared with Kilmarnock and Irvine Valley)
  - Cumnock and New Cumnock (entire ward)
  - Doon Valley (entire ward)
- South Ayrshire
  - Kyle (entire ward)
  - Maybole, North Carrick and Coylton (entire ward)
  - Girvan and South Carrick (entire ward)

== Constituency profile and voting patterns ==
=== Constituency profile ===
The rural constituency of Carrick, Cumnock and Doon Valley is a diverse and sparsely populated area made up of former mining communities, outlying suburban villages, fertile farmlands and coastal resorts. Carrick stretches along the rugged and idyllic Ayrshire coast between Ayr and Galloway, taking in Culzean Castle and the resorts of Turnberry, home to the renowned Turnberry hotel and golf course, and Maidens. The main population centres within Carrick are Girvan, which serves as the area's main harbour and the main town of the Carrick area, and Maybole, the historic capital of the kingdom of Carrick. To the north west of the constituency, are the former mining villages of Tarbolton, Annbank and Mossblown. The more affluent suburban villages of Dundonald, Loans, Coylton and Symington serve as commuter villages to Ayr, Prestwick and Troon. Cumnock, Doon Valley and Ballochmyle in the East Ayrshire section of the constituency housed the central headquarters of coal mining operations in the Ayrshire area prior to the industry's collapse in the 1980s. The area is predominantly composed of dispersed and deprived former mining communities such as Cumnock, New Cunmock, Dalmellington, Bellsbank and Patna. The Trade Union movement was particularly strong in the area during the 1980s and 1990s. Keir Hardie, who is regarded as one of the primary founders of the Labour Party, was active in organising a local trade union for miners in the area during the late 1800s,

=== Voting patterns ===
At Westminster, the equivalent South Ayrshire and later Carrick, Cumnock and Doon Valley constituencies consistently returned Labour MP's since the 1930s. The area was among the most reliable and safest Labour areas in Scotland and the UK as a whole, with Labour continually gaining the majority of the vote in most electoral wards in the constituency. On a local level, Cumnock, Ballochmyle, Doon Valley, Maybole, Annbank, Tarbolton, Mossblown and parts of Girvan consistently supported Labour, with these areas making up the majority of the constituency. Rural and suburban areas in Kyle and Carrick have been more supportive of Conservative candidates in the past - including Coylton, Dundoald, Loans, Monkton, Symington, Dunure, Minishant and Girvan Ailsa at the 2003 local election for South Ayrshire. At the 1979 UK general election the Scottish Labour Party - a pro-independence breakaway group from the UK Labour Party - polled second place in the constituency at just 1,521 votes behind Labour's George Foulkes.

Although the SNP have traditionally performed poorly in Carrick, Cumnock and Doon Valley they were able to secure the Scottish Parliamentary constituency in 2011 with a majority of 2,581 votes. In 2016 Labour's support in the constituency slumped, with the Conservatives increasing their vote share by 9.7% to take 24.2% of the vote, narrowly behind Labour's 27.4%, allowing Jeane Freeman of the SNP to increase Adam Ingram's initial majority of 2,581 in 2011 to 6,006 in 2016 despite seeing little change in the SNP's vote share in the constituency, however the SNP have performed very well in recent elections

At the 2017 council elections, the Conservatives formed the largest party across the South Ayrshire section of the constituency through Kyle and Carrick, with the Labour Party remaining the largest party in Cumnock and Doon Valley in East Ayrshire. Conservative Bill Grant went on to gain the overlapping UK Parliament constituency of Ayr, Carrick and Cumnock with a 6% majority at the 2017 UK general election. The SNP regained this seat at the 2019 UK general election.

In 2021, the area returned the third largest swing towards the Conservatives in Scotland, who overtook Labour into second place in the constituency. The SNP's majority in the constituency was reduced from 6,006 to 4,337 votes.

== Member of the Scottish Parliament ==
Election	Member	Party
1999	Cathy Jamieson	Labour
2011	Adam Ingram	SNP
2016	Jeane Freeman	SNP
2021	Elena Whitham	SNP
2026	Katie Hagmann	SNP

== Election results ==
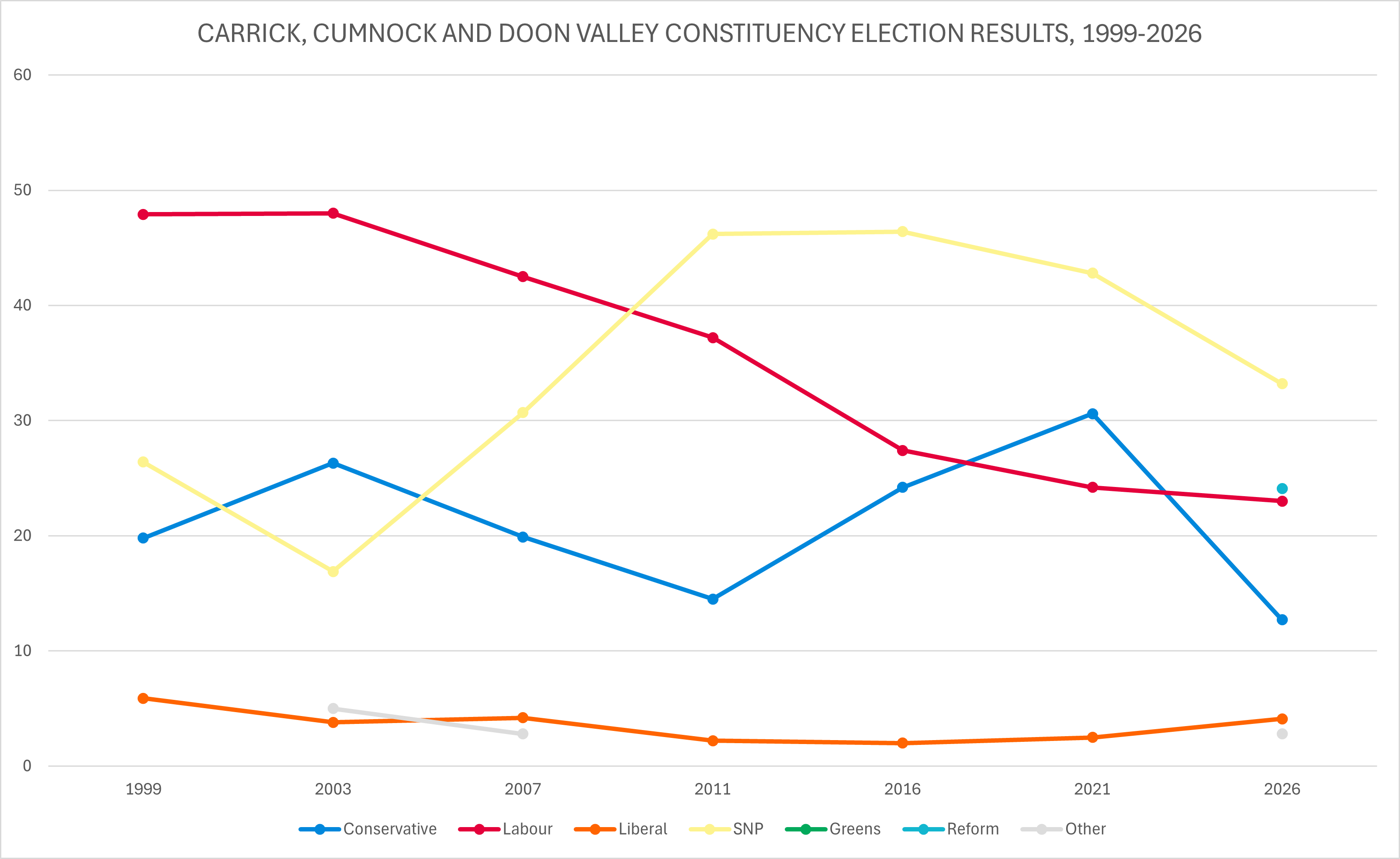
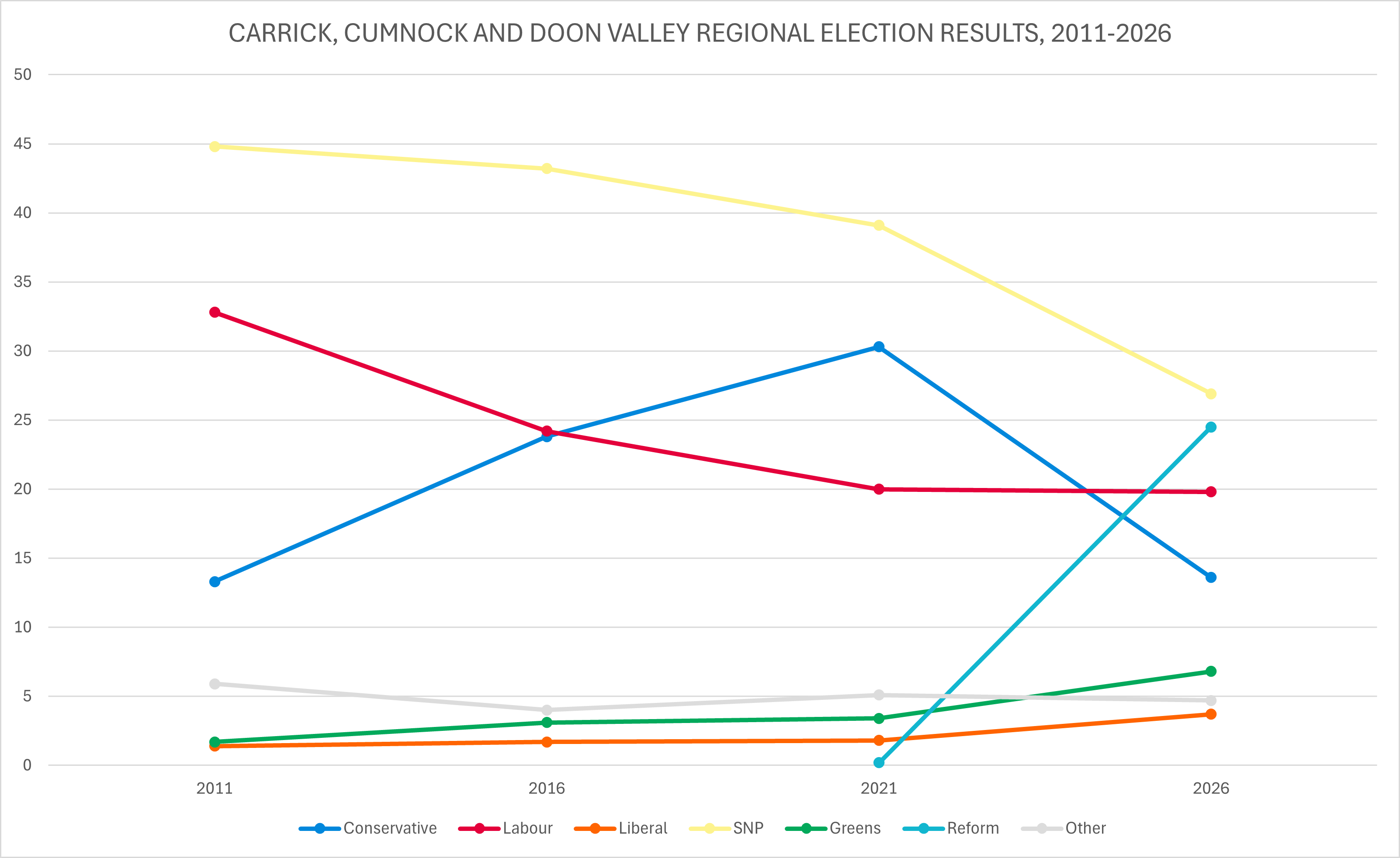

=== 2020s ===
2026 Scottish Parliament election: Carrick, Cumnock and Doon Valley
Party	Candidate	Constituency			Regional		
Party	Candidate	Votes	%	±%	Votes	%	±%
SNP	Katie Hagmann	9,610	33.2	▼9.6	7,816	26.9	▼12.2
Reform	Andrew Scott	6,988	24.1	New	7,140	24.5	New
Labour	Carol Mochan (Note: Incumbent member on the party list, or for another constituency)	6,671	23.0	▼1.2	5,759	19.8	▼0.2
Conservative	Tracey Clark	3,680	12.7	▼17.9	3,964	13.6	▼16.7
Green					1,964	6.8	▲3.4
Liberal Democrats	Jack Clark	1,187	4.1	▲1.6	1,086	3.7	▲1.9
Independent	Alison Hewett	413	1.4	New			
Independent	Sean Davis	412	1.4	New	211	0.7	New
AtLS					260	0.9	New
Independent Green Voice					227	0.8	▲0.4
Scottish Family					218	0.8	▲0.2
Independent	Denise Sommerville				121	0.4	New
UKIP					81	0.3	▲0.1
Scottish Socialist					73	0.3	New
Heritage					57	0.2	New
ADF					40	0.1	New
Scottish Libertarian					25	0.1	▼0.1
Scottish Common Party					21	0.1	New
Majority		2,622	9.1	▼3.1			
Valid votes		28,961			29,063		
Invalid votes		63			49		
Turnout		29,024	48.9	▼10.7	29,112	49.0	▼10.7
SNP hold		Swing					
Notes

2021 Scottish Parliament election: Carrick, Cumnock and Doon Valley
Party	Candidate	Constituency			Regional		
Party	Candidate	Votes	%	±%	Votes	%	±%
SNP	Elena Whitham	15,240	42.8	▼3.6	13,949	39.1	▼4.1
Conservative	Sharon Dowey (Note: Elected on the party list)	10,903	30.6	▲6.4	10,812	30.3	▲6.5
Labour	Carol Mochan	8,604	24.2	▼3.2	7,159	20.0	▼4.2
Green					1,200	3.4	▲0.3
All for Unity					674	1.9	New
Liberal Democrats	Kirsten Herbst-Grey	875	2.5	▲0.5	646	1.8	▲0.1
Alba					424	1.2	New
Scottish Family					201	0.6	New
Independent Green Voice					158	0.4	N/A
Abolish the Scottish Parliament					133	0.4	N/A
Freedom Alliance (UK)					82	0.2	New
Reform					73	0.2	New
UKIP					70	0.2	▼2.3
Scottish Libertarian					63	0.2	New
Scotia Future					15	0.0	New
Vanguard Party (UK)					8	0.0	New
Majority		4,337	12.2	▼6.8			
Valid votes		35,622			35,667		
Invalid votes		112			78		
Turnout		35,734	59.6	▲5.3	35,745	59.7	▲5.3
SNP hold		Swing					

=== 2010s ===
2016 Scottish Parliament election: Carrick, Cumnock and Doon Valley
Party	Candidate	Constituency			Regional		
Party	Candidate	Votes	%	±%	Votes	%	±%
SNP	Jeane Freeman	14,690	46.4	▲0.2	13,734	43.2	▼1.6
Labour	Carol Mochan	8,684	27.4	▼9.8	7,701	24.2	▼8.6
Conservative	Lee Lyons	7,666	24.2	▲9.7	7,561	23.8	▲10.5
Green					982	3.1	▲1.4
UKIP					799	2.5	▲1.8
Liberal Democrats	Dawud Islam	640	2.0	▼0.2	549	1.7	▲0.3
Solidarity					207	0.7	▲0.6
Clydesdale and South Scotland Independent					142	0.4	New
RISE					112	0.4	New
Majority		6,006	19.0	▲10.0			
Valid votes		31,680			31,787		
Invalid votes		115			44		
Turnout		31,795	54.3	▲5.8	31,831	54.4	▲5.8
SNP hold		Swing					
Notes

2011 Scottish Parliament election: Carrick, Cumnock and Doon Valley
Party	Candidate	Constituency			Regional		
Party	Candidate	Votes	%	±%	Votes	%	±%
SNP	Adam Ingram (Note: Incumbent member on the party list, or for another constituency)	13,250	46.2	N/A	12,893	44.8	N/A
Labour	Richard Leonard	10,669	37.2	N/A	9,425	32.8	N/A
Conservative	Peter Kennerley	4,160	14.5	N/A	3,834	13.3	N/A
Green					482	1.7	N/A
All-Scotland Pensioners Party					420	1.5	N/A
Liberal Democrats	Andrew Chamberlain	624	2.2	N/A	403	1.4	N/A
Socialist Labour					535	1.9	N/A
BNP					252	0.9	N/A
UKIP					215	0.7	N/A
Scottish Christian					178	0.6	N/A
Scottish Socialist					70	0.2	N/A
Solidarity					42	0.1	N/A
Majority		2,581	9.0	N/A			
Valid votes		28,703			28,749		
Invalid votes		111			88		
Turnout		28,814	48.5	N/A	28,837	48.6	N/A
SNP win (new boundaries)							

=== 2000s ===
2007 Scottish Parliament election: Carrick, Cumnock and Doon Valley
Party	Candidate	Votes	%	±%
Labour	Cathy Jamieson	14,350	42.5	−5.5
SNP	Adam Ingram	10,364	30.7	+13.8
Conservative	Tony Lewis	6,729	19.9	−6.4
Liberal Democrats	Paul McGreal	1,409	4.2	+0.4
Independent	Hugh Hill	809	2.4	New
Equal Parenting Alliance	Ray Barry	124	0.4	New
Majority		3,986	11.8	−9.9
Turnout		33,785	51.8	−1.0
Labour hold		Swing		

2003 Scottish Parliament election: Carrick, Cumnock and Doon Valley
Party	Candidate	Votes	%	±%
Labour	Cathy Jamieson	16,484	48.0	+0.1
Conservative	Phil Gallie	9,030	26.3	+6.5
SNP	Adam Ingram	5,822	16.9	−9.5
Scottish Socialist	Murray Steele	1,715	5.0	New
Liberal Democrats	Caron Howden	1,315	3.8	−2.1
Majority		7,454	21.7	+0.2
Turnout		34,366	52.8	−9.0
Labour hold		Swing		

=== 1990s ===
1999 Scottish Parliament election: Carrick, Cumnock and Doon Valley
Party	Candidate	Votes	%	±%
Labour	Cathy Jamieson	19,667	47.9	N/A
SNP	Adam Ingram	10,864	26.4	N/A
Conservative	John Scott	8,123	19.8	N/A
Liberal Democrats	David Hannay	2,441	5.9	N/A
Majority		8,803	21.5	N/A
Turnout		41,095	61.8	N/A
Labour win (new seat)				

== See also ==
- Carrick, Cumnock and Doon Valley (UK Parliament constituency)
