= Carrick Academy =

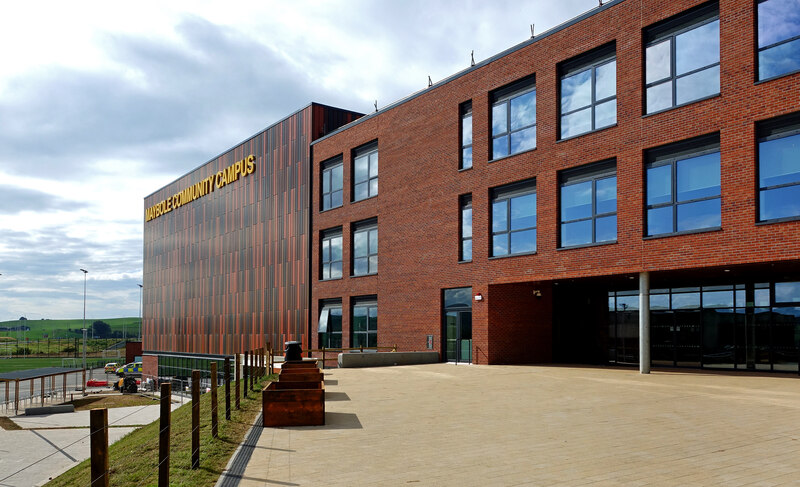
- School badge Carrick Academy within Maybole Community Campus

Location
- Kirkoswald Road; Maybole, South Ayrshire, KA19 8BP; Scotland; 55.3509°N 4.6941°W

Information
- Type: State school
- Motto: Superbe Gerimus (We bear it proudly)
- Established: 1845; 181 years ago
- Local authority: South Ayrshire
- Head Teacher: Elaine McEwan
- Staff: 86 (Aug. 2007); FTE 48.2 (Sept. 2006)
- Gender: Mixed
- Age: 11 to 18
- Enrolment: 390 (2021/22) 462 (2017/18)
- Houses: Culzean; Crossraguel; Cargill
- Colours: Blue, gold and black
- Feeder schools: Gardenrose Primary School, Cairn Primary School, Crosshill Primary School, Fisherton Primary School, Kirkmichael Primary School, Maidens Primary School, Minishant Primary School, Straiton Primary School, Dalrymple Primary School
- Website: https://carrickacademysayr.weebly.com/

Carrick Academy (Scottish Gaelic: Acadamaidh Charraig) is an 11–18 state-run secondary school, administered by South Ayrshire Council and situated in the Maybole Community Campus in the town of Maybole, South Ayrshire. Carrick Academy is the smallest of South Ayrshire's secondary schools based on pupil numbers, with a total of 391 pupils enrolled at the school in 2023–2024.

It has capacity to accommodate roughly 550 pupils from the town of Maybole and the villages of Dalrymple, Crosshill, Kirkmichael, Straiton, Minishant, Dunure, Dailly, Kirkoswald, Maidens, and surrounding farms. Carrick Academy was last inspected by Education Scotland in March 2015.

== History ==
=== Founding, 1845 ===
As both a primary and a secondary school, the school that was later to become Carrick Academy was founded in 1845. The three schools in Maybole (including the original parish school first mentioned in 1630) united under the name of Maybole Public School, which was then changed in 1891 to Maybole Ladyland School.

The school then assumed the title of Maybole Carrick Academy in 1905. The new academy moved to its current site in 1926 with the opening of the present Old Building. The New Building was added in 1974, which was destroyed along with the Old Building throughout the tail end of 2023 and the beginning of 2024. In 2023, the Maybole Community Campus opened on the same ground as the old school, consisting of a swimming pool/leisure centre; St Cuthbert's Primary School (denominational); the new Culzean Primary School, which merged the former Gardenrose and Cairn Primary Schools, both previously in Maybole; and Carrick Academy.

=== Heraldry ===
The school badge originates from the red chevron in a silver field which is the coat of arms of Carrick. The blue lions with red claws and red tongue came from the coat of arms worn by the Bruce family. When Robert the Bruce, the Earl of Carrick, became King of Scots his title moved into the Scottish royal family and subsequently into the present royal family. Prince William is the current Earl of Carrick. Maybole is the ancient capital of Carrick which is the most southerly of the three historical divisions of Ayrshire.

The Kennedys of Cassillis, the principal land owners of Carrick and known as the "Kings of Carrick", were in the main responsible for providing a school building and the schoolmaster's salary. In the badge, the black in the quills is taken from the black cross-crosslets in this family's coat of arms.

The book is the normal symbol used to indicate a school badge. The motto Superbe Gerimus was supplied by the Latin Department and means "We bear it proudly". The colours, blue and gold, were chosen because of their association with the Kennedy family. For distinguished service at Beugé in 1421, a member of the Kennedy family was given the right to use the blue and gold colours of the royal family of France.

=== School Building ===
The former Carrick Academy school campus had two main buildings. The old building which was situated at the front of the school was opened in 1926. All classrooms were fitted with interactive white boards and multi-media projectors. The Mathematics, English, Social Subjects including RME, Art and Design and Pastoral Care departments were located in the Old Building.

Additionally, there was a Nail Bar as well as a Technical room. The building contained a well-resourced library, an Assembly Hall and a Wi-Fi room which enhanced the ICT provision available to young people attending Carrick Academy. The new building at the back of the school was opened in 1974. It contained the departments of Computing, Design & Technology, Science, Business Studies, Modern Languages, Music and Home Economics. The new building also contained the school administration offices, the main staffroom, the school Dining Hall and Cafeteria. The office reception area and the canteen have Carrick TV displayed so that all pupils, staff and visitors to the school could keep up-to-date with all the events taking place. The PE facilities at Carrick Academy included a games hall, gym and a multi-use astro-turf.

The former Carrick Academy building closed to pupils and staff in August 2023 following the completion of the new Carrick Academy situated within the new build Maybole Community Campus which opened to Carrick Academy pupils and staff on 28 August 2023.

=== Maybole Community Campus ===
A new Maybole Community Campus, which incorporates Carrick Academy, St Cuthbert's Primary School, and the new Culzean Primary School and Early Years Centre (formed from the amalgamation of Gardenrose and Cairn Primary schools), opened in August 2023, creating an "inspiring learning environment" for up to 1,370 pupils. The project cost approximately £60 million and features new outdoor sports facilities, changing pavilion and a new indoor swimming pool which will be available for public use, and a replacement for Maybole Police Station.

The opening of the new Maybole Community Campus was delayed. Described as a "shambles" by the public, the building was delayed to allow contractors to put the finishing touches to the building. The new campus opened to primary and secondary staff and pupils on 28 August 2023. with Culzean Primary Early Years Centre pupils attending the campus a week later on 4 September 2023. Early years provision operated from the former Cairn and Gardenrose Primary School buildings during that time.

The Campus was built by Morgan Sindall Construction for hub South West Scotland, development partner of South Ayrshire Council. The new campus swimming pool is expected to open for pupil and public use in January 2024.

== School overview ==
=== School motto ===
The school's motto is Superbe Gerimus which is Latin for "We bear it proudly". The school coat of arms is a red chevron, indicating Carrick, on a silver background, with three azure lions, representing Maybole, and a gold book and quills, illustrating the school.

=== School houses structure ===
The school houses are Culzean House (blue), Crossraguel House (red), and Cargill House (yellow) and also previously included Cassilis (green).

=== Head Teachers ===
- Mr White – 1956–1970 – Retired*
- Mr Bell – 1970–1982 – Retired*
- Mr S Jardine – 1982–1990 – Left*
- Mr M Goodwin – 1990–1997 – Left*
- Mr R Stewart – 1997–2010 – Retired Early* Former DHT-1991-1997
- Mr K Webster – 2010–2013 – Left for Falkirk High School
- Mrs T S Stevens – 2013–2021 – Retired* notable for being the First Female Head Teacher
- Mrs E McEwan – 2021 to Present, former Depute Headteacher at near-by Girvan Academy.

== Notable former pupils ==
- Robert MacBryde (1913–1966), painter and theatre designer.
- Ross McCrorie (1998), professional football player.
- Robby McCrorie (1998), professional football player.
- Allan Dorans (1955) Scottish National Party politician
