= Allan Dorans =

Scottish National Party politician (born 1955)

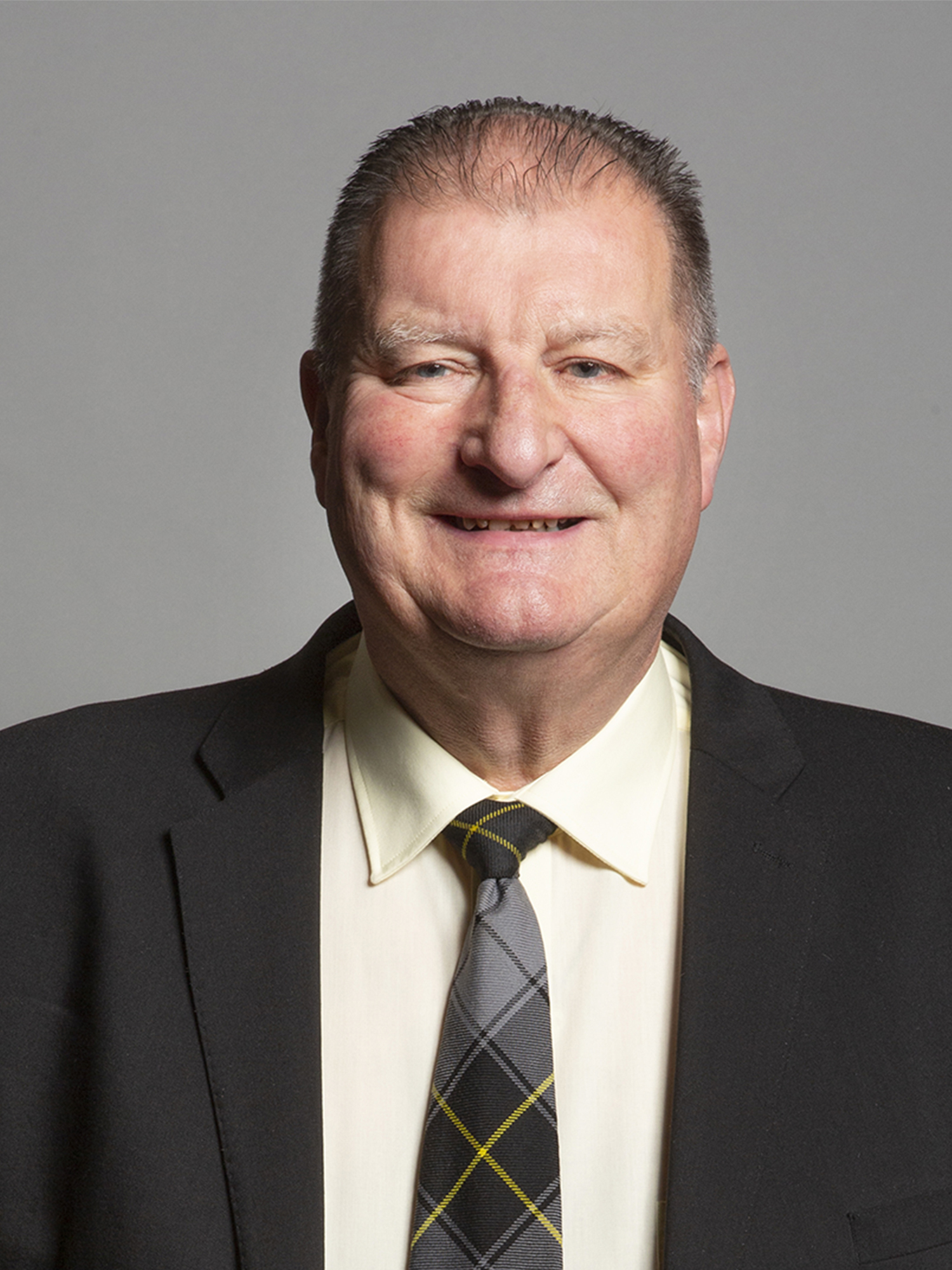
- Official portrait, 2019

Member of Parliament for Ayr, Carrick and Cumnock
- In office 12 December 2019 – 30 May 2024
- Preceded by: Bill Grant
- Succeeded by: Elaine Stewart

Personal details
- Born: Allan Hopkins Dorans; 30 July 1955 (age 70) Dailly, Scotland
- Party: Scottish National Party

Allan Hopkins Dorans (born 30 July 1955) is a Scottish National Party (SNP) politician who served as the Member of Parliament (MP) for Ayr, Carrick and Cumnock from 2019 until his eventual electoral defeat at the 2024 general election.

Dorans was made a Companion of the Institute of Personnel and Development (CIPD) in 1990 and a member of the Chartered Management Institute (MCMI) in 2000.

== Early life and career ==
Allan Dorans was born on 30 July 1955 in Dailly, South Ayrshire, the son of Peter Dorans DCM and Agnes Dorans, the youngest of nine children. He was educated at Carrick Academy in Maybole, before studying at the Open University and at the University of the West of Scotland, gaining a diploma in public service leadership.

After university, Dorans joined the Metropolitan Police and reached the rank of detective inspector by the age of 28, serving with the force from 1972 to 1987. During that time he was a uniform response officer as a constable, sergeant and inspector. He also served as a detective in the rank of constable, sergeant and inspector, specialising in the investigation of the most serious crimes of rape, robbery and murder. He completed his career in the Metropolitan Police as an instructor at the Detective Training School at Hendon.

From 2002 to 2003, he was a substitute teacher at Cape Elizabeth High School in Maine, United States. Dorans was an area manager for the West of Scotland with SACRO, a leading Scottish community safety charity from 2003 to 2009. He was also managing director of West of Scotland Mediation Services from 2009 to 2013.

Dorans was first elected to South Ayrshire Council in 2012 for the SNP in Ayr West ward, then appointed in 2014 as SNP Group Leader. He was defeated in 2017.

== Parliamentary career ==
At the 2019 general election, Dorans was elected to Parliament as MP for Ayr, Carrick and Cumnock with 43.5% of the vote and a majority of 2,329.

He was appointed as the Shadow SNP Spokesperson for Policing on 10 February 2021. He was a member of the Standards Committee, Privileges Committee and the European Scrutiny Committee.

Dorans is a leading campaigner for "Justice for Yvonne", which is a campaign led by his former police colleague, John Murray, to bring to justice those responsible for the murder of WPC Yvonne Fletcher, who was shot in the back and murdered outside the Libyan Peoples Bureau on 17 April 1984. Dorans raised the issue at Prime Minister's Questions in July 2020. On 22 February 2022 Dorans secured and led an adjournment debate on that subject in the House of Commons. On 7 December 2022 he again raised the subject of the murder of WPC Fletcher at Prime Ministers Questions with the recently elected Prime Minister, Rishi Sunak, who has agreed to meet with him to see how this matter may be taken forward.

At the 2024 general election, Dorans lost his seat to the Labour candidate Elaine Stewart.

He has been selected to be a candidate in the 2026 Scottish Parliament election.

== Personal life ==
In 1979, he married Maureen Beeson; the couple have a son and two grandsons. He lists his recreations as trekking and "undertaking challenging events to raise funds for charitable causes".

Parliament of the United Kingdom
Preceded by Bill Grant	Member of Parliament for Ayr, Carrick and Cumnock; 2019–2024	Succeeded by Elaine Stewart
