= Maybole, North Carrick and Coylton (ward) =

Electoral ward in South Ayrshire, Scotland

- South Ayrshire
- Boundary of Maybole, North Carrick and Coylton in South Ayrshire from 2017.
- Population: 12,394 (2021)
- Electorate: 9,316 (2022)
- Major settlements: Maybole; Coylton
- Scottish Parliament constituency: Carrick, Cumnock and Doon Valley
- Scottish Parliament region: South Scotland
- UK Parliament constituency: Ayr, Carrick and Cumnock; Central Ayrshire

Current ward
- Created: 2007
- Number of councillors: 3
- Councillor: William Grant (SNP)
- Councillor: Ian Campbell (Conservative)
- Councillor: Brian Connolly (Independent)
- Created from: Annbank Mossblown St Quivox; Coylton and Minishant; North Carrick and Maybole West; North Carrick and Maybole East; South Carrick

Maybole, North Carrick and Coylton is one of the eight electoral wards of South Ayrshire Council. Originally a four-member ward, Maybole, North Carrick and Coylton was reduced in size following a boundary review and has elected three councillors since the 2017 South Ayrshire Council election.

The ward has been split politically between the Scottish National Party (SNP) and the Conservatives with each party taking one seat at every election.

== Boundaries ==
The ward was created following the Fourth Statutory Reviews of Electoral Arrangements ahead of the 2007 Scottish local elections. As a result of the Local Governance (Scotland) Act 2004, local elections in Scotland would use the single transferable vote electoral system from 2007 onwards so Maybole, North Carrick and Coylton was formed from an amalgamation of several previous first-past-the-post wards.

It contained all of the former North Carrick and Maybole East ward as well as the majority of the former Coylton and Minishant and North Carrick and Maybole West wards, the northern half of the former Annbank Mossblown St Quivox ward and part of the former South South Carrick wards. The ward runs across the centre of the council area from the Firth of Clyde coast to the council's boundary with East Ayrshire and includes the towns of Maybole and Coylton. Following the Fifth Statutory Reviews of Electoral Arrangements ahead of the 2017 Scottish local elections, the ward's northern boundary was moved north and an area around Maidens, Turnberry and Kirkoswald was transferred to the Girvan and South Carrick ward. As a result, the ward was reduced from a four-member ward to a three-member ward.

== Councillors ==
Election	Councillors			
2007	Mairi Low (SNP)	Brian Connolly (Independent)	Ann Galbreith (Conservative)	Sandra Goldie (Labour)
2012	William Grant (SNP)	Brian Connolly (Independent)	Ann Galbreith (Conservative)	Sandra Goldie (Labour)
2017	William Grant (SNP)	Brian Connolly (Independent)	Ian Campbell (Conservative)	
2022	William Grant (SNP)	Brian Connolly (Independent)	Ian Campbell (Conservative)	

== Election results ==
=== 2022 election ===
Maybole, North Carrick and Coylton - 3 seats
Party	Candidate	FPv%	Count					
Party	Candidate	FPv%	1	2	3	4	5	6
SNP	William James Grant (incumbent)	31.9	1,370					
Conservative	Ian Campbell (incumbent)	20.9	895	903	914	1,435		
Independent	Brian Connolly (incumbent)	17.6	756	857	892	920	1,043	1,402
Conservative	Laura McEwan	14.5	623	629	635			
Labour	Nicola Saxton	12.4	532	598	651	690	752	
Liberal Democrats	Stephen Ralph	2.4	106	130				
Electorate: 9,316 Valid: 4,282 Spoilt: 74 Quota: 1,071 Turnout: 46.8%

=== 2017 election ===
Maybole, North Carrick and Coylton - 3 seats
Party	Candidate	FPv%	Count	
Party	Candidate	FPv%	1	2
Conservative	Ian Campbell	36.4	1,584	
SNP	William Grant (incumbent)	27.7	1,202	
Independent	Brian Connolly (incumbent)	20.8	904	1,089
Labour	Catriona Deliveli	9.4	408	478
Independent	Gordon McFadzean	5.7	249	318
Electorate: 9,359 Valid: 4,347 Spoilt: 45 Quota: 1,087 Turnout: 48.1%

=== 2012 election ===
Maybole, North Carrick and Coylton - 4 seats
Party	Candidate	FPv%	Count	
Party	Candidate	FPv%	1	2
Independent	Brian Connolly (incumbent)	25.5	1,100	
Labour	Sandra Goldie (incumbent)	22.9	986	
Conservative	Ann Galbraith (incumbent)	21.3	916	
SNP	William James Grant	18.8	810	894
SNP	Mairi Low (incumbent)	11.4	493	527
Electorate: 8,918 Valid: 4,305 Spoilt: 57 Quota: 862 Turnout: 38.8%

=== 2007 election ===
Maybole, North Carrick and Coylton – 4 seats
Party	Candidate	FPv%	Count						
Party	Candidate	FPv%	1	2	3	4	5	6	7
SNP	Mairi Low	24.7	1,411						
Independent	Brian Connolly	24.7	1,410						
Conservative	Ann Galbreith	19.5	1,111	1,138	1,184				
Labour	Sandra Goldie	17.0	970	1,009	1,036	1,037	1,066	???	???
Labour	Peter Mason	9.2	526	552	584	585	613	???	
Conservative	David Steele	4.9	281	297	304	321	349		
Independent	Helen Whitefield	1.8	102	148	213	214			
Valid: 5,811 Quota: 1,163
