= Ayr West (ward) =

Electoral ward in South Ayrshire, Scotland

- South Ayrshire
- Boundary of Ayr West in South Ayrshire from 2017.
- Population: 16,793 (2021)
- Electorate: 14,541 (2022)
- Major settlements: Ayr (part of)
- Scottish Parliament constituency: Ayr
- Scottish Parliament region: South Scotland
- UK Parliament constituency: Ayr, Carrick and Cumnock

Current ward
- Created: 2007
- Number of councillors: 4
- Councillor: Martin Dowey (Conservative)
- Councillor: Bob Shields (Independent)
- Councillor: George Weir (SNP)
- Councillor: Lee Lyons (Conservative)
- Created from: Ayr Central; Ayr Craigie; Ayr Doonfoot and Seafield; Ayr Fort; Ayr Old Belmont; Ayr Rozelle; Coylton and Minishant; North Carrick and Maybole West

Ayr West is one of the eight electoral wards of South Ayrshire Council. Created in 2007, the ward elects four councillors using the single transferable vote electoral system and covers an area with a population of 16,793 people.

The area is a stronghold for the Conservatives who have won at least half the seats at every election and held three of the ward's four seats between 2017 and 2022.

== Boundaries ==
The ward was created following the Fourth Statutory Reviews of Electoral Arrangements ahead of the 2007 Scottish local elections. As a result of the Local Governance (Scotland) Act 2004, local elections in Scotland would use the single transferable vote electoral system from 2007 onwards so Ayr West was formed from an amalgamation of several previous first-past-the-post wards.

It contained all of the former Ayr Doonfoot and Seafield, Ayr Fort and Ayr Rozelle wards as well as parts of the former Ayr Old Belmont ward, a small area from the former Ayr Craigie ward, an area in the west of the former Coylton and Minishant ward, the northern part of the former North Carrick and Maybole West and the southwestern part of the former Ayr Central ward. Despite its name, the ward centres on the southern portion of the town of Ayr which is situated on the Firth of Clyde coast in the northwest of the council area. It originally contained everything in the town south of the River Ayr, west of Carrick Road/Monument Road and south of the Rozelle Estate as well as an area north of the river around John Street. Following the Fifth Statutory Reviews of Electoral Arrangements ahead of the 2017 Scottish local elections, the ward's eastern boundary was amended west to run along the Glasgow South Western railway line.

== Councillors ==
Year	Councillors			
2007	Bill Grant (Conservative)	Mike Peddie (SNP)	Elaine Little (Labour/ Independent/ SNP)	Robin Reid (Conservative)
2008	Bill Grant (Conservative)	Mike Peddie (SNP)	Elaine Little (Labour/ Independent/ SNP)	Robin Reid (Conservative)
February 2012	Bill Grant (Conservative)	Mike Peddie (SNP)	Elaine Little (Labour/ Independent/ SNP)	Robin Reid (Conservative)
2012	Bill Grant (Conservative)	Allan Dorans (SNP)	Kirsty Darwent (Labour)	Robin Reid (Conservative)
2017	Martin Dowey (Conservative)	Siobhian Brown (SNP)	Derek McCabe (Conservative)	Lee Lyons (Conservative)
2022	Martin Dowey (Conservative)	George Weir (SNP)	Bob Shields (Independent)	Lee Lyons (Conservative)

== Election results ==
=== 2022 election ===
Ayr West - 4 seats
Party	Candidate	FPv%	Count								
Party	Candidate	FPv%	1	2	3	4	5	6	7	8	9
Conservative	Martin Dowey (incumbent)	27.1	2,271								
Independent	Bob Shields	22.8	1,909								
SNP	George Weir	14.5	1,217	1,218	1,237	1,252	1,275	1,282	1,870		
Labour	John Duncan	10.9	915	930	961	981	1,117	1,140	1,165	1,247	
Conservative	Lee Lyons (incumbent)	8.3	699	1,113	1,164	1,199	1,235	1,646	1,649	1,652	1,893
SNP	Margaret Weir	7.3	614	614	624	628	653	655			
Conservative	Derek McCabe (incumbent)	4.0	341	465	503	515	548				
Liberal Democrats	Jamie Ross	3.5	295	305	341	349					
Scottish Family	Gordon Hawley Bryce	1.2	108	111	118						
Electorate: 14,541 Valid: 8,369 Spoilt: 133 Quota: 1,674 Turnout: 58.5%

=== 2017 election ===
Ayr West - 4 seats
Party	Candidate	FPv%	Count						
Party	Candidate	FPv%	1	2	3	4	5	6	7
Conservative	Martin Dowey	38.7	3,160						
SNP	Siobhian Brown	15.5	1,267	1,276	1,276	1,376	2,006		
Conservative	Lee Lyons	12.3	1,006	1,847					
Labour	Liz Martin	11.1	911	952	961	1,071	1,103	1,248	
Conservative	Derek McCabe	8.3	675	1,211	1,400	1,530	1,547	1,560	1,865
SNP	Allan Dorans (incumbent)	7.9	646	653	654	723			
Independent	Chic Brodie	6.2	506	530	535				
Electorate: 13,822 Valid: 8,171 Spoilt: 138 Quota: 1,635 Turnout: 59.4%

=== 2012 election ===
Ayr West - 4 seats
Party	Candidate	FPv%	Count						
Party	Candidate	FPv%	1	2	3	4	5	6	7
Conservative	Bill Grant (incumbent)	33.8	1,992						
Labour	Kirsty Darwent	15.3	901	929	939	976	1,007	1,049	1,267
Conservative	Robin Reid (incumbent)	14.4	846	1,456					
SNP	Allan Dorans	14.2	836	858	867	874	1,410		
SNP	Roddy MacDonald	10.8	638	660	673	688			
Independent	Brian McKinlay	9.3	549	607	671	734	781	846	
Liberal Democrats	Nicola Prigg	2.2	127	143	177				
Electorate: 12,401 Valid: 5,889 Spoilt: 57 Quota: 1,178 Turnout: 47.5%

=== 2007 election ===
Ayr West – 4 seats
Party	Candidate	FPv%	Count					
Party	Candidate	FPv%	1	2	3	4	5	6
Conservative	Bill Grant	30.3	2,176					
SNP	Mike Peddie	20.9	1,499					
Labour	Elaine Little	16.9	1,213	1,238	1,249	1,384	???	???
Conservative	Robin Reid	15.7	1,127	1,320	1,329	1,479		
Conservative	Alistair Kerr	8.8	634	1,084	1,088	1,168	???	
Independent	Ian McCabe	7.5	537	559	576			
Valid: 7,186 Quota: 1,438
