= Kyle (ward) =

Electoral ward in South Ayrshire, Scotland

- South Ayrshire
- Boundary of Kyle in South Ayrshire from 2017.
- Population: 14,546 (2021)
- Electorate: 10,625 (2022)
- Major settlements: Annbank; Mossblown; Tarbolton; Monkton
- Scottish Parliament constituency: Carrick, Cumnock and Doon Valley
- Scottish Parliament region: South Scotland
- UK Parliament constituency: Central Ayrshire

Current ward
- Created: 2007
- Number of councillors: 3
- Councillor: Julie Dettbarn (SNP)
- Councillor: Duncan Townson (Labour)
- Councillor: Stephen Ferry (Conservative)
- Created from: Annbank Mossblown St Quivox; Dundonald and Loans; Prestwick St Cuthbert's and Monkton; Tarbolton Symington Craigie

Kyle is one of the eight electoral wards of South Ayrshire Council. Created in 2007, the ward elects three councillors using the single transferable vote electoral system and covers an area with a population of 14,546 people.

The ward has been split politically between the Scottish National Party (SNP), Labour and the Conservatives with each party taking one seat at every election.

== Boundaries ==
The ward was created following the Fourth Statutory Reviews of Electoral Arrangements ahead of the 2007 Scottish local elections. As a result of the Local Governance (Scotland) Act 2004, local elections in Scotland would use the single transferable vote electoral system from 2007 onwards so Kyle was formed from an amalgamation of several previous first-past-the-post wards.

It contained all of the former Tarbolton Symington Craigie ward as well as the majority of the former Dundonald and Loans ward and the northern halves of the former Annbank Mossblown St Quivox and Prestwick St Cuthbert's and Monkton wards. Kyle takes its name from the former comital district which covered parts of what is now East Ayrshire and South Ayrshire. The ward includes the northeasternmost part of the council area between its borders with North Ayrshire and East Ayrshire and takes in the towns of Annbank, Mossblown, Tarbolton and Monkton. Following the Fifth Statutory Reviews of Electoral Arrangements ahead of the 2017 Scottish local elections, the ward's southern boundary was moved south but there were no further changes.

== Councillors ==
Year	Councillors		
2007	Andy Campbell (Labour)	John Allan (SNP)	Hywel Davies (Conservative/ Independent)
2012	Andy Campbell (Labour)	John Allan (SNP)	Hywel Davies (Conservative/ Independent)
2013	Andy Campbell (Labour)	John Allan (SNP)	Hywel Davies (Conservative/ Independent)
2017	Andy Campbell (Labour)	Julie Dettbarn (SNP)	Arthur Spurling (Conservative)
2022	Duncan Townson (Labour)	Julie Dettbarn (SNP)	Stephen Ferry (Conservative)

== Election results ==
=== 2022 election ===
Kyle - 3 seats
Party	Candidate	FPv%	Count					
Party	Candidate	FPv%	1	2	3	4	5	6
SNP	Julie Dettbarn (incumbent)	33.9	1,635					
Labour	Duncan Townson	23.0	1,110	1,236				
Conservative	Stephen Ferry	19.8	955	964	967	971	1,072	1,836
Conservative	Arthur Spurling (incumbent)	16.8	814	823	826	830	879	
Liberal Democrats	John Aitken	4.8	235	288	299	365		
Alba	Geoff Bush	1.4	71	154	156			
Electorate: 10,625 Valid: 4,820 Spoilt: 57 Quota: 1,206 Turnout: 45.9%

=== 2017 election ===
Kyle - 3 seats
Party	Candidate	FPv%	Count			
Party	Candidate	FPv%	1	2	3	4
Conservative	Arthur Spurling	43.8	2,160			
Labour	Andy Campbell (incumbent)	25.3	1,247			
SNP	Julie Dettbarn	16.4	807	876	879	1,612
SNP	Scott McFarlane	14.6	721	811	813	
Electorate: 10,215 Valid: 4,935 Spoilt: 74 Quota: 1,234 Turnout: 48.7%

=== 2012 election ===
Kyle - 3 seats
Party	Candidate	FPv%	Count	
Party	Candidate	FPv%	1	2
Labour	Andy Campbell (incumbent)	32.7	1,207	
SNP	John Allan (incumbent)	28.7	1,057	
Conservative	Hywel Davies (incumbent) (Note: Cllr Davies resigned from the Conservatives in May 2013 and became an independent.)	23.5	865	923
Independent	Arthur Spurling	15.1	556	647
Electorate: 8,918 Valid: 3,685 Spoilt: 43 Quota: 922 Turnout: 41.3%

=== 2007 election ===
Kyle – 3 seats
Party	Candidate	FPv%	Count				
Party	Candidate	FPv%	1	2	3	4	5
Labour	Andy Campbell	22.7	1,128	1,473			
SNP	John Allan	21.8	1,080	1,112	1,156	1,332	
Conservative	Hywel Davies	18.0	891	905	916	992	???
Conservative	Arthur Spurling	16.2	801	813	822	859	
Independent	Sam Gardiner	11.1	550	565	603		
Labour	Danny Howley	10.1	499				
Valid: 4,949 Quota: 1,238
