= Kyle, Ayrshire =

Historic district in Scotland

Coordinates: 55.5°N 4.3°W

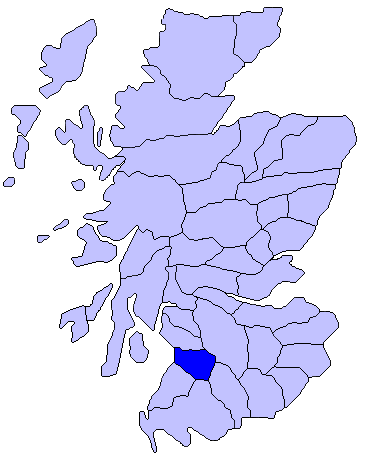
Map of Scotland showing the district of Kyle

Kyle as the central district of Ayrshire

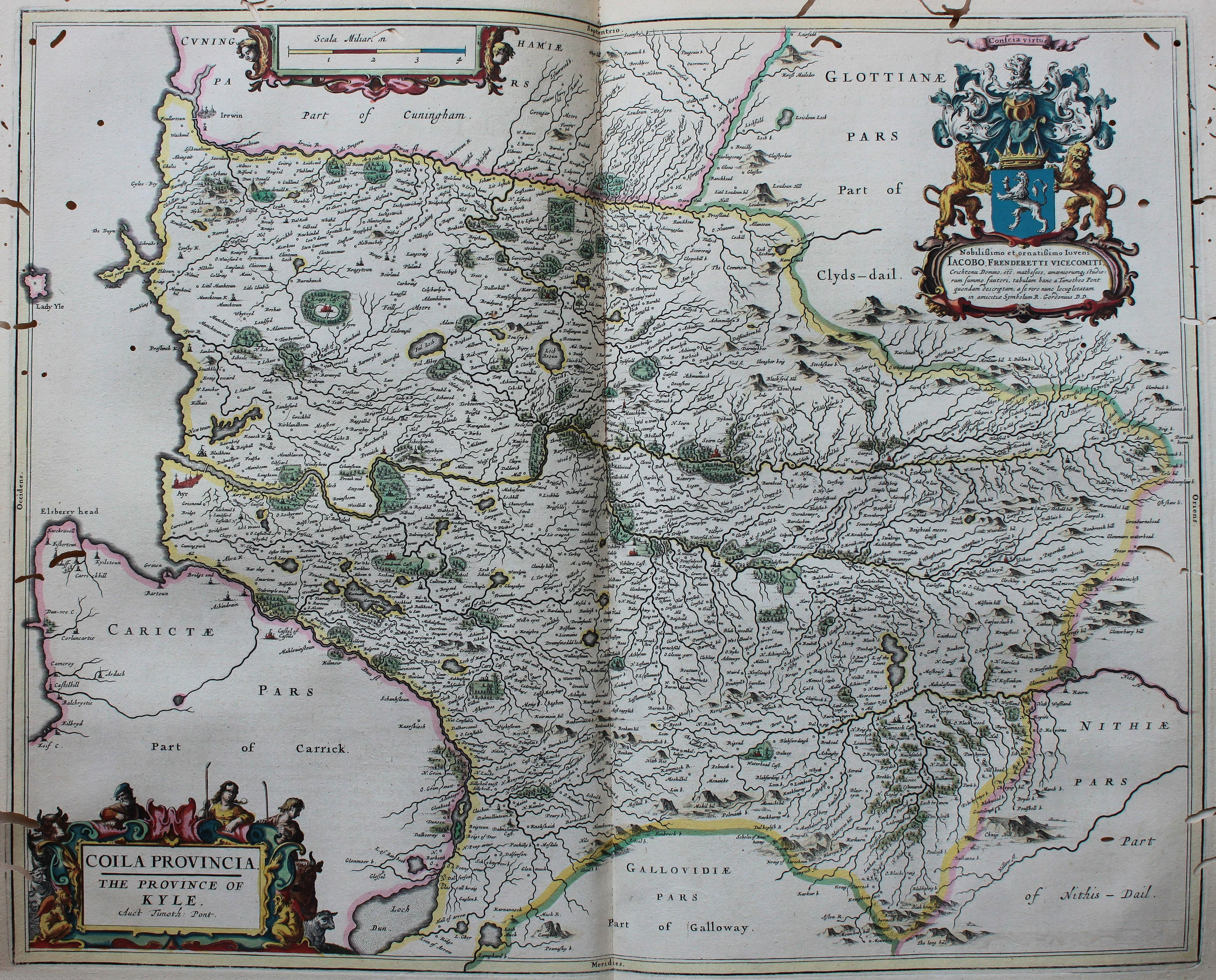
Old map of Kyle

Kyle (or Coila poetically; Scottish Gaelic: Cuil) is a former comital district of Scotland which stretched across parts of modern-day East Ayrshire and South Ayrshire. It is supposedly named after Coel Hen, a legendary king of the Britons, who is said to be buried under a mound at Coylton. The earliest reference is in the "Continuation of Bede" which states that in 750, "Eadberctus campum Cyil cum aliis regionibus suo regno addidit." Or "Eadberht of Northumbria added the plain of Kyle, along with other regions, to his kingdom." Prior to this, Kyle is presumed to have been part of Alt Clut.

== Geographical extent ==
The area is bordered by the historical districts of Cunninghame to the north, Clydesdale to the east and by Carrick to the south. The Firth of Clyde lies to the west.

Kyle was the central of the three districts in the sheriffdom of Ayr (Ayrshire), which was divided naturally by its three primary rivers all running in a generally westward direction to flow into the firth of Clyde. The River Irvine forms the northern boundary of Kyle with Cunninghame; the River Doon established its southern boundary with Carrick. Additionally, Kyle itself was sub-divided into two parts. To the north of the River Ayr was "Kyle Stewart" (sometimes called "Stewart Kyle" or "Walter's Kyle"), lands held by the FitzAlans (the future Stewart Kings of Scotland) since the 12th century. To the south was "Kyle Regis" or "King's Kyle", lands historically retained by the monarch under royal authority from the royal castle at Ayr.

Kyle was combined with Cunninghame and Carrick under Ayrshire County Council as a result of the Local Government (Scotland) Act 1889; this Act established a uniform system of county councils and town councils in Scotland and restructured many of Scotland's areas.

== Kyle and Carrick District ==
From 1975 to 1996 Kyle and Carrick was the name of a local government district in Strathclyde region, although the larger part of historic Kyle formed Cumnock and Doon Valley district. In 1996 Kyle and Carrick was constituted as a Unitary Authority, but renamed South Ayrshire.

== Council ward ==
In local government the area of Kyle makes up a council ward, bordering the council wards of Troon; Prestwick; Ayr North and Maybole, North Carrick & Coylton in the South Ayrshire Council area. It has three local councillors belonging to the Conservative Party, the Scottish National Party and the Labour Party. The area of Kyle includes the villages of Annbank, Mossblown, Tarbolton, Monkton, Symington and Dundonald as well as a number of smaller surrounding settlements such as Craigie, St Quivox and Loans. The area encompasses the northern portion of South Ayrshire excluding Troon, Prestwick and Ayr. It is bounded by the northern and eastern borders of the South Ayrshire Council area, which border North and East Ayrshire respectively. The southern border of the area follows the River Ayr between Ayr and the administrative border between South Ayrshire and East Ayrshire.

== Kyle Castle ==
At Dalblair near Cumnock, at the confluence of Guelt and Glenmuirshaw Waters, lie the ruins of the once impressive 15th century Kyle Castle.
