= 2022 South Ayrshire Council election =

South Ayrshire Council election

- 5 May 2022

All 28 seats to South Ayrshire Council 15 seats needed for a majority
- Registered: 92,112
- Turnout: 49.7%
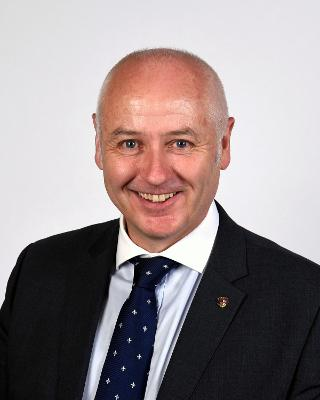

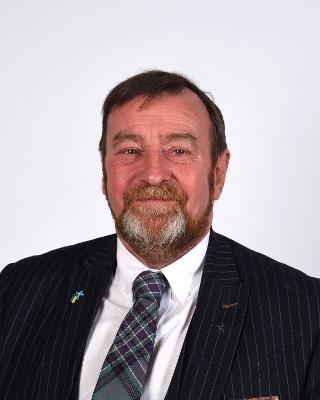

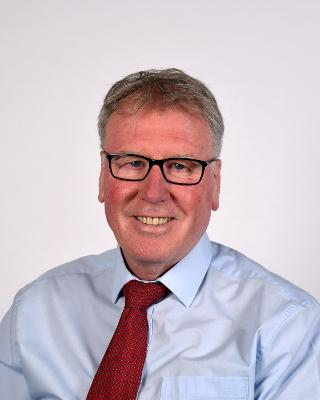
| | First party | Second party |
|---|---|---|
| Leader | Martin Dowey | Peter Henderson |
| Party | Conservative | SNP |
| Leader's seat | Ayr West | Girvan and South Carrick |
| Last election | 12 seats, 43.4% | 9 seats, 30.2% |
| Seats before | 11 | 9 |
| Seats won | 10 | 9 |
| Seat change | ▼2 | Steady |
| Popular vote | 14,520 | 14,838 |
| Percentage | 33.3% | 34.1% |
| Swing | ▼10.1% | ▲3.9% |
| | Third party | Fourth party |
| | | Ind |
| Leader | Brian McGinley | N/A |
| Party | Labour | Independent |
| Leader's seat | Ayr East | N/A |
| Last election | 5 seats, 15.2% | 2 seats, 10.7% |
| Seats before | 5 | 3 |
| Seats won | 5 | 4 |
| Seat change | Steady | ▲2 |
| Popular vote | 7,276 | 5,313 |
| Percentage | 16.7% | 12.2% |
| Swing | ▲1.5% | ▲1.5% |
Leader before election
Peter Henderson
(SNP)
No overall control
Leader after election
Martin Dowey
(Conservative)
No overall control

Elections to South Ayrshire Council took place on 5 May 2022 on the same day as the 31 other Scottish local government elections. As with other Scottish council elections, it was held using single transferable vote (STV) – a form of proportional representation – in which multiple candidates are elected in each ward and voters rank candidates in order of preference.

Despite shedding almost a quarter of their vote and coming second in the popular vote, the Conservatives retained their position as the largest party returning 10 councillors - two less than in the previous election. Both the Scottish National Party (SNP) – who topped the popular vote – and Labour made no gains or losses to remain as the second and third parties respectively. The number of independents returned increased from two to four.

Following the election the Conservatives formed a minority administration, replacing the previous SNP-Labour-Independent administration which was formed as a result of the previous election in 2017.

== Background ==
=== Previous election ===
At the previous election in 2017, the Conservatives won the most seats returning 12 councillors. The Scottish National Party (SNP) maintained their position as the second-largest party while boundary changes saw Labour lose out as they lost four seats to return five councillors. Two independents were also returned.

2017 South Ayrshire Council election result
| Party | Seats | Vote share |
|---|---|---|
| Conservatives | 12 | 43.4% |
| SNP | 9 | 30.2% |
| Labour | 5 | 15.2% |
| Independent | 2 | 10.7% |

=== Electoral system ===
The election used the eight wards created under the Local Governance (Scotland) Act 2004, with 28 councillors elected. Each ward elected either three or four members, using the single transferable vote (STV) electoral system – a form of proportional representation – where candidates are ranked in order of preference.

=== Composition ===
There was one change to the composition of the council following the previous election in 2017. Conservative councillor Hugh Hunter was de-selected in the run-up to the 2022 elections and resigned from the party to stand as an independent.

Composition of South Ayrshire Council
| Party | 2017 result | Dissolution |
|---|---|---|
| Conservative | 12 | 11 |
| SNP | 9 | 9 |
| Labour | 5 | 5 |
| Independents | 2 | 3 |

=== Retiring Councillors ===
Retiring councillors
| Council Ward | Party | Retiring Councillor |
|---|---|---|
| Troon | Conservative | Peter Convery |
| Prestwick | Conservative | Margaret Toner |
| Prestwick | Labour | Helen Moonie |
| Ayr North | SNP | Douglas Campbell |
| Ayr West | SNP | Siobhian Brown |
| Kyle | Labour | Andy Campbell |
| Girvan and South Carrick | Conservative | Ian Fitzsimmons |

=== Candidates ===
The total number of candidates increased from 45 in 2017 to 61 mainly due to the increased number of parties contesting the election. Unlike the previous vote, the Conservatives fielded the highest number of candidates at 19 – seven more than they had in 2017. Both the SNP and Labour also fielded at least one candidate in every ward but the 13 candidates fielded by the SNP and the eight fielded by Labour was one less than in 2017. The Liberal Democrats named six candidates in this election after fielding none in South Ayrshire in 2017. The number of independent candidates increased from nine in 2017 to 10 but the Greens did not contest the election as they did five years previous. Both the Scottish Family Party and the Alba Party fielded their first ever candidates in a South Ayrshire election.

== Results ==
2022 South Ayrshire Council election
| Party | Seats | Gains | Losses | Net gain/loss | Seats % | Votes % | Votes | +/− |
|---|---|---|---|---|---|---|---|---|
| Conservative | 10 | 0 | 2 | ▼2 | 35.7 | 32.6 | 14,520 | ▼10.1 |
| SNP | 9 | 0 | 0 | Steady | 32.1 | 33.4 | 14,849 | ▲3.9 |
| Labour | 5 | 0 | 0 | Steady | 17.8 | 16.3 | 7,276 | ▲1.5 |
| Independent | 4 | 2 | 0 | ▲2 | 14.2 | 15.3 | 6,820 | ▲1.5 |
| Liberal Democrats | 0 | 0 | 0 | Steady | 0.0 | 1.5 | 671 | New |
| Alba | 0 | 0 | 0 | Steady | 0.0 | 0.6 | 275 | New |
| Scottish Family | 0 | 0 | 0 | Steady | 0.0 | 0.2 | 108 | New |
| Total | 28 | | | | | | 43,488 | |

Note: Votes are the sum of first preference votes across all council wards. The net gain/loss and percentage changes relate to the result of the previous Scottish local elections on 4 May 2017. This is because STV has an element of proportionality which is not present unless multiple seats are being elected. This may differ from other published sources showing gain/loss relative to seats held at the dissolution of Scotland's councils.

=== Ward summary ===
Results of the 2022 South Ayrshire Council election by ward
| Ward | % | Cllrs | % | Cllrs | % | Cllrs | % | Cllrs | % | Cllrs | Total Cllrs |
| Ward | Con | | SNP | | Lab | | Ind | | Others | | Total Cllrs |
|---|---|---|---|---|---|---|---|---|---|---|---|
| Troon | 37.3 | 2 | 35.9 | 1 | 19.2 | 1 | 2.8 | 0 | 4.7 | 0 | 4 |
| Prestwick | 25.5 | 1 | 34.8 | 1 | 15.4 | 1 | 23.2 | 1 | 1.2 | 0 | 4 |
| Ayr North | 20.5 | 1 | 45.9 | 2 | 24.1 | 1 | 6.3 | 0 | 3.2 | 0 | 4 |
| Ayr East | 30.0 | 1 | 39.2 | 1 | 16.5 | 1 | 12.1 | 0 | 2.3 | 0 | 3 |
| Ayr West | 39.6 | 2 | 21.9 | 1 | 10.9 | 0 | 22.8 | 1 | 4.8 | 0 | 4 |
| Kyle | 36.7 | 1 | 33.9 | 1 | 23.0 | 1 | | | 6.4 | 0 | 3 |
| Maybole, North Carrick and Coylton | 35.5 | 1 | 32.0 | 1 | 12.4 | 0 | 17.7 | 1 | 2.5 | 0 | 3 |
| Girvan and South Carrick | 28.0 | 1 | 24.9 | 1 | 8.8 | 0 | 37.2 | 1 | 1.2 | 0 | 3 |
| Total | 32.6 | 10 | 33.4 | 9 | 16.3 | 5 | 15.3 | 4 | 2.2 | 0 | 28 |

=== Seats changing hands ===
Below is a list of seats which elected a different party or parties from 2017 in order to highlight the change in political composition of the council from the previous election. The list does not include defeated incumbents who resigned or defected from their party and subsequently failed re-election while the party held the seat.

Seats changing hands
| Seat | 2017 | | 2022 | |
| Seat | Party | Member | Party | Member |
|---|---|---|---|---|
| Prestwick | Conservative | Hugh Hunter | Independent | Hugh Hunter |
| Ayr West | Conservative | Derek McCabe | Independent | Bob Shields |

Notes

1. Note 1: In 2017, Hugh Hunter was elected as a Conservative candidate but was later deselected and stood as an independent in 2022.

== Ward results ==
=== Troon ===
The Conservatives (2), the SNP (1) and Labour (1) retained the seats they won at the previous election.

Troon - 4 seats
| Party | Candidate | FPv% | Count | | | | | | | |
| Party | Candidate | FPv% | 1 | 2 | 3 | 4 | 5 | 6 | 7 | 8 |
|---|---|---|---|---|---|---|---|---|---|---|
| SNP | Craig MacKay (incumbent) | 23.0 | 1,607 | | | | | | | |
| Labour | Philip Saxton (incumbent) | 19.2 | 1,342 | 1,352 | 1,405 | | | | | |
| Conservative | Bob Pollock (incumbent) | 16.2 | 1,131 | 1,134 | 1,146 | 1,147 | 1,209 | 1,463 | | |
| Conservative | Kenneth Bell | 14.5 | 1,015 | 1,016 | 1,029 | 1,029 | 1,074 | 1,275 | 1,335 | 1,497 |
| SNP | Annie McIndoe | 12.8 | 898 | 1,080 | 1,120 | 1,122 | 1,184 | 1,192 | 1,193 | |
| Conservative | Rose Hall | 6.5 | 459 | 459 | 466 | 466 | 496 | | | |
| Liberal Democrats | Judith Godden | 4.7 | 329 | 333 | 373 | 376 | | | | |
| Independent | Linda Lunan | 2.8 | 198 | 200 | | | | | | |
Electorate: 13,025 Valid: 6,979 Spoilt: 128 Quota: 1,396 Turnout: 54.6%

=== Prestwick ===
The Conservatives held one of the two seats they won at the previous election and lost one to independent candidate Hugh Hunter while the SNP and Labour retained the seats they had won at the previous election. In 2017, Hugh Hunter was elected as a Conservative candidate.

Prestwick - 4 seats
| Party | Candidate | FPv% | Count | | | | | | | |
| Party | Candidate | FPv% | 1 | 2 | 3 | 4 | 5 | 6 | 7 | 8 |
|---|---|---|---|---|---|---|---|---|---|---|
| SNP | Ian Cochrane (incumbent) | 25.5 | 1,685 | | | | | | | |
| Independent | Hugh Hunter (incumbent) | 23.2 | 1,544 | | | | | | | |
| Conservative | Martin Kilbride | 17.0 | 1,132 | 1,135 | 1,195 | 1,236 | 1,239 | 1,726 | | |
| Labour | Cameron Ramsay | 15.3 | 1,020 | 1,038 | 1,077 | 1,086 | 1,100 | 1,114 | 1,181 | 1,591 |
| SNP | Norrie Smith | 9.2 | 614 | 928 | 955 | 958 | 995 | 997 | 1,002 | |
| Conservative | Derek Stillie | 7.3 | 488 | 488 | 516 | 539 | 544 | | | |
| Alba | John Caddis | 1.1 | 78 | 84 | 90 | 91 | | | | |
| Conservative | Owen Daniel North | 1.0 | 71 | 72 | 79 | | | | | |
Electorate: 12,507 Valid: 6,642 Spoilt: 107 Quota: 1,329 Turnout: 54.0%

=== Ayr North ===
The SNP (2), Labour (1) and the Conservatives (1) retained the seats they had won at the previous election.

Ayr North - 4 seats
| Party | Candidate | FPv% | Count | | | | | | |
| Party | Candidate | FPv% | 1 | 2 | 3 | 4 | 5 | 6 | 7 |
|---|---|---|---|---|---|---|---|---|---|
| SNP | Laura Brennan-Whitefield (incumbent) | 38.8 | 1,913 | | | | | | |
| Labour | Ian Cavana (incumbent) | 24.0 | 1,185 | | | | | | |
| Conservative | Ian Davis (incumbent) | 13.7 | 675 | 687 | 715 | 719 | 723 | 745 | 1,046 |
| SNP | Mark Dixon | 6.9 | 344 | 1,143 | | | | | |
| Conservative | David Paterson | 6.8 | 336 | 341 | 349 | 352 | 354 | 367 | |
| Independent | Andrew Russell | 6.2 | 309 | 326 | 346 | 365 | 403 | 462 | 481 |
| Liberal Democrats | Mason Graham | 1.6 | 80 | 90 | 137 | 156 | 172 | | |
| Alba | Denise Sommerville | 1.6 | 79 | 90 | 94 | 124 | | | |
Electorate: 12,973 Valid: 4,921 Spoilt: 166 Quota: 985 Turnout: 39.2%

=== Ayr East ===
The SNP, Labour and the Conservatives retained the seats they won at the previous election.

Ayr East - 3 seats
| Party | Candidate | FPv% | Count | | | | | | | | |
| Party | Candidate | FPv% | 1 | 2 | 3 | 4 | 5 | 6 | 7 | 8 | 9 |
|---|---|---|---|---|---|---|---|---|---|---|---|
| SNP | Chris Cullen (incumbent) | 27.8 | 1,377 | | | | | | | | |
| Conservative | Mary Kilpatrick (incumbent) | 19.4 | 959 | 960 | 980 | 1,003 | 1,024 | 1,068 | 1,565 | | |
| Labour | Brian McGinley (incumbent) | 16.4 | 814 | 820 | 860 | 888 | 919 | 992 | 1,021 | 1,108 | 1,408 |
| SNP | Ian Douglas | 11.2 | 556 | 676 | 684 | 703 | 727 | 779 | 783 | 791 | |
| Conservative | Alan Lamont | 10.5 | 520 | 520 | 525 | 545 | 560 | 584 | | | |
| Independent | Chic Brodie | 4.7 | 232 | 233 | 236 | 268 | 364 | | | | |
| Independent | Andrew Bryden | 3.7 | 185 | 187 | 204 | 245 | | | | | |
| Independent | David John Ramsay | 3.6 | 180 | 181 | 189 | | | | | | |
| Liberal Democrats | Deirdre Kennedy | 2.2 | 113 | 114 | | | | | | | |
Electorate: 10,276 Valid: 4,936 Spoilt: 95 Quota: 1,235 Turnout: 49.0%

=== Ayr West ===
The Conservatives retained two of the three seats they won at the previous election and lost one to independent candidate Bob Shields while the SNP retained their only seat.

Ayr West - 4 seats
| Party | Candidate | FPv% | Count | | | | | | | | |
| Party | Candidate | FPv% | 1 | 2 | 3 | 4 | 5 | 6 | 7 | 8 | 9 |
|---|---|---|---|---|---|---|---|---|---|---|---|
| Conservative | Martin Dowey (incumbent) | 27.1 | 2,271 | | | | | | | | |
| Independent | Bob Shields | 22.8 | 1,909 | | | | | | | | |
| SNP | George Weir | 14.5 | 1,217 | 1,218 | 1,237 | 1,252 | 1,275 | 1,282 | 1,870 | | |
| Labour | John Duncan | 10.9 | 915 | 930 | 961 | 981 | 1,117 | 1,140 | 1,165 | 1,247 | |
| Conservative | Lee Lyons (incumbent) | 8.3 | 699 | 1,113 | 1,164 | 1,199 | 1,235 | 1,646 | 1,649 | 1,652 | 1,893 |
| SNP | Margaret Weir | 7.3 | 614 | 614 | 624 | 628 | 653 | 655 | | | |
| Conservative | Derek McCabe (incumbent) | 4.0 | 341 | 465 | 503 | 515 | 548 | | | | |
| Liberal Democrats | Jamie Ross | 3.5 | 295 | 305 | 341 | 349 | | | | | |
| Scottish Family | Gordon Hawley Bryce | 1.2 | 108 | 111 | 118 | | | | | | |
Electorate: 14,541 Valid: 8,369 Spoilt: 133 Quota: 1,674 Turnout: 58.5%

=== Kyle ===
The SNP, Labour and the Conservatives retained the seats they won at the previous election.

Kyle - 3 seats
| Party | Candidate | FPv% | Count | | | | | |
| Party | Candidate | FPv% | 1 | 2 | 3 | 4 | 5 | 6 |
|---|---|---|---|---|---|---|---|---|
| SNP | Julie Dettbarn (incumbent) | 33.9 | 1,635 | | | | | |
| Labour | Duncan Townson | 23.0 | 1,110 | 1,236 | | | | |
| Conservative | Stephen Ferry | 19.8 | 955 | 964 | 967 | 971 | 1,072 | 1,836 |
| Conservative | Arthur Spurling (incumbent) | 16.8 | 814 | 823 | 826 | 830 | 879 | |
| Liberal Democrats | John Aitken | 4.8 | 235 | 288 | 299 | 365 | | |
| Alba | Geoff Bush | 1.4 | 71 | 154 | 156 | | | |
Electorate: 10,625 Valid: 4,820 Spoilt: 57 Quota: 1,206 Turnout: 45.9%

=== Maybole, North Carrick and Coylton ===
The SNP, the Conservatives and independent candidate Brian Connolly retained the seats they won at the previous election.

Maybole, North Carrick and Coylton - 3 seats
| Party | Candidate | FPv% | Count | | | | | |
| Party | Candidate | FPv% | 1 | 2 | 3 | 4 | 5 | 6 |
|---|---|---|---|---|---|---|---|---|
| SNP | William James Grant (incumbent) | 31.9 | 1,370 | | | | | |
| Conservative | Ian Campbell (incumbent) | 20.9 | 895 | 903 | 914 | 1,435 | | |
| Independent | Brian Connolly (incumbent) | 17.6 | 756 | 857 | 892 | 920 | 1,043 | 1,402 |
| Conservative | Laura McEwan | 14.5 | 623 | 629 | 635 | | | |
| Labour | Nicola Saxton | 12.4 | 532 | 598 | 651 | 690 | 752 | |
| Liberal Democrats | Stephen Ralph | 2.4 | 106 | 130 | | | | |
Electorate: 9,316 Valid: 4,282 Spoilt: 74 Quota: 1,071 Turnout: 46.8%

=== Girvan and South Carrick ===
Independent candidate Alec Clark, the SNP and the Conservatives held the seats they won at the previous election.

Girvan and South Carrick - 3 seats
| Party | Candidate | FPv% | Count | | | | | | |
| Party | Candidate | FPv% | 1 | 2 | 3 | 4 | 5 | 6 | 7 |
|---|---|---|---|---|---|---|---|---|---|
| Independent | Alec Clark (incumbent) | 31.4 | 1,277 | | | | | | |
| SNP | Peter Henderson (incumbent) | 24.8 | 1,008 | 1,071 | | | | | |
| Conservative | Gavin Scott | 14.1 | 573 | 600 | 601 | 607 | 684 | 753 | 1,371 |
| Conservative | Linda Kane | 13.8 | 563 | 591 | 592 | 594 | 620 | 734 | |
| Labour | Aaron Gilpin | 8.8 | 358 | 398 | 410 | 423 | 508 | | |
| Independent | Todor Joseph Radic | 5.6 | 230 | 286 | 296 | 321 | | | |
| Alba | Eileen Spence | 1.1 | 47 | 51 | 61 | | | | |
Electorate: 8,849 Valid: 4,056 Spoilt: 75 Quota: 1,015 Turnout: 46.7%

== Aftermath ==
It had initially been expected that the ruling SNP-Labour-Independent administration would continue to run the council, but discussions broke down between the parties amid Labour's claims of a "political stitch-up". As a result, the SNP planned to run the council as a minority administration on a "collaboration and consensus basis". However, the Conservative group formed a minority administration and took control of the council after the first full-council meeting thanks to Labour abstentions. The party also had the support of two of the local authority's four independents.

In June 2023, both the SNP and Labour groups made changes to their leadership. Cllr Peter Henderson, leader of the SNP group, retired as a councillor due to "personal ill-health" which triggered a by-election in Girvan and South Carrick. He was replaced by Cllr William Grant as the SNP group leader. Labour group leader Cllr Brian McGinley was replaced in the role by Cllr Duncan Townson.

Ayr East councillor Chris Cullen defected from the SNP to the Alba Party in October 2023 saying the party had "failed to deliver on independence".

At some point in late 2023 or early 2024, Ayr North councillor Mark Dixon left the SNP to sit as an independent. He has stated on social media that he is now a member of the Greens but the party do not allow members who have defected from other parties to formally sit under their banner so he remains an independent on the council.

In July 2024, Cllr Stephen Ferry resigned from the Conservatives to sit as an independent councillor and from his position as education portfolio holder. A deal was subsequently struck between the Conservative administration and Cllr Grant – who resigned from his position as SNP group leader and from the party to sit as an independent – which would see him return as education portfolio holder, a position he held while the SNP were in administration before the 2022 election.

Cllr Martin Dowey was forced to temporarily stand down as council leader in April 2025 when he became embroiled in a contracts scandal after being recorded allegedly promising to help his friends win demolition contracts. The subsequent political fallout saw Cllr Ian Campbell resign as Provost during a meeting which saw independent councillor Brian Connolly replace Cllr Bob Pollock as depute leader. Cllr Pollock resigned from the Conservative party to sit as an independent and he was subsequently joined by Cllr Campbell, Cllr Gavin Scott and Cllr Mary Kilpatrick. Cllr Connolly was eventually elected to replace Cllr Dowey as council leader and Cllr Campbell was reinstated as Provost. Cllr Ian Davis, who replaced Cllr Dowey as leader of the Conservative group, resigned from the party to sit as an independent after Cllr Dowey was allowed back into the group. Cllr Dowey faced no criminal action following a police investigation and he was reinstated to leader of the Conservative group in November 2025.

Cllr Scott intended to defect to Reform UK but remained an independent member of the council.

=== Girvan and South Carrick by-election ===
Cllr Henderson stood down on 30 June 2023 and a by-election took place on 21 September 2023. This resulted in a Conservative gain from the SNP and Alan Lamont was elected on the fourth count.

Girvan and South Carrick by-election (21 September 2023) - 1 seat
| Party | Candidate | FPv% | Count | | | |
| Party | Candidate | FPv% | 1 | 2 | 3 | 4 |
|---|---|---|---|---|---|---|
| Conservative | Alan Lamont | 47.5 | 1,315 | 1,323 | 1,346 | 1,497 |
| SNP | Joseph McLaughlin | 28.1 | 778 | 802 | 824 | 947 |
| Labour | Nicola Saxton | 18.0 | 499 | 507 | 551 | |
| Liberal Democrats | Jamie Ross | 3.9 | 108 | 113 | | |
| Alba | Denise Sommerville | 2.5 | 70 | | | |
Electorate: 8,648 Valid: 2,770 Spoilt: 32 Quota: 1,386 Turnout: 32.4%

=== Ayr North by-election ===
In July 2025, independent Ayr North councillor Mark Dixon died. A by-election was held on 16 October 2025 and was won by independent businessman Wullie Hogg.

Ayr North by-election (16 October 2025) - 1 seat
| Party | Candidate | FPv% | Count | | | | | | | |
| Party | Candidate | FPv% | 1 | 2 | 3 | 4 | 5 | 6 | 7 | 8 |
|---|---|---|---|---|---|---|---|---|---|---|
| Independent | Wullie Hogg | 25.1 | 850 | 864 | 871 | 924 | 952 | 1,138 | 1,325 | 1,699 |
| SNP | Ian Douglas | 23.3 | 790 | 802 | 818 | 835 | 847 | 898 | 1,075 | |
| Labour | John Duncan | 20.4 | 691 | 696 | 713 | 738 | 775 | 830 | | |
| Reform | Andrew Russell | 17.2 | 584 | 584 | 589 | 607 | 642 | | | |
| Conservative | David Paterson | 5.7 | 195 | 196 | 199 | 211 | | | | |
| Independent | David Petrie | 4.5 | 151 | 157 | 160 | | | | | |
| Liberal Democrats | Mason Graham | 2.1 | 73 | 74 | | | | | | |
| Independent | Orhan Bulikj | 1.5 | 51 | | | | | | | |
Electorate: 12,653 Valid: 3,385 Spoilt: 37 Quota: 1,693 Turnout: 27%
