= Ayr East (ward) =

Electoral ward in South Ayrshire, Scotland

- South Ayrshire
- Boundary of Ayr East in South Ayrshire from 2017.
- Population: 12,194 (2021)
- Electorate: 10,276 (2022)
- Major settlements: Ayr (part of)
- Scottish Parliament constituency: Ayr
- Scottish Parliament region: South Scotland
- UK Parliament constituency: Ayr, Carrick and Cumnock

Current ward
- Created: 2007
- Number of councillors: 3
- Councillor: Chris Cullen (SNP)
- Councillor: Mary Kilpatrick (Conservative)
- Councillor: Brian McGinley (Labour)
- Created from: Ayr Belmont; Ayr Central; Ayr Forehill; Ayr Masonhill; Ayr Old Belmont

Ayr East is one of the eight electoral wards of South Ayrshire Council, Scotland. Originally a four-member ward, Ayr East was reduced in size following a boundary review and has elected three councillors since the 2017 South Ayrshire Council election.

The area produced strong results for both the Scottish National Party (SNP) and the Conservatives prior to the boundary changes but, since the changes, it has been politically split between the SNP, the Conservatives and Labour with each party holding one seat at each subsequent election.

== Boundaries ==
The ward was created following the Fourth Statutory Reviews of Electoral Arrangements ahead of the 2007 Scottish local elections. As a result of the Local Governance (Scotland) Act 2004, local elections in Scotland would use the single transferable vote electoral system from 2007 onwards so Ayr East was formed from an amalgamation of several previous first-past-the-post wards.

It contained all of the former Ayr Belmont, Ayr Forehill and Ayr Masonhill wards, the majority of the former Ayr Old Belmont ward and the southeastern part of the former Ayr Central ward. The ward centres on the eastern portion of the town of Ayr which is situated on the Firth of Clyde coast in the northwest of the council area. It originally contained everything in the town south of the River Ayr, east of Carrick Road/Monument Road and north of the Rozelle Estate. Following the Fifth Statutory Reviews of Electoral Arrangements ahead of the 2017 Scottish local elections, the ward's western boundary was amended east to run along the Glasgow South Western railway line. As a result, the ward was reduced from a four-member ward to a three-member ward.

== Councillors ==
Year	Councillors			
2007	Ian Douglas (SNP)	Mary Kilpatrick (Conservative)	Eddie Bulik (Labour/ Independent)	Winifred Sloan (Conservative)
2009	Ian Douglas (SNP)	Mary Kilpatrick (Conservative)	Eddie Bulik (Labour/ Independent)	Winifred Sloan (Conservative)
2012	Ian Douglas (SNP)	Mary Kilpatrick (Conservative)	Brian McGinley (Labour)	Corri Wilson (SNP)
2015	Ian Douglas (SNP)	Mary Kilpatrick (Conservative)	Brian McGinley (Labour)	John Wallace (SNP)
2017	Chris Cullen (SNP / Alba) (Note: Elected as SNP; defected to Alba in 2023)	Mary Kilpatrick (Conservative)	Brian McGinley (Labour)	
2022	Chris Cullen (SNP / Alba)	Mary Kilpatrick (Conservative)	Brian McGinley (Labour)	
2023	Chris Cullen (SNP / Alba)	Mary Kilpatrick (Conservative)	Brian McGinley (Labour)	

== Election results ==
=== 2022 election ===
Ayr East - 3 seats
Party	Candidate	FPv%	Count								
Party	Candidate	FPv%	1	2	3	4	5	6	7	8	9
SNP	Chris Cullen (incumbent)	27.8	1,377								
Conservative	Mary Kilpatrick (incumbent)	19.4	959	960	980	1,003	1,024	1,068	1,565		
Labour	Brian McGinley (incumbent)	16.4	814	820	860	888	919	992	1,021	1,108	1,408
SNP	Ian Douglas	11.2	556	676	684	703	727	779	783	791	
Conservative	Alan Lamont	10.5	520	520	525	545	560	584			
Independent	Chic Brodie	4.7	232	233	236	268	364				
Independent	Andrew Bryden	3.7	185	187	204	245					
Independent	David John Ramsay	3.6	180	181	189						
Liberal Democrats	Deirdre Kennedy	2.2	113	114							
Electorate: 10,276 Valid: 4,936 Spoilt: 95 Quota: 1,235 Turnout: 49.0%

=== 2017 election ===
Ayr East - 3 seats
Party	Candidate	FPv%	Count				
Party	Candidate	FPv%	1	2	3	4	5
Conservative	Mary Kilpatrick (incumbent)	40.5	2,110				
SNP	Chris Cullen	22.1	1,148	1,165	1,223	1,233	1,926
Labour	Brian McGinley (incumbent)	17.3	900	1,141	1,356		
SNP	Ian McPherson	14.5	753	767	801	810	
Independent	Andrew Bryden	5.6	293	500			
Electorate: 10,029 Valid: 5,204 Spoilt: 49 Quota: 1,302 Turnout: 51.5%

=== 2015 by-election ===
Ayr East by-election (17 September 2015) - 1 seat
Party	Candidate	FPv%	Count			
Party	Candidate	FPv%	1	2	3	4
Conservative	Dan McCroskrie	38.5	1,527	1,534	1,589	1,740
SNP	John Wallace	38.0	1,507	1,540	1,600	1,775
Labour	Susan Wilson	16.2	642	654	708	
Independent	Andrew Bryden	5.5	218	227		
Green	Boyd Murdoch	1.9	76			
Electorate: 11,638 Valid: 3,970 Spoilt: 36 Quota: 1,986 Turnout: 34.4%

=== 2012 election ===
Ayr East - 4 seats
Party	Candidate	FPv%	Count						
Party	Candidate	FPv%	1	2	3	4	5	6	7
SNP	Ian Douglas (incumbent)	24.2	1,238						
Labour	Brian McGinley	23.4	1,199						
Conservative	Mary Kilpatrick (incumbent)	22.2	1,135						
Conservative	Patricia McKeand	10.8	554	557	571	665	691	758	
SNP	Corri Wilson (Note: Cllr Corri Wilson was elected as MP for Ayr, Carrick and Cumnock on 7 May 2015 and subsequently resigned her council seat on 23 June 2015.)	7.2	371	552	583	586	664	788	902
Independent	Andrew Bryden	6.5	331	337	364	367	495		
Independent	Eddie Bulik (incumbent)	5.7	291	298	323	326			
Electorate: 11,669 Valid: 5,119 Spoilt: 84 Quota: 1,024 Turnout: 43.9%

=== 2007 election ===
Ayr East – 4 seats
Party	Candidate	FPv%	Count				
Party	Candidate	FPv%	1	2	3	4	5
SNP	Ian Douglas	27.6	1,933				
Conservative	Winifred Sloan	21.7	1,516				
Labour	Eddie Bulik	18.4	1,286	1,354	1,356	???	???
Conservative	Mary Kilpatrick	17.4	1,220	1,318	1,416		
Labour	Gerry Crawley	12.3	861	937	940	???	???
Solidarity	James Stewart	2.6	183	269	270	???	
Valid: 6,999 Quota: 1,400
