= 2017 South Ayrshire Council election =

South Ayrshire Council election

- 4 May 2017

All 28 seats to South Ayrshire Council 15 seats needed for a majority
- Registered: 89,490
- Turnout: 52.1%
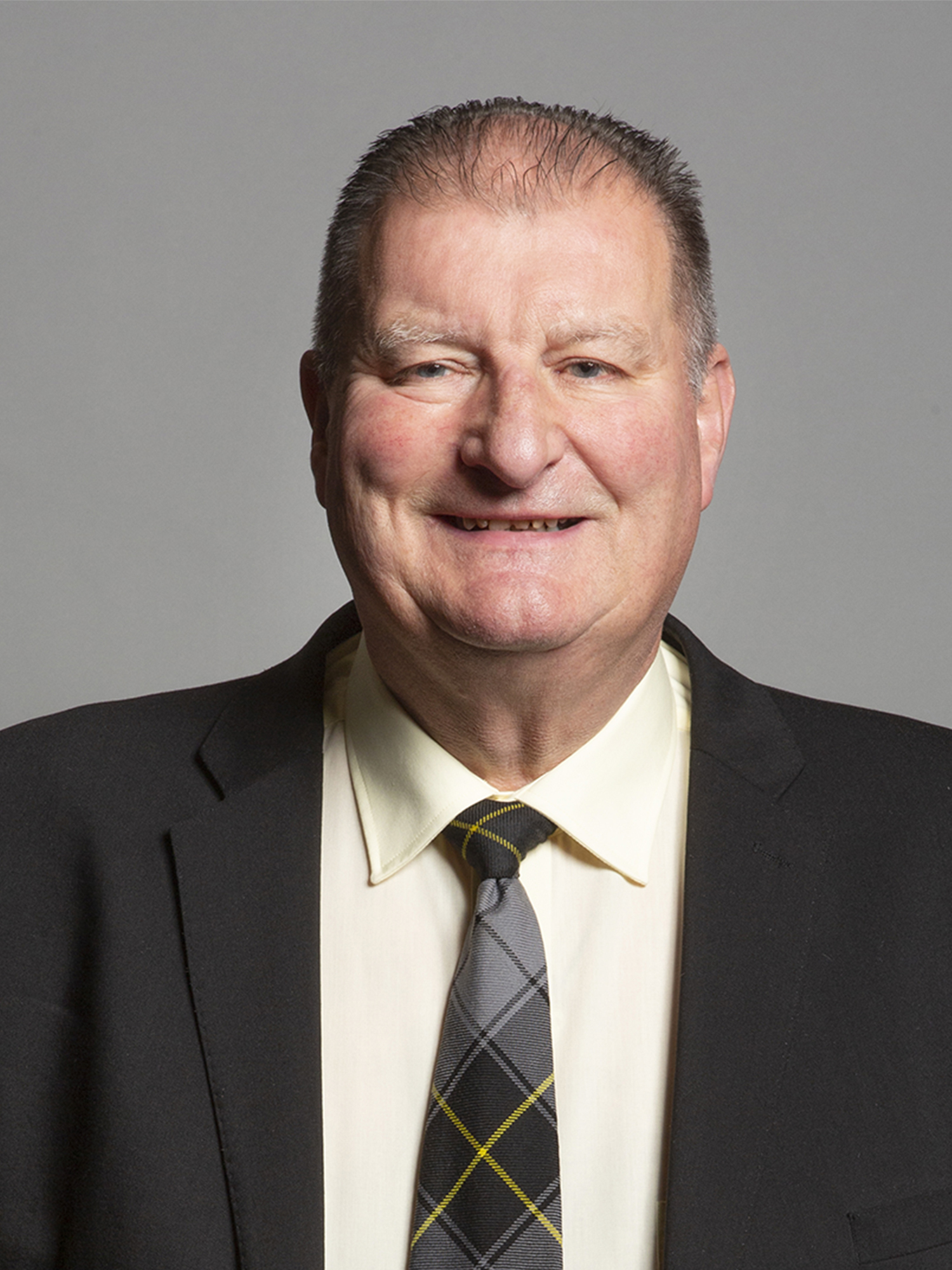

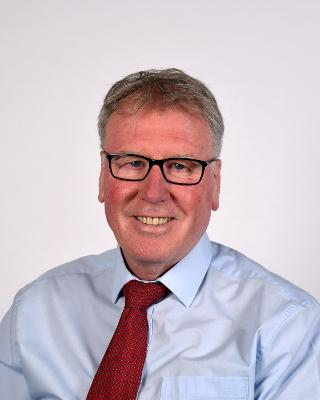
	First party	Second party
	Con
Leader	Martin Dowey	Allan Dorans
Party	Conservative	SNP
Leader's seat	Ayr West	Ayr West (defeated)
Last election	10 seats, 31.5%	9 seats, 29.3%
Seats before	10	9
Seats won	12	9
Seat change	▲2	Steady
Popular vote	19,851	13,808
Percentage	43.4%	30.2%
Swing	▲11.9%	▲0.9%
	Third party	Fourth party
		Ind
Leader	Brian McGinley	Brian Connolly
Party	Labour	Independent
Leader's seat	Ayr East	Maybole, North Carrick and Coylton
Last election	9 seats, 25.0%	2 seat, 13.5%
Seats before	9	2
Seats won	5	2
Seat change	▼4	Steady
Popular vote	6,954	4,879
Percentage	15.2%	10.7%
Swing	▼9.8%	▼2.8%
- The 8 multi-member wards
Council Leader before election
Bill McIntosh
(Conservative)
No overall control
Council Leader after election
Douglas Campbell
(SNP)
No overall control

The 2017 South Ayrshire Council election took place on 4 May 2017 on the same day as the 31 other Scottish local government elections. As with other Scottish council elections, it was held using single transferable vote (STV) – a form of proportional representation – in which multiple candidates are elected in each ward and voters rank candidates in order of preference.

The Conservatives retained their position as the largest party returning 12 councillors - two more than in the previous election. The Scottish National Party (SNP) maintained their total of nine councillors to remain as the second party while Labour lost four seats. The number of independents returned remained at two.

Following the election, a coalition administration was formed between the SNP, Labour and Independent councillors, even though the Conservatives remained the largest party on the council.

== Background ==
The total number of seats on South Ayrshire Council was reduced as part of a Fifth Statutory Reviews of Electoral Arrangements by the Local Government Boundary Commission for Scotland from 30 to 28, with the total number of council wards remaining at 8. Both the Ayr East and Maybole, North Carrick and Coylton wards saw the number of seats reduced from four to three.

== Results ==
2017 South Ayrshire Council election result
Party	Seats	Gains	Losses	Net gain/loss	Seats %	Votes %	Votes	+/−
Conservative	12	2	0	▲2	42.9	43.4	19,851	▲11.9
SNP	9	1	1	Steady	32.1	30.2	13,808	▲0.9
Labour	5	0	4	▼4	17.9	15.2	6,954	▼9.8
Independent	2	0	0	Steady	7.1	10.7	4,879	▼2.8
Green	0	0	0	Steady	0.0	0.6	290	New
Total	28						45,782	

Note: "Votes" are the first preference votes. The net gain/loss and percentage changes relate to the result of the previous Scottish local elections on 3 May 2012. This may differ from other published sources showing gain/loss relative to seats held at dissolution of Scotland's councils.

=== Ward summary ===
Results of the 2017 South Ayrshire Council election by ward
Ward	%	Cllrs	%	Cllrs	%	Cllrs	%	Cllrs	%	Cllrs	Total Cllrs
Ward	Conservative		SNP		Lab		Ind		Green		Total Cllrs
Troon	51.5	2	30.61	1	13.71	1			4.2	0	4
Prestwick	46.2	2	31.3	1	13.3	1	9.1	0			4
Ayr North	25.6	1	43.7	2	24.7	1	6.1	0			4
Ayr East	40.5	1	36.5	1	17.3	1	5.6	0			3
Ayr West	59.2	3	23.4	1	11.1	0	6.2	0			4
Kyle	43.8	1	31.0	1	25.3	1					3
Maybole, North Carrick and Coylton	36.4	1	27.7	1	9.4	0	26.5	1			3
Girvan and South Carrick	26.7	1	19.3	1	9.4	0	44.5	1			3
Total	43.4	12	30.2	9	15.2	5	10.7	2	0.6	0	28

== Ward results ==
=== Troon ===
The Conservatives (2), the SNP (1) and Labour (1) retained the seats they won at the previous election.

Troon - 4 seats
Party	Candidate	FPv%	Count				
Party	Candidate	FPv%	1	2	3	4	5
Conservative	Peter Convery (incumbent)	35.2	2,446				
Conservative	Bob Pollock	16.3	1,135	2,017			
SNP	Craig Mackay	16.2	1,125	1,146	1,157	1,216	2,201
SNP	Annie McIndoe	14.5	1,005	1,016	1,025	1,117	
Labour	Philip Saxton (incumbent)	13.7	951	1,011	1,194	1,304	1,385
Green	Boyd Murdoch	4.2	290	310	371		
Electorate: 12,132 Valid: 6,952 Spoilt: 128 Quota: 1,391 Turnout: 57.2%

=== Prestwick ===
The Conservatives (2), the SNP (1) and Labour (1) retained the seats they won at the previous election.

Prestwick - 4 seats
Party	Candidate	FPv%	Count					
Party	Candidate	FPv%	1	2	3	4	5	6
Conservative	Hugh Hunter (incumbent)	29.9	2,008					
SNP	Ian Cochrane (incumbent)	22.3	1,498					
Conservative	Margaret Toner (incumbent)	16.3	1,098	1,641				
Labour	Helen Moonie (incumbent)	13.3	895	932	990	1,000	1,255	1,615
SNP	John Wallace (Note: Sitting councillor for Ayr East.)	9.1	612	618	625	749	897	
Independent	Alasdair John Malcolm	9.1	611	649	719	726		
Electorate: 12,085 Valid: 6,722 Spoilt: 172 Quota: 1,345 Turnout: 55.1%

=== Ayr North ===
Labour retained one of the two seats they had won at the previous election while the SNP and the Conservatives retained the seats they had won at the previous election and the SNP gained one seat from Labour.

Ayr North - 4 seats
Party	Candidate	FPv%	Count		
Party	Candidate	FPv%	1	2	3
Conservative	Ian Davis	25.6	1,258		
SNP	Laura Brennan-Whitefield	25.5	1,256		
Labour	Ian Cavana (incumbent)	19.5	958	1,015	
SNP	Douglas Campbell (incumbent)	18.1	892	902	1,138
Independent	Jamie McGeechan	6.1	300	363	375
Labour	Brenda Knox	5.2	256	286	291
Electorate: 13,106 Valid: 4,920 Spoilt: 158 Quota: 985 Turnout: 39.6%

=== Ayr East ===
Due to boundary changes, Ayr East lost one seat. As a result, each of the parties that won seats at the previous election (the SNP, the Conservatives and Labour) all held one seat and the SNP lost their second seat.

Ayr East - 3 seats
Party	Candidate	FPv%	Count				
Party	Candidate	FPv%	1	2	3	4	5
Conservative	Mary Kilpatrick (incumbent)	40.5	2,110				
SNP	Chris Cullen	22.1	1,148	1,165	1,223	1,233	1,926
Labour	Brian McGinley (incumbent)	17.3	900	1,141	1,356		
SNP	Ian McPherson	14.5	753	767	801	810	
Independent	Andrew Bryden	5.6	293	500			
Electorate: 10,029 Valid: 5,204 Spoilt: 49 Quota: 1,302 Turnout: 51.5%

=== Ayr West ===
The Conservatives (2) and the SNP (1) retained the seats they had won at the previous election while the Conservatives gained one seat from Labour.

Ayr West - 4 seats
Party	Candidate	FPv%	Count						
Party	Candidate	FPv%	1	2	3	4	5	6	7
Conservative	Martin Dowey	38.7	3,160						
SNP	Siobhian Brown	15.5	1,267	1,276	1,276	1,376	2,006		
Conservative	Lee Lyons	12.3	1,006	1,847					
Labour	Liz Martin	11.1	911	952	961	1,071	1,103	1,248	
Conservative	Derek McCabe	8.3	675	1,211	1,400	1,530	1,547	1,560	1,865
SNP	Allan Dorans (incumbent)	7.9	646	653	654	723			
Independent	Chic Brodie	6.2	506	530	535				
Electorate: 13,822 Valid: 8,171 Spoilt: 138 Quota: 1,635 Turnout: 59.4%

=== Kyle ===
The SNP, Labour and the Conservatives retained the seats they won at the previous election.

Kyle - 3 seats
Party	Candidate	FPv%	Count			
Party	Candidate	FPv%	1	2	3	4
Conservative	Arthur Spurling	43.8	2,160			
Labour	Andy Campbell (incumbent)	25.3	1,247			
SNP	Julie Dettbarn	16.4	807	876	879	1,612
SNP	Scott McFarlane	14.6	721	811	813	
Electorate: 10,215 Valid: 4,935 Spoilt: 74 Quota: 1,234 Turnout: 48.7%

=== Maybole, North Carrick and Coylton ===
Due to boundary changes, Ayr East lost one seat. As a result, the SNP, the Conservatives and independent candidate Brian Connolly retained the seats they won at the previous election and Labour lost their seat.

Maybole, North Carrick and Coylton - 3 seats
Party	Candidate	FPv%	Count	
Party	Candidate	FPv%	1	2
Conservative	Ian Campbell	36.4	1,584	
SNP	William Grant (incumbent)	27.7	1,202	
Independent	Brian Connolly (incumbent)	20.8	904	1,089
Labour	Catriona Deliveli	9.4	408	478
Independent	Gordon McFadzean	5.7	249	318
Electorate: 9,359 Valid: 4,347 Spoilt: 45 Quota: 1,087 Turnout: 48.1%

=== Girvan and South Carrick ===
The SNP and independent councillor Alec Clark retained the seats they had won at the previous election while the Conservatives gained one seat from Labour.

Girvan and South Carrick - 3 seats
Party	Candidate	FPv%	Count					
Party	Candidate	FPv%	1	2	3	4	5	6
Independent	Alec Clark (incumbent)	33.1	1,502					
Conservative	Ian Fitzsimmons	26.7	1,211					
SNP	Peter Henderson	19.3	876	919	921	933	1,012	1,285
Independent	Karen Clark-McCartney	9.5	429	569	586	636	803	
Labour	Owen Martin	9.4	428	485	497	515		
Independent	Gavin Scott	1.9	85	125	134			
Electorate: 8,742 Valid: 4,531 Spoilt: 76 Quota: 1,133 Turnout: 52.3%
