= Troon (ward) =

Electoral ward in South Ayrshire, Scotland

- South Ayrshire
- Boundary of Troon in South Ayrshire from 2017.
- Population: 14,377 (2021)
- Electorate: 13,025 (2022)
- Major settlements: Troon
- Scottish Parliament constituency: Ayr
- Scottish Parliament region: South Scotland
- UK Parliament constituency: Central Ayrshire

Current ward
- Created: 2007
- Number of councillors: 4
- Councillor: Craig MacKay (SNP)
- Councillor: Philip Saxton (Labour)
- Councillor: Bob Pollock (Conservative)
- Councillor: Kenneth Bell (Conservative)
- Created from: Dundonald and Loans; Troon East; Troon North; Troon South; Troon West

Troon is one of the eight electoral wards of South Ayrshire Council. Created in 2007, the ward elects four councillors using the single transferable vote electoral system and covers an area with a population of 14,377 people.

The area is a Conservative stronghold with the party holding half the seats at every election.

== Boundaries ==
The ward was created following the Fourth Statutory Reviews of Electoral Arrangements ahead of the 2007 Scottish local elections. As a result of the Local Governance (Scotland) Act 2004, local elections in Scotland would use the single transferable vote electoral system from 2007 onwards so Troon was formed from an amalgamation of several previous first-past-the-post wards.

It contained all of the former Troon East, Troon North, Troon South and Troon West wards as well as the western part of the former Dundonald and Loans ward. The ward includes the northwesternmost part of the council area up to its border with North Ayrshire and includes the town of Troon as well as Barassie and the uninhabited Lady Isle in the Firth of Clyde. The ward's boundaries were unchanged following the Fifth Statutory Reviews of Electoral Arrangements ahead of the 2017 Scottish local elections.

== Councillors ==
Election	Councillors			
2007	Peter Convery (Conservative)	Nan McFarlane (SNP)	Philip Saxton (Labour)	Bill McIntosh (Conservative)
2012	Peter Convery (Conservative)	Nan McFarlane (SNP)	Philip Saxton (Labour)	Bill McIntosh (Conservative)
2017	Peter Convery (Conservative)	Craig Mackay (SNP)	Philip Saxton (Labour)	Bob Pollock (Conservative)
2022	Kenneth Bell (Conservative)	Craig Mackay (SNP)	Philip Saxton (Labour)	Bob Pollock (Conservative)

== Election results ==
=== 2022 election ===
Troon - 4 seats
Party	Candidate	FPv%	Count							
Party	Candidate	FPv%	1	2	3	4	5	6	7	8
SNP	Craig MacKay (incumbent)	23.0	1,607							
Labour	Philip Saxton (incumbent)	19.2	1,342	1,352	1,405					
Conservative	Bob Pollock (incumbent)	16.2	1,131	1,134	1,146	1,147	1,209	1,463		
Conservative	Kenneth Bell	14.5	1,015	1,016	1,029	1,029	1,074	1,275	1,335	1,497
SNP	Annie McIndoe	12.8	898	1,080	1,120	1,122	1,184	1,192	1,193	
Conservative	Rose Hall	6.5	459	459	466	466	496			
Liberal Democrats	Judith Godden	4.7	329	333	373	376				
Independent	Linda Lunan	2.8	198	200						
Electorate: 13,025 Valid: 6,979 Spoilt: 128 Quota: 1,396 Turnout: 54.6%

=== 2017 election ===
Troon - 4 seats
Party	Candidate	FPv%	Count				
Party	Candidate	FPv%	1	2	3	4	5
Conservative	Peter Convery (incumbent)	35.2	2,446				
Conservative	Bob Pollock	16.3	1,135	2,017			
SNP	Craig Mackay	16.2	1,125	1,146	1,157	1,216	2,201
SNP	Annie McIndoe	14.5	1,005	1,016	1,025	1,117	
Labour	Philip Saxton (incumbent)	13.7	951	1,011	1,194	1,304	1,385
Scottish Green	Boyd Murdoch	4.2	290	310	371		
Electorate: 12,132 Valid: 6,952 Spoilt: 128 Quota: 1,391 Turnout: 57.2%

=== 2012 election ===
Troon - 4 seats
Party	Candidate	FPv%	Count				
Party	Candidate	FPv%	1	2	3	4	5
Conservative	Peter Convery (incumbent)	22.0	1,289				
Labour	Philip Saxton (incumbent)	21.0	1,233				
Conservative	Bill McIntosh (incumbent)	17.6	1,035	1,130	1,137	1,160	1,207
SNP	Nan McFarlane (incumbent)	17.5	1,026	1,033	1,043	1,495	
Independent	Pat Brown	12.4	730	734	750	801	912
SNP	Elaine McBean Little (Note: Sitting councillor for Ayr West.)	9.4	551	553	557		
Electorate: 12,146 Valid: 5,864 Spoilt: 59 Quota: 1,173 Turnout: 48.3%

=== 2007 election ===
Troon – 4 seats
Party	Candidate	FPv%	Count	
Party	Candidate	FPv%	1	2
Conservative	Peter Convery	27.5	2,029	
SNP	Nan McFarlane	23.9	1,765	
Labour	Philip Saxton	20.3	1,499	
Conservative	Bill McIntosh	14.3	1,061	1,489
Independent	Pat Brown	13.9	1,029	1,084
Valid: 7,383 Quota: 1,477
