= 2007 South Ayrshire Council election =

South Ayrshire Council election

- 3 May 2007

All 30 seats to South Ayrshire Council 16 seats needed for a majority
	First party	Second party
	Con	Lab
Leader	Bill McIntosh
Party	Conservative	Labour
Leader's seat	Troon
Last election	15 seats, 41.5%	15 seats, 36.7%
Seats before	15	15
Seats won	12	9
Seat change	▼3	▼6
Popular vote	18,568	14,152
Percentage	37.2%	28.4%
Swing	▼4.3%	▼8.3%
	Third party	Fourth party
	SNP	Ind
Leader		Brian Connolly
Party	SNP	Independent
Leader's seat		Maybole, North Carrick & Coylton
Last election	0 seats, 17.3%	0 seats, 2.9%
Seats before	0	0
Seats won	8	1
Seat change	▲8	▲1
Popular vote	12,624	4,160
Percentage	25.3%	8.3%
Swing	▲8.0%	▲5.4%
- The 8 multi-member wards
Council Leader before election
Bill McIntosh
(Conservative)
No overall control
Council Leader after election
Bill McIntosh
(Conservative)
No overall control

The 2007 South Ayrshire Council election took place on 3 May 2007 on the same day as the 31 other Scottish local government elections and elections to the Scottish Parliament.

The election was the first to use the 8 new wards created as a result of the Local Governance (Scotland) Act 2004, each ward electing three or four councillors using the single transferable vote system form of proportional representation. The new wards replaced the 30 single-member wards which used the plurality (first past the post) system of election.

The election saw the Conservatives returned as the largest party on the council despite losing three seats. Labour, who had tied with the Conservatives as the largest party in 2003, lost six seats as they became the second-largest party. The Scottish National Party (SNP) picked up their first representation in the area for 30 years as they gained eight seats. The remaining seat was won by an independent candidate.

== Results ==
2007 South Ayrshire Council election result
Party	Seats	Gains	Losses	Net gain/loss	Seats %	Votes %	Votes	+/−
Conservative	12	-	-	▼3	40.0	37.2	18,568	▼4.3
Labour	9	-	-	▼5	30.0	28.4	14,152	▼8.3
SNP	8	-	-	▲8	26.7	25.3	12,624	▲8.0
Independent	1	-	-	▲1	3.3	8.3	4,160	▲5.4
Solidarity	0	-	-	Steady	0.0	0.6	300	New
Scottish Socialist	0	-	-	Steady	0.0	0.1	66	▼1.2
Total	30						49,870	

=== Summary by ward ===
Results of the 2007 South Ayrshire Council election by ward
Ward	%	Cllrs	%	Cllrs	%	Cllrs	%	Cllrs	%	Cllrs	Total Cllrs
Ward	Conservative		Labour		SNP		Independents		Others		Total Cllrs
Troon	41.8	2	20.3	1	23.9	1	13.9	0			4
Prestwick	41.8	2	30.1	1	28.1	1					4
Ayr North	18.4	1	44.7	2	25.0	1	8.8	0	3.0	0	4
Ayr East	39.1	2	30.7	1	27.6	1			2.6	0	4
Ayr West	54.8	2	16.9	1	20.9	1	7.5	0			4
Kyle	34.2	1	32.8	1	21.8	1	11.1	0			3
Maybole, North Carrick and Coylton	24.4	1	26.2	1	24.7	1	24.7	1			4
Girvan and South Carrick	37.3	1	29.6	1	33.1	1					3
Total	37.2	12	28.4	9	25.3	8	8.3	1	0.7	0	30

== Ward results ==
=== Troon ===
Troon – 4 seats
Party	Candidate	FPv%	Count	
Party	Candidate	FPv%	1	2
Conservative	Peter Convery	27.5	2,029	
SNP	Nan McFarlane	23.9	1,765	
Labour	Philip Saxton	20.3	1,499	
Conservative	Bill McIntosh	14.3	1,061	1,489
Independent	Pat Brown	13.9	1,029	1,084
Valid: 7,383 Quota: 1,477

=== Prestwick ===
Prestwick – 4 seats
Party	Candidate	FPv%	Count				
Party	Candidate	FPv%	1	2	3	4	5
SNP	Stan Fisher	28.1	2,062				
Conservative	Hugh Hunter	25.1	1,847				
Labour	Helen Moonie	16.7	1,227	1,350	1,364	???	???
Conservative	Margaret Toner	16.7	1,224	1,350	1,663		
Labour	George Watson	13.4	987	1,071	1,084	???	
Valid: 7,347 Quota: 1,470

=== Ayr North ===
Ayr North – 4 seats
Party	Candidate	FPv%	Count								
Party	Candidate	FPv%	1	2	3	4	5	6	7	8	9
Labour	Douglas Campbell	27.0	1,663								
SNP	Tom Slider	25.0	1,506								
Conservative	John Hampton	18.4	1,108	1,119	1,147	1,151	1,158	1,170	1,186	???	???
Labour	Ian Cavana	11.8	712	1,004	1,040	1,041	1,046	1,056	1,074	???	???
Independent	Rab Hill	7.4	445	457	476	484	511	524	559	???	
Labour	Ian Stewart	5.9	356	412	438	440	441	450	469		
Solidarity	Amanda McFarlane	1.9	117	122	146	150	158	186			
Scottish Socialist	Liz Swan	1.1	66	70	99	102	106				
Independent	Jim McEwan	0.8	50	52	60	74					
Independent	Tommy O'Lone	0.6	37	39	46						
Valid: 6,060 Quota: 1,213

=== Ayr East ===
Ayr East – 4 seats
Party	Candidate	FPv%	Count				
Party	Candidate	FPv%	1	2	3	4	5
SNP	Ian Douglas	27.6	1,933				
Conservative	Winifred Sloan	21.7	1,516				
Labour	Eddie Bulik	18.4	1,286	1,354	1,356	???	???
Conservative	Mary Kilpatrick	17.4	1,220	1,318	1,416		
Labour	Gerry Crawley	12.3	861	937	940	???	???
Solidarity	James Stewart	2.6	183	269	270	???	
Valid: 6,999 Quota: 1,400

=== Ayr West ===
Ayr West – 4 seats
Party	Candidate	FPv%	Count					
Party	Candidate	FPv%	1	2	3	4	5	6
Conservative	Bill Grant	30.3	2,176					
SNP	Mike Peddie	20.9	1,499					
Labour	Elaine Little	16.9	1,213	1,238	1,249	1,384	???	???
Conservative	Robin Reid	15.7	1,127	1,320	1,329	1,479		
Conservative	Alistair Kerr	8.8	634	1,084	1,088	1,168	???	
Independent	Ian McCabe	7.5	537	559	576			
Valid: 7,186 Quota: 1,438

=== Kyle ===
Kyle – 3 seats
Party	Candidate	FPv%	Count				
Party	Candidate	FPv%	1	2	3	4	5
Labour	Andy Campbell	22.7	1,128	1,473			
SNP	John Allan	21.8	1,080	1,112	1,156	1,332	
Conservative	Hywel Davies	18.0	891	905	916	992	???
Conservative	Arthur Spurling	16.2	801	813	822	859	
Independent	Sam Gardiner	11.1	550	565	603		
Labour	Danny Howley	10.1	499				
Valid: 4,949 Quota: 1,238

=== Maybole, North Carrick and Coylton ===
Maybole, North Carrick and Coylton – 4 seats
Party	Candidate	FPv%	Count						
Party	Candidate	FPv%	1	2	3	4	5	6	7
SNP	Mairi Low	24.7	1,411						
Independent	Brian Connolly	24.7	1,410						
Conservative	Ann Galbreith	19.5	1,111	1,138	1,184				
Labour	Sandra Goldie	17.0	970	1,009	1,036	1,037	1,066	???	???
Labour	Peter Mason	9.2	526	552	584	585	613	???	
Conservative	David Steele	4.9	281	297	304	321	349		
Independent	Helen Whitefield	1.8	102	148	213	214			
Valid: 5,811 Quota: 1,163

=== Girvan and South Carrick ===
Girvan and South Carrick – 3 seats
Party	Candidate	FPv%	Count			
Party	Candidate	FPv%	1	2	3	4
Conservative	Iain Fitzsimmons	37.3	1,542			
SNP	Alec Oattes	33.1	1,368			
Labour	John McDowall	17.4	721	832	921	???
Labour	Calum Little	12.2	504	567	611	
Valid: 4,135 Quota: 1,034

== Changes Since 2007 Election ==
- †In May 2008, Ayr West Cllr Elaine Little resigned from the Labour Party and became an Independent. In February 2012 she joined the Scottish National Party.
- ††On 27 May 2008 Ayr North Cllr Douglas Campbell, resigned from the Labour Party and became an Independent. He joined the Scottish National Party on 19 May 2011
- †††On 16 November 2009 Ayr East Cllr Eddie Bulik resigned from the Labour Party and became an Independent.
