= Girvan and South Carrick (ward) =

Electoral ward in South Ayrshire, Scotland

Coordinates: 55.1628°N 4.7646°W

- South Ayrshire
- Boundary of Girvan and South Carrick in South Ayrshire from 2017.
- Population: 10,871 (2021)
- Electorate: 8,648 (2023)
- Major settlements: Girvan
- Scottish Parliament constituency: Carrick, Cumnock and Doon Valley
- Scottish Parliament region: South Scotland
- UK Parliament constituency: Ayr, Carrick and Cumnock

Current ward
- Created: 2007
- Number of councillors: 3
- Councillor: Alec Clark (Independent)
- Councillor: Gavin Scott (Conservative)
- Councillor: Alan Lamont (Conservative)
- Created from: Girvan Ailsa; Girvan Glendoune; South Carrick

Girvan and South Carrick is one of the eight electoral wards of South Ayrshire Council. Created in 2007, the ward elects three councillors using the single transferable vote electoral system and covers an area with a population of 10,871 people.

The ward has produced strong results for both the Scottish National Party (SNP) and the Conservatives with each party taking one seat at every election except in 2012.

== Boundaries ==
The ward was created following the Fourth Statutory Reviews of Electoral Arrangements ahead of the 2007 Scottish local elections. As a result of the Local Governance (Scotland) Act 2004, local elections in Scotland would use the single transferable vote electoral system from 2007 onwards so Girvan and South Carrick was formed from an amalgamation of several previous first-past-the-post wards.

It contained all of the former Girvan Ailsa and Girvan Glendoune wards as well as the vast majority of the former South Carrick ward. The ward includes the southernmost part of the council area on the Firth of Clyde coast and next to the council's borders with East Ayrshire and Dumfries and Galloway. It includes the town of Girvan as well as the uninhabited Ailsa Craig. Following the Fifth Statutory Reviews of Electoral Arrangements ahead of the 2017 Scottish local elections, the ward's northern boundary was amended and an area around Maidens, Turnberry and Kirkoswald was transferred into it from the Maybole, North Carrick and Coylton ward.

== Councillors ==
Election	Councillors		
2007	Ian Fitzsimmons (Conservative)	Alec Oattes (SNP)	John McDowall (Labour)
2012	Alec Clark (Independent)	Alec Oattes (SNP)	John McDowall (Labour)
2017	Alec Clark (Independent)	Peter Henderson (SNP)	Ian Fitzsimmons (Conservative)
2022	Alec Clark (Independent)	Peter Henderson (SNP)	Gavin Scott (Conservative)
2023	Alec Clark (Independent)	Alan Lamont (Conservative)	Gavin Scott (Conservative)

== Election results ==
=== 2023 by-election ===
Girvan and South Carrick by-election (21 September 2023) - 1 seat
Party	Candidate	FPv%	Count			
Party	Candidate	FPv%	1	2	3	4
Conservative	Alan Lamont	47.5	1,315	1,323	1,346	1,497
SNP	Joseph McLaughlin	28.1	778	802	824	947
Labour	Nicola Saxton	18.0	499	507	551	
Liberal Democrats	Jamie Ross	3.9	108	113		
Alba	Denise Sommerville	2.5	70			
Electorate: 8,648 Valid: 2,770 Spoilt: 32 Quota: 1,386 Turnout: 32.4%

=== 2022 election ===
Girvan and South Carrick - 3 seats
Party	Candidate	FPv%	Count						
Party	Candidate	FPv%	1	2	3	4	5	6	7
Independent	Alec Clark (incumbent)	31.4	1,277						
SNP	Peter Henderson (incumbent)	24.8	1,008	1,071					
Conservative	Gavin Scott	14.1	573	600	601	607	684	753	1,371
Conservative	Linda Kane	13.8	563	591	592	594	620	734	
Labour	Aaron Gilpin	8.8	358	398	410	423	508		
Independent	Todor Joseph Radic	5.6	230	286	296	321			
Alba	Eileen Spence	1.1	47	51	61				
Electorate: 8,849 Valid: 4,056 Spoilt: 75 Quota: 1,015 Turnout: 46.7%

=== 2017 election ===
Girvan and South Carrick - 3 seats
Party	Candidate	FPv%	Count					
Party	Candidate	FPv%	1	2	3	4	5	6
Independent	Alec Clark (incumbent)	33.1	1,502					
Conservative	Ian Fitzsimmons	26.7	1,211					
SNP	Peter Henderson	19.3	876	919	921	933	1,012	1,285
Independent	Karen Clark-McCartney	9.5	429	569	586	636	803	
Labour	Owen Martin	9.4	428	485	497	515		
Independent	Gavin Scott	1.9	85	125	134			
Electorate: 8,742 Valid: 4,531 Spoilt: 76 Quota: 1,133 Turnout: 52.3%

=== 2012 election ===
Girvan and South Carrick - 3 seats
Party	Candidate	FPv%	Count		
Party	Candidate	FPv%	1	2	3
Independent	Alec Clark	47.4	1,609		
SNP	Alec Oattes (incumbent)	19.7	670	822	985
Labour	John McDowall (incumbent)	17.0	579	766	956
Conservative	Iain Fitzsimmons (incumbent)	15.8	538	741	
Electorate: 7,920 Valid: 3,396 Spoilt: 31 Quota: 850 Turnout: 42.9%

=== 2007 election ===
Girvan and South Carrick – 3 seats
Party	Candidate	FPv%	Count			
Party	Candidate	FPv%	1	2	3	4
Conservative	Iain Fitzsimmons	37.3	1,542			
SNP	Alec Oattes	33.1	1,368			
Labour	John McDowall	17.4	721	832	921	???
Labour	Calum Little	12.2	504	567	611	
Valid: 4,135 Quota: 1,034
