= South Ayrshire Council =

Unitary authority in South Ayrshire, Scotland

South Ayrshire Council Comhairle Siorrachd Àir a Deas
- Coat of arms

- Council logo

Leadership
- Provost: Iain Campbell, Independent since 20 May 2025
- Leader: Brian Connolly, Independent since 20 May 2025
- Chief Executive: Stephen Penman since September 2025

Structure
- Seats: 28 councillors
- Graph of the party split among 28 seats.
- Political groups: All parties (28) Conservative (5) Labour (5) SNP (5) Independent (13)

Elections
- Voting system: Single transferable vote
- Last election: 5 May 2022
- Next election: 6 May 2027

Meeting place
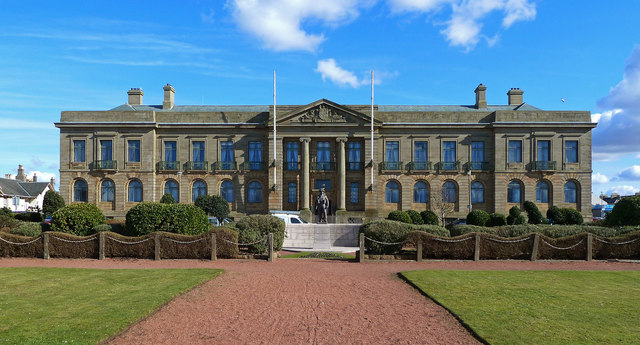
- County Buildings, Wellington Square, Ayr, KA7 1DR

Website
- www.south-ayrshire.gov.uk

South Ayrshire Council (Scottish Gaelic: Comhairle Siorrachd Àir a Deas) is the local authority for South Ayrshire, one of the 32 council areas of Scotland. It was created in 1996, and now comprises eight wards, each with three or four directly elected councillors by the single transferable vote system, which creates a form of proportional representation. The council is based at County Buildings in Ayr.

== History ==
South Ayrshire was created in 1996 under the Local Government etc. (Scotland) Act 1994, which replaced Scotland's previous local government structure of upper-tier regions and lower-tier districts with unitary council areas providing all local government services. South Ayrshire covered the same area as the abolished Kyle and Carrick district, and also took over the functions of the abolished Strathclyde Regional Council within the area. The area's name references its location within the historic county of Ayrshire, which had been abolished for local government purposes in 1975 when Kyle and Carrick district and Strathclyde region had been created.

In April 2025 allegations emerged, based on a leaked audio recording of a private meeting in 2023, that the Conservative leader of the council, Martin Dowey, had used undue influence to help a company in its bid for a demolition contract the council was procuring. Dowey denied any wrongdoing. At a meeting on 1 May 2025, the council passed a motion of no confidence in the deputy leader; a similar motion of no confidence in Dowey's leadership was tabled but not voted on. However, Dowey resigned as leader later that day, as did the council's provost. A few weeks later, the council's chief executive also resigned after similar allegations emerged over the procurement of bids for a different development contract.

== Political control ==
The council has been under no overall control since 2003, in which time various coalitions and minority administrations have operated. Following the last election in 2022, the council was led by a Conservative minority administration which took office with support from two independent councillors and abstentions from Labour.

Following the resignation of the former Conservative leader in May 2025, independent councillor Brian Connolly was subsequently appointed as the new leader of the council at a meeting on 20 May 2025. He appointed a cabinet comprising independent councillors, Conservatives, and the Alba councillor.

The first election to South Ayrshire Council was held in 1995, initially operating as a shadow authority alongside the outgoing authorities until the new system came into force on 1 April 1996. Political control of the council since 1996 has been as follows:

Party in control	Years
Labour	1996–2003
No overall control	2003–

=== Leadership ===
The council's civic head takes the title of provost. This is a largely ceremonial role, chairing council meetings and acting as the area's first citizen. Although an elected councillor, the provost is expected to be politically impartial. Political leadership is provided by the leader of the council.

The leaders of the council since 1996 have been:

Councillor	Party	From	To
Ian Welsh	Labour	1 Apr 1996	May 1999
John Baillie	Labour	20 May 1999	Jun 2000
Andy Hill	Labour	22 Jun 2000	28 Nov 2005
Gibson MacDonald	Conservative	Dec 2005	May 2007
Hugh Hunter	Conservative	2007	Jan 2010
Bill McIntosh	Conservative	3 Feb 2010	May 2017
Douglas Campbell	SNP	18 May 2017	Jun 2020
Peter Henderson	SNP	25 Jun 2020	May 2022
Martin Dowey	Conservative	19 May 2022	1 May 2025
Brian Connolly	Independent	20 May 2025	

=== Composition ===
Following the 2022 election and subsequent by-elections and changes of allegiance up to October 2026, the composition of the council was:

Party	Seats
Conservative	5
Labour	5
SNP	5
Independent	13
Total	28

The next election is due in 2027.

== Elections ==
Since 2007 elections have been held every five years under the single transferable vote system, introduced by the Local Governance (Scotland) Act 2004. Election results since 1995 have been as follows:

Year	Seats	Conservative	SNP	Labour	Independent / Other	Notes
1995	25	4	0	21	0	Labour majority
1999	30	13	0	17	0	New ward boundaries. Labour majority
2003	30	15	0	15	0	
2007	30	12	8	9	1	New ward boundaries.
2012	30	10	9	9	2	
2017	28	12	9	5	2	New ward boundaries.
2022	28	10	9	5	4	

== Premises ==
The council is based at County Buildings on Wellington Square in Ayr, which had been built in 1931 as the headquarters for the old Ayrshire County Council, being an extension to the older Sheriff Court built in 1818. When South Ayrshire Council was created in 1996 it inherited the former Kyle and Carrick District Council's offices at Burns House on Burns Statue Square in Ayr as well as County Buildings, the latter having been used between 1975 and 1996 as an area office for Strathclyde Regional Council. In 2019 the council consolidated its offices into County Buildings. Burns House was subsequently demolished in 2021, creating a new open space, landscaped with funding from the Scottish Government.

== Wards ==
Map of the 2017 wards and election outcome

Since 2017 the area has been divided into eight wards, all electing either three or four councillors:

Ward Number	Ward Name	Location	Seats
1	Troon		4
2	Prestwick		4
3	Ayr North		4
4	Ayr East		3
5	Ayr West		4
6	Kyle		3
7	Maybole, North Carrick and Coylton		3
8	Girvan and South Carrick		3

== See also ==
- Local government in Scotland
