= Ayr (UK Parliament constituency) =

Parliamentary constituency in the United Kingdom, 1950–2005

- Former county constituency for the House of Commons
- Boundary of Ayr in Scotland for the 1997 general election
- Subdivision: Ayrshire

1950–2005
- Seats: One
- Created from: Ayr District of Burghs; Kilmarnock; South Ayrshire
- Replaced by: Ayr, Carrick & Cumnock; Central Ayrshire

Ayr was a county constituency of the House of Commons of the Parliament of the United Kingdom from 1950 to 2005. It elected one Member of Parliament (MP) by the first-past-the-post system of election.

== Boundaries ==
The constituency was created by merging the Ayr burgh and Prestwick burgh components of the Ayr District of Burghs constituency with parts of the South Ayrshire and Kilmarnock constituencies.

1950 to 1974: The civil parishes of Ayr, Prestwick, Tarbolton and Symington.

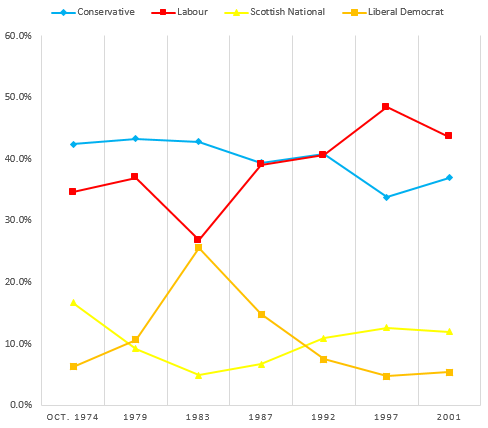
Chart of Ayr election results since October 1974.

1974 to 1983: The civil parishes of Ayr (except rural area around Ayr Hospital), Prestwick, Tarbolton and Symington.

1983 to 1997: The towns of Ayr (except the council estate of Kincaidston), Prestwick and Troon plus the villages of Dundonald, Loans, Monkton, Tarbolton and Symington.

1997 to 2005: The 1995 South Ayrshire electoral wards of Dundonald; East Kyle; Fort; Lochside and Craigie; Heathfield; Kingscase; Newton; Seafield; St Cuthbert's; St Nicholas; Troon Central; Troon East; Troon West; Wallacetown and Whitletts, covering Dundonald, Loans, Monkton, Prestwick, Symington, Tarbolton, Troon and the north and west of Ayr. This change led to a substantial alteration in the demographic of the constituency with the Labour Party being the prime beneficiaries.

2005 onwards: In 2005 the constituency was divided between the Central Ayrshire and Ayr, Carrick and Cumnock constituencies. This had a significant impact on the Conservative party by dividing their support in Ayr, Prestwick and Troon into two separate, predominantly Labour-voting constituencies, neither of which attained any considerable level of support for the Conservatives to match that of the Labour party. The town of Ayr joined two-thirds of the former Carrick, Cumnock and Doon Valley constituency to form Ayr, Carrick and Cumnock, with the remaining portion of the former Ayr constituency (based in Prestwick, Troon, Dundonald and Loans) joining Irvine, Annbank, Auchincruive, east Kilwinning and the remainder of Kyle to form Central Ayrshire.

At the 2017 general election Conservative candidate Bill Grant gained the Ayr, Carrick and Cumnock constituency with a 2,774 vote majority over the SNP's Corri Wilson.

At the Scottish Parliament the Ayr constituency has existed since the creation of the Scottish Parliament in 1999. The constituency retained the same boundaries as that of the former Ayr constituency at Westminster (1997–2005) until the 2011 First Periodic Review of Scottish Parliament Boundaries. The constituency is currently composed of the electoral wards of Ayr West, Ayr East, Ayr North, Prestwick and Troon, covering the towns of Ayr, Prestwick and Troon. The constituency had been represented by Conservative MSP John Scott since a by-election in 2000, until 2021 when the SNP won for the first time.

== Members of Parliament ==
Election	Member	Party	Notes
1950	constituency created, see Ayr Burghs and South Ayrshire		
1950	Sir Thomas Moore, Bt.	Conservative	Previously MP for Ayr Burghs
1964	George Younger	Conservative	Later Viscount Younger of Leckie; Cabinet minister 1979–1989
1992	Phil Gallie	Conservative	Later an MSP for South of Scotland 1999–2007
1997	Sandra Osborne	Labour	First female MP to represent Ayr; Subsequently, MP for Ayr, Carrick and Cumnock
2005	constituency abolished, see Ayr, Carrick and Cumnock and Central Ayrshire		

== Election results ==
=== Elections in the 1950s ===
General election 1950: Ayr
Party	Candidate	Votes	%	±%
Unionist	Thomas Moore	21,094	58.64	
Labour	John Pollock	14,880	41.36	
Majority		6,214	17.28	
Turnout		35,974		
Unionist win (new seat)				

General election 1951: Ayr
Party	Candidate	Votes	%	±%
Unionist	Thomas Moore	21,985	58.34	
Labour	Jenny Auld	15,702	41.66	
Majority		6,283	16.68	
Turnout		37,687		
Unionist hold		Swing		

General election 1955: Ayr
Party	Candidate	Votes	%	±%
Unionist	Thomas Moore	20,006	59.06	
Labour	Jenny Auld	13,866	40.94	
Majority		6,140	18.12	
Turnout		33,872		
Unionist hold		Swing		

General election 1959: Ayr
Party	Candidate	Votes	%	±%
Unionist	Thomas Moore	19,659	54.67	
Labour	Alex Eadie	16,303	45.33	
Majority		3,356	9.34	
Turnout		35,962		
Unionist hold		Swing		

=== Elections in the 1960s ===
General election 1964: Ayr
Party	Candidate	Votes	%	±%
Unionist	George Younger	20,047	52.22	
Labour	Alex Eadie	18,346	47.78	
Majority		1,701	4.44	
Turnout		38,393		
Unionist hold		Swing		

General election 1966: Ayr
Party	Candidate	Votes	%	±%
Conservative	George Younger	19,988	50.61	
Labour	Charles E O'Halloran	19,504	49.39	
Majority		484	1.22	
Turnout		39,492		
Conservative hold		Swing		

=== Elections in the 1970s ===
General election 1970: Ayr
Party	Candidate	Votes	%	±%
Conservative	George Younger	22,220	52.68	
Labour Co-op	James Craigen	17,770	42.13	
SNP	Leslie Anderson	2,186	5.18	New
Majority		4,450	10.55	
Turnout		42,176	81.46	
Conservative hold		Swing		

General election February 1974: Ayr
Party	Candidate	Votes	%	±%
Conservative	George Younger	21,626	50.46	
Labour	JA McFadden	16,528	38.56	
SNP	CD Calman	4,706	10.98	
Majority		5,098	11.90	
Turnout		41,268	83.15	
Conservative hold		Swing		

General election October 1974: Ayr
Party	Candidate	Votes	%	±%
Conservative	George Younger	17,487	42.4	−8.1
Labour Co-op	Robin S. Stewart	14,268	34.6	−4.0
SNP	Elizabeth Ann Robinson	6,902	16.7	+5.7
Liberal	Neil Murray Tosh	2,611	6.3	New
Majority		3,219	7.8	−4.1
Turnout		41,268	79.4	−3.7
Conservative hold		Swing		

General election 1979: Ayr
Party	Candidate	Votes	%	±%
Conservative	George Younger	18,907	43.3	+0.9
Labour	Keith McDonald	16,139	37.0	+2.4
Liberal	Richard McDougal Mabon	4,656	10.7	+4.4
SNP	John McGill	3,998	9.2	−7.5
Majority		2,768	6.3	−1.5
Turnout		43,700	79.8	+0.4
Conservative hold		Swing	−0.8	

=== Elections in the 1980s ===
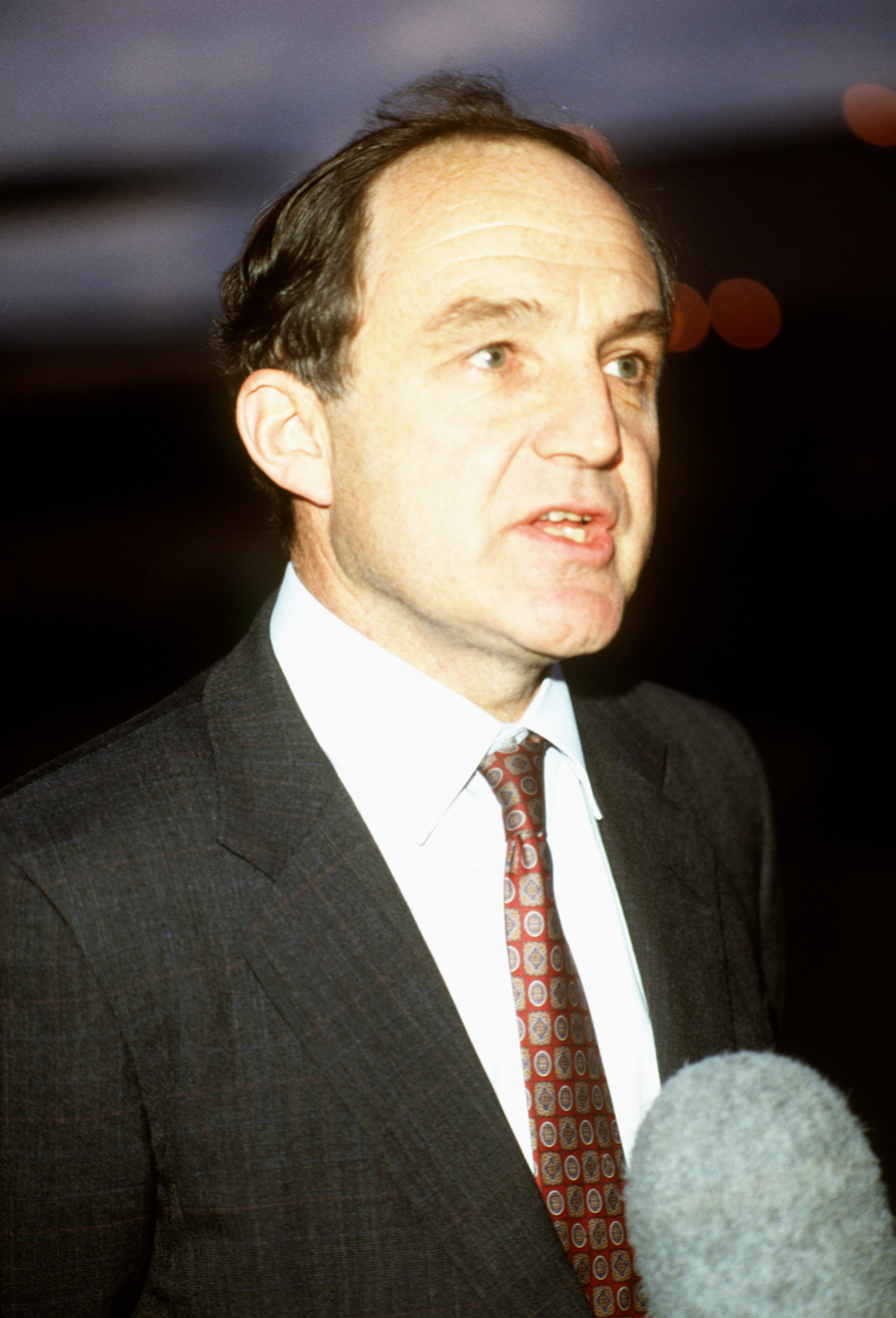
George Younger

General election 1983: Ayr
Party	Candidate	Votes	%	±%
Conservative	George Younger	21,325	42.8	−2.2
Labour	Keith McDonald	13,338	26.8	−9.7
Liberal	Chic Brodie	12,740	25.6	+14.9
SNP	Ian Goldie	2,431	4.9	−2.9
Majority		7,987	16.0	+9.7
Turnout		49,834	76.7	−3.1
Conservative hold		Swing		

In 1987 Ayr became the most marginal Westminster constituency in Scotland and the fourth most marginal constituency in the United Kingdom, being won by Conservative George Younger by 182 votes.

General election 1987: Ayr
Party	Candidate	Votes	%	±%
Conservative	George Younger	20,942	39.4	−3.4
Labour	Keith McDonald	20,760	39.1	+12.3
Liberal	Keith Moody	7,859	14.8	−10.8
SNP	Colin Weir	3,548	6.7	+1.8
Majority		182	0.3	−15.7
Turnout		53,109	79.9	+3.2
Conservative hold		Swing	−7.9	

=== Elections in the 1990s ===
In 1992 Ayr remained the most marginal constituency in Scotland and fourth most marginal constituency in the United Kingdom, being won by Conservative Phil Gallie with a majority of 85 votes.

General election 1992: Ayr
Party	Candidate	Votes	%	±%
Conservative	Phil Gallie	22,172	40.8	+1.4
Labour	Alastair Osborne	22,087	40.6	+1.5
SNP	Barbara Mullin	5,949	10.9	+4.2
Liberal Democrats	John Boss	4,067	7.5	−7.3
Natural Law	Richard B. Scott	132	0.2	New
Majority		85	0.2	−0.1
Turnout		54,407	83.0	+3.1
Conservative hold		Swing	−0.05	

In 1997 the boundaries of the Ayr seat were altered. Below is the notional result from the 1992 general election using the 1997 boundaries.

General election 1992: Ayr Notional
Party	Candidate	Votes	%	±%
Labour		19,312	42.6	+2.0
Conservative		17,417	38.4	−2.4
SNP		5,057	11.2	+0.3
Liberal Democrats		3,382	7.5	0.0
Natural Law		132	0.2	0.0
Majority		1,895	4.2	N/A
Labour gain from Conservative		Swing		

General election 1997: Ayr
Party	Candidate	Votes	%	±%
Labour	Sandra Osborne	21,679	48.4	+5.8
Conservative	Phil Gallie	15,136	33.8	−4.6
SNP	Ian Blackford	5,625	12.6	+1.4
Liberal Democrats	Clare Hamblen	2,116	4.7	−2.8
Referendum	John Enos	200	0.4	New
Majority		6,543	14.6	N/A
Turnout		44,756	80.0	−3.0
Labour gain from Conservative		Swing	+5.2	

=== Elections in the 2000s ===
General election 2001: Ayr
Party	Candidate	Votes	%	±%
Labour	Sandra Osborne	16,801	43.6	−4.8
Conservative	Phil Gallie	14,256	37.0	+3.2
SNP	Jim Mather	4,621	12.0	−0.6
Liberal Democrats	Stuart Richie	2,089	5.4	+0.7
Scottish Socialist	James Stewart	692	1.8	New
UKIP	Joseph Smith	101	0.3	New
Majority		2,545	6.6	−8.0
Turnout		38,560	69.3	−10.7
Labour hold		Swing	−4.1	
