= Ayr, Carrick and Cumnock =

UK Parliament constituency (since 2005)

Coordinates: 55.301°N 4.618°W

- County constituency for the House of Commons
- Interactive map of current boundaries
- Boundary of Ayr, Carrick and Cumnock in Scotland
- Subdivision: East Ayrshire, South Ayrshire
- Population: 93,308 (2011 census)
- Electorate: 72,057 (March 2020)
- Major settlements: Ayr, Girvan, Maybole, Cumnock, New Cumnock

Current constituency
- Created: 2005
- Member of Parliament: Elaine Stewart (Labour)
- Created from: Ayr, Carrick, Cumnock & Doon Valley

Overlaps
- Scottish Parliament: Ayr, Carrick, Cumnock & Doon Valley, South Scotland

Ayr, Carrick and Cumnock is a county constituency represented in the House of Commons of the Parliament of the United Kingdom. It was created for the 2005 general election from parts of the old Ayr and Carrick, Cumnock and Doon Valley constituencies. It has been represented since 2024 by Elaine Stewart of Scottish Labour.

== Boundaries ==
Under the Fifth Review of UK Parliament constituencies, the constituency contained parts of the East Ayrshire and South Ayrshire Councils; the boundaries were defined in accordance with the ward structure in place on 30 November 2004. Under the 2023 review of Westminster constituencies, which came into effect for the 2024 general election, the boundaries were unchanged.

Further to reviews of local government ward boundaries which came into effect in 2007 and 2017, but did not affect the parliamentary boundaries, the contents of the constituency are now defined as follows:

- In full: the East Ayrshire Council ward of Doon Valley; and the South Ayrshire Council wards of Ayr East, Ayr West, and Girvan and South Carrick.
- In part: the East Ayrshire Council ward of Cumnock and New Cumnock (virtually all); and the South Ayrshire wards of Ayr North (except the Woodfield area of Ayr), and Maybole, North Carrick and Coylton (virtually all).

The constituency covers approximately three-fifths of the South Ayrshire council area and one-fifth of the East Ayrshire council area. The remaining portion of the South Ayrshire council area is covered by the Central Ayrshire constituency and the remainder of East Ayrshire is covered as part of Kilmarnock and Loudoun.

== Constituency profile ==
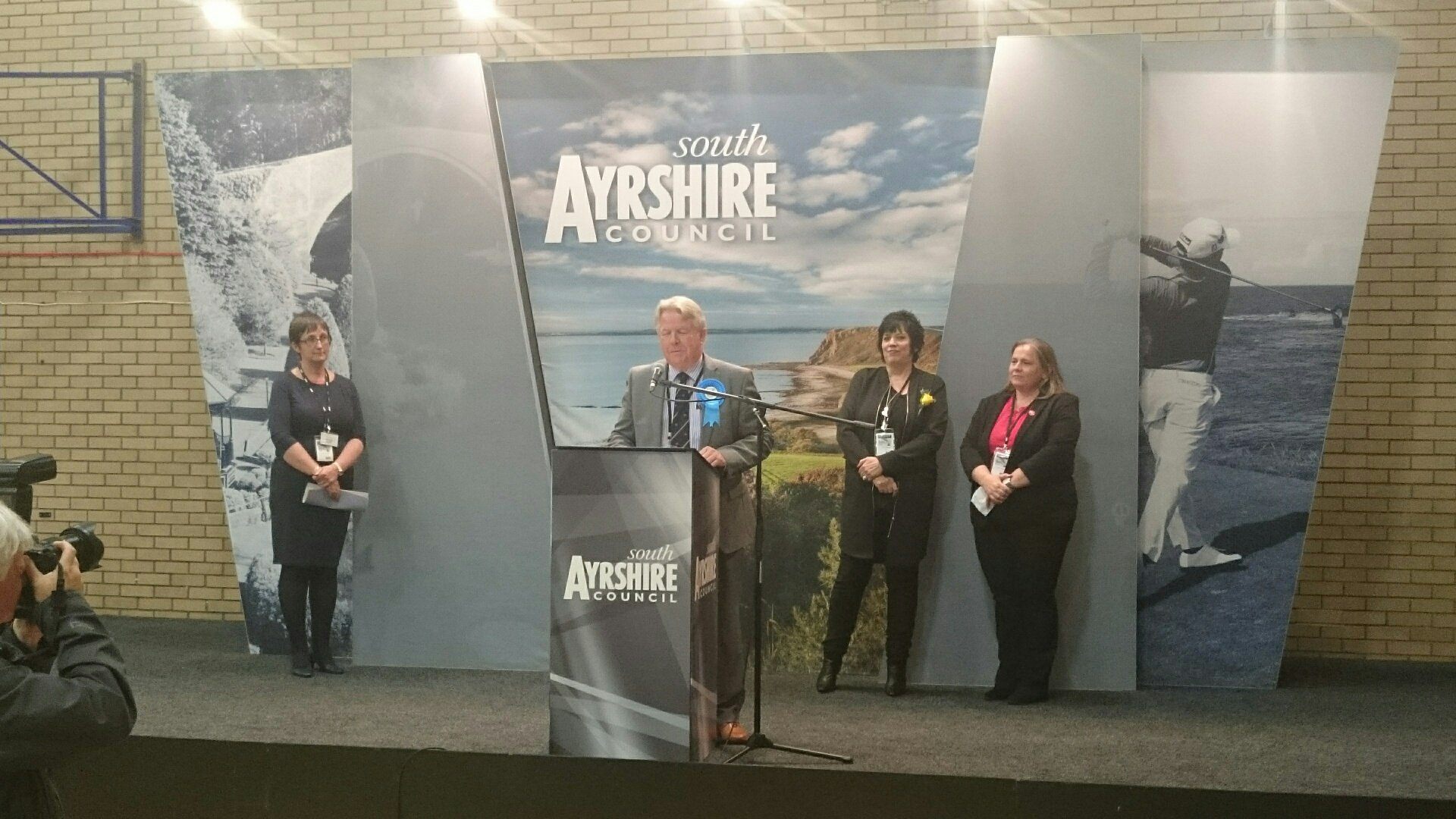
2017 declaration

=== Demographics ===
The 2011 UK Census revealed that the Ayr, Carrick and Cumnock constituency had an above-average unemployment rate at 5.6% compared to the Scottish average of 4.8%, with a significant proportion of residents living in local authority housing at 20.2% compared to the Scottish average of 13.2%. The constituency also had a high proportion of retired people and Church of Scotland Protestants at the Census relative to elsewhere in Scotland, with 19% of those living in the constituency retired (14.9% across Scotland) and 43.3% of constituents recognising their religion as Church of Scotland (32.4% across Scotland). 90% of residents identified their ethnicity as White British, with 99% recognising their ethnicity as White. On indicators such as health, educational attainment, income and social class however the area is more deprived than the national average.

=== Constituency ===
Ayr is a large resort town located to the north-west of the constituency. It consists of a mixture of working class ex-council estate areas and very affluent suburban areas. From the end of the Second World War until the 2010s, the town was marginally contested between the Labour Party and the Conservative Party, though Labour did not win the seat until 1997. The SNP supplanted the Labour Party during the 2010s and their support is strongest in the more industrialised north of the town. The Conservatives perform best in the suburbs in the south of the town, in areas such as Alloway, Doonfoot and Seafield.

To the south-west of the constituency is the rural region of Carrick, running down the Ayrshire coast between Ayr and Galloway which includes many towns and villages such as Maybole, and the resort towns of Turnberry and Girvan. The area was marginally contested between the Labour Party and the Conservative Party until the 2010s, from which point onwards the area has been contested between the Conservatives and the SNP. The Conservative Party tend to perform stronger in rural outlying villages and wealthier suburban areas, with the SNP performing stronger in Maybole.

Further east, the constituency stretches into the south of the East Ayrshire Council area to cover a set of former mining communities around Cumnock and Doon Valley - it's an area which has traditionally returned a much stronger vote for the Labour Party and weaker Conservative vote in comparison to elsewhere in the Ayr, Carrick and Cumnock. This part of the constituency contains many towns and villages such as Patna, Dalmellington, Bellsbank, and Cumnock which are deprived former mining areas which traditionally returned a very strong vote for the Labour party.

=== Voting patterns ===
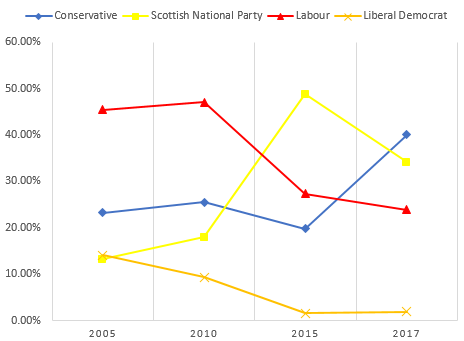
Chart of Ayr, Carrick and Cumnock elections since the 2005 general election.

==== UK Parliament ====
In 2005, approximately two-thirds of the former Carrick, Cumnock and Doon Valley constituency was attached to half of the former marginal seat of Ayr to form the Ayr, Carrick and Cumnock constituency. Carrick, Cumnock and Doon Valley had been represented in the UK Parliament by the Labour Party since the 1935 general election, whilst Ayr was represented by the Conservative Party from the 1906 general election until Labour gained the seat during their 1997 landslide electoral victory, from which point onwards the constituency was represented by Labour, with the Conservatives coming in a close second place.

The newly formed Ayr, Carrick and Cumnock constituency was won by Labour's Sandra Osborne at the 2005 general election with a majority of 9,997 votes (22.2%) ahead of the Conservatives. This was reduced slightly to 9,911 votes (21.6%) in 2010, before the constituency fell to the SNP at the 2015 SNP landslide, with SNP candidate Corri Wilson overturning incumbent Labour MP Sandra Osborne's 13,356 vote lead over the SNP (29.1%), securing the constituency with a majority of 11,265 votes (21.6%). Bill Grant of the Conservatives gained the seat at the 2017 snap general election with a majority of 2,774 votes (6.0%) over Corri Wilson of the SNP. In the 2019 General Election, Allan Dorans of the SNP gained the seat from the Conservatives with a majority of 2,329 votes (5.0%). Labour came from a poor third place in 2019 to regain the seat at the 2024 general election, with Elaine Stewart being elected with a majority of 10.1% over the SNP.

==== Scottish Parliament ====
The constituency overlaps the Scottish Parliamentary constituencies of Ayr and Carrick, Cumnock and Doon Valley.

Since the 2021 Scottish Parliament election, Ayr's Member of the Scottish Parliament (MSP) has been Siobhian Brown of the SNP. Her predecessor was the Conservative John Scott, who held the Ayr seat for 21 years.

Carrick, Cumnock and Doon Valley has been represented by the SNP since the 2011 Scottish Parliamentary election. The current MSP for Carrick, Cumnock and Doon Valley is Elena Whitham.

==== Local Council elections ====
The Conservatives have been the largest party on South Ayrshire Council since 2003, taking control of the Council in 2006. The Ayr West ward has traditionally been the strongest part of the Council for the Conservative party, with Ayr East also returning a considerable Conservative vote. More recently, the party have also gained votes in the more rural area of Carrick to the south of Ayr, with the SNP forming the largest party in the Ayr North ward.

The SNP have formed the largest party on East Ayrshire Council since 2012, however, Labour remain the largest party in Cumnock and Doon Valley, the part of East Ayrshire covered by the Ayr, Carrick and Cumnock parliamentary constituency.

In the 2022 council elections, the SNP placed first in Ayr North and Ayr East. Labour were the largest party in Cumnock and Doon Valley, and the Conservatives formed the largest party in Carrick, Coylton and Ayr West.

== Members of Parliament ==
Election	Member	Party
2005	Sandra Osborne	Labour
2015	Corri Wilson	SNP
2017	Bill Grant	Conservative
2019	Allan Dorans	SNP
2024	Elaine Stewart	Labour

== Election results ==
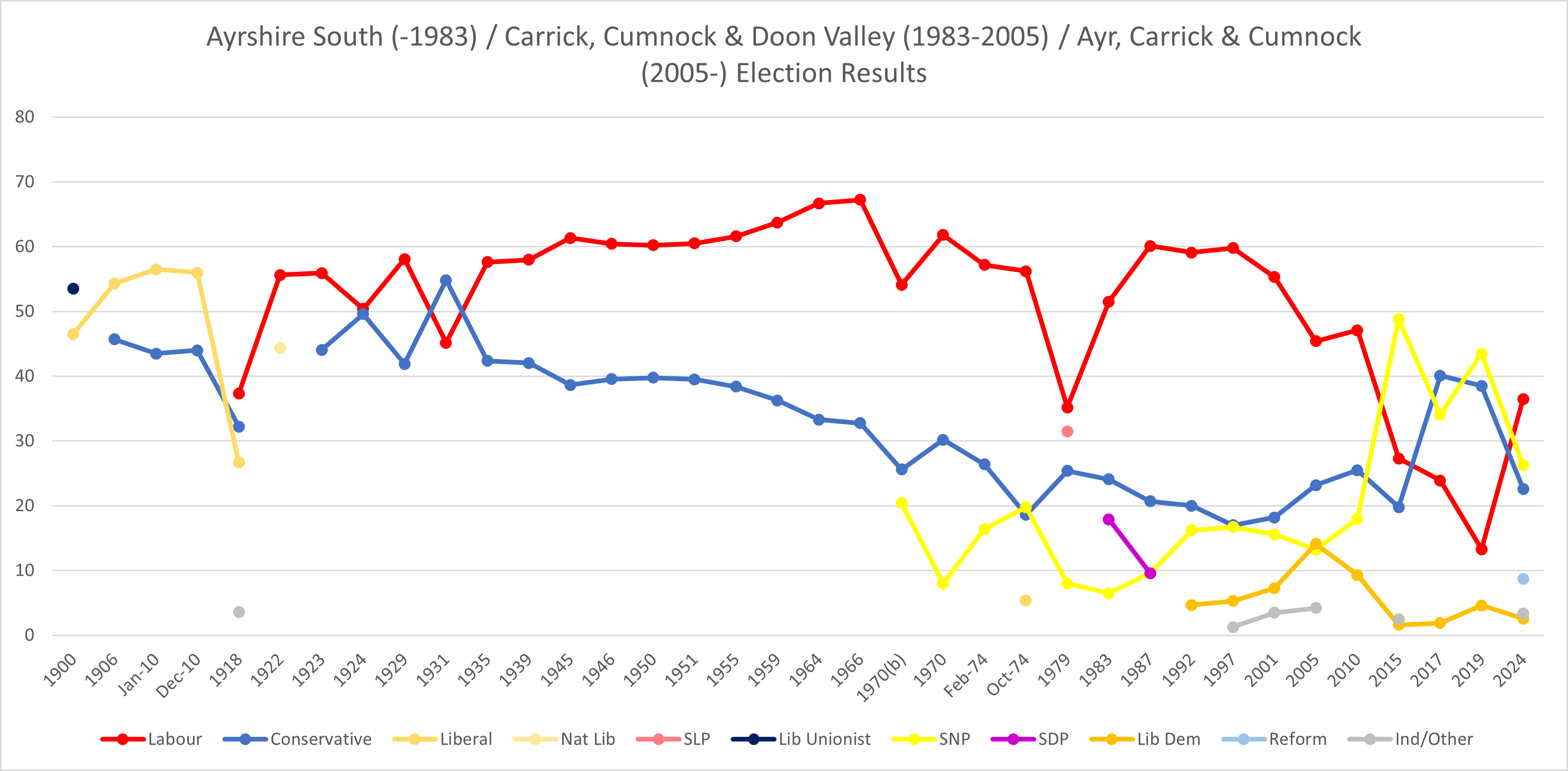
Ayrshire South (1900–1983) / Carrick, Cumnock & Doon Valley (1983–2005) / Ayr, Carrick & Cumnock (2005–) Election Results

=== Elections in the 2020s ===
2024 general election: Ayr, Carrick and Cumnock
Party	Candidate	Votes	%	±%
Labour	Elaine Stewart	14,930	36.5	+23.2
SNP	Allan Dorans	10,776	26.3	−17.2
Conservative	Martin Dowey	9,247	22.6	−15.9
Reform	Andrew Russell	3,544	8.7	New
Liberal Democrats	Paul Kennedy	1,081	2.6	−2.0
Green	Korin Vallance	886	2.2	New
Alba	Corri Wilson	472	1.2	New
Majority		4,154	10.1	N/A
Turnout		40,936	58.2	−6.5
Registered electors		70,340		
Labour gain from SNP		Swing	+20.2	

=== Elections in the 2010s ===
2019 general election: Ayr, Carrick and Cumnock
Party	Candidate	Votes	%	±%
SNP	Allan Dorans	20,272	43.5	+9.4
Conservative	Martin Dowey	17,943	38.5	−1.6
Labour	Duncan Townson	6,219	13.3	−10.6
Liberal Democrats	Helena Bongard	2,158	4.6	+2.7
Majority		2,329	5.0	N/A
Turnout		46,592	64.7	−0.2
SNP gain from Conservative		Swing	+5.5	

2017 general election: Ayr, Carrick and Cumnock
Party	Candidate	Votes	%	±%
Conservative	Bill Grant	18,550	40.1	+20.3
SNP	Corri Wilson	15,776	34.1	−14.7
Labour	Carol Mochan	11,024	23.9	−3.4
Liberal Democrats	Callum Leslie	872	1.9	+0.3
Majority		2,774	6.0	N/A
Turnout		46,296	64.9	−6.6
Conservative gain from SNP		Swing		

2015 general election: Ayr, Carrick and Cumnock
Party	Candidate	Votes	%	±%
SNP	Corri Wilson	25,492	48.8	+30.8
Labour	Sandra Osborne	14,227	27.3	−19.8
Conservative	Lee Lyons	10,355	19.8	−5.7
UKIP	Joseph Adam-Smith	1,280	2.5	New
Liberal Democrats	Richard Brodie	855	1.6	−7.7
Majority		11,265	21.5	N/A
Turnout		52,209	71.5	+8.9
SNP gain from Labour		Swing	+25.4	

2010 general election: Ayr, Carrick and Cumnock
Party	Candidate	Votes	%	±%
Labour	Sandra Osborne	21,632	47.1	+1.7
Conservative	Bill Grant	11,721	25.5	+2.3
SNP	Chic Brodie	8,276	18.0	+4.8
Liberal Democrats	James Taylor	4,264	9.3	−4.8
Majority		9,911	21.6	−0.6
Turnout		45,893	62.6	+1.3
Labour hold		Swing	−0.3	

=== Elections in the 2000s ===
2005 general election: Ayr, Carrick and Cumnock
Party	Candidate	Votes	%	±%
Labour	Sandra Osborne	20,433	45.4	−5.9
Conservative	Mark Jones	10,436	23.2	−1.6
Liberal Democrats	Colin Waugh	6,341	14.1	+6.9
SNP	Chic Brodie	5,932	13.2	−0.5
Scottish Senior Citizens	Donald Sharp	592	1.3	New
Scottish Socialist	Murray Steele	554	1.2	−1.2
Socialist Labour	James McDaid	395	0.9	+0.3
UKIP	Bryan McCormack	365	0.8	+0.7
Majority		9,997	22.2	−4.3
Turnout		45,048	61.3	
Labour win (new seat)				
