= Ayr North (ward) =

Electoral ward in South Ayrshire, Scotland

- South Ayrshire
- Boundary of Ayr North in South Ayrshire from 2017.
- Population: 17,055 (2021)
- Electorate: 12,973 (2022)
- Major settlements: Ayr (part of)
- Scottish Parliament constituency: Ayr
- Scottish Parliament region: South Scotland
- UK Parliament constituency: Ayr, Carrick and Cumnock; Central Ayrshire

Current ward
- Created: 2007
- Number of councillors: 4
- Councillor: Laura Brennan-Whitefield (SNP)
- Councillor: Ian Cavana (Labour)
- Councillor: Ian Davis (Conservative)
- Councillor: Wullie Hogg (Independent)
- Created from: Ayr Central; Ayr Craigie; Ayr Lochside; Ayr Newton; Ayr Whitletts; Prestwick Toll

Ayr North is one of the eight electoral wards of South Ayrshire Council. Created in 2007, the ward elects four councillors using the single transferable vote electoral system and covers an area with a population of 17,055 people.

The area has been politically split between Labour and the Scottish National Party (SNP) with both parties holding half the seats at various points since the ward's creation.

== Boundaries ==
The ward was created following the Fourth Statutory Reviews of Electoral Arrangements ahead of the 2007 Scottish local elections. As a result of the Local Governance (Scotland) Act 2004, local elections in Scotland would use the single transferable vote electoral system from 2007 onwards so Ayr North was formed from an amalgamation of several previous first-past-the-post wards.

It contained all of the former Ayr Lochside, Ayr Newton and Ayr Whitletts wards, the southern half of the former Prestwick Toll ward, the majority of the former Ayr Cragie ward and the northwestern part of the former Ayr Central ward. The ward centres on the northern portion of the town of Ayr which is situated on the Firth of Clyde coast in the northwest of the council area. It contains everything in the town north of the River Ayr apart from an area around John Street, south of King Street and east of Craigie Road. The ward's boundaries were unchanged following the Fifth Statutory Reviews of Electoral Arrangements ahead of the 2017 Scottish local elections.

== Councillors ==
Year	Councillors			
2007	Douglas Campbell (Labour/ Independent/ SNP)	Tom Slider (SNP)	John Hampton (Conservative)	Ian Cavana (Labour)
2008	Douglas Campbell (Labour/ Independent/ SNP)	Tom Slider (SNP)	John Hampton (Conservative)	Ian Cavana (Labour)
2011	Douglas Campbell (Labour/ Independent/ SNP)	Tom Slider (SNP)	John Hampton (Conservative)	Ian Cavana (Labour)
2012	Douglas Campbell (Labour/ Independent/ SNP)	Rita Miller (Labour)	John Hampton (Conservative)	Ian Cavana (Labour)
2017	Douglas Campbell (Labour/ Independent/ SNP)	Laura Brennan-Whitefield (SNP)	Ian Davis (Conservative)	Ian Cavana (Labour)
2022	Mark Dixon (SNP)	Laura Brennan-Whitefield (SNP)	Ian Davis (Conservative)	Ian Cavana (Labour)
2025	Wullie Hogg (Independent)	Laura Brennan-Whitefield (SNP)	Ian Davis (Conservative)	Ian Cavana (Labour)

== Election results ==
=== 2025 by-election ===
Ayr North by-election (16 October 2025) - 1 seat
Party	Candidate	FPv%	Count							
Party	Candidate	FPv%	1	2	3	4	5	6	7	8
Independent	Wullie Hogg	25.1	850	864	871	924	952	1,138	1,325	1,699
SNP	Ian Douglas	23.3	790	802	818	835	847	898	1,075	
Labour	John Duncan	20.4	691	696	713	738	775	830		
Reform UK	Andrew Russell	17.2	584	584	589	607	642			
Conservative	David Paterson	5.7	195	196	199	211				
Independent	David Petrie	4.5	151	157	160					
Liberal Democrats	Mason Graham	2.1	73	74						
Independent	Orhan Bulikj	1.5	51							
Electorate: 12,653 Valid: 3,385 Spoilt: 37 Quota: 1,693 Turnout: 27%

=== 2022 election ===
Ayr North - 4 seats
Party	Candidate	FPv%	Count						
Party	Candidate	FPv%	1	2	3	4	5	6	7
SNP	Laura Brennan-Whitefield (incumbent)	38.8	1,913						
Labour	Ian Cavana (incumbent)	24.0	1,185						
Conservative	Ian Davis (incumbent)	13.7	675	687	715	719	723	745	1,046
SNP	Mark Dixon	6.9	344	1,143					
Conservative	David Paterson	6.8	336	341	349	352	354	367	
Independent	Andrew Russell	6.2	309	326	346	365	403	462	481
Liberal Democrats	Mason Graham	1.6	80	90	137	156	172		
Alba	Denise Sommerville	1.6	79	90	94	124			
Electorate: 12,973 Valid: 4,921 Spoilt: 166 Quota: 985 Turnout: 39.2%

=== 2017 election ===
Ayr North - 4 seats
Party	Candidate	FPv%	Count		
Party	Candidate	FPv%	1	2	3
Conservative	Ian Davis	25.6	1,258		
SNP	Laura Brennan-Whitefield	25.5	1,256		
Labour	Ian Cavana (incumbent)	19.5	958	1,015	
SNP	Douglas Campbell (incumbent)	18.1	892	902	1,138
Independent	Jamie McGeechan	6.1	300	363	375
Labour	Brenda Knox	5.2	256	286	291
Electorate: 13,106 Valid: 4,920 Spoilt: 158 Quota: 985 Turnout: 39.6%

=== 2012 election ===
Ayr North - 4 seats
Party	Candidate	FPv%	Count				
Party	Candidate	FPv%	1	2	3	4	5
Labour	Ian Cavana (incumbent)	34.0	1,481				
SNP	Douglas Campbell (incumbent)	31.2	1,361				
Conservative	John Hampton (incumbent)	15.9	692	715	744	762	975
Labour	Rita Miller	11.9	519	1,003			
SNP	Tom Slider (incumbent)	7.0	305	332	724	751	
Electorate: 12,643 Valid: 4,358 Spoilt: 115 Quota: 872 Turnout: 34.5%

=== 2007 election ===
Ayr North – 4 seats
Party	Candidate	FPv%	Count								
Party	Candidate	FPv%	1	2	3	4	5	6	7	8	9
Labour	Douglas Campbell	27.0	1,663								
SNP	Tom Slider	25.0	1,506								
Conservative	John Hampton	18.4	1,108	1,119	1,147	1,151	1,158	1,170	1,186	???	???
Labour	Ian Cavana	11.8	712	1,004	1,040	1,041	1,046	1,056	1,074	???	???
Independent	Rab Hill	7.4	445	457	476	484	511	524	559	???	
Labour	Ian Stewart	5.9	356	412	438	440	441	450	469		
Solidarity	Amanda McFarlane	1.9	117	122	146	150	158	186			
Scottish Socialist	Liz Swan	1.1	66	70	99	102	106				
Independent	Jim McEwan	0.8	50	52	60	74					
Independent	Tommy O'Lone	0.6	37	39	46						
Valid: 6,060 Quota: 1,213
