= 2000 Ayr by-election =

2000 by-election for Scottish Parliament

- 16 March 2000

The Ayr seat in the Scottish Parliament. Elected by simple majority using first past the post. Triggered by resignation of incumbent
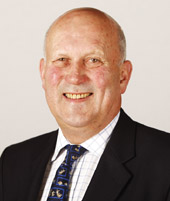

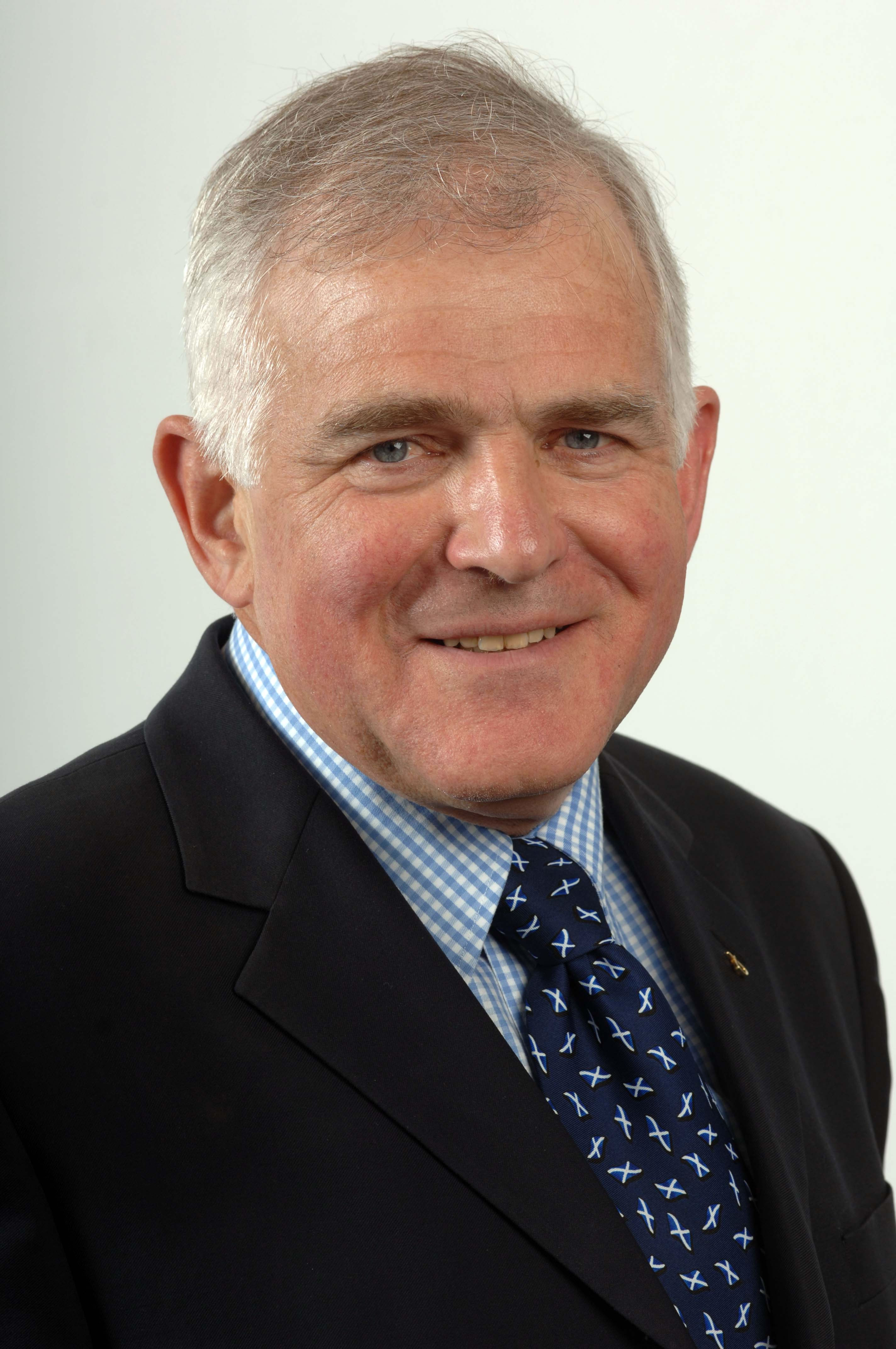

	First party	Second party	Third party
Candidate	John Scott	Jim Mather	Rita Miller
Party	Conservative	SNP	Labour
Popular vote	12,580	9,236	7,054
Percentage	39.4%	29.0%	22.1%
Swing	▲1.4%	▲9.5%	▼16.0%
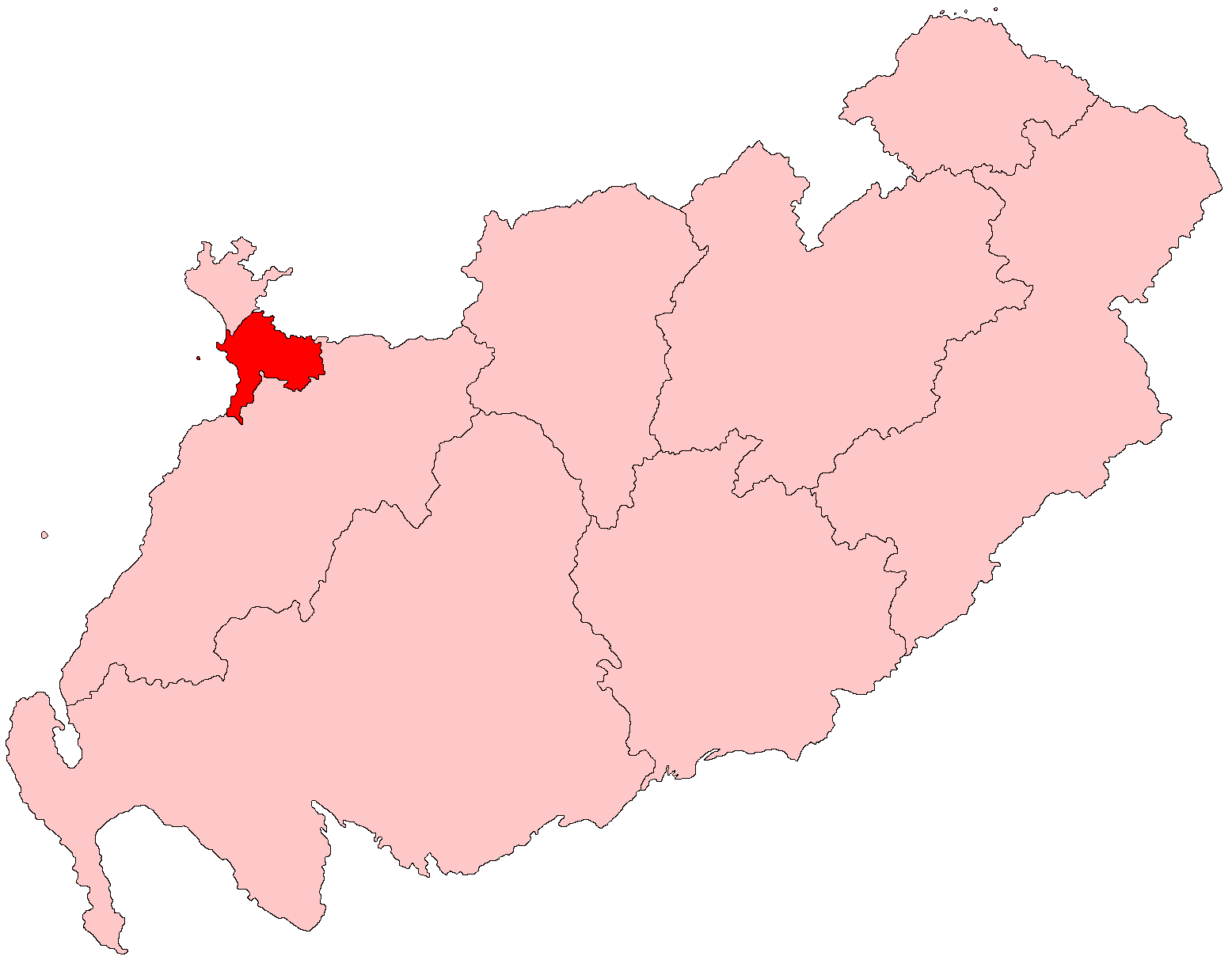
- Ayr shown within the South of Scotland electoral region.
MSP before election
Ian Welsh
Labour
Elected MSP
John Scott
Conservative

The 2000 Ayr by-election on 16 March 2000 was the first by-election for the Scottish Parliament that had been established the year previously. It was caused by the resignation of Ian Welsh who had been elected at the 1999 Scottish Parliament election. Welsh resigned to spend more time with his family.

The by-election came amidst the Keep the Clause campaign. The Scottish parliament seat of Ayr shared its boundaries with the Westminster seat, which had until 1997 been held by the Conservatives for almost a hundred years. In the 1999 Scottish parliamentary election the seat had been the most marginal in Scotland, with Labour winning over the Conservatives by a mere 25 votes. The Keep the Clause Campaign sought to influence the outcome of the election, campaigning in the area and buying up billboard space. Souter later claimed to have successfully influenced the by-election, with the by-election being won by the Conservative candidate, who had opposed repealing Section 28. Labour's George Foulkes attacked the Keep the Clause Campaign, claiming there had been a "distortion of democracy" and that the Keep the Clause Campaign had outspent all the candidates combined.

The result was a poor one for the Scottish Labour, which had won the seat in the previous year, albeit with a majority of just 25. Labour fell into third place behind the Scottish National Party (SNP) and the Scottish Conservatives. The Scottish Socialist Party had a relatively strong performance for a constituency which did not seem like its natural terrain.

This by-election showed a strange effect in the Scottish AMS electoral system. Labour in the South of Scotland region had won seven seats, all as first past the post constituencies and none on the list system through proportional representation, whilst the Conservative and Unionists had won four seats in South of Scotland through the proportional representation system. By winning the Ayr seat at the by-election the Conservatives had technically greater representation than their 1999 results would have proportionally given them. This is an anomaly that the Scotland Act 1998 does not cater to.

== Result ==
2000 Ayr by-election
Party	Candidate	Votes	%	±%
Conservative	John Scott	12,580	39.4	+1.4
SNP	Jim Mather	9,236	29.0	+9.5
Labour	Rita Miller	7,054	22.1	−16.0
Scottish Socialist	James Stewart	1,345	4.2	New
Liberal Democrats	Stuart Ritchie	800	2.5	−1.9
Green	Gavin Corbett	460	1.4	New
The Radio Vet	William Botcherby	186	0.6	New
UKIP	Alistair McConnachie	113	0.4	New
ProLife Alliance	Robert Graham	111	0.4	New
Independent	Kevin Dillion	15	0.1	New
Majority		3,344	10.4	N/A
Turnout		31,900		
Conservative gain from Labour		Swing		

== Previous result ==
1999 Ayr Scottish Parliament election
Party	Candidate	Votes	%	±%
Labour	Ian Welsh	14,263	38.1	N/A
Conservative	Phil Gallie	14,238	38.0	N/A
SNP	Roger Mullin	7,291	19.5	N/A
Liberal Democrats	Elaine Morris	1,662	4.4	N/A
Majority		25	0.1	N/A
Turnout		37,454		
Labour win (new seat)				

== See also ==
- Ayr (Scottish Parliament constituency)
- Ayr (UK Parliament constituency)
- Elections in Scotland
- List of by-elections to the Scottish Parliament
