= Ian Welsh =

Scottish politician (born 1953)

Ian Welsh OBE

Member of the Scottish Parliament for Ayr
- In office 6 May 1999 – 21 December 1999
- Preceded by: New Parliament
- Succeeded by: John Scott
- Majority: 25 (0.07%)

Personal details
- Born: 23 November 1953 (age 72) Prestwick, Ayrshire, Scotland
- Party: Scottish Labour Party
- Spouse: Elizabeth McAndrew
- Children: 2
- Education: Glasgow University
- Occupation: Charity worker

Ian McWilliam Welsh OBE (born 23 November 1953) is a former Scottish Labour politician who works as Chief Executive of the Health and Social Care Alliance Scotland. After a brief career as a professional footballer, he was an English teacher and became a local councillor, serving twice as a Council Leader. He was very narrowly elected as the Member of the Scottish Parliament (MSP) for Ayr in 1999 but resigned at the end of the year, disillusioned at his failure to achieve office and having decided that he was uncomfortable with the mode of politics.

== Teaching career ==
Welsh was born and brought up in Prestwick, Ayrshire; he attended Prestwick Academy and Ayr Academy. He was a professional football player for Kilmarnock F.C., but when his football career ended he studied English Literature and History at the University of Glasgow and obtained a Diploma in Educational Management at Jordanhill College. He was employed as an English teacher at the James Hamilton Academy in Kilmarnock in 1977. He moved on to Auchinleck Academy in 1980, and became deputy Head Teacher there in 1992.

== Local government ==
Welsh went into politics as a councillor for Prestwick ward on Kyle and Carrick District Council in 1984. From the late 1980s, chaired the Prestwick Airport Steering Group; he campaigned alongside Scottish MPs to preserve the monopoly which Prestwick then enjoyed on cross-Atlantic flights from Scotland. Welsh became council leader of Kyle and Carrick Council in 1990, holding office until Labour lost control of the council in 1992. In 1995, he was elected to South Ayrshire Council, and served as Leader of the Council until 1999. He left teaching in 1997 and after briefly working as Director of Human Resources and Public Affairs for Prestwick Airport, was appointed Chief Executive of Kilmarnock F.C.

== MSP for Ayr ==
In the first elections to the Scottish Parliament in May 1999, Welsh won the seat of Ayr by just 25 votes (0.07%) ahead of the Conservative and Unionist candidate, Phil Gallie. The seat was the most marginal of the election, and there had to be two full recounts. He was named as member of the Education, Culture and Sport committee of the Parliament. In November 1999, he cautioned the members of the committee not to intervene in delicate negotiations over funding of Hampden Park before it had a full briefing from the Minister responsible.

== Resignation ==
An assessment of the performance of each MSP by The Herald newspaper published in the middle of December 1999 noted that Welsh was only on leave of absence from being Chief Executive of Kilmarnock F.C., and said that he was "clearly finding the transition to 'humble' back bencher a bit hard". A week later, Welsh suddenly resigned his seat, explaining that the decision came after "considerable heart searching and extended family debate". After press speculation that he was disappointed not to have achieved high office, Welsh wrote an article explaining that as a council leader he delivered "real service to constituents, rather than the threadbare and raddled soundbites of politicians who promise everything and deliver nothing". At 230 days after election, he was the first MSP to resign from the job. The subsequent by-election was won by John Scott for the Conservatives, gaining the party their first ever constituency seat in the Scottish Parliament.

== Later career ==
Welsh returned to his post as Chief Executive of Kilmarnock F.C., but in July 2001 was appointed as Chief Executive of Rehab Scotland. He was Chief Executive of Momentum Scotland, a charity providing rehabilitation and training for disabled people, from 2001 to 2007. He was also Chairman of Borderline Theatre Company from 2002 to 2007, and became chairman of AUFA in 2007. He was Director of UK Services for the Rehab Group from 2007 to 2011. He is Chief Executive of the Health and Social Care Alliance Scotland.

Scottish Parliament
New parliament Scotland Act 1998	Member of the Scottish Parliament for Ayr; 6 May 1999 – 21 December 1999	Succeeded by John Scott
