= Ayr (Scottish Parliament constituency) =

Constituency of the Scottish Parliament

- Burgh constituency for the Scottish Parliament
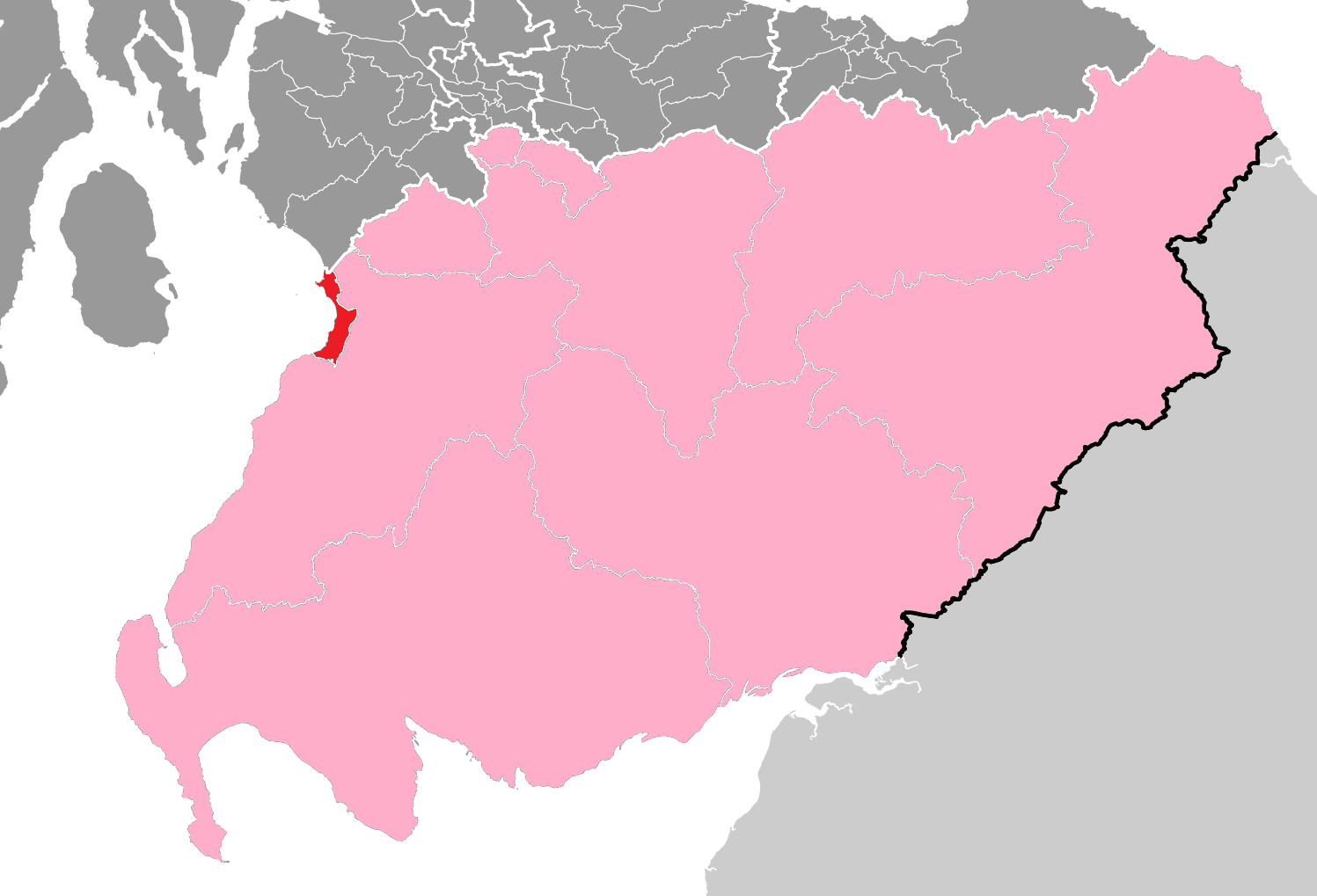

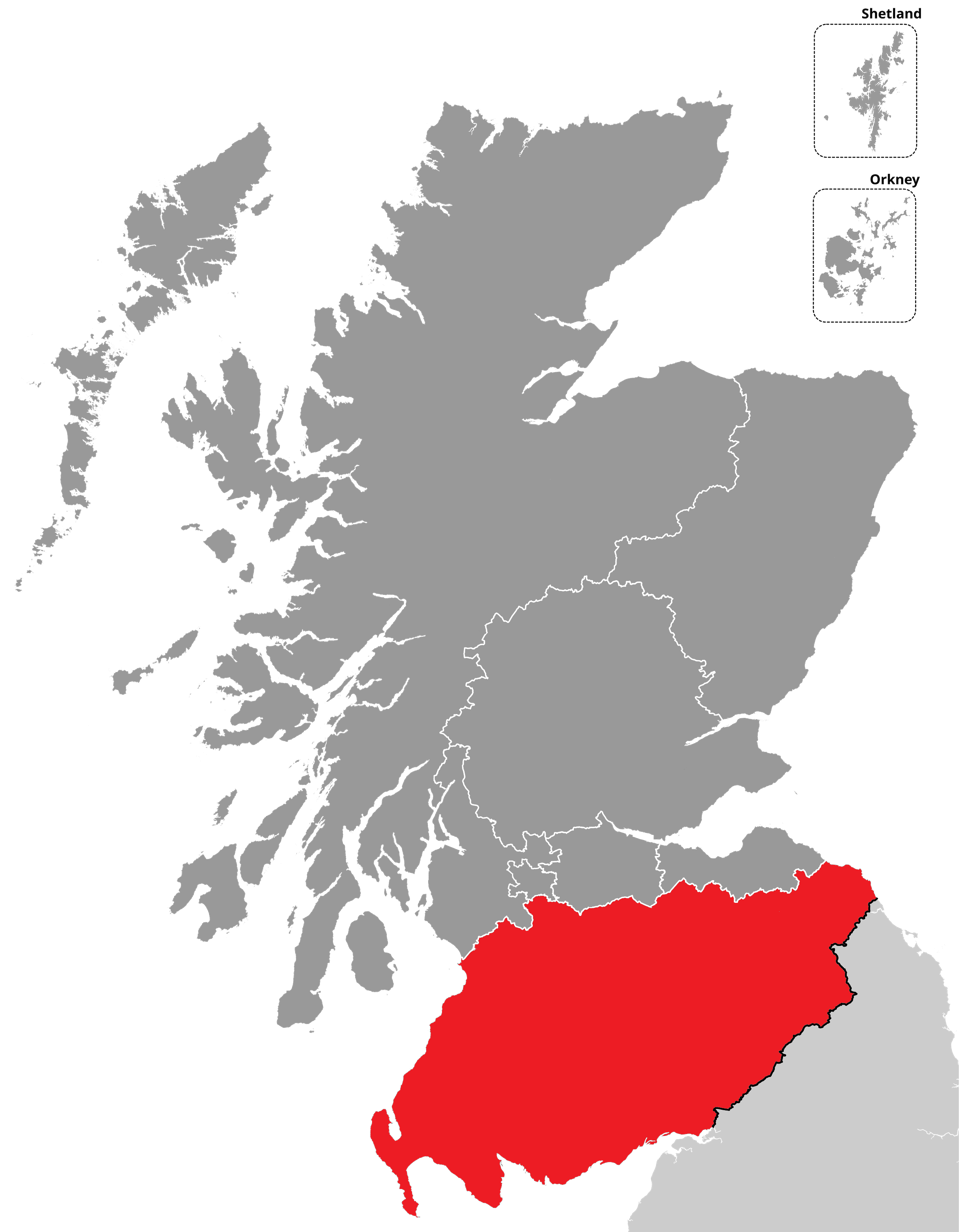
- Ayr shown within the South Scotland electoral region and the region shown within Scotland
- Electoral region: South Scotland
- Electorate: 63,001 (2026)

Current constituency
- Created: 1999
- Party: SNP
- MSP: Siobhian Brown
- Council area: South Ayrshire

Ayr (Gaelic: Inbhir Àir) is a burgh constituency of the Scottish Parliament covering the town of Ayr in the council area of South Ayrshire. It elects one Member of the Scottish Parliament (MSP) via the plurality (first past the post) electoral system. It is also one of ten constituencies in the South Scotland electoral region which elects seven additional members to the Scottish Parliament via a proportional electoral system known as the Additional Members System (abbreviated AMS) which allows for greater accuracy in representation for the region as a whole.

The seat has been held by Siobhian Brown of the Scottish National Party since the 2021 Scottish Parliament election.

== Electoral region ==
Following the second periodic review of Scottish Parliament boundaries in 2025, the other nine constituencies of the South Scotland region are: Carrick, Cumnock and Doon Valley; Clydesdale; Dumfriesshire; East Kilbride; Ettrick, Roxburgh and Berwickshire; Galloway and West Dumfries; Hamilton, Larkhall and Stonehouse; Kilmarnock and Irvine Valley; and Midlothian South, Tweeddale and Lauderdale. The region covers the whole of the council areas of Dumfries and Galloway, Scottish Borders, and South Ayrshire council areas; and parts of the council areas of East Ayrshire, Midlothian, and South Lanarkshire. By population it is now the largest of Scotland's eight electoral regions.

Prior to the 2025 review, the other eight constituencies of the South Scotland region were: Carrick, Cumnock and Doon Valley; Clydesdale; Dumfriesshire; East Lothian; Ettrick, Roxburgh and Berwickshire; Galloway and West Dumfries; Kilmarnock and Irvine Valley; and Midlothian South, Tweeddale and Lauderdale. The region covered the Dumfries and Galloway, East Ayrshire, Scottish Borders and South Ayrshire council areas in full and elements of the East Lothian, Midlothian and South Lanarkshire council areas.

== Constituency boundaries and council area ==
Wards of the Ayr Scottish Parliament constituency as of 2011

=== 1999–2011 ===
The Ayr constituency was created at the same time as the Scottish Parliament, in 1999, following the same boundaries as the existing Ayr constituency at Westminster. In 2005 however most UK Parliamentary constituencies in Scotland were replaced with new constituencies, with the Ayr constituency being abolished and replaced by the Ayr, Carrick and Cumnock and Central Ayrshire constituencies. This had no impact on the boundaries of the Ayr constituency in the Scottish Parliament which used the old Westminster boundaries during the 2007 election to the Scottish Parliament.

The constituency covered the 1995 South Ayrshire electoral wards of:

- Dundonald; East Kyle; Fort; Lochside and Craigie; Heathfield; Kingscase; Newton; Seafield; St Cuthbert's; St Nicholas; Troon Central; Troon East; Troon West; Wallacetown and Whitletts, covering Dundonald, Loans, Monkton, Prestwick, Symington, Tarbolton, Troon and the north and west of Ayr.

The remaining section of South Ayrshire was covered by the Carrick, Cumnock and Doon Valley constituency.

=== 2011–2026 ===
Following the First Periodic Review of Scottish Parliament Boundaries in time for the 2011 Scottish Parliament election, the Boundary Commission for Scotland recommended alterations to the existing Ayr constituency which were then implemented and used at the 2011, 2016 and 2021 Scottish Parliamentary elections. The Ayr constituency as defined at this review covered the towns of Ayr, Prestwick and Troon, and takes in the electoral wards of:

- Ayr East
- Ayr North
- Ayr West
- Prestwick
- Troon

All of these are wards of South Ayrshire Council. The remaining wards in South Ayrshire formed part of the Carrick, Cumnock and Doon Valley.

=== 2026-onwards ===
Following the Second Periodic Review of Scottish Parliament Boundaries ahead of the 2026 Scottish Parliament election, Boundaries Scotland recommended that the existing Ayr constituency be retained on its current borders. The remaining wards of South Ayrshire continue to form part of Carrick, Cumnock and Doon Valley, which was also unchanged by this review.

== Constituency profile and voting patterns ==
=== Constituency profile ===
Ayr is a burgh constituency of the Scottish Parliament covering the adjoining coastal towns of Ayr, Prestwick and Troon in north-west South Ayrshire. The constituency is a popular coastal resort on Scotland's west coast. The town of Ayr serves as the administrative centre of the South Ayrshire Council area and is the most populated section of the constituency. The town annually hosts the Scottish Grand National horse-racing steeplechase and the Scottish Airshow. Towards the south of the town is Robert Burns Cottage in the suburb of Alloway. In Prestwick and Troon, the exclusive Royal Troon and Prestwick Golf Clubs regularly host the British Open Championship. The seat also takes in Glasgow Prestwick International Airport.

The constituency covers a diverse and muddled mix of wealthy middle class suburbs and deprived council estates, divided between suburban housing based around parts of Prestwick, Troon and the south-west of Ayr and social housing based around the industrial north of Ayr and parts of south-east Ayr including the council estates of Kincaidston, Forehill and South Belmont.

=== Voting patterns ===
Historically the Ayr seat has held a higher level of support for the Conservative Party in comparison to elsewhere in Scotland and the United Kingdom as a whole. The equivalent Westminster constituency of Ayr was gained by the Conservative Party at its creation in 1950. In subsequent elections the seat went on to return Conservative MP's to Parliament until the 1997 UK general election, when the boundaries of the constituency were altered in a move involving the transfer of a number of Conservative-voting suburbs towards the south of Ayr to the adjoining Carrick, Cumnock and Doon Valley constituency, which subsequently altered the demographics of the Ayr constituency - benefiting the Labour Party. In spite of this, at the 1997 election, the Ayr seat returned one of the smallest pro-Labour swings in Great Britain at just over 5%. Prior to this the Ayr Burghs constituency (which incorporated a number of towns in coastal Ayrshire including Irvine, Troon, Prestwick, Ayr, Saltcoats and Ardrossan) continuously returned Conservative MP's to Parliament from 1906 until its abolishment in 1950, making Ayr the longest seat to be held continuously by the Conservatives in Scotland (continuously having a Conservative MP at Westminster for 91 years).

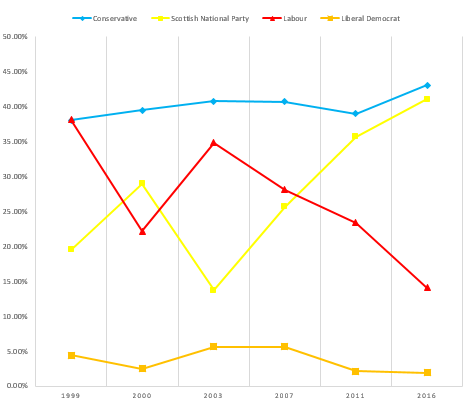
Chart of Ayr election results since 1999.

Until the late 2000s the Labour Party held a significant level of support across the Ayr constituency and were able to win the constituency by 25 votes at the 1999 Scottish Parliamentary election as a consequence of a high turnout and the constituency's boundaries, which excluded various Conservative-voting suburbs in southern Ayr (including Alloway, Doonfoot, Masonhill, Holmston and Castlehill). Labour's decline in support in the Scottish Parliament coupled with a lower turnout allowed for the Conservatives to secure the constituency comfortably at the 2000 Ayr by-election following the resignation of Ayr's first MSP, Ian Welsh. The by-election was the first by-election of the Scottish Parliament, making Ayr the first Scottish Conservative constituency seat in the Scottish Parliament (who won no constituency seats at the 1999 Scottish Parliament election). The Conservatives went on to hold the constituency at the 2003 and 2007 Scottish Parliament elections, despite marginally missing out in the Westminster seat of Ayr to the Labour Party at the 2001 UK general election.

In 2011, the constituency boundaries were altered, with the electoral ward of Kyle being transferred to the Carrick, Cumnock and Doon Valley constituency. At the same time the remaining portion of the town of Ayr covered by the Carrick, Cumnock and Doon Valley constituency was transferred over to the Ayr constituency. The Ayr constituency went on to return Conservative MSP John Scott to Parliament with a reduced majority at the 2011 and 2016 Scottish Parliament elections. At the 2017 UK general election, Conservative candidate Bill Grant gained the overlapping Westminster constituency of Ayr, Carrick and Cumnock from the SNP with a majority of 2,774 votes (6.0%), but the SNP regained it at the 2019 UK general election with a majority of over 2,000 votes. In 2021, the SNP's Siobhian Brown gained the Ayr constituency from Scott with a narrow majority of 170 votes on a record high turnout of 68%. This was the smallest majority in Scotland. Ayr became the most marginal constituency in the Scottish Parliament after the 2021 election, with the SNP winning it by just 170 votes.

In past local elections, the Conservatives have performed better in Ayr West, Troon and Prestwick, with the SNP and Labour performing better in more deprived areas within the constituency such as Ayr North and parts of Ayr East.

== Members of the Scottish Parliament ==
At the 1999 Scottish Parliament election, Labour's Ian Welsh became Ayr's first constituency MSP at Holyrood, winning the constituency with a majority of 25 votes ahead of former Ayr MP Phil Gallie. The constituency went on to elect Conservative John Scott to Parliament in a subsequent by-election held in 2000. Scott held the position of constituency MSP for Ayr until his 2021 defeat by the SNP's Siobhian Brown, who won the constituency for the first time with a majority of 170 votes.

| Election | Member | Party |
|---|---|---|
| 1999 | Ian Welsh | Labour |
| 2000 | John Scott | Conservative |
| 2021 | Siobhian Brown | SNP |

== Election results ==
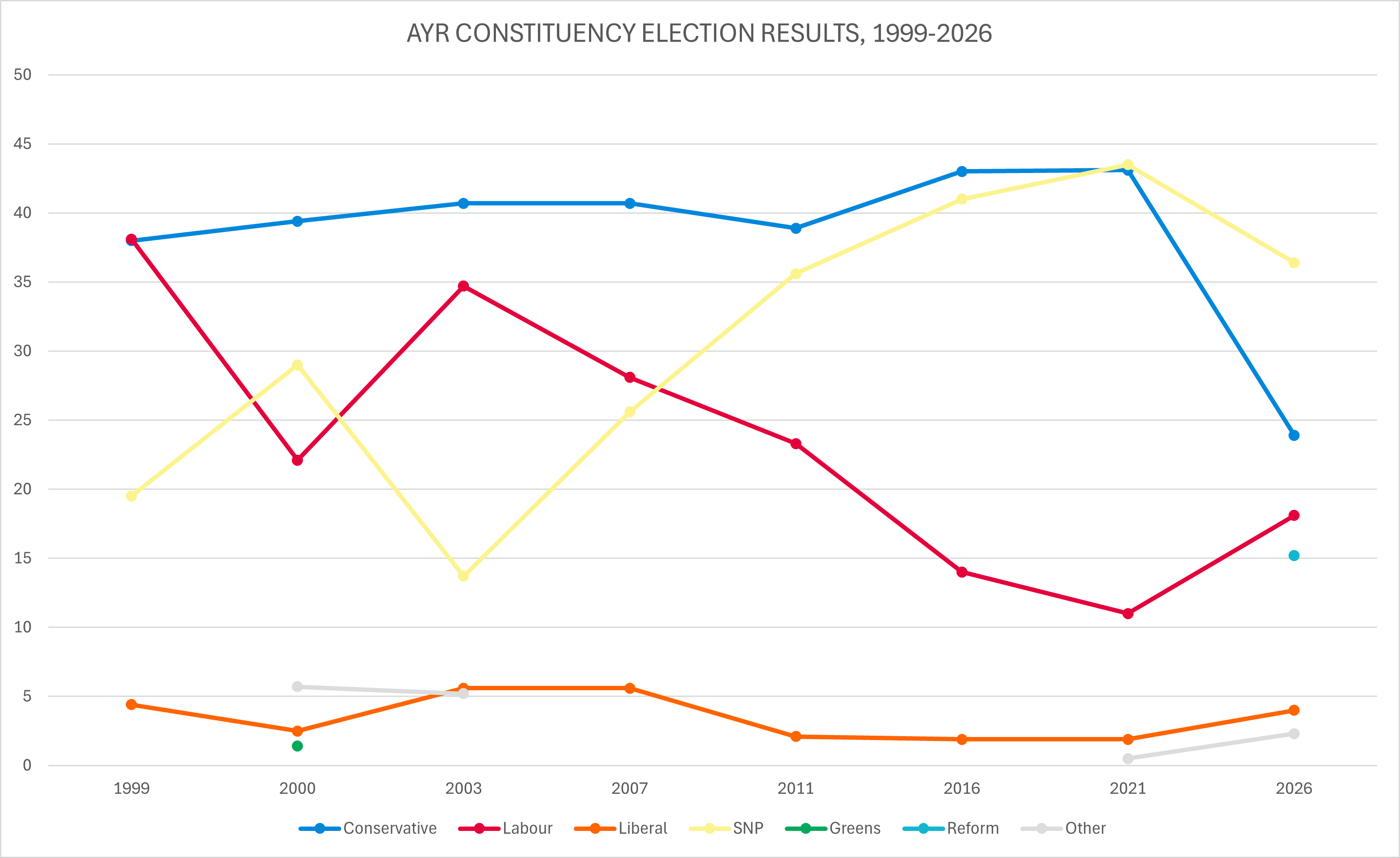
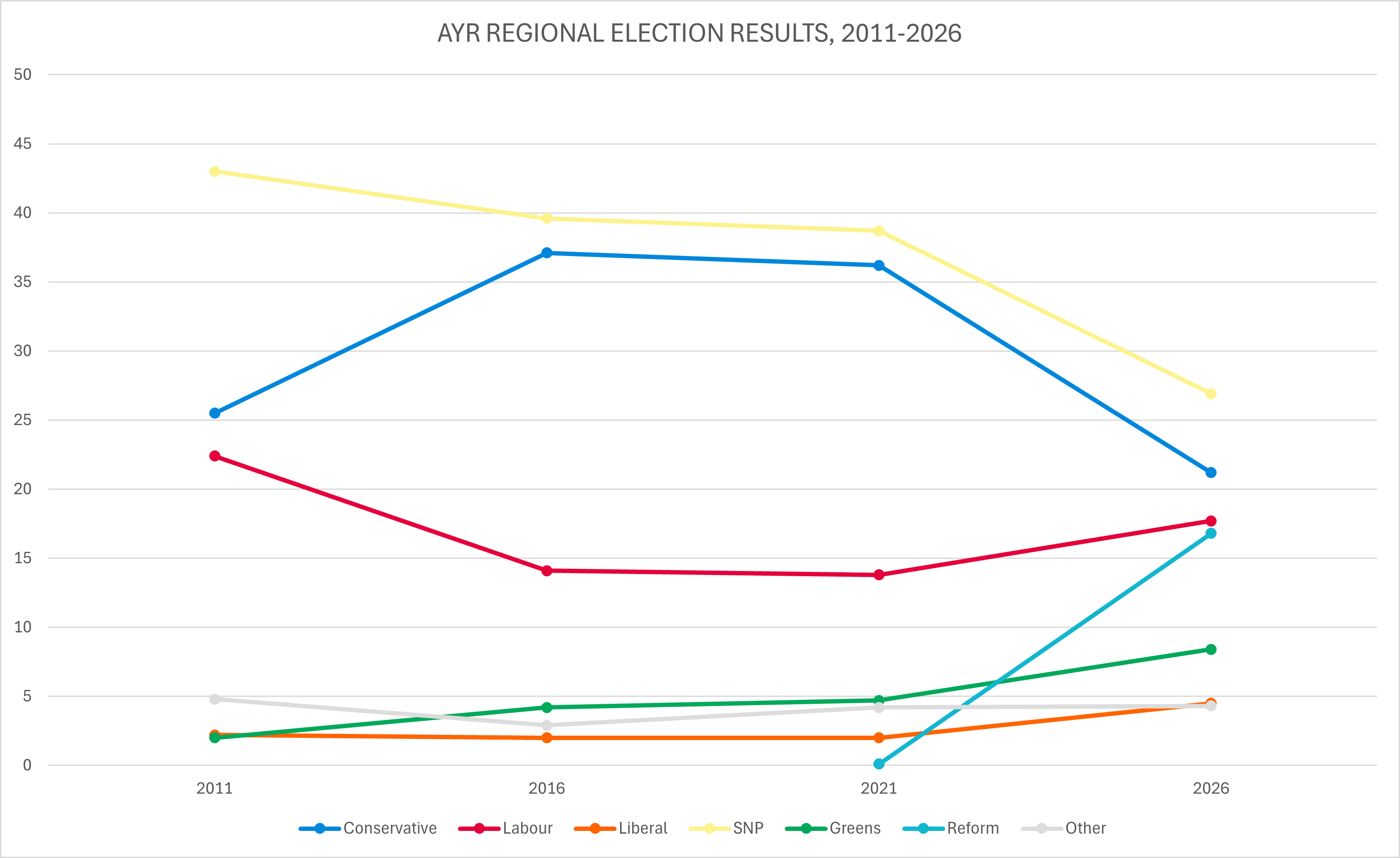

=== 2020s ===
2026 Scottish Parliament election: Ayr
| Party | Candidate | Constituency | | | Regional | | |
| Party | Candidate | Votes | % | ±% | Votes | % | ±% |
|---|---|---|---|---|---|---|---|
| SNP | Siobhian Brown (Note: Incumbent member for this constituency) | 12,848 | 36.4 | ▼7.1 | 9,517 | 26.9 | ▼11.8 |
| Conservative | Sharon Dowey (Note: Incumbent member on the party list, or for another constituency) | 8,448 | 23.9 | ▼19.2 | 7,509 | 21.2 | ▼15.0 |
| Labour | Brian McGinley | 6,394 | 18.1 | ▲7.1 | 6,273 | 17.7 | ▲3.9 |
| Reform | Andrew Russell | 5,355 | 15.2 | New | 5,925 | 16.8 | ▲16.7 |
| Green | | | | | 2,976 | 8.4 | ▲3.7 |
| Liberal Democrats | Desmond Buchanan | 1,427 | 4.0 | ▲2.1 | 1,611 | 4.5 | ▲2.5 |
| Independent | Denise Sommerville | 742 | 2.1 | New | 396 | 1.1 | New |
| AtLS | | | | | 278 | 0.8 | New |
| Independent Green Voice | | | | | 267 | 0.8 | ▲0.3 |
| Scottish Family | | | | | 223 | 0.6 | ▲0.2 |
| Scottish Socialist | | | | | 105 | 0.3 | New |
| ADF | | | | | 58 | 0.2 | New |
| Independent | Sean Davis | | | | 52 | 0.1 | New |
| Heritage | | | | | 51 | 0.1 | New |
| UKIP | | | | | 51 | 0.1 | Steady |
| Scottish Common Party | Muhammed Tufail | 78 | 0.2 | New | 40 | 0.1 | New |
| Scottish Libertarian | | | | | 38 | 0.1 | Steady |
| Majority | | 4,400 | 12.5 | ▲12.1 | | | |
| Valid votes | | 35,292 | | | 35,370 | | |
| Invalid votes | | 108 | | | 95 | | |
| Turnout | | 35,400 | 56.2 | ▼12.2 | 35,465 | 56.3 | ▼12.1 |

2021 Scottish Parliament election: Ayr
| Party | Candidate | Constituency | | | Regional | | |
| Party | Candidate | Votes | % | ±% | Votes | % | ±% |
|---|---|---|---|---|---|---|---|
| SNP | Siobhian Brown | 18,881 | 43.5 | ▲2.5 | 16,821 | 38.7 | ▼0.9 |
| Conservative | John Scott | 18,711 | 43.1 | ▲0.1 | 15,740 | 36.2 | ▼0.9 |
| Labour | Esther Clark | 4,766 | 11.0 | ▼3.0 | 5,994 | 13.8 | ▼0.3 |
| Green | | | | | 2,057 | 4.7 | ▲0.5 |
| Liberal Democrats | Jamie Ross | 808 | 1.9 | 0.0 | 876 | 2.0 | 0.0 |
| All for Unity | | | | | 734 | 1.4 | New |
| Alba | | | | | 494 | 1.1 | New |
| Independent Green Voice | | | | | 198 | 0.5 | New |
| Scottish Family | | | | | 177 | 0.4 | New |
| Abolish the Scottish Parliament | | | | | 93 | 0.2 | New |
| Freedom Alliance (UK) | | | | | 87 | 0.2 | New |
| Scotia Future | Chic Brodie | 267 | 0.5 | New | 67 | 0.2 | New |
| Reform | | | | | 59 | 0.1 | New |
| Scottish Libertarian | | | | | 49 | 0.1 | New |
| UKIP | | | | | 44 | 0.1 | ▼1.6 |
| Vanguard Party (UK) | | | | | 5 | 0.0 | New |
| Majority | | 170 | 0.4 | N/A | | | |
| Valid votes | | 43,433 | | | 43,495 | | |
| Invalid votes | | 128 | | | 94 | | |
| Turnout | | 43,561 | 68.4 | ▲7.1 | 43,589 | 68.4 | ▲7.1 |
| SNP gain from Conservative | | Swing | | ▲1.3 | | | |

=== 2010s ===
2016 Scottish Parliament election: Ayr
| Party | Candidate | Constituency | | | Regional | | |
| Party | Candidate | Votes | % | ±% | Votes | % | ±% |
|---|---|---|---|---|---|---|---|
| Conservative | John Scott (Note: Incumbent member for this constituency) | 16,183 | 43.0 | ▲4.1 | 13,991 | 37.1 | ▲11.6 |
| SNP | Jennifer Dunn | 15,433 | 41.0 | ▲5.4 | 14,938 | 39.6 | ▼3.4 |
| Labour | Brian McGinley | 5,283 | 14.0 | ▼9.3 | 5,306 | 14.1 | ▼8.3 |
| Green | | | | | 1,601 | 4.2 | ▲2.2 |
| Liberal Democrats | Robbie Simpson | 716 | 1.9 | ▼0.2 | 742 | 2.0 | ▼0.2 |
| UKIP | | | | | 639 | 1.7 | ▲0.8 |
| RISE | | | | | 195 | 0.5 | New |
| Solidarity | | | | | 155 | 0.4 | ▲0.3 |
| Clydesdale and South Scotland Independent | | | | | 119 | 0.3 | New |
| Majority | | 750 | 2.0 | ▼1.3 | | | |
| Valid votes | | 37,615 | | | 37,686 | | |
| Invalid votes | | 115 | | | 64 | | |
| Turnout | | 37,730 | 61.3 | ▲6.9 | 37,750 | 61.3 | ▲6.8 |
| Conservative hold | | Swing | | | | | |
Notes

2011 Scottish Parliament election: Ayr
| Party | Candidate | Constituency | | | Regional | | |
| Party | Candidate | Votes | % | ±% | Votes | % | ±% |
|---|---|---|---|---|---|---|---|
| Conservative | John Scott (Note: Incumbent member for this constituency) | 12,997 | 38.9 | N/A | 8,539 | 25.5 | N/A |
| SNP | Chic Brodie (Note: Elected on the party list) | 11,884 | 35.6 | N/A | 14,377 | 43.0 | N/A |
| Labour | Gordon McKenzie | 7,779 | 23.3 | N/A | 7,513 | 22.4 | N/A |
| Liberal Democrats | Eileen Taylor | 713 | 2.1 | N/A | 744 | 2.2 | N/A |
| Green | | | | | 685 | 2.0 | N/A |
| All-Scotland Pensioners Party | | | | | 595 | 1.8 | N/A |
| UKIP | | | | | 293 | 0.9 | N/A |
| Scottish Christian | | | | | 237 | 0.7 | N/A |
| BNP | | | | | 211 | 0.6 | N/A |
| Socialist Labour | | | | | 168 | 0.5 | N/A |
| Scottish Socialist | | | | | 76 | 0.2 | N/A |
| Solidarity | | | | | 30 | 0.1 | N/A |
| Majority | | 1,133 | 3.3 | N/A | | | |
| Valid votes | | 33,373 | | | 33,468 | | |
| Invalid votes | | 118 | | | 99 | | |
| Turnout | | 33,491 | 54.4 | N/A | 33,567 | 54.5 | N/A |
| Conservative win (new boundaries) | | | | | | | |

=== 2000s ===
2007 Scottish Parliament election: Ayr
| Party | Candidate | Votes | % | ±% |
|---|---|---|---|---|
| Conservative | John Scott | 12,619 | 40.7 | ±0.0 |
| Labour | John Duncan | 8,713 | 28.1 | −6.6 |
| SNP | Iain White | 7,952 | 25.6 | +11.9 |
| Liberal Democrats | Stuart Ritchie | 1,741 | 5.6 | ±0.0 |
| Majority | | 3,906 | 12.6 | +6.6 |
| Turnout | | 32,681 | | |
| Conservative hold | | Swing | | |

2003 Scottish Parliament election: Ayr
| Party | Candidate | Votes | % | ±% |
|---|---|---|---|---|
| Conservative | John Scott | 12,865 | 40.7 | +2.7 |
| Labour | Rita Miller | 10,975 | 34.7 | −3.4 |
| SNP | James Dornan | 4,334 | 13.7 | −5.8 |
| Liberal Democrats | Stuart Ritchie | 1,769 | 5.6 | +1.2 |
| Scottish Socialist | James Stewart | 1,648 | 5.2 | N/A |
| Majority | | 1,890 | 6.0 | N/A |
| Turnout | | 31,591 | | |
| Conservative hold | | Swing | | |

2000 Scottish Parliament by-election: Ayr
| Party | Candidate | Votes | % | ±% |
|---|---|---|---|---|
| Conservative | John Scott | 12,580 | 39.4 | +1.4 |
| SNP | Jim Mather | 9,236 | 29.0 | +9.5 |
| Labour | Rita Miller | 7,054 | 22.1 | −16.0 |
| Scottish Socialist | James Stewart | 1,345 | 4.2 | New |
| Liberal Democrats | Stuart Ritchie | 800 | 2.5 | −1.9 |
| Green | Gavin Corbett | 460 | 1.4 | New |
| The Radio Vet | William Botcherby | 186 | 0.6 | New |
| UKIP | Alistair McConnachie | 113 | 0.4 | New |
| ProLife Alliance | Robert Graham | 111 | 0.4 | New |
| Independent | Kevin Dillion | 15 | 0.1 | New |
| Majority | | 3,344 | 10.4 | N/A |
| Turnout | | 31,900 | | |
| Conservative gain from Labour | | Swing | | |

=== 1990s ===
1999 Scottish Parliament election: Ayr
| Party | Candidate | Votes | % | ±% |
|---|---|---|---|---|
| Labour | Ian Welsh | 14,263 | 38.1 | N/A |
| Conservative | Phil Gallie | 14,238 | 38.0 | N/A |
| SNP | Roger Mullin | 7,291 | 19.5 | N/A |
| Liberal Democrats | Elaine Morris | 1,662 | 4.4 | N/A |
| Majority | | 25 | 0.1 | N/A |
| Turnout | | 37,454 | | |
| Labour win (new seat) | | | | |

== Footnotes ==
=== Bibliography ===
- "Second Review of Scottish Parliament Boundaries: Report to Scottish Ministers" (PDF). Boundaries Scotland. April 2025.
