= Chic Brodie (politician) =

Scottish politician (1944–2022)

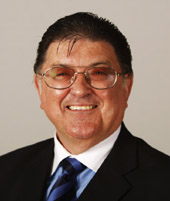

Leader of Scotia Future
- In office 8 September 2020 – 24 September 2022
- Preceded by: Office established
- Succeeded by: None (party dissolved)

Member of the Scottish Parliament for South Scotland
- In office 5 May 2011 – 24 March 2016

Councillor for Parkside, Surrey Heath
- In office 4 May 1995 – 4 May 1999

Personal details
- Born: Charles Gilchrist Brodie; 8 May 1944 Dundee, Scotland
- Died: 24 September 2022 (aged 78) Ayr, South Ayrshire, Scotland
- Party: Liberal (1974–1988); Liberal Democrats (1988–2010); SNP (2010–2017); Independent (2017–2020); Scotia Future (2020–2022)
- Children: Katie Brodie, Eilidh Brodie, Greg Brodie
- Education: University of St Andrews
- Occupation: Businessman

Charles Gilchrist Brodie (8 May 1944 – 24 September 2022), better known as Chic Brodie, was a Scottish politician. He served as a Scottish National Party (SNP) Member of the Scottish Parliament (MSP) for the South Scotland region from 2011 until 2016.

Before joining the SNP in 2010, Brodie had been an active member of the Liberal Party and then the Liberal Democrats from the 1970s. He stood as a Liberal Democrat candidate at the 1992, 1997 and 2001 UK general elections, and as a Liberal at the general elections of October 1974, 1979, 1983 and 1987. Brodie was latterly the co-founder and leader of political party Scotia Future from 2020 until his death in 2022.

== Early life and education ==
Brodie was born in Dundee on 8 May 1944. He was educated at Morgan Academy in Dundee and graduated from the University of St Andrews in 1966 with a BSc in Mathematics and Economics.

== Politics ==
Brodie first sought election to Parliament as a Liberal candidate in the October 1974 UK general election, standing in Dundee East. He contested that seat again in 1979. He had been selected to contest Glasgow Hillhead for the Liberal Party at the next election; a seat the party was campaigning actively in. However, at the start of 1982, the incumbent Conservative MP Tam Galbraith died, triggering a by-election. The fledgling SDP, who had created an electoral pact - termed the 'Alliance' - with the Liberals immediately declaring they wished to fight the seat and wanted former Cabinet minister Roy Jenkins to be their candidate. Critical of the fact that the SDP and Liberals were 'haggling only hours' after Galbraith had died, Brodie initially declined to comment on the situation, other than to indicate he would act in the best interests of the Alliance. Ultimately after talks with Jenkins in London, Brodie agreed to withdraw in his favour. Jenkins would go on to win the by-election.

Brodie then contested Ayr in 1983 and North West Surrey in 1987. He also stood as a Liberal/SDP Alliance candidate in Surrey Heath's Old Dean ward at the 1987 local election, finishing third with 475 votes. At the 1991 local election, he stood in Surrey Heath's Bisley and Heatherside wards, finishing second and fourth respectively with 363 votes in Bisley and 879 votes in Heatherside. He fought Glasgow Garscadden as a Liberal Democrat at the 1992 general election, finishing in fourth place in the seat held by then-Shadow Scottish Secretary Donald Dewar. Brodie was eventually elected in Surrey Heath's Parkside ward at the 1995 local election, coming second with 628 votes.

Brodie stood as the Liberal Democrat candidate for Perth at the 1997 general election. At the 2001 general election, Brodie stood for the Liberal Democrats at Greenock and Inverclyde, finishing second with 5,039 votes. He then joined the Scottish National Party in 2010, first standing for them at the 2010 general election for Ayr, Carrick and Cumnock, where he finished in third place; moving ahead of the Liberal Democrats who took fourth.

=== Scottish Parliament ===
Brodie was an SNP candidate in the 2011 Scottish Parliament election. He was not successful in the constituency vote for Ayr, but was returned on the regional list as an MSP for South Scotland.

At Parliament, he was a deputy convener of the Public Petitions committee and a member of the Economy, Energy and Tourism Committee and the Subordinate Legislation Committee (see Committees of the Scottish Parliament). He was also Convener of the Cross-Party Group on Social Enterprise, and a member of the groups on China, Golf and Nuclear Disarmament.

From 2013 to 2014, Brodie claimed £54,297 in expenses, the highest amount for a MSP that session.

In August 2015, he failed to win selection as the SNP candidate for the Ayr constituency, losing out to Glasgow councillor Jennifer Dunn. In October 2015, he was included on the SNP's regional list for South Scotland, placed seventh. The SNP returned three MSPs from their list.

=== Controversies ===
In March 2016, questions were raised about Brodie's Parliamentary expenses. Over the five years that he had been a MSP, he paid a total of £87,616 for "outsourced constituency work" to Caledonii Resources, a company set up in 2010. That company was 90% owned by Corri Wilson, who founded it one month before she became an SNP councillor for Ayr East ward in 2012. Some £20,000 was transferred during the Scottish independence referendum campaign in 2014 and a further £20,000 being transferred during the 2015 UK general election campaign.

=== Independent candidate ===
In January 2017, Brodie resigned from the SNP and announced that he would stand as an Independent candidate in the Ayr West ward of South Ayrshire as part of the 2017 Council election. At the election, he secured 506 first preference votes, finishing last behind six other candidates.

=== Scotia Future ===
In 2020, Brodie announced that he would be founding a new party, Scotia Future, and would stand at the 2021 Scottish Parliament election.

Brodie contested the constituency seat of Ayr in the election, but was unsuccessful, getting only 267 votes (0.6%). He also stood as the party’s candidate for the South Scotland Region, but was not elected.

== Personal life and death ==
Brodie died after a short battle with oesophageal cancer on 24 September 2022, at the age of 78. Following his death, various Scottish political figures, including then-Deputy First Minister John Swinney who described Brodie as a "lovely colleague and friend".
