= 2012 South Ayrshire Council election =

South Ayrshire Council election

- 3 May 2012

All 30 seats to South Ayrshire Council 16 seats needed for a majority
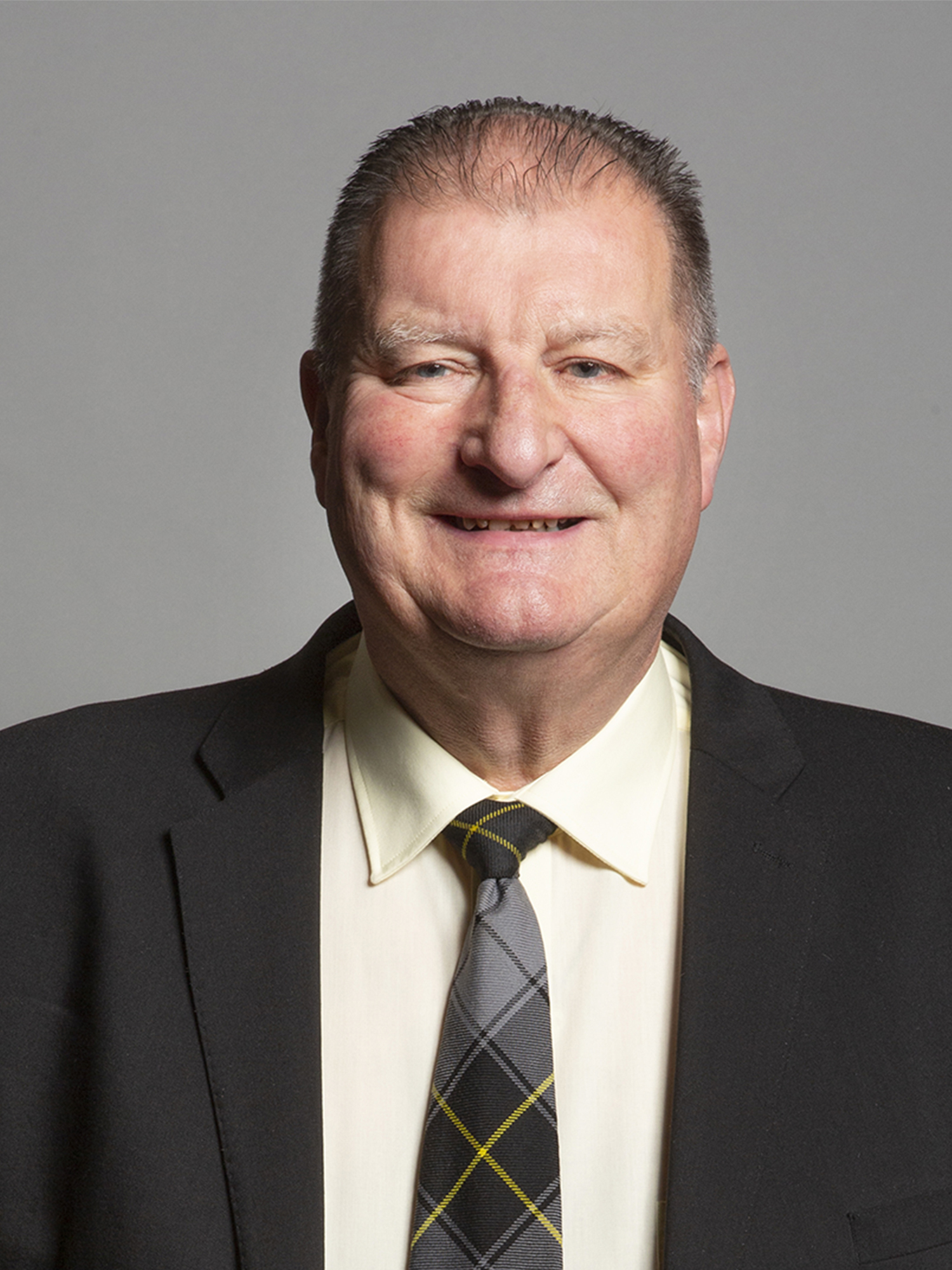
	First party	Second party
	Con
Leader	Bill McIntosh	Allan Dorans
Party	Conservative	SNP
Leader's seat	Troon	Ayr West
Last election	12 seats, 37.2%	8 seats, 25.3%
Seats before	12	8
Seats won	10	9
Seat change	▼2	▲1
Popular vote	12,050	11,203
Percentage	31.5%	29.3%
Swing	▼5.7%	▲4.0%
	Third party	Fourth party
	Lab	Ind
Leader	John McDowall	Brian Connolly
Party	Labour	Independent
Leader's seat	Girvan and South Carrick	Maybole, North Carrick & Coylton
Last election	9 seats, 28.4%	1 seat, 8.3%
Seats before	9	1
Seats won	9	2
Seat change	Steady	▲1
Popular vote	9,563	5,166
Percentage	25.0%	13.5%
Swing	▼3.4%	▲5.2%
- The 8 multi-member wards
Council Leader before election
Bill McIntosh
(Conservative)
No overall control
Council Leader after election
Bill McIntosh
(Conservative)
No overall control

The 2012 South Ayrshire Council election took place on 3 May 2012 on the same day as the 31 other Scottish local government elections. As with other Scottish council elections, it was held using single transferable vote (STV) – a form of proportional representation – in which multiple candidates are elected in each ward and voters rank candidates in order of preference.

The election saw the Conservatives remain as the largest party on the council despite losing two seats. The Scottish National Party (SNP) gained one seat and were second on the popular vote as they tied with Labour as the second largest party. Labour retained their nine seats despite their vote share decreasing by 3.4% and after suffering three defections during the last term. The number of independent candidates elected doubled to two seats.

Following the election, the Conservatives formed a minority administration working in a partnership agreement with Labour and both independents. This replaced the previous Conservative minority administration.

== Results ==
2012 South Ayrshire Council election result
Party	Seats	Gains	Losses	Net gain/loss	Seats %	Votes %	Votes	+/−
Conservative	10	0	2	▼2	33.3	31.51	12,050	▼5.7
SNP	9	1	0	▲1	30.0	29.3	11,203	▲4.0
Labour	9	0	0	Steady	30.0	25.0	9,563	▼3.4
Independent	2	1	0	▲1	6.7	13.5	5,166	▲5.2
Liberal Democrats	0	0	0	Steady	0.0	0.7	255	New
Total	30						38,237	

Note: "Votes" are the first preference votes. The net gain/loss and percentage changes relate to the result of the previous Scottish local elections on 3 May 2007. This may differ from other published sources showing gain/loss relative to seats held at dissolution of Scotland's councils.

=== Summary by ward ===
Results of the 2012 South Ayrshire Council election by ward
Ward	%	Cllrs	%	Cllrs	%	Cllrs	%	Cllrs	%	Cllrs	Total Cllrs
Ward	Conservative		SNP		Labour		Independents		Others		Total Cllrs
Troon	39.6	2	26.9	1	21.0	1	12.4	0			4
Prestwick	38.9	2	32.9	1	25.9	1			2.3	0	4
Ayr North	15.9	1	38.2	1	45.9	2					4
Ayr East	33.0	1	31.4	2	23.4	1	12.2	0			4
Ayr West	48.2	2	25.0	1	15.3	1	9.3	0	2.2	0	4
Kyle	23.5	1	28.7	1	32.8	1	15.1	0			3
Maybole, North Carrick and Coylton	21.3	1	30.3	1	22.9	1	25.6	1			4
Girvan and South Carrick	15.8	0	19.7	1	17.0	1	47.4	1			3
Total	31.5	10	29.3	9	25.0	9	13.5	2	0.7	0	30

== Ward results ==
=== Troon ===
The Conservatives (2), Labour (1) and the SNP (1) retained the seats they had won at the previous election.

Troon - 4 seats
Party	Candidate	FPv%	Count				
Party	Candidate	FPv%	1	2	3	4	5
Conservative	Peter Convery (incumbent)	22.0	1,289				
Labour	Philip Saxton (incumbent)	21.0	1,233				
Conservative	Bill McIntosh (incumbent)	17.6	1,035	1,130	1,137	1,160	1,207
SNP	Nan McFarlane (incumbent)	17.5	1,026	1,033	1,043	1,495	
Independent	Pat Brown	12.4	730	734	750	801	912
SNP	Elaine McBean Little (Note: Sitting councillor for Ayr West.)	9.4	551	553	557		
Electorate: 12,146 Valid: 5,864 Spoilt: 59 Quota: 1,173 Turnout: 48.3%

=== Prestwick ===
The Conservatives (2), Labour (1) and the SNP (1) retained the seats they had won at the previous election.

Prestwick - 4 seats
Party	Candidate	FPv%	Count				
Party	Candidate	FPv%	1	2	3	4	5
Labour	Helen Moonie (incumbent)	25.9	1,458				
SNP	Ian Cochrane	24.9	1,399				
Conservative	Hugh Hunter (incumbent)	23.1	1,296				
Conservative	Margaret Toner (incumbent)	15.9	892	933	941	1,089	1,154
SNP	John Wallace	8.0	448	513	754	760	806
Liberal Democrats	Allan MacBain	2.3	128	185	193	199	
Electorate: 12,238 Valid: 5,621 Spoilt: 102 Quota: 1,125 Turnout: 45.9%

=== Ayr North ===
Labour (2), the SNP (1) and the Conservatives (1) retained the seats they had won at the previous election. In 2007, Cllr Campbell was elected as a Labour candidate but subsequently resigned from the party and later joined the SNP.

Ayr North - 4 seats
Party	Candidate	FPv%	Count				
Party	Candidate	FPv%	1	2	3	4	5
Labour	Ian Cavana (incumbent)	34.0	1,481				
SNP	Douglas Campbell (incumbent)	31.2	1,361				
Conservative	John Hampton (incumbent)	15.9	692	715	744	762	975
Labour	Rita Miller	11.9	519	1,003			
SNP	Tom Slider (incumbent)	7.0	305	332	724	751	
Electorate: 12,643 Valid: 4,358 Spoilt: 115 Quota: 872 Turnout: 34.5%

=== Ayr East ===
Labour and the SNP retained the seats they had won at the previous elections while the Conservatives retained one seat and lost one seat to the SNP.

Ayr East - 4 seats
Party	Candidate	FPv%	Count						
Party	Candidate	FPv%	1	2	3	4	5	6	7
SNP	Ian Douglas (incumbent)	24.2	1,238						
Labour	Brian McGinley	23.4	1,199						
Conservative	Mary Kilpatrick (incumbent)	22.2	1,135						
Conservative	Patricia McKeand	10.8	554	557	571	665	691	758	
SNP	Corri Wilson (Note: Cllr Corri Wilson was elected as MP for Ayr, Carrick and Cumnock on 7 May 2015 and subsequently resigned her council seat on 23 June 2015.)	7.2	371	552	583	586	664	788	902
Independent	Andrew Bryden	6.5	331	337	364	367	495		
Independent	Eddie Bulik (incumbent)	5.7	291	298	323	326			
Electorate: 11,669 Valid: 5,119 Spoilt: 84 Quota: 1,024 Turnout: 43.9%

=== Ayr West ===
The Conservatives (2), Labour (1) and the SNP (1) retained the seats they had won at the previous election.

Ayr West - 4 seats
Party	Candidate	FPv%	Count						
Party	Candidate	FPv%	1	2	3	4	5	6	7
Conservative	Bill Grant (incumbent)	33.8	1,992						
Labour	Kirsty Darwent	15.3	901	929	939	976	1,007	1,049	1,267
Conservative	Robin Reid (incumbent)	14.4	846	1,456					
SNP	Allan Dorans	14.2	836	858	867	874	1,410		
SNP	Roddy MacDonald	10.8	638	660	673	688			
Independent	Brian McKinlay	9.3	549	607	671	734	781	846	
Liberal Democrats	Nicola Prigg	2.2	127	143	177				
Electorate: 12,401 Valid: 5,889 Spoilt: 57 Quota: 1,178 Turnout: 47.5%

=== Kyle ===
The SNP, Labour and the Conservatives retained the seats they had won at the previous election.

Kyle - 3 seats
Party	Candidate	FPv%	Count	
Party	Candidate	FPv%	1	2
Labour	Andy Campbell (incumbent)	32.7	1,207	
SNP	John Allan (incumbent)	28.7	1,057	
Conservative	Hywel Davies (incumbent) (Note: Cllr Davies resigned from the Conservatives in May 2013 and became an independent.)	23.5	865	923
Independent	Arthur Spurling	15.1	556	647
Electorate: 8,918 Valid: 3,685 Spoilt: 43 Quota: 922 Turnout: 41.3%

=== Maybole, North Carrick and Coylton ===
Labour, the SNP, the Conservatives and independent councillor Brian Connolly retained the seats they had won at the previous election.

Maybole, North Carrick and Coylton - 4 seats
Party	Candidate	FPv%	Count	
Party	Candidate	FPv%	1	2
Independent	Brian Connolly (incumbent)	25.5	1,100	
Labour	Sandra Goldie (incumbent)	22.9	986	
Conservative	Ann Galbraith (incumbent)	21.3	916	
SNP	William James Grant	18.8	810	894
SNP	Mairi Low (incumbent)	11.4	493	527
Electorate: 8,918 Valid: 4,305 Spoilt: 57 Quota: 862 Turnout: 38.8%

=== Girvan and South Carrick ===
The SNP and Labour retained the seats they had won at the previous election while independent candidate Alec Clark gained a seat from the Conservatives.

Girvan and South Carrick - 3 seats
Party	Candidate	FPv%	Count		
Party	Candidate	FPv%	1	2	3
Independent	Alec Clark	47.4	1,609		
SNP	Alec Oattes (incumbent)	19.7	670	822	985
Labour	John McDowall (incumbent)	17.0	579	766	956
Conservative	Iain Fitzsimmons (incumbent)	15.8	538	741	
Electorate: 7,920 Valid: 3,396 Spoilt: 31 Quota: 850 Turnout: 42.9%

== By-election ==
Ayr East SNP councillor Corri Wilson was elected as MP for Ayr, Carrick and Cumnock on 7 May 2015. She resigned her council seat on 23 June 2015 and a by-election was held on 17 September 2015. The seat was held by the SNP's John Wallace.

Ayr East by-election (17 September 2015) - 1 seat
Party	Candidate	FPv%	Count			
Party	Candidate	FPv%	1	2	3	4
Conservative	Dan McCroskrie	38.5	1,527	1,534	1,589	1,740
SNP	John Wallace	38.0	1,507	1,540	1,600	1,775
Labour	Susan Wilson	16.2	642	654	708	
Independent	Andrew Bryden	5.5	218	227		
Green	Boyd Murdoch	1.9	76			
Electorate: 11,638 Valid: 3,970 Spoilt: 36 Quota: 1,986 Turnout: 34.4%
