= Corri Wilson =

Scottish politician (born 1965)

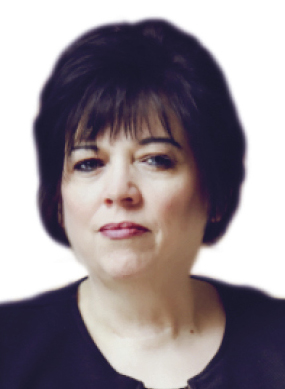

Director of Operations of the Alba Party (Note: The position was known as General Secretary between February and April 2025.)
- In office 27 February 2025 – 26 March 2026
- Leader: Kenny MacAskill
- Preceded by: Chris McEleny
- Succeeded by: Office abolished

Member of Parliament for Ayr, Carrick and Cumnock
- In office 7 May 2015 – 3 May 2017
- Preceded by: Sandra Osborne
- Succeeded by: Bill Grant

Personal details
- Born: 11 April 1965 (age 61) Ayr, Scotland
- Party: SNP (2012–2021); Alba (2021–2026)
- Education: University of the West of Scotland

Corraine Wilson (born 11 April 1965) is a Scottish politician and former civil servant who served as Director of Operations of the Alba Party from February 2025 until March 2026.

Previously a member of the Scottish National Party (SNP), Wilson was the Member of Parliament (MP) for Ayr, Carrick and Cumnock from 2015 to 2017.

== Early life ==
Wilson worked in the Civil Service for 20 years after leaving school. She went on to study Psychology at the University of the West of Scotland and set up her own business and events company called "Caledonii Resources" in April 2012 just before being elected to serve as a Councillor in Ayr East in the 2012 South Ayrshire Council election.

== Political career ==
Wilson became a South Ayrshire Councillor in the 2012 local elections for the ward of Ayr East. She was elected to the British Parliament in the 2015 general election.

From June 2015 until August 2016, she was one of 125 MPs who employed a member of their family: employing her son Kieran as a caseworker/personal assistant. From 15 September 2016, she had employed her daughter Shannon as a caseworker/personal assistant, which was allowed under IPSA rules up until the election in June 2017.

From the period of 1 June 2015 to 31 May 2016, the statement, Wilson claimed a total of £94,545.41 in public expenses, which was the 7th highest amount of any MP in the United Kingdom that year.

In 2016, Wilson was appointed as disabilities spokesperson for the SNP. During Wilson's time on the Welfare Reform and Work Bill she argued against the benefit cap, benefit sanctions and the removal of poverty targets. Wilson campaigned in favour of the United Kingdom remaining a member of the European Union at the 2016 United Kingdom European Union membership referendum, then later voted against the European Union (Notification of Withdrawal) Bill 2017.

During her time in office, Wilson never voted against her party and attended 277 of 467 votes (59.3%) – well below average amongst MPs.

She stood for re-election at the 2017 UK general election, but lost to Conservative Bill Grant on a 17.5% swing, with Grant overturning Wilson's 15,137 vote lead over the Conservatives to gain the constituency with a 2,774 vote majority.

On 27 March 2021, Wilson announced that she had left the SNP, and had joined the Alba Party, at the party's campaign launch for the 2021 Scottish Parliament election. Wilson was the second-placed candidate on the party list for the South Scotland region, though she was unsuccessful, as were the other Alba candidates in that election.

She stood in Ayr, Carrick and Cumnock at the 2024 general election, receiving 1.2% of the vote.

=== Controversies ===
In 2016, Wilson and Chic Brodie, an SNP MSP representing the South Scotland electoral region at the Scottish Parliament, faced controversy over a public expenses scandal, with Chic Brodie transferring £87,616 of public expenses into Corri Wilson's Caledonii Resources for "outsourced constituency work" after her election as councillor to the Ayr East ward in 2012, with some £20,000 being transferred during the Scottish independence referendum campaign in 2014 and a further £20,000 being transferred during the 2015 UK general election campaign, well in excess of Independent Parliamentary Standards Authority guidelines. The expenses were not recorded within Corri Wilson's Register of Members' Interests. Caledonii Resources was later dissolved in May 2017.

== Notes ==
Parliament of the United Kingdom
Preceded by Sandra Osborne	Member of Parliament for Ayr, Carrick and Cumnock; 2015–2017	Succeeded by Bill Grant
