= Bill Grant (British politician) =

Scottish politician

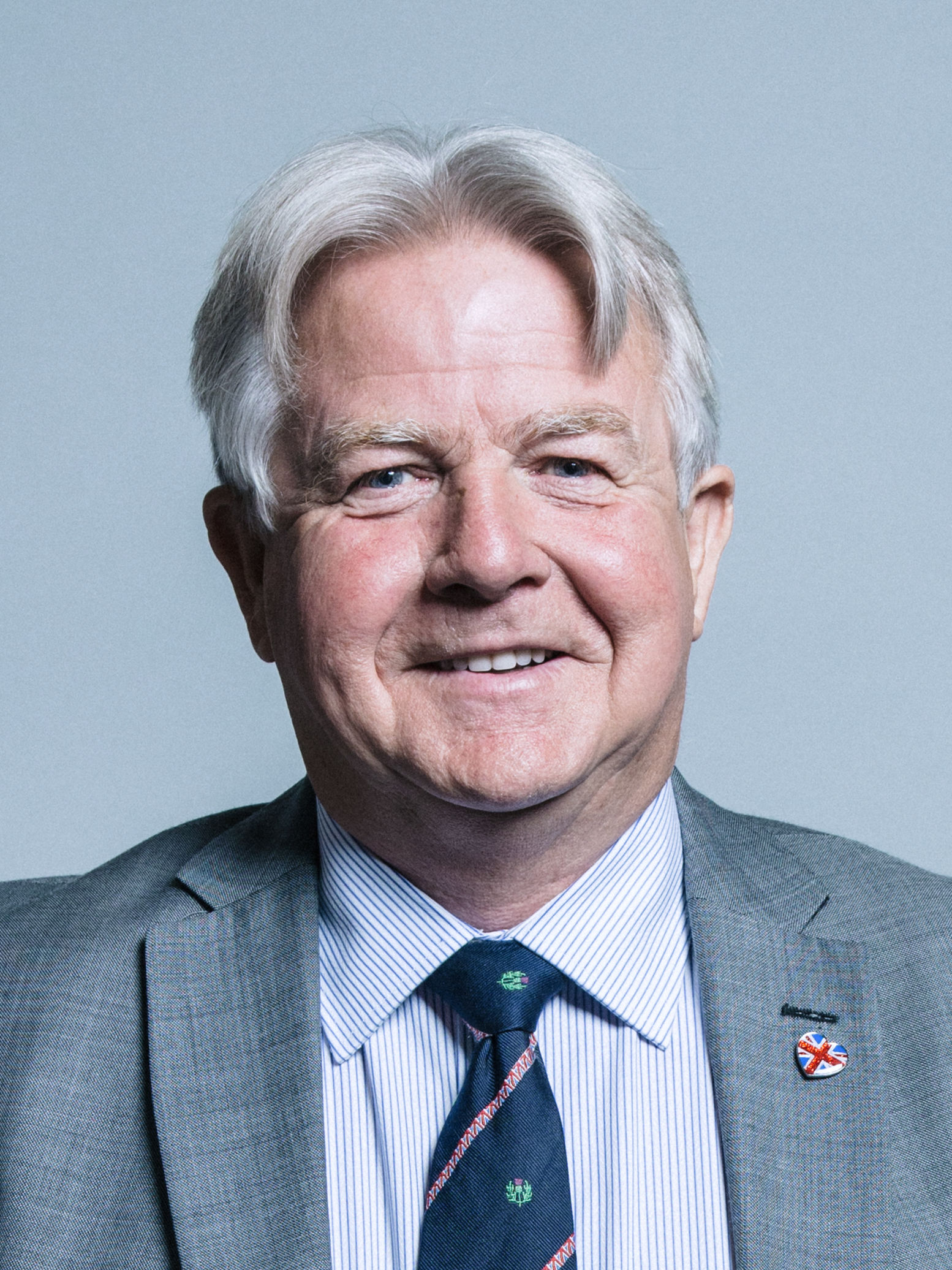
- Official portrait, 2017

Member of Parliament for Ayr, Carrick and Cumnock
- In office 8 June 2017 – 6 November 2019
- Preceded by: Corri Wilson
- Succeeded by: Allan Dorans

Councillor for Ayr West, South Ayrshire
- In office 3 May 2007 – 4 May 2017

Personal details
- Born: William Grant; 14 August 1951 (age 75) Glasgow, Scotland, UK
- Party: Conservative
- Spouse: Agnes Grant
- Children: 2
- Education: University of Edinburgh

William Grant (born 14 August 1951) is a Scottish Conservative Party politician who was the Member of Parliament (MP) for the Ayr, Carrick and Cumnock UK Parliamentary constituency from June 2017 to November 2019.

== Early life ==
A miner's son, Grant was raised in Rankinston in Doon Valley, East Ayrshire, and educated at Littlemill Primary in northern Rankinston and Cumnock Academy.

After his education, Grant moved to Ayr and worked in the fire brigade for 31 years, retiring as a deputy commander in the Strathclyde Fire and Rescue Service. He served as a justice of the peace for ten years on Ayr District Court.

== Political career ==
Bill Grant was first elected as a Conservative councillor on South Ayrshire Council at the 2007 Council elections, being elected to serve as one of four councillors in the Ayr West ward with more First Preference votes than any other candidate in the ward at 2,176 votes (30.3%), taking more votes than fellow Conservatives Robin Reid and Alistair Kerr. He was re-elected in the 2012 Council elections with 1,992 First Preference votes (33.8%), again with more First Preference votes than any other candidate, including fellow Conservative Robin Reid.

Grant stood as the Scottish Conservative Party candidate in Ayr, Carrick and Cumnock at the 2010 UK general election, coming in second place behind Labour's Sandra Osborne with a total of 11,721 votes (25.5%), an increase of 2.4% from the previous election of 2005. He successfully gained the seat for the Conservatives at the 2017 general election from the SNP's Corri Wilson, taking 18,550 votes (40.1%) ahead of the SNP's Corri Wilson on 15,776 votes (34.1%), with a 2,774 vote (6.0%) majority, on a 17.5% swing from the SNP to the Conservatives.

Grant made his maiden speech to the UK House of Commons on 3 July 2017. In his first year in office as an MP, Bill Grant spoke in 89 debates and voted in 266 out of 284 votes (93.7%) in the Parliament, well above average amongst MPs. During this period, Bill Grant only rebelled against his party once in the appointment of Sir Ian Kennedy as Electoral Commissioner.

Grant was a proponent for the United Kingdom remaining a member of the European Union during the 2016 United Kingdom European Union membership referendum. He subsequently declared his support of Prime Minister Theresa May's negotiated Brexit settlement provided that assurances were made on the issue of the Northern Irish backstop and UK fishing rights.

In 2017 and 2018, Grant was twice caught sleeping in the House of Commons for which he was dubbed "Sleep-gate MP" in the local press. First, in December 2017, Grant appeared to have fallen asleep during a debate on pensions equality for women however, he claimed he was "listening intently". Then, in July 2018, during questions to the then Secretary of State for Housing, Communities and Local Government, James Brokenshire, Grant was again caught asleep but this time admitted that he had taken "a wee nap" and was "guilty as charged".

Grant announced in September 2019 that he would not contest the 2019 general election. The Conservatives ended up losing Ayr, Carrick and Cumnock to the SNP at that general election.

== Personal life ==
Grant is a member of the Kyle and Carrick Civic Society, the Alloway Rotary, the Ayr Classic Motorcycle Club and the Ayr Building Preservation Trust. He is a keen DIY, gardening and motorcycling enthusiast.

During his time as a councillor for Ayr West, Bill Grant was well known to be found picking up litter in Ayr over the weekends. In March 2018, Bill Grant performed a citizens arrest in Bridges Bar, Ayr, while out for a drink against a man responsible for physically assaulting the landlord of the pub.

Parliament of the United Kingdom
Preceded by Corri Wilson	Member of Parliament for Ayr, Carrick and Cumnock; 2017–2019	Succeeded by Allan Dorans
