= Siobhian Brown =

Scottish Children, Young People and The Promise Minister

Siobhian Brown MSP
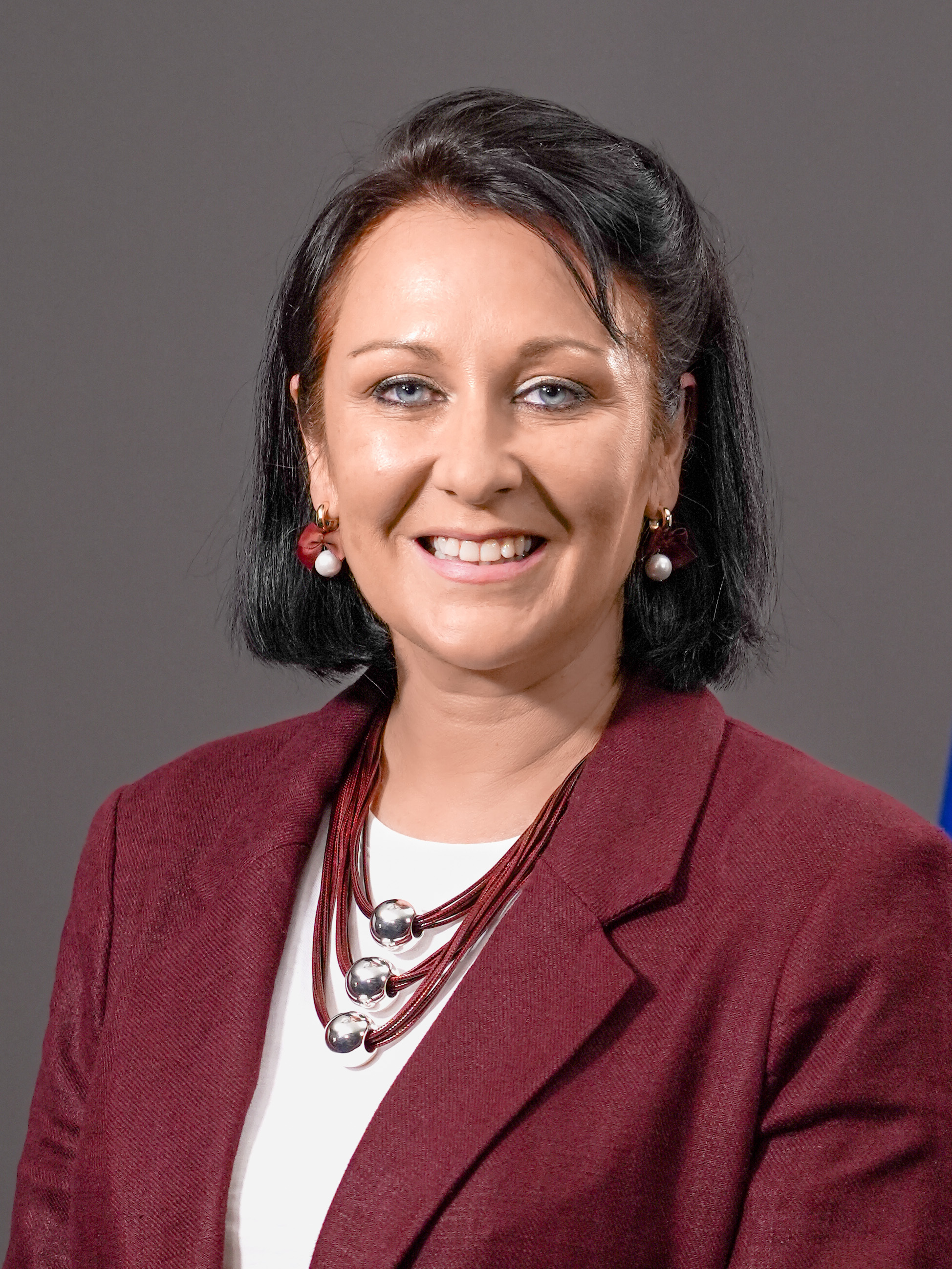
- Official portrait, 2026

Minister for Children, Young People and the Promise
- Incumbent
- Assumed office 20 May 2026
- First Minister: John Swinney
- Preceded by: Natalie Don-Innes

Minister for Victims and Community Safety
- In office 29 March 2023 – 20 May 2026
- First Minister: Humza Yousaf; John Swinney
- Preceded by: Elena Whitham
- Succeeded by: Kirsten Oswald

Convener of the COVID-19 Recovery Committee
- In office 23 June 2021 – 30 March 2023
- Deputy: Murdo Fraser

Member of the Scottish Parliament for Ayr
- Incumbent
- Assumed office 6 May 2021
- Preceded by: John Scott
- Majority: 4,400 (12.5%)

Personal details
- Born: 20 October 1972 (age 53) London, England
- Party: Scottish National Party

Siobhian Brown (born 20 October 1972) is a Scottish National Party politician. She has been a Member of the Scottish Parliament (MSP) for Ayr since the 2021 election, having been re-elected at the 2026 election. She was previously a councillor for the Ayr West ward of South Ayrshire Council. She also served as Minister for Victims and Community Safety from 2023 until 2026.

== Political career ==
Brown joined the Scottish National Party the day after the 2014 Scottish independence referendum. She was a councillor on South Ayrshire Council for the Ayr West ward from 2017 until her resignation in 2022.

=== Scottish Parliament ===
In November 2020, she was selected as the SNP's candidate for the Ayr constituency in the 2021 Scottish Parliament election. In May 2021, she was elected as a member of the Scottish Parliament for Ayr with a majority of 170 votes (0.4%), defeating the incumbent John Scott who had been the Scottish Conservatives' longest serving MSP. She was re-elected at the 2026 election with an increased majority of 4,400 (12.5%) votes.

Brown was as a Convener of the COVID-19 Recovery Committee June 2021 until 2023.

In 2023 Brown was appointed as Minister for Victims and Community Safety by Humza Yousaf. She later recounted that she was "extremely surprised" by Yousaf's decision to appoint her minister, as she stood by Kate Forbes, who was criticised for her disavowal of the Gender Recognition Reform Bill on religious grounds.

== Personal life ==
Born in London to Scottish parents, Brown emigrated to Sydney, Australia when she was three years old. After working in Spain, Italy, London and Scotland, she moved to Ayrshire—where her parents are from—in 1999. Brown has four children (including a step-daughter), with her youngest being born when she was 44 years old. In 2016 she founded the South Ayrshire Babybank and remains a volunteer for the organisation.

Scottish Parliament
Preceded by John Scott	Member of the Scottish Parliament for Ayr; 2021–present	Incumbent
