= Sandra Osborne =

Scottish politician and former Labour MP

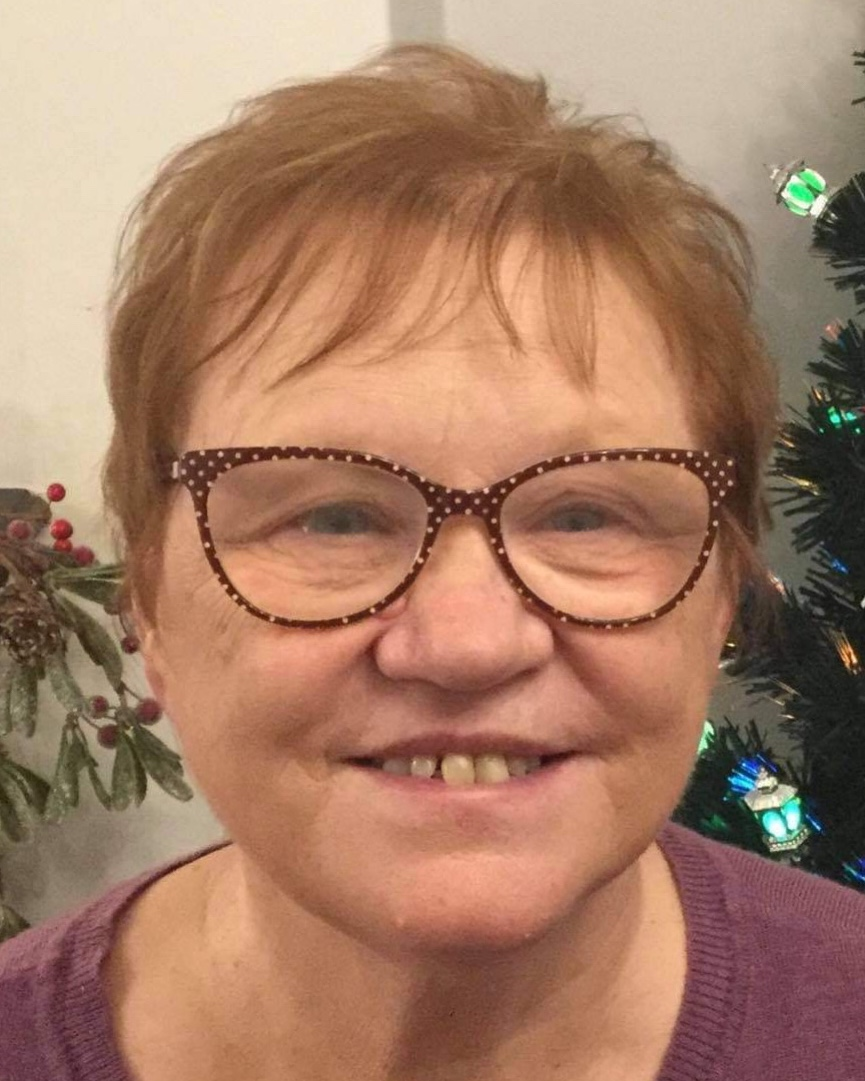
- Osborne in 2021

Member of Parliament for Ayr, Carrick and Cumnock Ayr (1997–2005)
- In office 1 May 1997 – 30 March 2015
- Preceded by: Phil Gallie
- Succeeded by: Corri Wilson

Personal details
- Born: 23 February 1956 (age 70) Paisley, Renfrewshire, Scotland
- Party: Labour
- Spouse: Alastair Osborne
- Children: 2
- Education: University of Strathclyde

Sandra Currie Osborne (née Clark, born 23 February 1956) is a Scottish Labour politician, who was the Member of Parliament for Ayr, Carrick and Cumnock from the 2005 to 2015 general elections. She was first elected as MP for the Ayr constituency in 1997, and resigned from a government job in 2003 over the Iraq War. She was a member of the Foreign Affairs Select Committee from 2005 to 2010 and again from 2013. She was a member of the Defence Select Committee 2010-13 and was a member of the Council of Europe.

== Before Parliament ==
Osborne was born and brought up in the deprived Ferguslie Park district, in Paisley. She was educated at Camphill Secondary School in Paisley. She later attended evening classes before going on to Jordanhill College where she gained the Diploma in Community Education. After working as a community worker in Glasgow she moved to Ayrshire, where she spent fourteen years working as a counsellor with Women's Aid, based in Kilmarnock. During that time, she also studied part-time at the University of Strathclyde where she graduated with a Master of Science in Equality and Discrimination. In 1997, she was one of the shortlisted finalists in the Scottish Woman of the Year Awards (Glasgow Evening Times) nominated for her work with abused women.

== Political career ==
Osborne was the councillor for Whitletts on Kyle and Carrick District Council and South Ayrshire Council where she also served as Convener of Community Services (Housing and Social Work). She is a member of the trade union Unite (formerly TGWU) and has been active in the Labour Party since 1976, serving for a time as Ayr CLP Secretary. In 1983, she was a member of the Scottish contingent on the People's March for Jobs who walked from Glasgow to London. She was selected as a Labour candidate in Ayr from an all-women shortlist. In May 1997, she was elected as MP for the Ayr constituency, becoming Ayr's first-ever Labour MP and first ever female MP. She was re-elected at the 2001 general election.

Osborne served as Parliamentary Private Secretary to Helen Liddell, the Secretary of State for Scotland, from June 2002 until she stepped down in March 2003 over her opposition to going to war with Iraq. She believed this should not have gone ahead without a second UN resolution. She had previously served as PPS to George Foulkes, Minister of State at the Scotland Office and to his predecessor in that post, Brian Wilson. She has served as Chair of the Scottish Group of Labour MPs and member of the Scottish Executive of the Labour Party. She has served as Chair of the All Party Group on Meningitis. She was a member of the Kerley Committee on the Renewal of Local Democracy, providing a minority report opposing proportional representation.

In June 2004, Osborne was selected as the Labour candidate for the new constituency of Ayr, Carrick and Cumnock, where she was returned at the 2005 general election with a majority of 9,997 votes. She served on the Foreign Affairs Select Committee from 2005 to 2010. She was also Secretary of the All Party Group on Colombia and the Women, Peace and Security Group. In 2006, then-Prime Minister Tony Blair appointed her as a member of the UK Delegation to the Parliamentary Assembly of the Organization for Security and Co-operation in Europe (OSCE).

On 6 May 2010, Osborne was re-elected as MP for Ayr, Carrick and Cumnock with a majority of 9,911 votes. In 2010, she was elected Vice Chair of Labour's backbench Foreign Affairs Committee and Chair of the All Party Equalities Group. In October 2010, she was appointed to the Defence Select Committee and the Council of Europe. In 2011, she was a member of the special Select Committee set up to scrutinise the Bill that became the Armed Forces Act 2011. In January 2011, the Speaker of the House of Commons appointed her to his Panel of Chairs. She was reappointed to the Foreign Affairs Select Committee in 2013.

== Family ==
Her husband is Alastair Osborne, who was the Labour candidate in the same Ayr constituency in 1992 that Sandra Osborne gained for her party in 1997. The couple have two daughters and two granddaughters and live in Symington, Ayrshire.

Parliament of the United Kingdom
Preceded by Phil Gallie	Member of Parliament for Ayr; 1997–2005	Constituency abolished
New constituency	Member of Parliament for Ayr, Carrick and Cumnock; 2005–2015	Succeeded by Corri Wilson
