= John Scott (MSP) =

Scottish farmer and politician (born 1951)

John Scott OBE
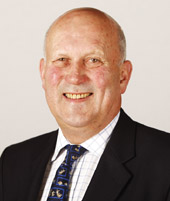
- Official portrait, 2011

Deputy Presiding Officer of the Scottish Parliament
- In office 11 May 2011 – 12 May 2016 Serving with Elaine Smith
- Presiding Officer: Tricia Marwick
- Preceded by: Alasdair Morgan
- Succeeded by: Linda Fabiani

Member of the Scottish Parliament for Ayr
- In office 16 March 2000 – 5 May 2021
- Preceded by: Ian Welsh
- Succeeded by: Siobhian Brown

Personal details
- Born: 7 June 1951 (age 75) Girvan, Scotland
- Party: Scottish Conservatives

William John Graham Scott, OBE (born 7 June 1951) is a Scottish farmer and former Scottish Conservative politician. He was the Member of the Scottish Parliament (MSP) for Ayr from 2000 to 2021.

== Background ==
Born in Girvan, Scott was educated at Barrhill Primary in South Ayrshire and George Watson's College in Edinburgh. He has a Bachelor of Science degree for Civil Engineering from the University of Edinburgh.

Scott played for the Wigtownshire Rugby Club from 1969 to 1973, a hobby he enjoys to this day.

Scott established the Ayrshire Farmers Market in 1999 and founded the Scottish Association for Farmers in 2001. He tends to his farm in Balkissock outside of Ballantrae in South Ayrshire, whilst also owning a flat in the town of Ayr.

== Political career ==
Scott stood as the Conservative candidate for Carrick, Cumnock and Doon Valley at the 1999 Scottish Parliament election, finishing third behind Labour and the Scottish National Party with 8,123 votes (19.8%).

=== Member of the Scottish Parliament ===
He has served as constituency MSP for Ayr since winning the constituency in a by-election in 2000. He was returned to Parliament at the 2003 Scottish Parliamentary election and again, with an increased majority, at the 2007 Scottish Parliamentary election. At the 2011 and 2016 elections he retained the constituency with a reduced majority, despite seeing his vote increase by 3,564 between 2007 and 2016.

Scott declared his support for Ruth Davidson in the Scottish Conservative leader election. On 11 May 2011, he was elected by MSPs to serve as one of the two Deputy Presiding Officers of the Scottish Parliament. He served until 2016 when he was unsuccessful in his attempt to become Presiding Officer.

Scott was the Scottish Conservative spokesperson for sustainable development between 2016 and 2021, having previously served as spokesperson for the environment from 2001 until 2003 and as spokesperson on rural affairs from 2007 until 2011. He was appointed as the convener of the Delegated Powers and Law Reform Committee of the Scottish Parliament in June 2016.

In 2021, he narrowly lost his seat to the Scottish National Party's Siobhian Brown, trailing her by 170 votes (0.4%). Scott was not among the Conservatives to seek election on the South Scotland list, which saw the party gain another regional MSP after losing their constituency seat.

== Other activity ==
Scott was appointed Officer of the Order of the British Empire (OBE) in the 2022 New Year Honours for political and public service.

== Controversy ==
Scott came under fire after it emerged that he profited from wind energy investments – despite his party having previously opposed the development of such projects. The Register of Interests for Mr Scott states: "From 6 March 2009 part of the Farm’s income comes from a contract with CRE Energy Ltd to provide access over the farm for the purpose of building and maintaining a windfarm".

Scottish Parliament
Preceded by Ian Welsh	Member of the Scottish Parliament for Ayr; 2000–2021	Succeeded by Siobhian Brown
