= Phil Gallie =

Scottish Conservative politician (1939–2011)

Member of the Scottish Parliament for South of Scotland (1 of 7 Regional MSPs)
- In office 6 May 1999 – 2 April 2007

Member of Parliament for Ayr
- In office 9 April 1992 – 8 April 1997
- Preceded by: George Younger
- Succeeded by: Sandra Osborne

Personal details
- Born: 3 June 1939 Portsmouth, England
- Died: 24 January 2011 (aged 71) Ayr, Scotland
- Party: Scottish Conservative Party

Philip Roy Gallie (3 June 1939 – 24 January 2011) was a British Conservative Party politician. He served in the British House of Commons as the Member of Parliament (MP) for Ayr from 1992 to 1997, and then as a Member of the Scottish Parliament (MSP) for the South of Scotland region from 1999 to 2007. He also held prominent offices within the Scottish Conservative Party.

== Early life ==
Gallie was born in Portsmouth, Hampshire and was educated at Dunfermline High School in Fife. He trained as an electrical fitter before joining the CEGB as a planning engineer. He rose to be a station manager before entering politics. His political career began with being elected as a local councillor on Cunninghame district council, which covered northern Ayrshire and the Isle of Arran.

== Parliamentary career ==
Gallie did not find success in his first two candidacies for Parliament. In 1983 he was beaten by Labour's David Lambie, and in 1987 he was defeated by Dick Douglas. He was elected as Member of Parliament at Westminster for the Ayr constituency in the 1992 general election. He lost his seat, along with all other Conservatives in Scotland, at the 1997 general election.

A vice-chairman of the Scottish Conservative Party, he was elected to the Scottish Parliament in 1999. Gallie was elected to represent the South of Scotland area as a list member, having narrowly failed to win the Ayr constituency seat by 25 votes. Gallie again stood unsuccessfully for the Ayr Westminster seat in 2001, but was re-elected in the 2003 Scottish Parliament election, again as a list member.

He later stood for the leadership of the Conservative group in the Scottish Parliament, but lost to David McLetchie, and instead became the Scottish Conservative's spokesman on constitutional affairs. He did not stand for re-election in 2007, intending to focus on his ambition of becoming a Member of the European Parliament.

Gallie was initially selected to contest the 2010 United Kingdom general election in the Central Ayrshire constituency, but Maurice Golden was eventually chosen as the election was not held until May 2010. Gallie was still active in politics when he unexpectedly died at his home in Ayr, on 24 January 2011, at the age of 71.

Parliament of the United Kingdom
Preceded by George Younger	Member of Parliament for Ayr; 1992–1997	Succeeded by Sandra Osborne
