= David Simpson =

David Simpson or Dave Simpson may refer to:

== Arts and media ==
- David Simpson (artist) (born 1928), American artist
- Dana Simpson (David Craig Simpson, born 1977), American cartoonist

== Politics ==
- David Simpson (Canadian politician) (1910–1965), Canadian politician
- David Simpson (Northern Ireland politician) (born 1959), Democratic Unionist Party politician in Northern Ireland
- David Simpson (Texas politician) (born 1961), Texas Representative

== Religion ==
- David Simpson (priest) (1745–1799), English priest
- David Capell Simpson (1883–1955), British biblical scholar, academic and Church of England clergyman

== Sport ==
- Dave Simpson (ice hockey) (born 1962), Canadian ice hockey player
- David Simpson (Irish cricketer) (born 1983), Irish cricketer
- David Simpson (Scottish cricketer) (born 1961), Scottish cricketer
- David Simpson (footballer, born 1963), Australian rules footballer for Richmond
- David Simpson (footballer, born 1965), Australian rules footballer for Geelong
- Dave Simpson (soccer) (born 1983), Canadian soccer player

== Other people ==
- David Alan Simpson (born 1955), English botanist
- David F. Simpson (1860–1925), American jurist
- David Simpson (mayor) (1860–1931), English builder, contractor, and property developer
