= List of listed buildings in Ayr, South Ayrshire =

This is a list of listed buildings in the parish of Ayr in South Ayrshire, Scotland.

== List ==
Name	Location	Date Listed	Grid Ref. (Note: Sometimes known as OSGB36, the grid reference (where provided) is based on the British national grid reference system used by the Ordnance Survey. • "Guide to National Grid". Ordnance Survey. • "Get-a-map". Ordnance Survey.)	Geo-coordinates	Notes	LB Number (Note: Historic Environment Scotland assign a unique alphanumeric identifier to each designated site in Scotland, for listed buildings this always begins with "LB", for example "LB12345".)	Image
1-17 (Odd Nos) Queen's Terrace Including Boundary Walls And Railings				55°27′44″N 4°38′25″W	Category B	21724	Upload another image
19-33 (Odd Nos) Queen's Terrace Including Boundary Walls And Railings				55°27′48″N 4°38′25″W	Category B	21725	Upload Photo
1 And 3 Racecourse Road Including Gatepiers And Boundary Wall				55°27′30″N 4°38′05″W	Category B	21728	Upload Photo
19 Racecourse Road, Pickwick Hotel Including Gatepiers And Boundary Wall				55°27′20″N 4°38′08″W	Category C(S)	21737	Upload Photo
36 Racecourse Road Including Gatepiers And Boundary Wall				55°27′11″N 4°38′17″W	Category B	21746	Upload Photo
94-104 (Even Nos) Midton Road, The Knowe Including Gatepiers And Boundary Wall				55°26′57″N 4°37′57″W	Category B	21757	Upload Photo
2 And 4 River Terrace				55°27′54″N 4°37′44″W	Category B	21761	Upload another image
14 And 16 Rosebank Crescent, Rosebank House Including Boundary Wall				55°27′00″N 4°37′50″W	Category B	21762	Upload Photo
2, 4A-4D, 6A-6D, 8A-8D, 10A-10D St Leonard's Wynd (Former School)				55°26′57″N 4°37′35″W	Category C(S)	21768	Upload Photo
67-71 (Odd Nos) Sandgate				55°27′45″N 4°38′02″W	Category C(S)	21781	Upload Photo
112 And 114 High Street And 1 Kirk Port				55°27′47″N 4°37′47″W	Category B	21627	Upload Photo
128 And 130 High Street				55°27′46″N 4°37′47″W	Category B	21630	Upload Photo
172-176 (Even Nos) High Street And 1-7 (Odd Nos) Mill Street, Wallace Tower				55°27′42″N 4°37′45″W	Category B	21636	Upload another image
Main Street, Newton Tower Including Gates				55°28′01″N 4°37′48″W	Category B	21659	Upload another image
Main Street, Newton Cross				55°27′57″N 4°37′50″W	Category B	21660	Upload another image
56 Midton Road, Normanhurst Including Gatepiers And Boundary Wall				55°27′04″N 4°37′57″W	Category C(S)	21672	Upload Photo
25 And 27 Miller Road Including Boundary Wall				55°27′29″N 4°37′59″W	Category C(S)	21675	Upload Photo
10-24 (Even Nos) Miller Road Including Gatepiers, Gates, Railings And Boundary Wall				55°27′30″N 4°37′50″W	Category B	21680	Upload Photo
22 Mount Charles Crescent Including Boundary Wall				55°26′03″N 4°38′46″W	Category C(S)	21686	Upload Photo
53 Greenfield Avenue, The Lodge Including Gatepiers, Railings And Boundary Wall				55°26′12″N 4°38′44″W	Category B	21687	Upload Photo
13-17 (Odd Nos) New Bridge Street				55°27′53″N 4°37′54″W	Category C(S)	21691	Upload Photo
12 And 14 New Bridge Street				55°27′53″N 4°37′57″W	Category B	21695	Upload Photo
40 And 42 Newmarket Street				55°27′15″N 4°37′52″W	Category C(S)	21716	Upload Photo
21 And 23 Park Circus Including Gatepiers, Gates, Railings And Boundary Wall				55°27′26″N 4°37′58″W	Category C(S)	21719	Upload Photo
1-8A (Inclusive Nos) Park Terrace Including Boundary Walls, Gatepiers, Gates And Railings				55°27′36″N 4°38′12″W	Category C(S)	21723	Upload Photo
16 And 18 Cathcart Street				55°27′50″N 4°38′03″W	Category C(S)	21532	Upload Photo
Chapelpark Road (Se Corner), Circular Armorial Panel Including Boundary Wall				55°26′41″N 4°37′46″W	Category C(S)	21535	Upload Photo
Ailsa Place, Arran Terrace, Bruce Crescent (Rear), Citadel Lane, Mountgomerie Terrace (Rear) And South Harbour Street, Citadel Fortifications Including Miller's Folly				55°27′53″N 4°38′21″W	Category B	21547	Upload Photo
5 And 7 Citadel Place Including Gates				55°27′49″N 4°38′08″W	Category B	21550	Upload Photo
19-25 (Odd Nos) Citadel Place Including Boundary Wall, Gatepiers And Railings				55°27′49″N 4°38′10″W	Category C(S)	21552	Upload Photo
27-39 (Odd Nos) Dalblair Road				55°27′34″N 4°37′53″W	Category C(S)	21561	Upload Photo
Doonholm Road, Doonholm Estate, North Lodge Including Gatepiers, Railings And Boundary Wall				55°25′38″N 4°37′35″W	Category C(S)	21571	Upload Photo
1-27 (Inclusive Nos) Eglinton Terrace Including Boundary Walls, Gatepiers, Railings And Gates				55°27′50″N 4°38′16″W	Category B	21573	Upload Photo
Esplanade, Steven Memorial Fountain				55°27′41″N 4°38′28″W	Category B	21574	Upload another image
62-74 (Even Nos) Fort Street And 2-10 (Even Nos) Fullarton Street, Wellington Chambers				55°27′42″N 4°38′05″W	Category B	21584	Upload Photo
4-16 (Even Nos) And 20 George Street				55°27′54″N 4°37′42″W	Category C(S)	21588	Upload Photo
123 High Street				55°27′45″N 4°37′49″W	Category B	21610	Upload Photo
Alloway, Alloway Public Halls Including Gatepiers, Gate And Boundary Wall				55°25′57″N 4°38′00″W	Category B	21473	Upload Photo
High Maybole Road, Doonside Lodge Including Gatepiers, Gates, Railings And Boundary Wall				55°25′32″N 4°38′19″W	Category C(S)	21482	Upload Photo
Alloway, Railway Bridge Over River Doon				55°25′40″N 4°38′21″W	Category C(S)	21487	Upload Photo
10-14 (Inclusive Nos) Alloway Place Including Boundary Walls				55°27′31″N 4°38′08″W	Category B	21490	Upload Photo
2 Barns Street				55°27′39″N 4°38′04″W	Category B	21502	Upload Photo
1-14 (Inclusive Nos) Barns Terrace Including Boundary Wall And Gatepiers				55°27′32″N 4°38′05″W	Category B	21503	Upload Photo
1-7 (Odd Nos) Burns Statue Square				55°27′31″N 4°37′43″W	Category B	21517	Upload Photo
10, 10A, 12, 14, 16, 16A, 18 And 20 Carrick Avenue				55°27′07″N 4°37′50″W	Category C(S)	21521	Upload Photo
Auchincruive Estate, Gibbsyard (Former Stables)				55°28′42″N 4°33′45″W	Category B	995	Upload Photo
Auchincruive Estate, Walled Garden, Including Greenhouses And Ancillary Structures				55°28′49″N 4°32′51″W	Category B	998	Upload Photo
Auchincruive Estate, Wilson Hall				55°28′47″N 4°33′50″W	Category C(S)	47006	Upload Photo
Alloway, Burns Cottage, Burns Museum				55°25′59″N 4°38′00″W	Category C(S)	47134	Upload Photo
19 And 21 Barns Street				55°27′38″N 4°38′00″W	Category B	47141	Upload Photo
23 And 25 Barns Street Including Railings				55°27′38″N 4°37′59″W	Category B	47142	Upload Photo
4 Barns Street				55°27′39″N 4°38′04″W	Category B	47144	Upload Photo
6 Barns Street				55°27′39″N 4°38′03″W	Category B	47145	Upload Photo
16 Barns Street And 32 Fullarton Street				55°27′39″N 4°37′59″W	Category B	47159	Upload Photo
22 And 24 Barns Street				55°27′39″N 4°37′57″W	Category C(S)	47162	Upload Photo
12 And 14 Cassilis Street Including Railings And Gate				55°27′44″N 4°38′16″W	Category B	47168	Upload Photo
6 And 8 Cromwell Road				55°27′47″N 4°38′19″W	Category C(S)	47173	Upload Photo
22 And 24 Fullarton Street				55°27′41″N 4°38′02″W	Category C(S)	47187	Upload Photo
Greenfield Avenue (Off), Alloway Mill Cottage				55°25′59″N 4°39′00″W	Category C(S)	47189	Upload Photo
Railway Viaduct Over River Ayr, To Nw Of Victoria Bridge				55°27′38″N 4°37′24″W	Category C(S)	47231	Upload Photo
40-46 (Even Nos) Smith Street				55°27′30″N 4°37′39″W	Category C(S)	47239	Upload Photo
5 And 6 Wellington Square Including Railings And Gates				55°27′42″N 4°38′10″W	Category B	47244	Upload Photo
11 Wellington Square Including Railings And Gate				55°27′42″N 4°38′13″W	Category B	47248	Upload Photo
17 Wellington Square				55°27′39″N 4°38′14″W	Category C(S)	47251	Upload Photo
18 Wellington Square				55°27′39″N 4°38′14″W	Category B	47252	Upload Photo
24 Wellington Square				55°27′39″N 4°38′13″W	Category B	47258	Upload Photo
Auchincruive Estate, Dairy Research Department				55°28′42″N 4°33′35″W	Category C(S)	50014	Upload Photo
35 Racecourse Road, Including Gatepiers And Boundary Wall				55°27′10″N 4°38′13″W	Category B	21739	Upload Photo
38 Racecourse Road, Blair Lodge Including Gatepiers And Boundary Wall				55°27′11″N 4°38′18″W	Category C(S)	21747	Upload Photo
4 Racecourse View And 73 Midton Road Including Gatepiers And Boundary Wall				55°26′58″N 4°38′05″W	Category B	21756	Upload Photo
Racecourse View, Shalimar And Shalimar Wing Including Gatepiers And Boundary Wall				55°26′45″N 4°38′00″W	Category B	21758	Upload Photo
Racecourse View, Hartley House Including Former Stable, Gatepiers And Boundary Wall				55°26′44″N 4°38′00″W	Category B	21759	Upload Photo
King Street, Monument To John Taylor Including Railings And Boundary Wall				55°28′02″N 4°37′18″W	Category C(S)	21765	Upload Photo
St Leonard's Road, St Leonard's Parish Church (Church Of Scotland) And Hall Including Lamp Standards, Postbox And Boundary Wall				55°27′00″N 4°37′44″W	Category B	21767	Upload Photo
1 And 1A Seabank Road Including Boundary Wall, Gatepiers And Railings				55°27′54″N 4°38′21″W	Category C(S)	21797	Upload Photo
Turner's Bridge (Footbridge) Over River Ayr				55°27′45″N 4°37′35″W	Category C(S)	21809	Upload Photo
16 Wellington Square				55°27′39″N 4°38′15″W	Category C(S)	21816	Upload Photo
26 Wellington Square				55°27′40″N 4°38′05″W	Category C(S)	21818	Upload Photo
2 Westfield Road, Wellington School Including Gatepiers, Gates, Railings And Boundary Wall				55°27′13″N 4°38′29″W	Category B	21824	Upload Photo
54 High Street And 1 Old Bridge Street				55°27′51″N 4°37′50″W	Category B	21621	Upload Photo
148-156 (Even Nos) High Street				55°27′44″N 4°37′46″W	Category B	21633	Upload Photo
30 And 32 Midton Road Including Gatepiers, Railings And Boundary Wall				55°27′11″N 4°37′53″W	Category C(S)	21669	Upload Photo
1-5 (Odd Nos) Miller Road Including Gatepiers And Boundary Wall				55°27′28″N 4°37′48″W	Category B	21673	Upload Photo
7 And 9 Miller Road Including Boundary Wall				55°27′28″N 4°37′49″W	Category C(S)	21674	Upload Photo
33-43 (Odd Nos) Miller Road Including Gatepiers, Railings And Boundary Wall				55°27′29″N 4°38′02″W	Category C(S)	21677	Upload Photo
1 And 3 New Bridge Street				55°27′54″N 4°37′53″W	Category A	21689	Upload Photo
21-25 (Odd Nos) Newmarket Street				55°27′47″N 4°37′53″W	Category C(S)	21706	Upload Photo
41 And 43 Newmarket Street				55°27′47″N 4°37′55″W	Category C(S)	21708	Upload Photo
4 Newmarket Street				55°27′48″N 4°37′50″W	Category C(S)	21711	Upload Photo
18-22 (Even Nos) Newmarket Street				55°27′48″N 4°37′52″W	Category C(S)	21714	Upload Photo
Carrick Street, Gaiety Theatre				55°27′41″N 4°37′54″W	Category B	21522	Upload Photo
7 And 9 Cathcart Street				55°27′50″N 4°38′01″W	Category C(S)	21528	Upload Photo
8 Cathcart Street				55°27′50″N 4°38′02″W	Category C(S)	21530	Upload Photo
3 Charlotte Street And 45B Fort Street				55°27′45″N 4°38′08″W	Category C(S)	21536	Upload Photo
9 Charlotte Street, Shangri-La				55°27′45″N 4°38′10″W	Category C(S)	21539	Upload Photo
8-12 (Even Nos) Citadel Place And 1 Montgomerie Terrace Including Boundary Walls, Gatepiers And Railings				55°27′50″N 4°38′09″W	Category C(S)	21553	Upload Photo
17-25 (Odd Nos) Dalblair Road Including Boundary Wall				55°27′35″N 4°37′53″W	Category C(S)	21560	Upload Photo
16, 16A And 16B Ewenfield Road Including Sundial, Gatepiers, Gates And Boundary Wall				55°26′39″N 4°37′34″W	Category B	21576	Upload Photo
George Street, Ayr (Martyrs) Free Church And Hall Including Gatepiers, Gates, Railings And Boundary Wall				55°27′54″N 4°37′40″W	Category C(S)	21589	Upload Photo
35-39 (Odd Nos) High Street				55°27′50″N 4°37′51″W	Category C(S)	21596	Upload Photo
71 And 73 High Street				55°27′48″N 4°37′50″W	Category C(S)	21602	Upload Photo
85 And 87 High Street				55°27′47″N 4°37′51″W	Category C(S)	21605	Upload Photo
211-217 (Odd Nos) High Street				55°27′39″N 4°37′45″W	Category C(S)	21613	Upload Photo
16 And 18 Academy Street				55°27′52″N 4°38′00″W	Category C(S)	21468	Upload Photo
Alloway, Alloway Kirk Graveyard Including Hughes Mausoleum, Gatepiers, Gates And Boundary Wall				55°25′40″N 4°38′15″W	Category B	21471	Upload Photo
Alloway (Off), Brig O'Doon				55°25′33″N 4°38′12″W	Category A	21474	Upload another image
6, 6A And 8 Barns Crescent Including Boundary Wall				55°27′33″N 4°38′02″W	Category C(S)	21497	Upload Photo
1-4 (Inclusive Nos) Barns Park Including Gatepiers, Railings And Boundary Wall				55°27′36″N 4°38′03″W	Category B	21498	Upload Photo
3 Barns Street Including Railings				55°27′38″N 4°38′03″W	Category B	21500	Upload Photo
7 Barns Street Including Railings				55°27′38″N 4°38′02″W	Category B	21501	Upload Photo
17-23 (Odd Nos) Burns Statue Square				55°27′30″N 4°37′42″W	Category C(S)	21519	Upload Photo
1-7 (Odd Nos) Carrick Avenue And 44 Midton Road Including Railings And Boundary Wall				55°27′09″N 4°37′55″W	Category C(S)	21520	Upload Photo
Auchincruive Estate, East Lodge				55°28′56″N 4°32′56″W	Category B	997	Upload Photo
2 Academy Street Lane				55°27′51″N 4°37′59″W	Category C(S)	47131	Upload Photo
21-31 (Odd Nos) Alloway Including Railings And Boundary Wall				55°25′59″N 4°37′58″W	Category C(S)	47132	Upload Photo
18 Barns Street				55°27′39″N 4°37′58″W	Category C(S)	47160	Upload Photo
8 And 10 Cassilis Street Including Railings And Gates				55°27′45″N 4°38′16″W	Category B	47167	Upload Photo
Doonfoot Road, Belleisle Estate, Walled Garden				55°26′17″N 4°38′28″W	Category C(S)	47183	Upload Photo
212-218 (Even Nos) High Street				55°27′40″N 4°37′43″W	Category C(S)	47206	Upload Photo
45-51 (Odd Nos) Newmarket Street				55°27′47″N 4°37′55″W	Category C(S)	47223	Upload Photo
32-38 (Even Nos) Smith Street				55°27′30″N 4°37′38″W	Category C(S)	47238	Upload Photo
48-56 (Even Nos) Smith Street				55°27′30″N 4°37′39″W	Category B	47240	Upload Photo
7 And 8 Wellington Square Including Railings And Gate				55°27′42″N 4°38′10″W	Category B	47245	Upload Photo
21 Wellington Square Including Railings				55°27′39″N 4°38′11″W	Category B	47255	Upload Photo
54 And 54A Sandgate				55°27′47″N 4°38′02″W	Category C(S)	47576	Upload Photo
St Quivox, St Quivox Parish Church (Church Of Scotland)				55°29′00″N 4°34′22″W	Category A	48638	Upload another image
2 Queen's Terrace And 18 Bath Place Including Boundary Wall				55°27′42″N 4°38′24″W	Category B	21726	Upload Photo
8-16 (Even Nos) Queen's Terrace				55°27′44″N 4°38′24″W	Category C(S)	21727	Upload Photo
5 Racecourse Road, Meteor Hotel Including Railings And Boundary Wall				55°27′28″N 4°38′06″W	Category C(S)	21729	Upload Photo
46 Racecourse Road Including Boundary Wall				55°27′05″N 4°38′20″W	Category B	21751	Upload Photo
1 Racecourse View, Hartfield House Including Gatepiers And Boundary Wall				55°27′01″N 4°38′18″W	Category B	21753	Upload Photo
Monument Road (Off), Rozelle Estate, Rozelle Including Lamp Standards				55°26′11″N 4°37′43″W	Category A	21763	Upload Photo
14 Sandgate				55°27′50″N 4°37′59″W	Category B	21785	Upload Photo
22 Sandgate And 2 And 4 Cathcart Street				55°27′50″N 4°38′00″W	Category A	21788	Upload another image
58A Sandgate, Former Sandgate Church And Church Hall, Including Gatepiers, Gates, Railings And Boundary Wall				55°27′46″N 4°38′04″W	Category B	21794	Upload Photo
3 Savoy Park, Savoy Croft Including Sundial, Gatepiers, Gates And Boundary Wall				55°27′22″N 4°38′18″W	Category A	21795	Upload Photo
1 Wellington Square Including Railings And Gate				55°27′42″N 4°38′09″W	Category B	21815	Upload Photo
25 Wellington Square				55°27′39″N 4°38′07″W	Category B	21817	Upload Photo
1 Wheatfield Road, Wheatfield House Including Walled Garden, Sundial, Gatepiers, Gates, Railings And Boundary Wall				55°27′17″N 4°38′17″W	Category B	21825	Upload Photo
219-223 (Odd Nos) High Street				55°27′39″N 4°37′45″W	Category C(S)	21615	Upload Photo
225-231 (Odd Nos) High Street				55°27′38″N 4°37′44″W	Category C(S)	21616	Upload Photo
120 And 122 High Street				55°27′46″N 4°37′47″W	Category C(S)	21629	Upload Photo
Holmston Road, Council Offices (Former Holmston House Hospital)				55°27′29″N 4°37′25″W	Category B	21642	Upload Photo
28 And 30 John Street Including Gatepiers And Boundary Wall				55°27′50″N 4°37′33″W	Category C(S)	21649	Upload Photo
10 And 12 Kirk Port				55°27′47″N 4°37′46″W	Category C(S)	21651	Upload Photo
12 And 14 Main Street, Carnegie Public Library Including Railings, Gates And Boundary Wall				55°27′58″N 4°37′48″W	Category B	21657	Upload another image
29 Midton Road, Elgin House Including Gatepiers And Boundary Wall				55°27′13″N 4°37′52″W	Category C(S)	21664	Upload Photo
59 And 61 Midton Road Including Gatepiers, Gates And Boundary Wall				55°27′04″N 4°38′00″W	Category C(S)	21666	Upload Photo
65, 65A Midton Road And 13 Victoria Park Including Gatepiers, Gates, Railings And Boundary Wall				55°27′02″N 4°38′02″W	Category B	21668	Upload Photo
34 And 36 Midton Road Including Gatepiers, Railings And Boundary Wall				55°27′10″N 4°37′53″W	Category C(S)	21670	Upload Photo
4 And 6 Miller Road Including Railings And Boundary Wall				55°27′29″N 4°37′48″W	Category B	21678	Upload Photo
26 And 28 Miller Road Including Boundary Wall				55°27′30″N 4°37′53″W	Category B	21681	Upload Photo
Mount Charles Crescent, Mount Charles				55°25′59″N 4°38′43″W	Category B	21685	Upload Photo
New Bridge Over River Ayr Including Lamp Standards				55°27′55″N 4°37′53″W	Category B	21688	Upload another image
8 And 10 New Bridge Street				55°27′53″N 4°37′55″W	Category B	21694	Upload Photo
28 And 30 New Bridge Street				55°27′52″N 4°37′57″W	Category C(S)	21698	Upload Photo
34 New Bridge Street And 2, 2A Academy Street Including Boundary Wall				55°27′51″N 4°37′58″W	Category A	21700	Upload Photo
12 Newmarket Street				55°27′48″N 4°37′51″W	Category C(S)	21713	Upload Photo
30-38 (Even Nos) Newmarket Street				55°27′48″N 4°37′54″W	Category C(S)	21715	Upload Photo
17 Cathcart Street, Flats A-N, (Former Relief Church) Including Boundary Wall And Gatepiers				55°27′51″N 4°37′58″W	Category B	21534	Upload Photo
11 Charlotte Street				55°27′45″N 4°38′11″W	Category B	21540	Upload Photo
Citadel Lane (Rear Of 2 Montgomerie Terrace), Citadel Gate				55°27′51″N 4°38′09″W	Category B	21548	Upload Photo
36-40 (Even Nos) Dalblair Road Including Boundary Wall				55°27′33″N 4°37′55″W	Category C(S)	21564	Upload Photo
Esplanade, Ayr Pavilion Including Boundary Walls				55°27′38″N 4°38′25″W	Category B	21575	Upload another image
Fullarton Street, Holy Trinity Church (Scottish Episcopal) Including Church Hall, Gatepiers, Gates, Railings And Boundary Wall				55°27′41″N 4°37′59″W	Category A	21586	Upload another image
25 Greenfield Avenue Including Gatepiers, Railings And Boundary Wall				55°26′04″N 4°38′26″W	Category C(S)	21591	Upload Photo
11-15 (Odd Nos) High Street				55°27′51″N 4°37′54″W	Category B	21593	Upload Photo
17-21 (Odd Nos) High Street				55°27′50″N 4°37′53″W	Category B	21594	Upload Photo
47 And 49 High Street				55°27′50″N 4°37′51″W	Category C(S)	21597	Upload Photo
55-59 (Odd Nos) High Street				55°27′49″N 4°37′50″W	Category B	21600	Upload Photo
93 And 95 High Street				55°27′46″N 4°37′50″W	Category C(S)	21607	Upload Photo
Alloway, Brig O'Doon House				55°25′37″N 4°38′14″W	Category C(S)	21479	Upload Photo
Alloway (Off), Dutch Mill House				55°25′31″N 4°38′03″W	Category C(S)	21483	Upload Photo
1-5A (Inclusive Nos) Alloway Place Including Boundary Walls				55°27′35″N 4°38′08″W	Category B	21488	Upload Photo
Doonfoot Road, Belleisle Estate, South Lodge Including Gatepiers And Boundary Wall				55°26′27″N 4°38′31″W	Category C(S)	21507	Upload Photo
65 Bellevue Crescent, Kensal Tower Including Boundary Wall				55°27′21″N 4°38′09″W	Category C(S)	21509	Upload Photo
9-15 (Odd Nos) Burns Statue Square				55°27′31″N 4°37′42″W	Category B	21518	Upload Photo
Auchincruive Estate, Ice House				55°28′47″N 4°33′20″W	Category C(S)	4873	Upload Photo
Doonholm Estate, Stables, Including Ancillary Structures And Loupin'-On Stane				55°25′24″N 4°37′36″W	Category C(S)	4874	Upload Photo
Shaw Monument				55°30′06″N 4°35′09″W	Category B	994	Upload another image See more images
Auchincruive Estate, Oswald's Temple (Tea House)				55°28′49″N 4°33′42″W	Category A	996	Upload another image
Doonholm Estate, Doonholm, Including Wall And Archway				55°25′22″N 4°37′38″W	Category B	1001	Upload Photo
12 Barns Street				55°27′39″N 4°38′00″W	Category B	47157	Upload Photo
20 Barns Street				55°27′39″N 4°37′58″W	Category C(S)	47161	Upload Photo
26 And 28 Barns Street Including Railings				55°27′39″N 4°37′56″W	Category C(S)	47163	Upload Photo
4 Bath Place, Wellington Lodge, Including Boundary Wall, Gatepiers And Railings				55°27′43″N 4°38′20″W	Category C(S)	47164	Upload Photo
Dalmellington Road, Castlehill Gatepiers, Gates, Railings And Boundary Wall				55°26′54″N 4°36′51″W	Category C(S)	47177	Upload Photo
Damside, Labour Party Offices				55°28′07″N 4°37′44″W	Category C(S)	47180	Upload Photo
Mount Charles Crescent, Mount Charles, Walled Garden				55°25′58″N 4°38′47″W	Category B	47218	Upload Photo
2 Racecourse View, Morrison House Including Ancillary Structures, Walled Garden, Greenhouses, Gatepiers, Gates And Boundary Wall				55°26′59″N 4°38′11″W	Category C(S)	21754	Upload Photo
33 And 35 Sandgate				55°27′49″N 4°37′58″W	Category B	21775	Upload Photo
37 Sandgate				55°27′49″N 4°37′58″W	Category B	21776	Upload Photo
10 And 12 Sandgate				55°27′51″N 4°37′59″W	Category C(S)	21784	Upload Photo
24 Sandgate				55°27′49″N 4°38′00″W	Category C(S)	21789	Upload Photo
7 South Harbour Street				55°27′54″N 4°37′56″W	Category C(S)	21801	Upload Photo
Smith Street, Ayr Station And Station Hotel Including Canopies, Footbridge, Lamp Standards, Gatepiers, Railings And Boundary Wall				55°27′29″N 4°37′34″W	Category B	21808	Upload Photo
3 And 3A Victoria Park Including Gatepiers, Gates And Boundary Wall				55°27′04″N 4°38′15″W	Category C(S)	21811	Upload Photo
27 Wellington Square				55°27′41″N 4°38′05″W	Category B	21819	Upload Photo
3 And 3A Marchmont Road Including Gatepiers And Boundary Wall				55°27′17″N 4°37′55″W	Category C(S)	21661	Upload Photo
63 Midton Road, Brownhill Including Gatepiers And Boundary Wall				55°27′04″N 4°38′01″W	Category B	21667	Upload Photo
32 New Bridge Street				55°27′51″N 4°37′57″W	Category C(S)	21699	Upload Photo
11 And 13 Newmarket Street				55°27′47″N 4°37′52″W	Category C(S)	21705	Upload Photo
53-57 (Odd Nos) Newmarket Street				55°27′47″N 4°37′56″W	Category C(S)	21709	Upload Photo
6-10 (Even Nos) Newmarket Street				55°27′48″N 4°37′51″W	Category C(S)	21712	Upload Photo
17 Charlotte Street				55°27′45″N 4°38′13″W	Category B	21543	Upload Photo
6 And 8 Charlotte Street				55°27′46″N 4°38′07″W	Category C(S)	21546	Upload Photo
77-85 (Odd Nos) Dalblair Road And 54-62 (Even Nos) Alloway Street				55°27′32″N 4°37′45″W	Category B	21563	Upload Photo
Doonfoot Road, Former Seafield Hospital				55°26′54″N 4°38′28″W	Category B	21565	Upload Photo
8 Dunure Road, The Balgarth Including Boundary Wall				55°26′08″N 4°39′00″W	Category C(S)	21572	Upload Photo
52 And 54 Fort Street				55°27′45″N 4°38′06″W	Category B	21581	Upload Photo
2 George Street				55°27′54″N 4°37′43″W	Category C(S)	21587	Upload Photo
George Street, Former Morrison Congregational Church Including Gate And Railings				55°27′56″N 4°37′33″W	Category C(S)	21590	Upload Photo
Ayr Harbour Including North, South And Compass Piers, North Breakwater, Harbour Walls, Griffin Dock And Lighthouses				55°28′07″N 4°38′25″W	Category B	21592	Upload another image
23 And 25 High Street				55°27′50″N 4°37′53″W	Category B	21595	Upload Photo
77-81 (Odd Nos) High Street And 1 Newmarket Street				55°27′47″N 4°37′50″W	Category B	21604	Upload Photo
9 And 11 Academy Street				55°27′51″N 4°38′00″W	Category C(S)	21466	Upload Photo
Brigend Castle				55°25′29″N 4°38′04″W	Category C(S)	21475	Upload Photo
Alloway, Burns Monument, Statue House				55°25′36″N 4°38′12″W	Category B	21478	Upload Photo
38 And 40 Alloway, Doonbrae Cottage And Doonbrae House Including Garage, Grotto, Railings And Boundary Wall				55°25′39″N 4°38′15″W	Category B	21480	Upload Photo
Greenfield Avenue (Off), Alloway Mill And Ancillary Structure Including Entrance Boundary Wall				55°25′59″N 4°38′58″W	Category B	21484	Upload Photo
Alloway, Monument Cottage Including Gates, Gatepiers, Railings, Drinking Fountain And Boundary Wall				55°25′39″N 4°38′13″W	Category B	21485	Upload Photo
1 Barns Crescent, Barns House Including Ancillary Structures, Walled Garden, Gatepiers, Gates And Boundary Wall				55°27′35″N 4°38′00″W	Category A	21496	Upload Photo
4 Broomfield Road, Broomfield Lodge Including Gatepiers, Gate And Boundary Wall				55°27′05″N 4°37′54″W	Category C(S)	21510	Upload Photo
St Quivox, St Quivox Parish Church, Graveyard Including Gatepiers, Gates, Railings And Boundary Wall				55°29′00″N 4°34′21″W	Category B	47010	Upload Photo
St Quivox, St Quivox Parish Church, Mausoleum				55°28′59″N 4°34′21″W	Category A	47011	Upload another image
15 And 17 Barns Street Including Railings				55°27′38″N 4°38′01″W	Category B	47140	Upload Photo
27 And 29 Barns Street Including Railings				55°27′38″N 4°37′57″W	Category B	47143	Upload Photo
8 Barns Street				55°27′39″N 4°38′02″W	Category B	47146	Upload Photo
59 Castlehill Road Including Gatepiers, Gate And Boundary Wall				55°27′09″N 4°37′18″W	Category C(S)	47169	Upload Photo
49-53 (Odd Nos) Dalblair Road				55°27′32″N 4°37′51″W	Category C(S)	47174	Upload Photo
Dalmilling Crescent, Cathedral Of The Good Shepherd (Roman Catholic) Including Gatepiers, Gates, Railings And Boundary Wall				55°28′12″N 4°35′57″W	Category C(S)	47178	Upload Photo
Doonfoot Road, Belleisle Estate, Greenhouse				55°26′19″N 4°38′24″W	Category B	47181	Upload Photo
18 Ewenfield Road, Fenwick Lodge Including Gatepiers And Boundary Wall				55°26′38″N 4°37′28″W	Category C(S)	47185	Upload Photo
155, 157 High Street And 2, 4 Carrick Street				55°27′43″N 4°37′47″W	Category B	47200	Upload Photo
28 Maybole Road Including Ancillary Structures				55°26′33″N 4°37′18″W	Category C(S)	47210	Upload Photo
10 And 12 Midton Road Including Gatepiers, Railings And Boundary Wall				55°27′16″N 4°37′49″W	Category C(S)	47211	Upload Photo
58 Midton Road, Midton Cottage Including Gatepiers And Boundary Wall				55°27′03″N 4°37′57″W	Category C(S)	47212	Upload Photo
24 Racecourse Road, Derclach Including Sundial, Gatepiers, Gates And Boundary Wall				55°27′18″N 4°38′14″W	Category C(S)	47230	Upload Photo
10 Wellington Square Including Railings And Gate				55°27′42″N 4°38′12″W	Category B	47247	Upload Photo
22 Wellington Square Including Carriage-House				55°27′38″N 4°38′10″W	Category B	47256	Upload Photo
Wellington Square, War Memorial				55°27′40″N 4°38′11″W	Category C(S)	47259	Upload Photo
1 South Lodge Court, Flats A-G, Including Boundary Wall				55°27′14″N 4°38′06″W	Category C(S)	21738	Upload Photo
35 Racecourse Road, Former Coach-House				55°27′09″N 4°38′13″W	Category B	21740	Upload Photo
41 Sandgate, Queen's Court Centre, Including Lamp Standards, Railings And Boundary Wall				55°27′47″N 4°37′59″W	Category B	21778	Upload Photo
16 And 18 Sandgate				55°27′50″N 4°37′59″W	Category C(S)	21786	Upload Photo
5 Savoy Park, Wellsbourne House Including Gatepiers And Boundary Wall				55°27′21″N 4°38′22″W	Category B	21796	Upload Photo
1-5 (Odd Nos) South Harbour Street				55°27′54″N 4°37′56″W	Category B	21800	Upload Photo
88-98 (Even Nos) High Street				55°27′48″N 4°37′48″W	Category B	21623	Upload Photo
116 And 118 High Street				55°27′47″N 4°37′47″W	Category C(S)	21628	Upload Photo
134-142 (Even Nos) High Street				55°27′45″N 4°37′47″W	Category B	21631	Upload Photo
146 High Street				55°27′45″N 4°37′47″W	Category B	21632	Upload Photo
158 And 160 High Street				55°27′44″N 4°37′46″W	Category C(S)	21634	Upload Photo
Old Hillfoot Road 1-10 (Inclusive Numbers), Castlehill Court (Former) Castlestlehill Stables Including Boundary Wall				55°26′57″N 4°36′38″W	Category C(S)	21640	Upload Photo
Holmston Road, Council Offices, (Former Holmston House Hospital) Lodge Including Gatepiers, Gates, Railings And Boundary Wall				55°27′28″N 4°37′23″W	Category C(S)	21643	Upload Photo
14 Kirk Port				55°27′47″N 4°37′46″W	Category C(S)	21652	Upload Photo
54 Midton Road, Clova Lodge And 6 Broomfield Road, Barrcraigs Including Postbox, Gatepiers And Boundary Wall				55°27′06″N 4°37′56″W	Category B	21671	Upload Photo
8 Miller Road				55°27′29″N 4°37′48″W	Category C(S)	21679	Upload Photo
30 And 31 Montgomerie Terrace Including Boundary Walls And Gatepiers				55°27′56″N 4°38′20″W	Category C(S)	21684	Upload Photo
7-11 (Odd Nos) New Bridge Street				55°27′53″N 4°37′54″W	Category B	21690	Upload Photo
6 New Road, Salvation Army Citadel				55°28′08″N 4°37′45″W	Category C(S)	21702	Upload Photo
5-9 (Odd Nos) Newmarket Street				55°27′47″N 4°37′51″W	Category C(S)	21704	Upload Photo
29 Park Circus Including Gatepiers, Gates And Boundary Wall				55°27′26″N 4°37′53″W	Category C(S)	21720	Upload Photo
39 Park Circus, St Andrew's Church (Church Of Scotland) And Church Hall Including Gatepiers And Boundary Wall				55°27′24″N 4°37′49″W	Category B	21722	Upload another image
7 Charlotte Street, Grant House				55°27′45″N 4°38′09″W	Category C(S)	21538	Upload Photo
13 Charlotte Street				55°27′45″N 4°38′11″W	Category C(S)	21541	Upload Photo
2, 4 Charlotte Street And 43 Fort Street				55°27′46″N 4°38′10″W	Category C(S)	21545	Upload Photo
1, 3 Citadel Place And 19 Fort Street				55°27′49″N 4°38′07″W	Category B	21549	Upload Photo
15 And 17 Citadel Place Including Gates And Railings				55°27′49″N 4°38′09″W	Category B	21551	Upload Photo
2 Corsehill Road, The Gables Including Ancillary Structure, Gatepiers, Gates And Boundary Wall				55°26′55″N 4°37′45″W	Category B	21554	Upload Photo
Doonfoot Road, View House Including Gatepiers, Gate And Boundary Wall				55°26′53″N 4°38′22″W	Category C(S)	21568	Upload Photo
Fort Street, Ayr Academy				55°27′52″N 4°38′05″W	Category B	21582	Upload another image
51 High Street				55°27′49″N 4°37′51″W	Category C(S)	21598	Upload Photo
Alloway, Alloway Auld Kirk				55°25′40″N 4°38′15″W	Category A	21470	Upload another image
Alloway, Burns Monument Including Lamp Standards, Sundial, Railings, Gates And Boundary Wall				55°25′37″N 4°38′12″W	Category A	21477	Upload another image
6-9 (Inclusive Nos) Alloway Place Including Boundary Walls And Railings				55°27′34″N 4°38′08″W	Category B	21489	Upload Photo
Auld Brig Over River Ayr, Including Lamp Standards				55°27′52″N 4°37′46″W	Category A	21495	Upload another image See more images
1 Barns Street, Berkeley House, Including Boundary Walls				55°27′38″N 4°38′06″W	Category B	21499	Upload Photo
4 Bruce Crescent Including Boundary Wall And Gatepiers				55°27′47″N 4°38′12″W	Category C(S)	21513	Upload Photo
St Quivox, Mount Hamilton				55°28′59″N 4°34′14″W	Category B	993	Upload Photo
Mount Oliphant				55°25′16″N 4°35′56″W	Category B	999	Upload Photo
Monkwood Bridge Over River Doon				55°24′17″N 4°37′51″W	Category B	1000	Upload Photo
Auchincruive Estate, Oswald Hall				55°28′42″N 4°33′09″W	Category A	99	Upload another image See more images
St Quivox, Former Manse Including Boundary Wall				55°28′58″N 4°34′18″W	Category B	47009	Upload Photo
30 Alloway Street				55°27′35″N 4°37′45″W	Category C(S)	47137	Upload Photo
5 And 5A Barns Street Including Railings				55°27′38″N 4°38′03″W	Category B	47138	Upload Photo
10 Barns Street				55°27′39″N 4°38′01″W	Category B	47156	Upload Photo
18 And 20 Fullarton Street				55°27′41″N 4°38′02″W	Category C(S)	47186	Upload Photo
224 And 226 High Street				55°27′39″N 4°37′43″W	Category C(S)	47207	Upload Photo
2 Kyle Street And 1 And 3 Alloway Street				55°27′36″N 4°37′43″W	Category C(S)	47208	Upload Photo
Monument Road And Racecourse View, Corsehill Walled Garden Including Gatepiers, Gates And Boundary Wall				55°26′48″N 4°37′47″W	Category C(S)	47216	Upload Photo
31-39 (Odd Nos) Newmarket Street				55°27′47″N 4°37′54″W	Category C(S)	47222	Upload Photo
44 And 46 Newmarket Street				55°27′48″N 4°37′55″W	Category C(S)	47224	Upload Photo
4 Wellington Square Including Railings And Gate				55°27′42″N 4°38′09″W	Category B	47243	Upload Photo
12 Wellington Square Including Railings And Gates				55°27′42″N 4°38′13″W	Category B	47249	Upload Photo
Wellington Square, Gatepiers, Gates And Boundary Walls				55°27′41″N 4°38′11″W	Category C(S)	47260	Upload Photo
Craigie, Ayrshire Management Centre, Including Screen Wall				55°27′30″N 4°36′41″W	Category A	21556	Upload another image
9 Racecourse Road And 1 Park Circus Including Gatepiers, Gates And Boundary Wall				55°27′26″N 4°38′06″W	Category B	21732	Upload Photo
16 Racecourse Road, Savoy Park Hotel Including Garden Outhouse, Gatepiers, Gate, Postbox And Boundary Wall				55°27′23″N 4°38′13″W	Category B	21744	Upload Photo
44 Racecourse Road, Gartferry Hotel Including Boundary Wall				55°27′07″N 4°38′20″W	Category B	21750	Upload Photo
Monument Road (Off), Rozelle Estate, Rozelle Lodge, Including Gatepiers And Boundary Wall				55°26′17″N 4°37′51″W	Category B	21764	Upload Photo
Bruce Crescent, St John The Baptist's Tower Including Gatepiers, Gates And Boundary Wall				55°27′49″N 4°38′14″W	Category B	21766	Upload another image See more images
21-25 (Odd Nos) Sandgate				55°27′49″N 4°37′57″W	Category B	21773	Upload Photo
27 And 29 Sandgate				55°27′49″N 4°37′57″W	Category C(S)	21774	Upload Photo
2 And 4 Sandgate And 1 Academy Street				55°27′51″N 4°37′58″W	Category B	21782	Upload Photo
2 And 3 Seabank Road Including Boundary Wall And Gatepiers				55°27′54″N 4°38′22″W	Category C(S)	21798	Upload Photo
9-13 (Odd Nos) South Harbour Street				55°27′54″N 4°37′57″W	Category B	21802	Upload Photo
14 Wellington Square, Sheriff Court				55°27′41″N 4°38′19″W	Category A	21820	Upload another image
237-241 (Odd Nos) High Street				55°27′37″N 4°37′44″W	Category C(S)	21619	Upload Photo
106 And 110 High Street				55°27′48″N 4°37′48″W	Category C(S)	21626	Upload Photo
234 High Street				55°27′39″N 4°37′43″W	Category C(S)	21639	Upload Photo
Holmston Road And Ashgrove Street, Holmston Primary School Including Gatepiers, Gates, Railings And Boundary Wall				55°27′26″N 4°37′25″W	Category C(S)	21645	Upload Photo
Kirk Port, Auld Kirk Of Ayr, Church Of Scotland				55°27′46″N 4°37′43″W	Category A	21653	Upload another image
Kirk Port, Auld Kirk Of Ayr Graveyard Including Boundary Walls And Lamp Standard				55°27′47″N 4°37′43″W	Category B	21655	Upload another image
57 Midton Road, Melling Including Gatepiers And Boundary Wall				55°27′06″N 4°38′00″W	Category C(S)	21665	Upload Photo
32 Miller Road Including Gatepiers And Boundary Wall				55°27′30″N 4°38′00″W	Category C(S)	21683	Upload Photo
2-6 (Even Nos) New Bridge Street				55°27′54″N 4°37′55″W	Category B	21693	Upload Photo
24 And 26 New Bridge Street				55°27′52″N 4°37′57″W	Category B	21697	Upload Photo
50-66 (Even Nos) Newmarket Street				55°27′48″N 4°37′56″W	Category C(S)	21717	Upload Photo
5 Cathcart Street				55°27′50″N 4°38′00″W	Category C(S)	21527	Upload Photo
10, 12, 12A And 14 Cathcart Street				55°27′50″N 4°38′02″W	Category C(S)	21531	Upload Photo
15 Charlotte Street				55°27′45″N 4°38′12″W	Category C(S)	21542	Upload Photo
3 Craigweil Road, Craigweil House Including Gatepiers And Boundary Wall				55°27′18″N 4°38′28″W	Category B	21558	Upload another image
Fort Street, Former Cathcart Church Including Archway, Gatepiers, Gates, Railings And Boundary Wall				55°27′50″N 4°38′06″W	Category B	21583	Upload another image
89 And 91 High Street				55°27′46″N 4°37′51″W	Category C(S)	21606	Upload Photo
97 And 99 High Street				55°27′46″N 4°37′50″W	Category C(S)	21608	Upload Photo
10-14 (Even Nos) Academy Street				55°27′52″N 4°38′00″W	Category C(S)	21467	Upload Photo
20 And 22 Academy Street				55°27′52″N 4°38′01″W	Category C(S)	21469	Upload Photo
1 Doonholm Road Including Gatepiers, Gates And Boundary Wall				55°25′56″N 4°38′01″W	Category C(S)	21481	Upload Photo
57 Doonfoot Road, Belleisle Estate, North Lodge Including Gatepiers, Gates, Railings And Boundary Wall				55°26′37″N 4°38′26″W	Category C(S)	21508	Upload Photo
3 Bruce Crescent Including Boundary Wall And Gatepiers				55°27′48″N 4°38′12″W	Category C(S)	21512	Upload Photo
Burns Statue Square, Monument To Robert Burns Including Railings				55°27′29″N 4°37′43″W	Category B	21515	Upload Photo
Ladykirk Estate, Gate Lodge Including Gates, Gatepiers And Adjoining Walls				55°30′11″N 4°33′17″W	Category B	19475	Upload Photo
St Quivox, Cottar House Including Boundary Wall				55°28′59″N 4°34′22″W	Category C(S)	992	Upload Photo
Auchincruive Estate, Hanging Garden				55°28′40″N 4°33′07″W	Category B	47000	Upload Photo
Auchincruive Estate, West Lodge, Including Boundary Walls				55°28′48″N 4°34′00″W	Category C(S)	47001	Upload Photo
6 Alloway				55°26′01″N 4°37′58″W	Category C(S)	47133	Upload Photo
22-28 (Even Nos) Alloway Street				55°27′35″N 4°37′45″W	Category C(S)	47136	Upload Photo
9 And 11 Barns Street, Town Hotel				55°27′38″N 4°38′01″W	Category B	47139	Upload Photo
Boswell Park, Bingo Hall (Former Ayr Playhouse)				55°27′44″N 4°38′01″W	Category B	47166	Upload Photo
14 Craigie Road Including Gatepiers, Railings And Boundary Wall				55°27′41″N 4°37′10″W	Category C(S)	47171	Upload Photo
Dam Park Stadium, Stand				55°27′32″N 4°37′07″W	Category B	47179	Upload Photo
Doonfoot Road, Belleisle Estate, South Lodge Bridge Crossing Slaphouse Burn				55°26′27″N 4°38′31″W	Category C(S)	47182	Upload Photo
Doonholm Road, Doonholm Estate, Doonholm Farmhouse				55°25′31″N 4°37′11″W	Category C(S)	47184	Upload Photo
15-19 (Odd Nos) Newmarket Street				55°27′47″N 4°37′52″W	Category C(S)	47221	Upload Photo
48 Newmarket Street				55°27′48″N 4°37′56″W	Category C(S)	47225	Upload Photo
17 River Street, Former Mission Hall				55°27′55″N 4°37′45″W	Category C(S)	47232	Upload Photo
2 And 3 Wellington Square Including Railings And Gates				55°27′42″N 4°38′08″W	Category B	47242	Upload Photo
Wellington Square, County Buildings Including Gates				55°27′41″N 4°38′19″W	Category B	47250	Upload another image
19 Wellington Square Including Railings				55°27′39″N 4°38′12″W	Category B	47253	Upload Photo
20 Wellington Square				55°27′39″N 4°38′12″W	Category B	47254	Upload Photo
23 And 25 South Harbour Street				55°27′54″N 4°38′02″W	Category C(S)	47577	Upload Photo
Midton Road, Ayr Grammar Primary School Including Caretakers Cottage, Gatepiers, Gates, Railings And Boundary Wall				55°27′19″N 4°37′47″W	Category C(S)	49027	Upload Photo
35 Racecourse Road, Former Dovecot				55°27′11″N 4°38′12″W	Category B	21741	Upload Photo
3 Racecourse View, Inverdon House Including Boundary Wall				55°26′59″N 4°38′08″W	Category B	21755	Upload Photo
1 And 3 Sandgate				55°27′51″N 4°37′56″W	Category B	21769	Upload Photo
39 Sandgate, Queen's Court House				55°27′48″N 4°37′58″W	Category A	21777	Upload Photo
20 Sandgate And 1 Cathcart Street				55°27′50″N 4°37′59″W	Category B	21787	Upload Photo
34 And 34A Sandgate				55°27′48″N 4°38′01″W	Category B	21790	Upload Photo
18 Smith Street				55°27′32″N 4°37′37″W	Category B	21799	Upload Photo
1 Victoria Park, Carston House Including Ancillary Structure, Gatepiers And Boundary Wall				55°27′04″N 4°38′17″W	Category B	21810	Upload Photo
Wellington Square, Monument To Sir James Fergusson Of Kilkerran				55°27′41″N 4°38′07″W	Category B	21823	Upload Photo
2 Wheatfield Road, Sheninghurst Including Gatepiers, Gates, Railings And Boundary Wall				55°27′19″N 4°38′18″W	Category B	21826	Upload Photo
2 Castlehill Road, Market Inn Including Gate				55°27′26″N 4°37′29″W	Category C(S)	21827	Upload Photo
50 High Street				55°27′51″N 4°37′50″W	Category B	21620	Upload Photo
162-170 (Even Nos) High Street				55°27′43″N 4°37′45″W	Category C(S)	21635	Upload Photo
18 And 20 Hope Street				55°27′48″N 4°37′51″W	Category C(S)	21646	Upload Photo
23 John Street, St Margaret's Roman Catholic Church And Graveyard Including Boundary Wall				55°27′53″N 4°37′34″W	Category B	21647	Upload Photo
9 Kirk Port				55°27′47″N 4°37′46″W	Category C(S)	21650	Upload Photo
Main Street And North Harbour Street, Former Darlington Place Church Including Hall, Gatepiers, Gates, Railings And Boundary Wall				55°27′57″N 4°37′52″W	Category B	21658	Upload another image
30 Miller Road Including Gatepiers, Gates And Boundary Wall				55°27′30″N 4°37′56″W	Category B	21682	Upload Photo
27 And 29 Newmarket Street				55°27′47″N 4°37′53″W	Category C(S)	21707	Upload Photo
6 And 6A Cassilis Street Including Railings And Gate				55°27′45″N 4°38′16″W	Category B	21525	Upload Photo
6 Cathcart Street				55°27′50″N 4°38′01″W	Category C(S)	21529	Upload Photo
39 Charlotte Street, Almont Hotel, Including Boundary Wall And Postbox				55°27′45″N 4°38′23″W	Category C(S)	21544	Upload Photo
4 Abercromby Drive, Gearholm House Including Ancillary Structures And Boundary Wall				55°26′27″N 4°38′58″W	Category B	21559	Upload Photo
71-75 (Odd Nos) Dalblair Road				55°27′32″N 4°37′47″W	Category C(S)	21562	Upload Photo
Doonfoot Road, Former Seafield Lodge Including Gatepiers, Railings And Boundary Wall				55°26′52″N 4°38′25″W	Category C(S)	21566	Upload Photo
Dunure Road, Doonfoot Bridge Crossing River Doon				55°26′12″N 4°38′49″W	Category B	21569	Upload Photo
207 And 209 High Street				55°27′40″N 4°37′45″W	Category C(S)	21612	Upload Photo
Alloway, Burns Cottage Including Boundary Wall				55°25′58″N 4°38′00″W	Category A	21476	Upload another image See more images
Alloway, New Bridge Of Doon				55°25′37″N 4°38′17″W	Category B	21486	Upload Photo
Alloway Place, Dereel, Ayr Ex-Servicemen's Club Including Gatepier, Gates And Boundary Wall				55°27′36″N 4°38′05″W	Category B	21491	Upload Photo
1, (Clyde Cottage) And 1A Arran Terrace Including Boundary Wall, Gatepiers And Gates				55°27′54″N 4°38′19″W	Category C(S)	21492	Upload Photo
14 And 16 Bath Place Including Boundary Wall, Gatepiers, Gates And Railings				55°27′43″N 4°38′23″W	Category B	21504	Upload Photo
Doonfoot Road, Belleisle Estate, Belleisle House Hotel Including Mounting Block, Piers And Boundary Wall				55°26′22″N 4°38′22″W	Category B	21505	Upload Photo
1 And 2 Bruce Crescent Including Boundary Wall And Gatepiers				55°27′48″N 4°38′11″W	Category C(S)	21511	Upload Photo
5 Bruce Crescent Including Boundary Wall, Gatepiers And Postbox				55°27′47″N 4°38′13″W	Category C(S)	21514	Upload Photo
Brickrow Farm, Including Farmhouse And Ancillary Structure				55°29′00″N 4°33′24″W	Category C(S)	47007	Upload Photo
Doonholm Estate, Sundial				55°25′19″N 4°37′38″W	Category B	47008	Upload Photo
14 Barns Street And 30 Fullarton Street				55°27′39″N 4°38′00″W	Category B	47158	Upload Photo
66 Craigie Road, Western House				55°28′01″N 4°36′59″W	Category B	47172	Upload Photo
65-69 (Odd Nos) Dalblair Road				55°27′32″N 4°37′48″W	Category C(S)	47176	Upload Photo
124 And 126 High Street				55°27′46″N 4°37′47″W	Category C(S)	47201	Upload Photo
Main Street, Newton On Ayr Church (Church Of Scotland) Including Boundary Wall				55°28′02″N 4°37′44″W	Category C(S)	47209	Upload Photo
2, 4 New Road And 1 Weaver Street Including Boundary Wall				55°28′07″N 4°37′45″W	Category C(S)	47219	Upload Photo
Nile Court, Former Masonic Hall				55°27′45″N 4°37′45″W	Category B	47226	Upload Photo
Prestwick Road, St James' Parish Church, Church Hall And Manse (Church Of Scotland) Including Gatepiers, Gates, Lamp Standards, Railings And Boundary Wall				55°28′27″N 4°37′30″W	Category C(S)	47227	Upload Photo
88 Prestwick Road				55°28′40″N 4°37′17″W	Category C(S)	47228	Upload Photo
4 And 6 Queen's Terrace Including Railings				55°27′43″N 4°38′24″W	Category C(S)	47229	Upload Photo
23 Wellington Square				55°27′39″N 4°38′09″W	Category B	47257	Upload Photo
Auchencruive Estate, Dairy School				55°28′42″N 4°33′31″W	Category C(S)	49838	Upload Photo
7 Racecourse Road, Elmsley Including Gatepiers And Boundary Wall				55°27′27″N 4°38′07″W	Category C(S)	21731	Upload Photo
34 Racecourse Road And 1A And 1B Blackburn Road Including Gatepiers And Boundary Wall				55°27′12″N 4°38′17″W	Category B	21745	Upload Photo
50 Racecourse Road, Strathdoon House Including Gatepiers And Boundary Wall				55°27′03″N 4°38′21″W	Category B	21752	Upload Photo
7-11 (Odd Nos) Sandgate				55°27′50″N 4°37′56″W	Category B	21770	Upload Photo
13 Sandgate				55°27′50″N 4°37′57″W	Category C(S)	21771	Upload Photo
15 And 17 Sandgate				55°27′49″N 4°37′56″W	Category B	21772	Upload Photo
43 Sandgate				55°27′47″N 4°38′00″W	Category B	21779	Upload Photo
8 Sandgate				55°27′51″N 4°37′58″W	Category B	21783	Upload Photo
Wellington Square, Monument To James George Smith Neill, Cb				55°27′40″N 4°38′07″W	Category B	21821	Upload another image
Wellington Square, Monument To Archibald William, Earl Of Eglinton And Wintoun				55°27′40″N 4°38′14″W	Category B	21822	Upload another image
233 And 235 High Street				55°27′38″N 4°37′44″W	Category C(S)	21618	Upload Photo
84 And 86 High Street				55°27′49″N 4°37′48″W	Category C(S)	21622	Upload Photo
228 High Street				55°27′39″N 4°37′43″W	Category C(S)	21637	Upload Photo
230 High Street				55°27′39″N 4°37′43″W	Category B	21638	Upload another image
Holmston Road, Ayr Cemetery Entrance And Lodge (No 56 Holmston Road) Including Ancillary Structures, Gates, Gatepiers, Railings And Boundary Wall				55°27′23″N 4°37′02″W	Category C(S)	21644	Upload Photo
John Street, Wallacetown Parish Church (Church Of Scotland) Including Church Hall, Gatepiers, Gates, Railings And Boundary Wall				55°27′49″N 4°37′30″W	Category B	21648	Upload another image
Kirk Port, Auld Kirk Of Ayr Gateway				55°27′47″N 4°37′45″W	Category A	21654	Upload another image
Boat Vennal, Loudoun Hall				55°27′53″N 4°37′57″W	Category A	21656	Upload another image
Midton Road, Ayr St Columba's Church (Church Of Scotland) And Church Hall Including Boundary Wall				55°27′11″N 4°37′51″W	Category B	21662	Upload Photo
25 Midton Road, Dolphin House Including Ancillary Structure, Gatepiers And Boundary Wall				55°27′15″N 4°37′51″W	Category B	21663	Upload Photo
21 And 29 New Bridge Street And 1-9 (Odd Nos) High Street, Town Buildings				55°27′51″N 4°37′55″W	Category A	21692	Upload Photo
22 New Bridge Street				55°27′52″N 4°37′56″W	Category C(S)	21696	Upload Photo
1 And 3 New Road Including Railings And Boundary Wall				55°28′08″N 4°37′46″W	Category C(S)	21701	Upload Photo
3 Newmarket Street				55°27′48″N 4°37′51″W	Category C(S)	21703	Upload Photo
71 Newmarket Street				55°27′48″N 4°37′58″W	Category C(S)	21710	Upload Photo
5 Cassilis Street Including Boundary Wall				55°27′44″N 4°38′14″W	Category B	21526	Upload Photo
20 Cathcart Street, Cathcart House Including Boundary Wall And Railings				55°27′50″N 4°38′04″W	Category B	21533	Upload Photo
5 Charlotte Street				55°27′45″N 4°38′09″W	Category C(S)	21537	Upload Photo
2 Craigie Avenue Including Gatepiers, Gate, Railings And Boundary Wall				55°27′47″N 4°37′22″W	Category B	21555	Upload Photo
1 Craigweil Road, Wellington School (Carleton Turrets, Senior Department) Including Gatepiers, Gates, Railings And Boundary Wall				55°27′16″N 4°38′28″W	Category C(S)	21557	Upload Photo
18 And 20 Doonfoot Road, Nightingale House Including Gatepiers And Boundary Wall				55°26′48″N 4°38′26″W	Category C(S)	21567	Upload Photo
2 Doonholm Road Including Gatepiers, Gates And Boundary Wall				55°25′56″N 4°38′03″W	Category B	21570	Upload Photo
47 And 49 Fort Street				55°27′44″N 4°38′07″W	Category B	21578	Upload Photo
2 Fort Street, Old Custom House Including Boundary Wall				55°27′53″N 4°38′00″W	Category B	21579	Upload Photo
25 And 27 Fullarton Street Including Boundary Wall				55°27′41″N 4°37′58″W	Category C(S)	21585	Upload Photo
53 And 53A High Street				55°27′49″N 4°37′50″W	Category B	21599	Upload Photo
61 And 63 High Street				55°27′49″N 4°37′50″W	Category B	21601	Upload Photo
75 High Street And 2 Newmarket Street				55°27′48″N 4°37′50″W	Category B	21603	Upload Photo
101 And 103 High Street				55°27′46″N 4°37′50″W	Category C(S)	21609	Upload Photo
Alloway, Alloway Parish Church (Church Of Scotland) Including Graveyard, Gatepiers, Gates, Railings And Boundary Wall				55°25′39″N 4°38′12″W	Category B	21472	Upload Photo
Burns Statue Square, South African War Memorial				55°27′29″N 4°37′40″W	Category B	21516	Upload Photo
St Quivox, St Evox Including Boundary Wall				55°29′00″N 4°34′24″W	Category C(S)	4872	Upload Photo
55-63 (Odd Nos) Dalblair Road				55°27′32″N 4°37′49″W	Category C(S)	47175	Upload Photo
73 Monument Road, The Neuk Including Gatepiers And Boundary Wall				55°26′35″N 4°37′44″W	Category C(S)	47217	Upload Photo
56 And 58 Sandgate				55°27′47″N 4°38′03″W	Category C(S)	47236	Upload Photo
24-30 (Even Nos) Smith Street				55°27′31″N 4°37′38″W	Category C(S)	47237	Upload Photo
2 And 4 Springvale Road Including Gatepiers, Gate And Boundary Wall				55°27′13″N 4°37′54″W	Category C(S)	47241	Upload Photo
9 Wellington Square Including Railings				55°27′42″N 4°38′11″W	Category B	47246	Upload Photo

== Key ==
The scheme for classifying buildings in Scotland is:

- Category A: "buildings of national or international importance, either architectural or historic; or fine, little-altered examples of some particular period, style or building type."
- Category B: "buildings of regional or more than local importance; or major examples of some particular period, style or building type, which may have been altered."
- Category C: "buildings of local importance; lesser examples of any period, style, or building type, as originally constructed or moderately altered; and simple traditional buildings which group well with other listed buildings."

In March 2016 there were 47,288 listed buildings in Scotland. Of these, 8% were Category A, and 50% were Category B, with the remaining 42% being Category C.
