= Cyperus subcastaneus =

Scientific classification
- Kingdom: Plantae
- Clade: Tracheophytes
- Clade: Angiosperms
- Clade: Monocots
- Clade: Commelinids
- Order: Poales
- Family: Cyperaceae
- Genus: Cyperus
- Species: C. subcastaneus

Binomial name
- Cyperus subcastaneus D.A.Simpson

Species of plant native to Brazil

Cyperus subcastaneus is a species of sedge that occurs in Brazil, where it is found from Bahia to Minas Gerais.

The species was first formally described by the botanist David Alan Simpson in 1987.

== See also ==
- List of Cyperus species
