= Cyperus mudugensis =

Scientific classification
- Kingdom: Plantae
- Clade: Tracheophytes
- Clade: Angiosperms
- Clade: Monocots
- Clade: Commelinids
- Order: Poales
- Family: Cyperaceae
- Genus: Cyperus
- Species: C. mudugensis

Binomial name
- Cyperus mudugensis D.A.Simpson, 1994

Species of sedge

Cyperus mudugensis is a species of sedge that is native to central and eastern parts of Somalia.

== See also ==
- List of Cyperus species
