= Belmont Academy =

Coordinates: 55°26′46″N 4°37′02″W

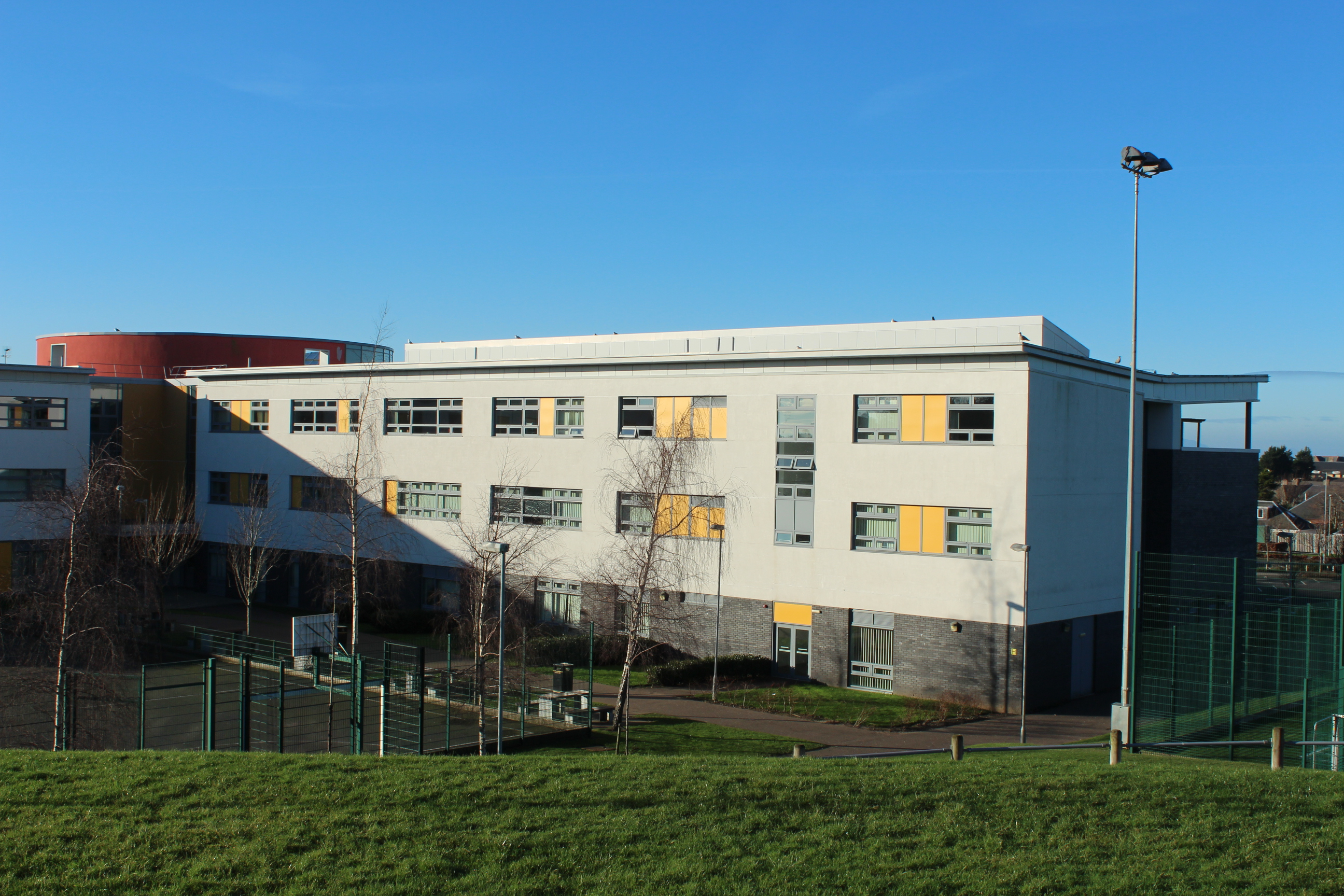
- School badge Belmont Academy building, January 2017

Location
- 8 Nursery Rd; Ayr, South Ayrshire, KA7 3SN; Scotland

Information
- Type: 11–18 non-denominational secondary school
- Motto: Bear Witness
- Established: 1960
- Local authority: South Ayrshire Council
- Head Teacher: Kevin Boyd
- Gender: Boys and girls
- Age: 11 to 18
- Enrolment: 1,225 (2023–2024)
- Houses: Arran, Bute, Cumbrae, Kintyre, Lomond
- Colour
- School years: S1-S6
- Website: Belmont Academy

Belmont Academy (Scottish Gaelic: Àrd-sgoil Bhelmont) is an 11–18 non-denominational secondary school located in the Belmont area of Ayr, in South Ayrshire, Scotland. The school is operated by South Ayrshire Council, with Kevin Boyd serving as the Head Teacher of Belmont Academy since 2022. Belmont Academy is the largest secondary school in South Ayrshire based on pupil intake, with a total of 1,225 pupils enrolled at the school in 2023–2024.

The original Belmont High School opened in 1960, and by 2008, the school transferred from the 48-year-old campus into a new building, which was opened to pupils in August 2008.

== History ==
Belmont High School became Belmont Academy in 1969, it was established in 1960 in order to provide secondary education as a result of the increase in the school leaving age in Scotland. When the school leaving age rose to 15, Ayr Academy no longer had the capacity for all the secondary school children in Ayr and so Belmont was built. Originally, Belmont High School had four houses which were named after islands in the Firth of Clyde, the geographical area of Scotland in which South Ayrshire is located. The houses of Belmont Academy were Arran, Bute, Craig, and Cumbrae House. As a result of increasing school rolls, Kintyre was added to make five houses, then Bute house was dropped as a consequence of the school roll declining. However, it was reinstated together with the addition of Lomond House as the school roll began to grow significantly again.

The original Belmont High School building built in 1960 was originally split into three separate buildings, known as A, B and C blocks respectively, with C block being the largest of the three which contained the main office of the school. In mid-2006, Mainholm Academy was closed for repairs and all of the school's pupils were decanted into neighbouring schools – namely the Belmont, Ayr and Kyle Academies. Subsequently, on 24 November 2006 it was revealed by South Ayrshire Council that Mainholm would be closed permanently and the transfer of pupils to new schools became permanent.

Belmont Academy, along with Prestwick Academy, has had a new campus built to replace their aged original buildings. South Ayrshire Council made use of the controversial public-private partnership (PPP) plan to finance the project. Construction work was contracted to the British-based company Carillion. Work was originally due to start in the summer of 2006 but was delayed until 2007. Construction of the new campus commenced on 10 January 2007 and the new building was opened to pupils in August 2008. The former playing fields beside the school were entirely fenced off during this process. Although work started later than intended the school was completed by the original date in 2008 and opened to pupils on 24 August 2008. The gradual dismantling and demolition of the original buildings began shortly after the new facilities opened, during which time the old campus was completely sealed off from the new. The demolition and clearing was finished by February 2009.

== Attainment and achievement ==
In May 2020, Belmont Academy was ranked fifth amongst secondary schools in South Ayrshire based on the number of pupils attaining higher (SCQF Level 6) qualifications. 35% of pupils attending the school achieved five or more higher qualifications, placing the school 145 out of the 344 secondary schools in Scotland. The schools 2020 performance figures were a decrease from 2017 when 46% of pupils achieved at least three or more higher qualifications.

By 2022, the school ranked 7th amongst all secondary schools in Ayrshire and 93rd amongst all secondary schools in Scotland for both five or more passes at National 5 and Higher.

== Houses ==
The school has five houses into which the pupils of the school are assigned.

Named after islands in the Firth of Clyde, the original four house were:

- Arran
- Craig
- Cumbrae
- Bute

The current five houses of Belmont Academy are:

- – Cumbrae
- – Bute
- – Lomond
- – Kintyre
- – Arran

== Associated primary schools ==
The current primary schools linking with Belmont are:

- Alloway Primary School
- Braehead Primary School
- Doonfoot Primary School
- Holmston Primary School
- Kincaidston Primary School
- Tarbolton Primary School

== Notable former pupils ==
Notable former pupils include:

- Mike Scott from The Waterboys
- Arnie Burgoyne from Echo and the Bunnymen
- Noam Dar, professional wrestler
- Stuart Murdoch, lead singer of Belle and Sebastian
- David Simpson, cricketer
- Jock Zonfrillo, television presenter and chef
- Ewan McVicar, DJ
