= County Buildings, Ayr =

County building in Ayr, Scotland

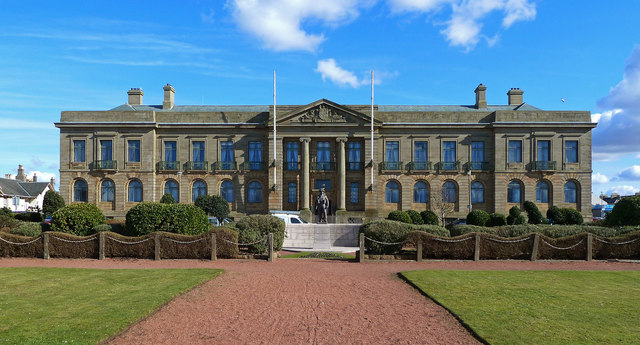
- The main office building (at the western end of the complex)

- Shown in South Ayrshire
- 55.4613°N 4.6386°W
- Location: Wellington Square, Ayr, Scotland

History
- Built: 1818

Site notes
- Architect(s): Robert Wallace and Alexander Mair
- Architectural style: Neoclassical style

Listed Building – Category A
- Official name: Ayr Sheriff Court and Justice of the Peace Court, including boundary wall and gatepiers, 14 Wellington Square, Ayr
- Designated: 5 February 1971
- Reference no.: LB21820

Listed Building – Category B
- Official name: Wellington Square, County Buildings including gates
- Designated: 5 February 1971
- Reference no.: LB47250

County Buildings is a municipal complex in Wellington Square, Ayr, Scotland which serves as the headquarters and main meeting place of South Ayrshire Council. The original structure, the former sheriff court at the eastern end of the complex, is Category A listed building, while the main office building at the western end of the complex, is a Category B listed building.

== History ==
=== Early history ===
The earliest part of the complex is the sheriff court: it was designed by Robert Wallace in the neoclassical style, built in ashlar stone at a cost of £30,000 and was completed in 1818. The design involved a symmetrical main frontage with eleven bays facing onto Wellington Square with the end bays slightly projected forward; the central section of three bays featured a tetrastyle portico with Ionic order columns supporting an entablature and a pediment. The building was fenestrated with round headed windows on the ground floor and sash windows on the first floor. At roof level, there was a cornice, a balustrade and a large central dome. Internally, the principal rooms were the two courtrooms. There was originally a prison at the rear of the building.

The building continued to be used as a facility for dispensing justice but, following the implementation of the Local Government (Scotland) Act 1889, which established county councils in every county, one of the courtrooms was allocated for use as the meeting place of Ayrshire County Council.

=== Extension ===
In the early 1930s, county leaders decided to demolish the old prison and to extend the building to the west to provide bespoke offices for the county council. The foundation stone for the extension, which was much larger than the original building, was laid by the Duke of York, who was accompanied by the Duchess of York, on 10 July 1931. It was designed by Alexander Mair in the neoclassical style and was completed in 1935. The design involved a symmetrical main frontage with seventeen bays facing towards the sea with the end three bays on either side slightly projected forward as pavilions; the central section of three bays featured a tetrastyle portico with piers and Ionic order columns supporting an entablature and a pediment with a coat of arms in the tympanum. It was fenestrated with sash windows on both floors and most of the first floor windows were enhanced with balconies. Internally, the principal rooms were the council chamber and the committee rooms, which were named after the five burghs of the county, on the first floor.

A memorial designed by Pilkington Jackson, commemorating the lives of soldiers of the Royal Scots Fusiliers who had died in the Second World War, was unveiled in the garden of the County Buildings in 1960.

=== Governance use ===
Following the abolition of Ayrshire County Council, the complex became a sub-regional office of Strathclyde Regional Council in 1975, and then, after the introduction of unitary authorities, it became the headquarters of South Ayrshire Council in 1996.

== Composition ==
=== Ground floor ===
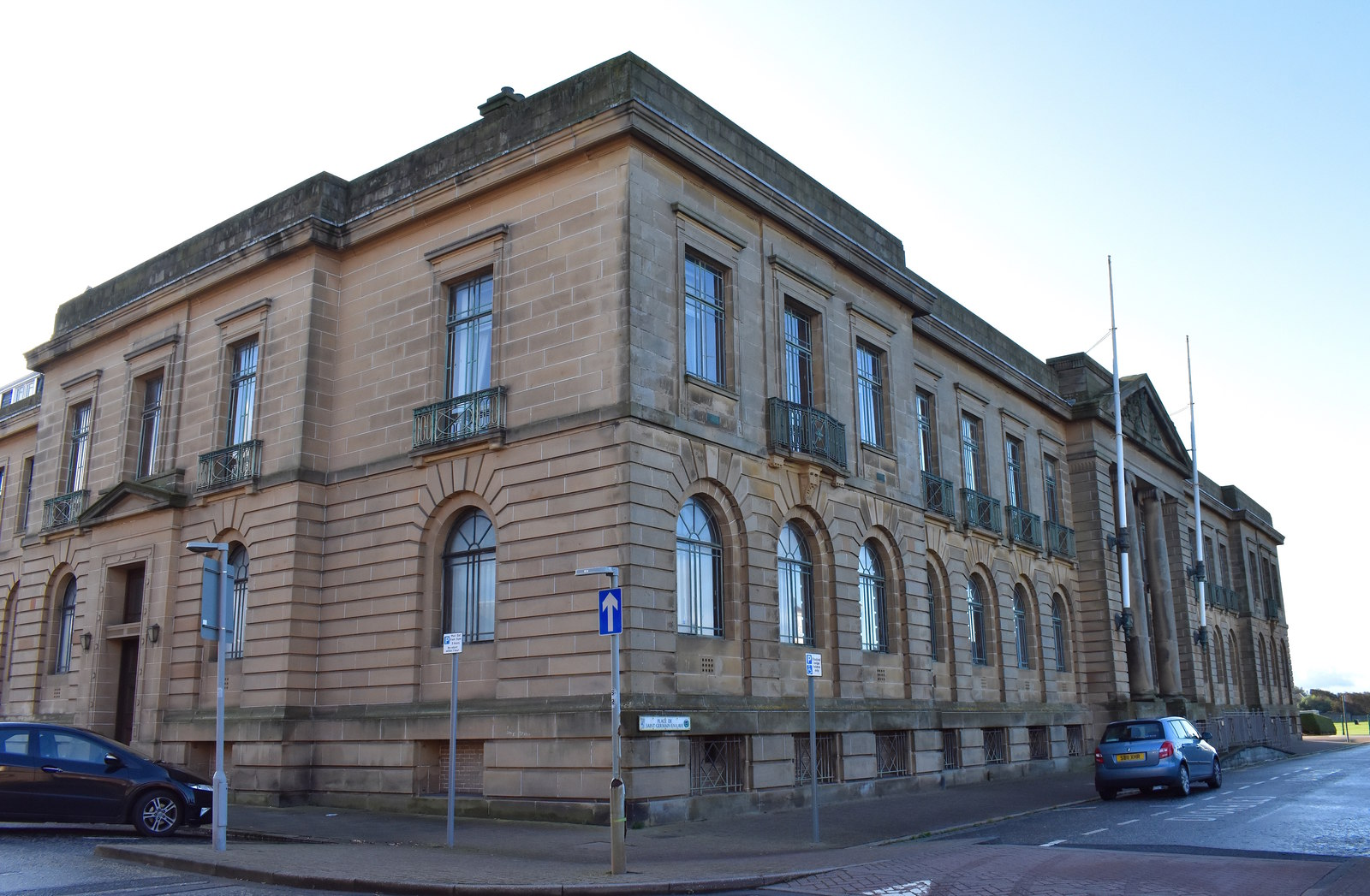
Front and side facade of County Buildings

The ground floor of County Buildings features the main entrance hall consisting of two semi-circular staircases which lead to the debating chamber of South Ayrshire Council as well as leading to a number of committee rooms. The staircases feature a number of large windows which are of leaded stained glass. The Coat of Arms of the former Ayr County Council feature on the largest stained glass window whilst the remaining four windows feature the crests of the sixteen separate Burghs of Ayrshire. Portraits of George Boyle, 4th Earl of Glasgow and C.G. Shaw line the north staircase and the south features portraits of Sir James Fergusson, 6th Baronet and Hugh Montgomerie, 12th Earl of Eglinton.

=== First floor ===
The fumed oak finished council chamber, committee rooms and members corridor are housed on the first floor of the building. The debating chamber of the council features sliding partition doors which were designed to permit the committee rooms on either side of the debating chamber to be opened up for increased space during the hosting of council functions. The county hall room features the Coat of Arms of the Ayr county alongside the Coat of Arms of South Ayrshire Council. The first floor also features the dining room and servery.

Portraits of Lieutenant Colonel W.K. Hamilton-Campbell of Netherplace, John Claude Hamilton, Colonel Wallace of Busbie and Sir James Shaw, 1st Baronet are amongst some of the portraits displayed on the first floor of the building. A considerable amount of furnisher contained within County Buildings has been in use continuously since the building first opened. Since the creation of South Ayrshire Council in 1996 and the role the building has as the councils headquarters, portraits of all provosts of South Ayrshire Council are displayed on the first floor.

== Flag flying days ==
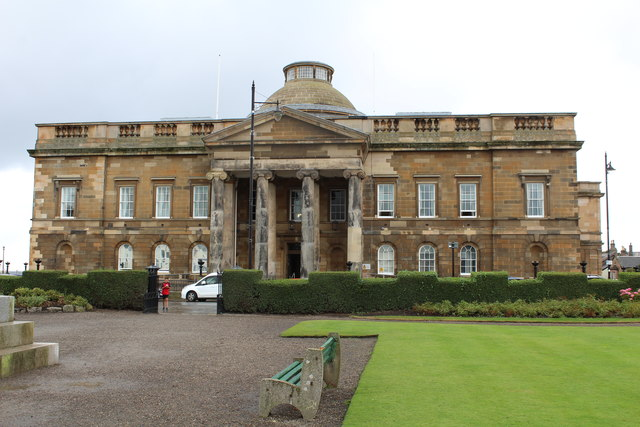
The sheriff court in Wellington Square (at the eastern end of the complex)

Like over governmental buildings, County Buildings as the headquarters of South Ayrshire Council has specific flag flying days. The flag flying days for County Buildings are:

- The birthday of Robert Burns - 25 January annually
- Commonwealth Day - second Monday in March annually
- Anniversary of the Declaration of Arbroath - 3 April annually
- The birthday of the reigning monarch
- Europe Day, when the European Flag must be flown - 9 May annually
- Anniversary of the reigning monarchs Coronation Day
- The birthday of King of Scots Robert the Bruce – 11 July annually
- Remembrance Sunday - 2nd Sunday in November annually
- St Andrew's Day (Flag of Scotland to be flown and given priority) - 30 November annually
- When meetings are held of South Ayrshire Council at County Buildings - once in every 12 weeks.

== Art collection ==
Works of art in the county buildings include a portrait by Daniel Macnee of Colonel John Hamilton of the 3rd Dragoon Guards, a portrait by John Graham-Gilbert of Archibald Montgomerie, 13th Earl of Eglinton and a portrait by George Reid of Lieutenant Colonel Lieutenant Colonel William Kentigern Hamilton-Campbell.

== See also ==
- List of listed buildings in Ayr, South Ayrshire
- List of Category A listed buildings in South Ayrshire
