= South Ayrshire =

Council area of Scotland

South Ayrshire: Siorrachd Àir a Deas (Scottish Gaelic); Sooth Ayrshire (Scots)
- Council area
- Coat of arms
- Motto: Ne'er Forget the People
- South Ayrshire shown within Scotland
- Coordinates: 55°17′N 4°42′W
- Sovereign state: United Kingdom
- Country: Scotland
- Lieutenancy area: Ayrshire and Arran
- District: 1975
- Unitary authority: 1 April 1996
- Administrative HQ: County Buildings, Ayr

Government
  - Type: Council
  - Body: South Ayrshire Council
  - Control: No overall control
  - Provost: Iain Campbell
  - Council leader: Brian Connolly
  - MPs: 2 MPs: Elaine Stewart (L); Alan Gemmell (L)
  - MSPs: 2 MSPs: Siobhian Brown (SNP); Katie Hagmann (SNP)

Area
  - Total: 472 sq mi (1,222 km^{2})
  - Rank: 15th

Population (2024)
  - Total: 112,260
  - Rank: 20th
  - Density: 240/sq mi (92/km^{2})
- Time zone: UTC+0 (GMT)
  - Summer (DST): UTC+1 (BST)
- ISO 3166 code: GB-SAY
- GSS code: S12000028
- Website: south-ayrshire.gov.uk

South Ayrshire (Scots: Sooth Ayrshire; Scottish Gaelic: Siorrachd Àir a Deas, pronounced [ˈʃirˠəxk aːɾʲ ə ˈtʲes̪]) is one of thirty-two council areas of Scotland, covering the southern part of Ayrshire. It borders onto Dumfries and Galloway, East Ayrshire and North Ayrshire. South Ayrshire had an estimated population in 2021 of 112,450, making it the 19th–largest subdivision in Scotland by population. With an area of 472 sq mi, South Ayrshire ranks as the 15th largest subdivision in Scotland.

South Ayrshire's administrative centre is located in its largest town, Ayr. The headquarters for its associated political body, South Ayrshire Council, is housed at the town's County Buildings, located in Wellington Square. Ayr is the former county town of the historic Ayrshire county, with the political activity of the Ayrshire County Council being based at County Buildings. From 1975 to 1996 under the name Kyle and Carrick (Scottish Gaelic: A' Chùil agus a' Charraig) it was one of nineteen local government districts in the Strathclyde region.

== History ==
=== Creation ===
South Ayrshire within Strathclyde

The district was created in 1975 under the Local Government (Scotland) Act 1973, which established a two-tier structure of local government across Scotland comprising upper-tier regions and lower-tier districts. Kyle and Carrick was one of nineteen districts created within the region of Strathclyde. The district covered the whole area of seven former districts and parts of another two from the historic county of Ayrshire, which were all abolished at the same time:

- Ayr Burgh
- Ayr District (except the part within the designated area of Irvine New Town)
- Dalmellington District (part, being Coylton and that part of the parish of Ayr within that district - rest of district to Cumnock and Doon Valley)
- Girvan Burgh
- Girvan District
- Maybole Burgh
- Maybole District
- Prestwick Burgh
- Troon Burgh

The district bordered districts of Cunninghame, Kilmarnock & Loudoun and Cumnock and Doon Valley Districts of Strathclyde to its north and east as well as Stewartry and Wigtown Districts in Dumfries & Galloway.

In 1974 Alistair Irving Haughan was appointed Chief Architect of Kyle & Carrick District Council, holding the post until he retired in December 1990. While Haughan was in post the work the Council undertook on the restoration of Tam o' Shanter's bridge, the Brig O' Doon in Alloway won a Stone Federation Award.

The district was abolished in 1996 by the Local Government etc. (Scotland) Act 1994 which replaced regions and districts with unitary council areas. South Ayrshire council area was formed with identical boundaries to Kyle and Carrick District.

==== Political control ====
The first election to the district council was held in 1974, initially operating as a shadow authority alongside the outgoing authorities until it came into its powers on 16 May 1975. Political control of the council from 1975 was as follows:

Party in control	Years
Conservative	1975–1980
Labour	1980–1984
Conservative	1984–1988
Labour	1988–1992
Conservative	1992–1996

==== Premises ====
The district council's headquarters were in Ayr, where they established offices in Burns House in Burns Statue Square with a satellite office in a two-storey, 19th century villa at 30 Miller Road.

South Ayrshire was created in 1996 under the Local Government etc. (Scotland) Act 1994, which replaced Scotland's previous local government structure of upper-tier regions and lower-tier districts with unitary council areas providing all local government services. South Ayrshire covered the same area as the abolished Kyle and Carrick district, and also took over the functions of the abolished Strathclyde Regional Council within the area. The area's name references its location within the historic county of Ayrshire, which had been abolished for local government purposes in 1975 when Kyle and Carrick district and Strathclyde region had been created.

=== City status bid ===
In 2021, South Ayrshire submitted a bid for city status as part of the 2022 Platinum Jubilee Celebrations. The bid was based on the area's rich history and links to royalty, and received backing from organisations and businesses including Ayrshire College and Scottish Enterprise. The bid was ultimately unsuccessful, with eight other settlements across the UK, overseas territories and crown dependencies being awarded city status, including Scottish town Dunfermline.

=== 2025 executive crisis ===
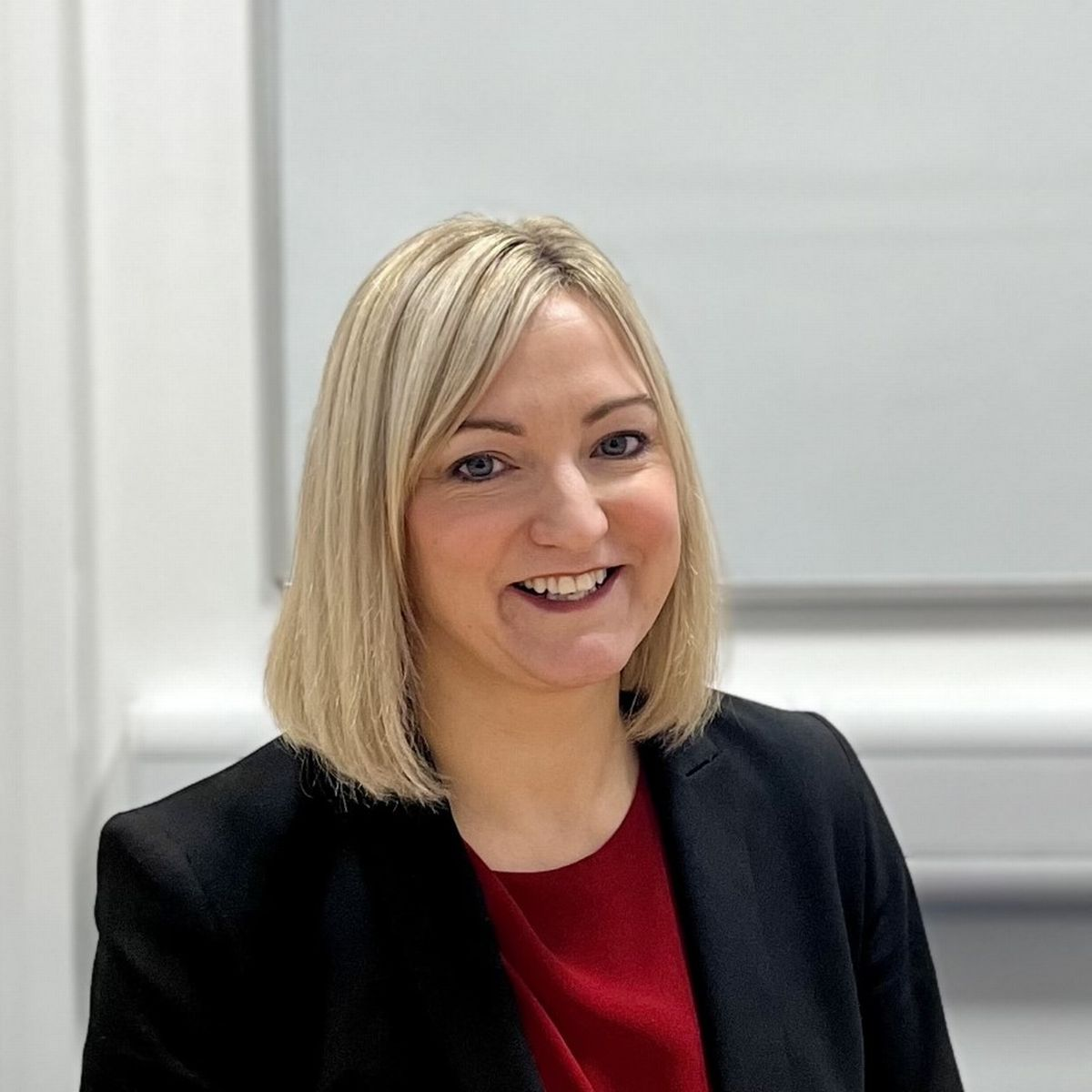
Lyndsay McRoberts became Acting Chief Executive following the resignation of Mike Newall in June 2025

In late April 2025, the Scottish Conservatives leader of the council, Martin Dowey, faced pressure to resign in the aftermath of leaked audio from a meeting that took place in his office at County Buildings in 2023. The audio from the meeting showed that Dowey appeared to have put measures in place to ensure contractors personally associated with him were in a stronger position to win forthcoming contacts for demolition works, including the Station hotel which had recently went on fire. There were calls for him to resign with immediate effect, something he initially refused to do, instead, deciding to "temporarily step aside" in order to not become a distraction for both the council and the work of the council.

At a council meeting on 1 May 2025, the Deputy Leader of South Ayrshire Council, Bob Pollock, faced a vote of no confidence which he subsequently lost by 14 votes in favour to 13 against in regards to removing him as the Deputy Leader. Subsequently, the Provost of South Ayrshire Council, Iain Campbell, submitted his resignation with immediate effect, stating he was "totally disgusted" by the behaviour displayed in the council chamber during the meeting. A further motion of no confidence in leader Martin Dowey was lodged by Scottish Labour Party councillors, however, the meeting of the council was eventually formally suspended as a result of the intensity of the debate. Shortly afterwards, the leader of the council, Martin Dowey, formally submitted his resignation with immediate effect. The Deputy Chief Executive and Director of Education for South Ayrshire Council, Lyndsay McRoberts, announced she would be leaving her post within the council to take up the position of Director of Educational Resources at South Lanarkshire Council.

In May 2025, Councillors Iain Campbell and Brian Connolly were appointed to the positions of provost and leader of the council respectively. In June 2025, the chief executive of South Ayrshire Council, Mike Newall, resigned in a similar scandal relating to surfaced recordings between him and a contractor bidding for demolition work in which Newall appears to help the contractor win the contract. In the recording, Newall also speaks unprofessionally of others within the council, particularly the planning department and the councils head of legal services. Following his resignation, Depute Chief Executive and Director of Education, Lyndsay McRoberts, assumed the role of acting chief executive, however, as she was to leave the council in August to take up the Director of Education post in South Lanarkshire, she was succeeded by Cleland Sneddon as interim chief executive. She continued to serve as Acting Chief Executive until she left the authority in August.

== Geography ==
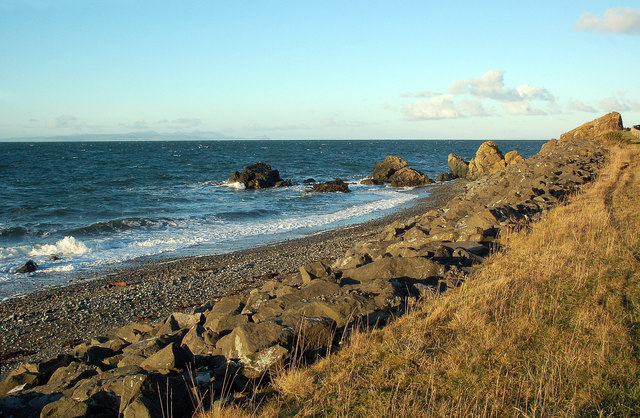
South Ayrshire coastline on the Firth of Clyde.

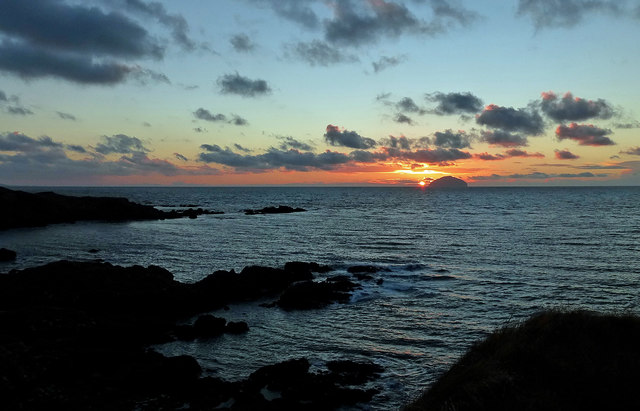
South Ayrshire coastline showing Ailsa Craig in the background.

Geographically, South Ayrshire is located on the western coast of Scotland, sharing borders with neighbouring local authorities East Ayrshire, Dumfries and Galloway and North Ayrshire. The climate in South Ayrshire, typical of that in western Scotland, is milder than that of eastern Scotland due to the stronger maritime influence, as the prevailing winds blow from the sea into South Ayrshire, which is located primarily on the western coast of Scotland. The warm Gulf Stream also has a strong influence on western Scotland. With winds mainly blowing from the sea the annual mean temperatures are in the range 9.5 to 9.9 °C (49.1 to 49.8 °F) in coastal areas of South Ayrshire such as Ayr and Troon.

The sea reaches its lowest temperature in February or early March so that on average February is the coldest month in some coastal parts of South Ayrshire along with the Rhins of Galloway, Kintyre and the Hebrides. In February the mean daily minimum temperature varies from about 2 °C in most of the islands, 1 to 2 °C along most of the Solway Firth and lowland inland areas, but less than −1 °C in parts of the Southern Uplands and central Highlands. Inland, where the influence of the sea is less, January is the coldest month with mean daily minimum temperatures generally between −3 and 0 °C.

The number of hours of natural sunshine in South Ayrshire is controlled by the length of day and by cloudiness. In general, December is the dullest month and May or June the sunniest. Sunshine duration decreases with increasing altitude, increasing latitude and distance from the coast. Local topography also exerts a strong influence and in the winter deep glens and north-facing slopes can be in shade for long periods. Industrial pollution and smoke haze can also reduce sunshine amounts, but the decline in heavy industry in the Ayrshire area, primarily in Ayr in South Ayrshire along with Kilmarnock in East Ayrshire, has resulted in an increase in sunshine duration particularly in the winter months.

Average annual rainfall totals range from less than 1,000 mm (39 in) in the upper Clyde valley and along the coasts of Ayrshire and Dumfries and Galloway to on average over 3,500 mm (140 in) over the higher parts of the west Highlands, approaching the maximum values found in the UK (over 4,000 millimetres or 160 inches further north).

== Demography ==
=== Population ===
In 2022, the population of South Ayrshire stood at 112,450, with 47.8% male and 52.2% female. The population of South Ayrshire is projected to decrease by 6.5% to 105,191, whilst the population of Scotland nationally is projected to increase 2.5%. The number of children in South Ayrshire is expected to decrease by 17%, with the working age population of the area set to fall by 14% by 2043. The population aged over 75 years is expected to increase by 65% in South Ayrshire by 2043.

South Ayrshire accounted for 2% of the overall Scottish population in 2022, with 20 of the most deprived data zones in Scotland being in South Ayrshire, making the area the 12th highest across Scotland.

=== Languages ===
The 2022 Scottish Census reported that out of 109,035 residents aged three and over, 39,739 (36.4%) considered themselves able to speak or read the Scots language.

The 2022 Scottish Census reported that out of 109,035 residents aged three and over, 907 (0.8%) considered themselves able to speak or read Gaelic.

=== Settlements ===
The largest settlements in South Ayrshire.

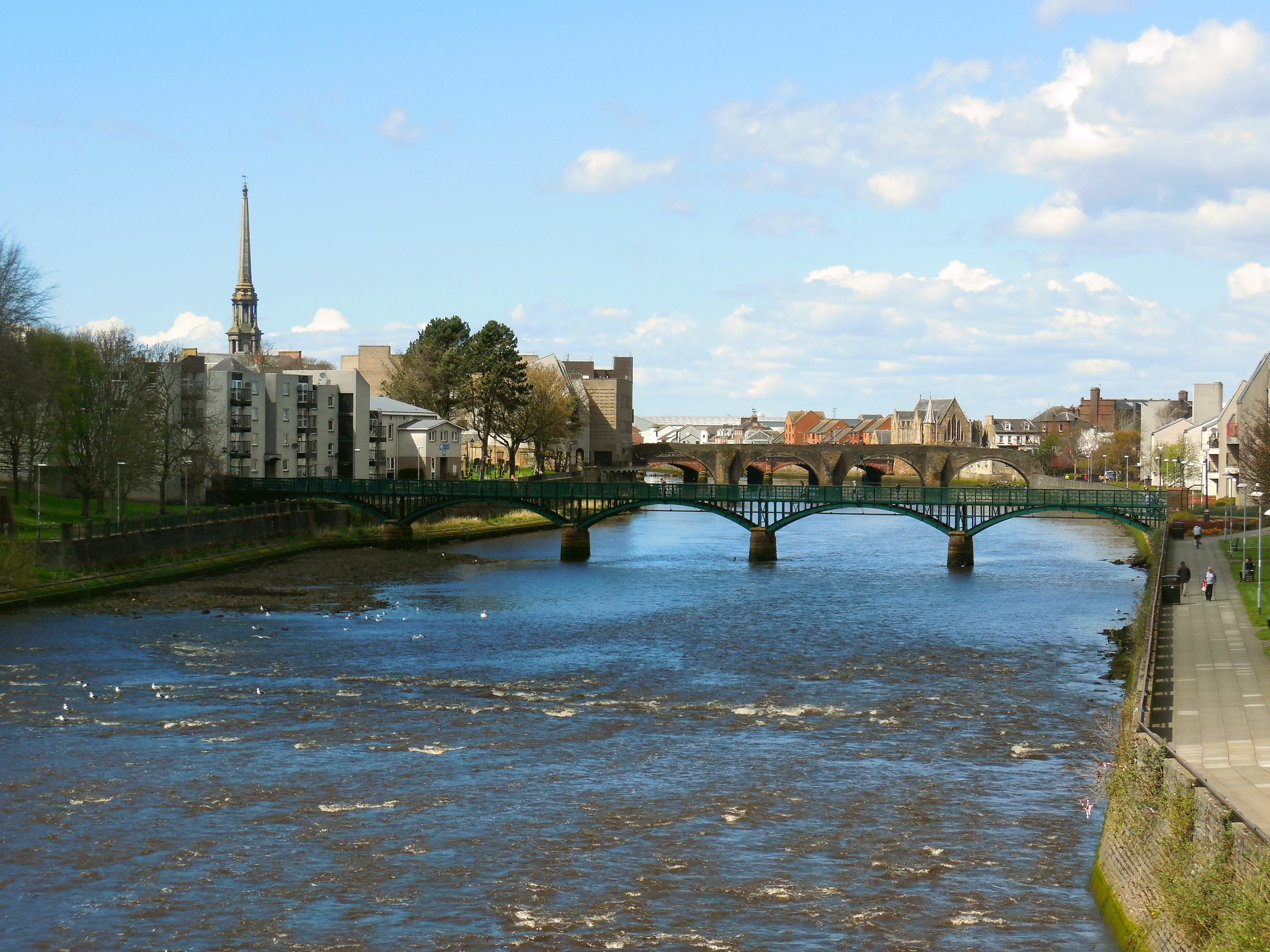
Ayr is the largest settlement within South Ayrshire in terms of both area and population.

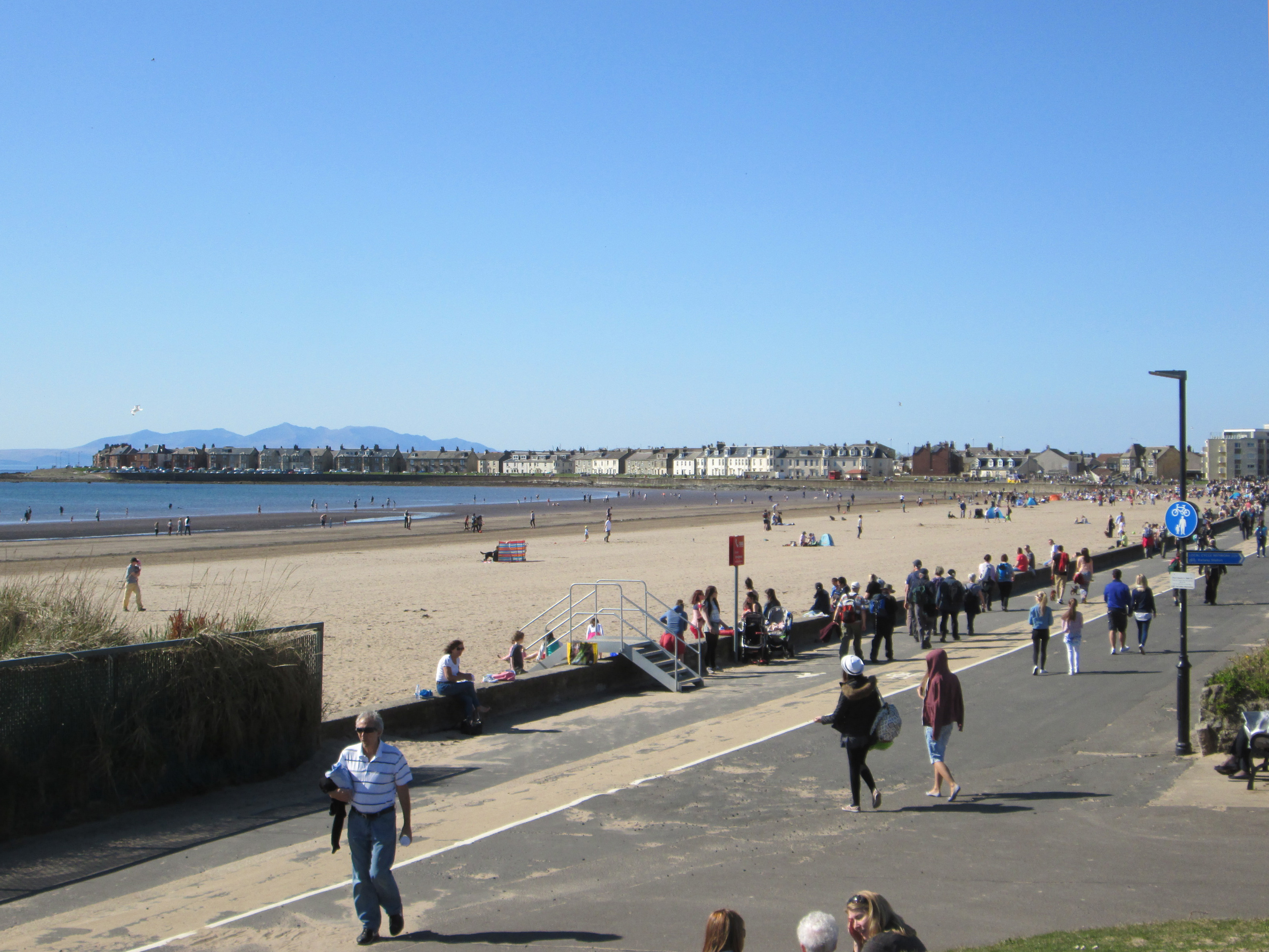
Troon, after Ayr, is one of South Ayrshire's largest settlements in terms of population and a major tourist attraction, attracting visitors to its beaches and golf courses.

South Ayrshire's population is mostly concentrated around the adjoining coastal towns of Ayr, Prestwick and Troon located to the north-west of the council, which represents 68% of the council's total population according to data derived from the 2011 census, with a combined population of 76,846. Other areas of significance include the towns of Maybole and Girvan which are located to the south of the council area in the district of Carrick.

Largest settlements by population:

Settlement	Population (2020)
Ayr	46,260
Troon	14,950
Prestwick	14,880
Girvan	6,330
Maybole	4,580
Dundonald	2,570
Coylton	2,160
Mossblown	2,100
Tarbolton	1,860
Symington	1,510

A list of settlements in South Ayrshire may be found below:

=== Towns ===
Ayr is the administrative centre of the South Ayrshire Council, and the historic county town of Ayrshire. With a population of 47,982, Ayr is the 14th largest settlement in Scotland and largest town in Ayrshire by population. The town is contiguous with the smaller town of Prestwick to the north. Ayr submitted unsuccessful bids for city status in 2000 and 2002, and as part of the wider South Ayrshire area in 2022. Ayr was established as a Royal Burgh in 1205 and is the county town of Ayrshire. It served as Ayrshire's central marketplace and harbour throughout the medieval period and was a port during the early modern period.

Troon is the second largest town in South Ayrshire and is about eight miles (thirteen kilometres) north of Ayr and three miles (five kilometres) northwest of Glasgow Prestwick Airport. Troon has a port with ferry and freight services, and a yacht marina and since March 2024, Caledonian MacBrayne have operated a ferry service to Brodick on the Isle of Arran. In the 2001 census the population of Troon, not including the nearby village of Loans but including the Barassie area, was estimated at 14,766, a 4.77% increase on the 1991 estimate of 14,094. The population in 2024 is just over 15,000

South Ayrshire's five towns are as follows:

- Ayr
- Girvan
- Prestwick
- Troon
- Maybole

=== Villages and hamlets ===
- Alloway (Suburb of Ayr)
- Annbank
- Ballantrae
- Barassie (Suburb of Troon)
- Barr
- Barrhill
- Colmonell
- Coodham
- Coylton
- Craigie
- Crosshill
- Dailly
- Dundonald
- Dunure
- Failford
- Joppa (Suburb of Coylton)
- Kirkmichael
- Kirkoswald
- Lendalfoot
- Loans
- Maidens
- Monkton
- Mossblown
- Minishant
- Old Dailly
- Pinmore
- Pinwherry
- Straiton
- Symington
- Tarbolton
- Turnberry

== Economy ==
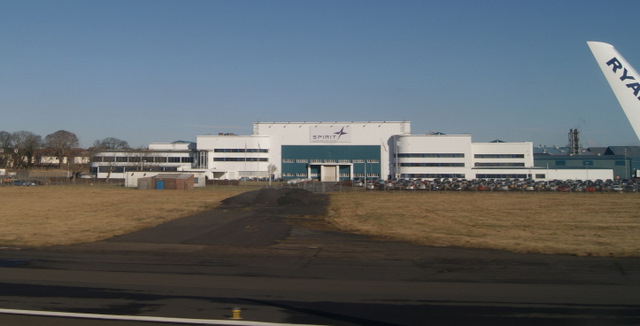
Spirit AeroSystems at Prestwick Airport

The economy of South Ayrshire, like many other areas, was badly affected during the worldwide financial crisis from 2009 to 2012. Despite this, total Gross Value Added for South Ayrshire has seen a steady increase over the last 20 years, reaching a peak in 2015 of £2.4 billion. South Ayrshire's GVA represents 1.9% of the total Scottish Gross Value Added income which is consistent with the previous 20 years. By 2022, South Ayrshire Gross Domestic Product (GDP) estimates stood at £2.710 billion.

The largest employment industry in South Ayrshire and Scotland is the public administration, education and health sector. Compared with Scotland, proportionally there are more South Ayrshire residents employed in this sector than Scotland, while there are proportionally fewer employed in banking, finance and insurance sector than Scotland. Despite being a coastal area, the smallest employment in South Ayrshire is in the agriculture and fishing sector.

=== Regional Economic Partnership ===
The council and its neighbours of East Ayrshire and North Ayrshire work together on economic growth as the Ayrshire Regional Economic Partnership, with support from the Scottish and UK governments and other private and public sector organisations.

=== Employment trends ===
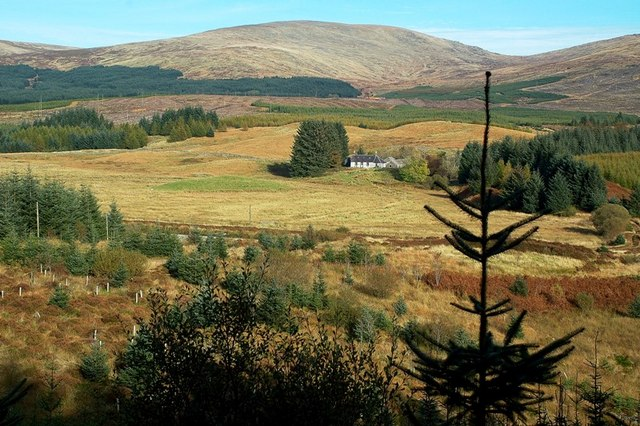
Rural landscape in South Ayrshire

Across South Ayrshire in 2023, 47,500 people were classed as being economically active, with 44,700 people categorised as being in employment (36,800 employed by a business or organisation and an additional 7,500 people classed as self employed). In the same period, a total of 1,700 people in South Ayrshire were unemployed, an unemployment rate of 3.7% which is higher than the Scottish average unemployment rate of 3.5%.

Professional Occupations make up the largest employment figures based on occupation in South Ayrshire, with an estimated 8,900 people (20.0%) of the population employed in the area. Other large sectors of employment across South Ayrshire include the associate professional occupations sector (13.1%), the care, leisure and social care sector (10.2%) and managerial and directors occupations (9.1%).

The average gross weekly salary for a full time employee in South Ayrshire in 2023 was £753.40, higher than the Scottish average gross weekly salary figure of £702.40.

=== Tourism ===
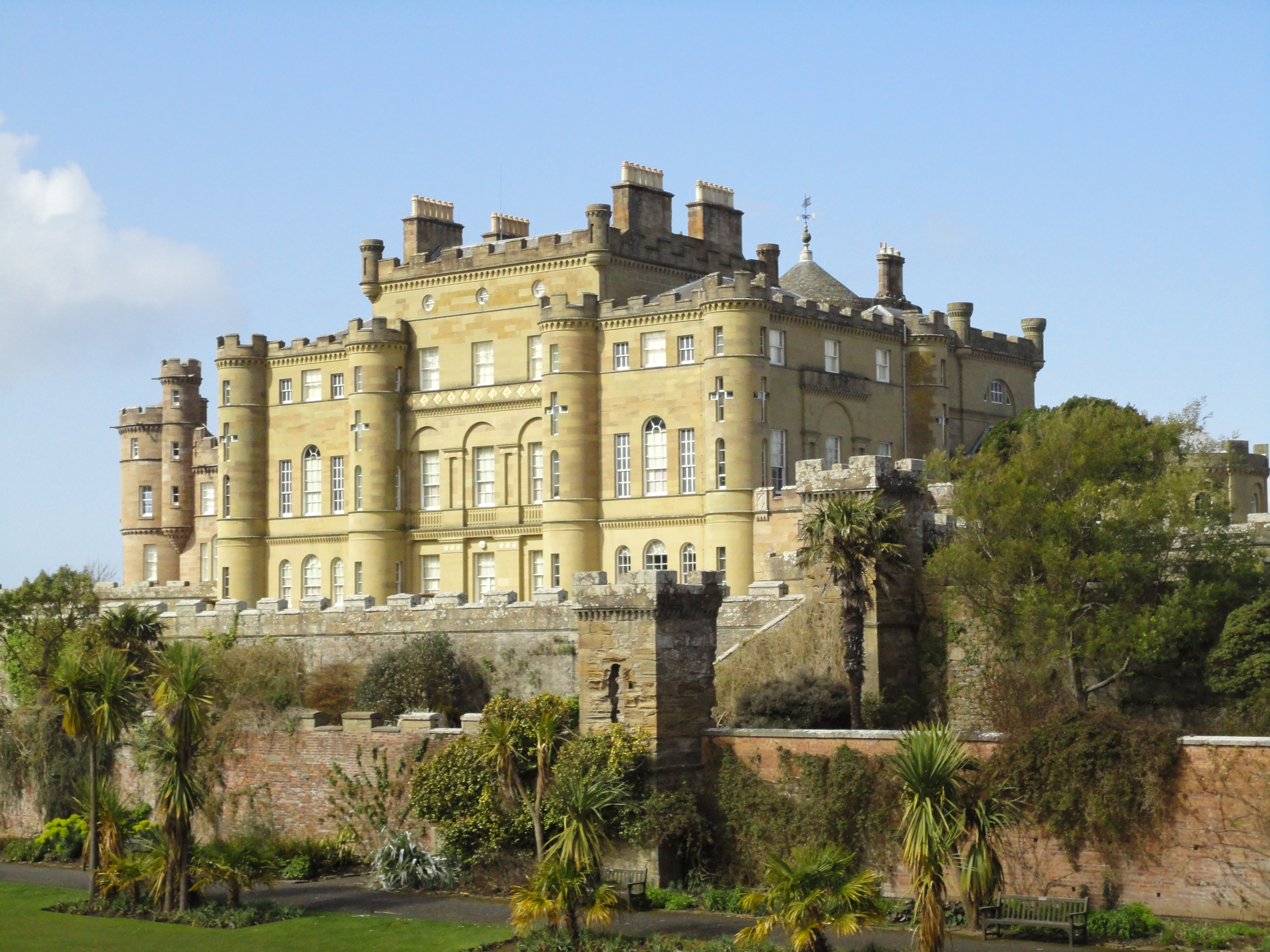
Culzean Castle & Palm Garden, a major tourist attraction in South Ayrshire

The tourism sector of South Ayrshire is a major contributor to the local economy, with the area having attractions including Burns Cottage, the Robert Burns Birthplace Museum, Turnberry Castle and Culzean Castle.

The Royal Troon Golf Club is featured on the rota of courses used for the Open Championship, with the most recent Open Championship being held at Royal Troon in 2024. Additionally, the Turnberry Golf Course has also hosted the Open Championship, the most recent being in 2009. However, since the course came under the ownership of Donald Trump, the 45th President of the United States, The R&A, the governing body for golf said following the 2021 storming of the United States Capitol, that it had "no plans to stage any of its competitions at Turnberry" and would not do so "until we are convinced that the focus will be on the championship, the players and the course itself".

Other notable places of interest within South Ayrshire include:

- Ailsa Craig
- Bachelor's Club, Tarbolton
- Bargany Gardens
- Blairquhan
- Burns Cottage
- Robert Burns Birthplace Museum (Robert Burns)
- Carrick Forest
- Crossraguel Abbey
- Culzean Castle
- Electric Brae
- Penkill Castle
- Souter Johnnie's Cottage
- Royal Troon Golf Club
- Turnberry Hotel and Golf Course

== Media ==
=== Television ===
In terms of television, South Ayrshire is served by:

- BBC Scotland (including television channels BBC One Scotland and BBC Scotland)
- STV (including television channel STV)
- BBC Reporting Scotland
- STV News (Central)
- ITV News Lookaround can also be received in southern parts.

=== Radio ===
Radio stations that broadcast to South Ayrshire are:

- BBC Radio Scotland on 93.9 FM
- Clyde 1 (Ayrshire) on 96.7 FM

=== Newspapers ===
Local newspaper is served by The Ayrshire Post.

== Education ==
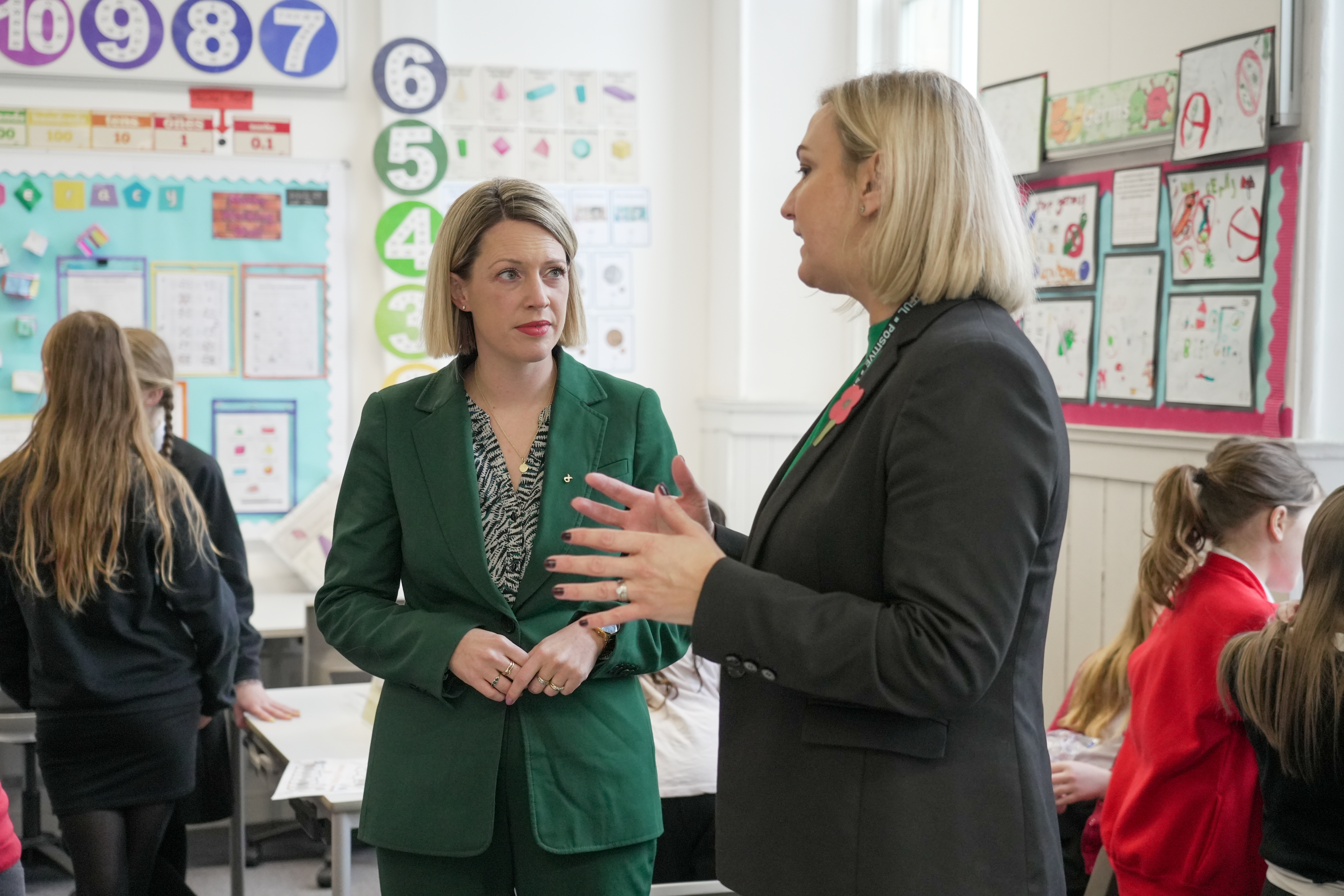
Director of Education Lyndsay McRoberts meets with Cabinet Secretary for Education Jenny Gilruth in Ayr, November 2024

The current Director of Education in South Ayrshire is Scott Mulholland, who was appointed in October 2025. Education provision in South Ayrshire is the responsibility of South Ayrshire Council, the local authority for the area, and is offered via eight secondary schools, forty primary schools, two special needs schools and thirty-six Early Years Centres. Between 2024–25, 7,383 and 6,313 attended primary and secondary schools in South Ayrshire respectively.

Belmont Academy is the largest secondary school in the area in terms of pupil enrolment, whilst in contrast, Carrick Academy has the smallest school roll, with a total of 391 pupils attending the school. A total of 7,441 children were enrolled in South Ayrshire's primary schools between 2023–2024, with Forehill Primary School having the largest pupil roll amongst the areas primary schools, with a total of 458 children attending the school. Straiton Primary School had the smallest pupil roll, with a total of 18 children attending the school in 2024.

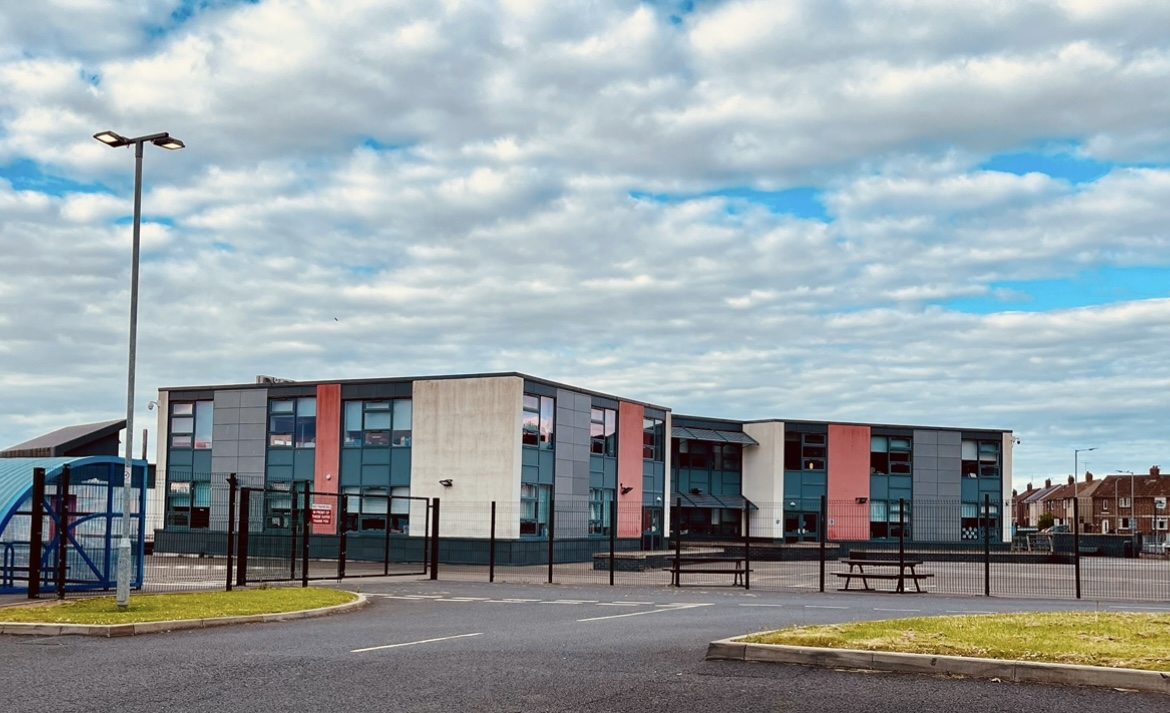
Forehill Primary School, the largest primary school

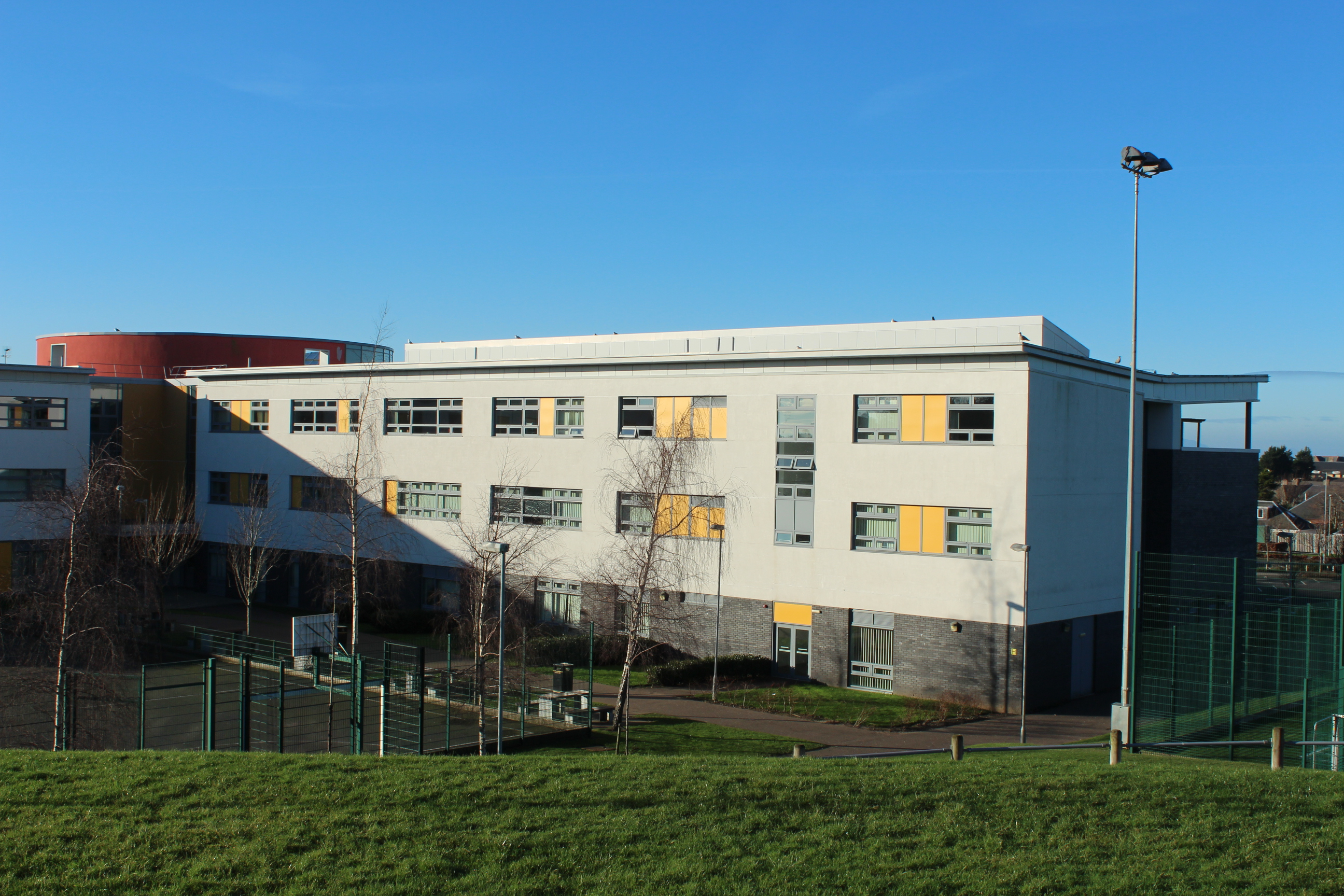
Belmont Academy, the largest secondary school

As of 2024, there are a total of eight secondary schools within South Ayrshire:

- Ayr Academy (Non-denominational, Ayr)
- Belmont Academy (Non-denominational, Ayr)
- Carrick Academy (Non-denominational, Maybole)
- Girvan Academy (Non-denominational, Girvan)
- Kyle Academy (Non-denominational, Ayr)
- Marr College (Non-denominational, Troon)
- Queen Margaret Academy (Roman Catholic, Ayr)
- Prestwick Academy (Non-denominational, Prestwick)

In addition to the eight secondary schools which are operated by South Ayrshire Council, Ayr is home to Wellington School, a private day school which educates children from 3–18.

== Governance ==
=== South Ayrshire Council ===
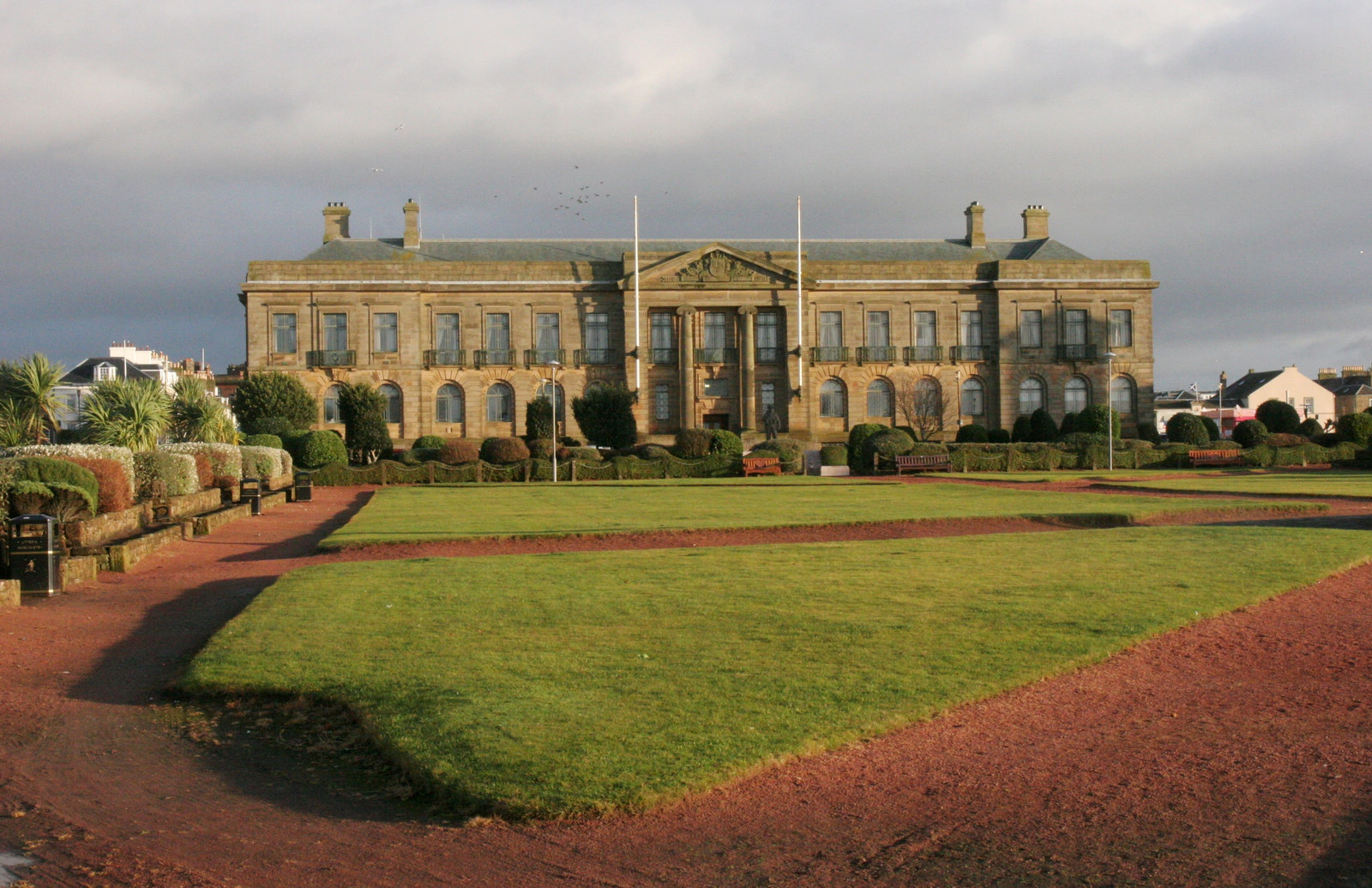
County Buildings, Ayr, the seat of South Ayrshire Council

South Ayrshire is governed by South Ayrshire Council which has been under no overall control since 2003, in which time various coalitions and minority administrations have operated. Since the last election in 2022, the council has been led by a Conservative minority administration which took office with support from two independent councillors and abstentions from Labour. The next election is due in 2027.

The council's civic head takes the title of provost. This is a largely ceremonial role, chairing council meetings and acting as the area's first citizen. Although an elected councillor, the provost is expected to be politically impartial. Political leadership is provided by the leader of the council.

The head of the councils operational service is the Chief Executive who works with the elected representatives of the council on matters concerning governance, legislation, policy and regulation. Additionally, the Chief Executive of the council is the lead officer during an emergency response as a result of an occurring significant civil emergency and also is the councils chief returning officer during parliamentary elections. The chief executive is supported by their depute.

=== Wider politics ===
At the 2014 Scottish independence referendum South Ayrshire rejected independence by an above-average margin of 57.9% "No" to 42.1% "Yes". With a turnout of 86.1%, there were 34,402 "Yes" votes and 47,247 "No" votes. Nationally 55.3% of voters voted "No" in the referendum compared to 44.7%, who voted "Yes" – resulting in Scotland remaining a devolved part of the United Kingdom.

At the 2016 United Kingdom European Union membership referendum a majority of voters in South Ayrshire voted for the United Kingdom to remain a member of the European Union (EU), with 59% of voters in South Ayrshire voting for the United Kingdom to remain a member of the EU and 41% voting for the United Kingdom to leave the European Union. With a turnout of 69.8%, 36,265 votes were cast for remain and 25,241 were cast for leave. 62% of Scottish voters voted remain whilst 38% voted leave, whilst nationally 51.8% of voters in the United Kingdom as a whole voting to leave and 48.2% voting to remain.

=== Parliamentary representation ===
UK Parliament

South Ayrshire forms part of two UK Parliamentary constituencies, listed below:

Constituency	Member	Party
Ayr, Carrick and Cumnock	Elaine Stewart	Scottish Labour Party
Central Ayrshire	Alan Gemmell	Scottish Labour Party

Scottish Parliament

Constituency MSPs
South Ayrshire forms part of two Scottish Parliamentary constituency seats, listed below:

Constituency	Member of Scottish Parliament		Extent of constituency
Ayr	Siobhian Brown	SNP	Covering Ayr, Prestwick and Troon.
Carrick, Cumnock and Doon Valley	Katie Hagmann	SNP	Covering Kyle and Carrick outside of Ayr, Prestwick and Troon, alongside Ballochmyle, Cumnock and Doon Valley in East Ayrshire.

Regional List MSPs
As part of the South Scotland electoral region, South Ayrshire is represented by 7 regional MSPs who are elected to represent the entire South Scotland region – all regional list MSPs elected for the South Scotland region are listed below:

Constituency	Member	Party
South Scotland	Sharon Dowey	Conservative
South Scotland	Emma Harper	Scottish National
South Scotland	Carol Mochan	Labour
South Scotland	Craig Hoy	Conservative
South Scotland	Brian Whittle	Conservative
South Scotland	Martin Whitfield	Labour
South Scotland	Colin Smyth	Labour
