= David Simpson (Scottish cricketer) =

Scottish cricketer

Personal information
- Full name: David John Simpson
- Born: 23 February 1961 (age 65); Irvine, Ayrshire, Scotland
- Batting: Right-handed

Domestic team information
- Years: Team
- 1984–1985: Scotland

Career statistics
| Competition | First-class | List A |
|---|---|---|
| Matches | 2 | 4 |
| Runs scored | 19 | 14 |
| Batting average | 6.33 | 3.50 |
| 100s/50s | –/– | –/– |
| Top score | 9 | 7 |
| Catches/stumpings | 1/– | –/– |
- Source: Cricinfo, 30 October 2022

David John Simpson (born 23 February 1961) is a Scottish former first-class cricketer.

Simpson was born at Irvine in February 1945 and was educated in Ayr at Belmont Academy. He played club cricket for Ayr, captaining the side on two occasions; the first in 1987, with the second period from 1993 to 1995. Simpson made his debut for Scotland in a first-class match against Ireland at Glasgow in 1984; he made a second first-class appearance against Ireland the following season at Dublin. He scored 19 runs in these matches, with a highest score of 9. The following season, he made four List A one-day appearances against English county opponents in the 1985 Benson & Hedges Cup. In his four one-day matches, he scored 14 runs with a highest score of 7. Outside of cricket, Simpson worked in the insurance industry.
