= David Alan Simpson =

English botanist

David Alan Simpson (born 1955) is an English botanist.
