= Jougs =

Metal collar formerly used as an instrument of punishment

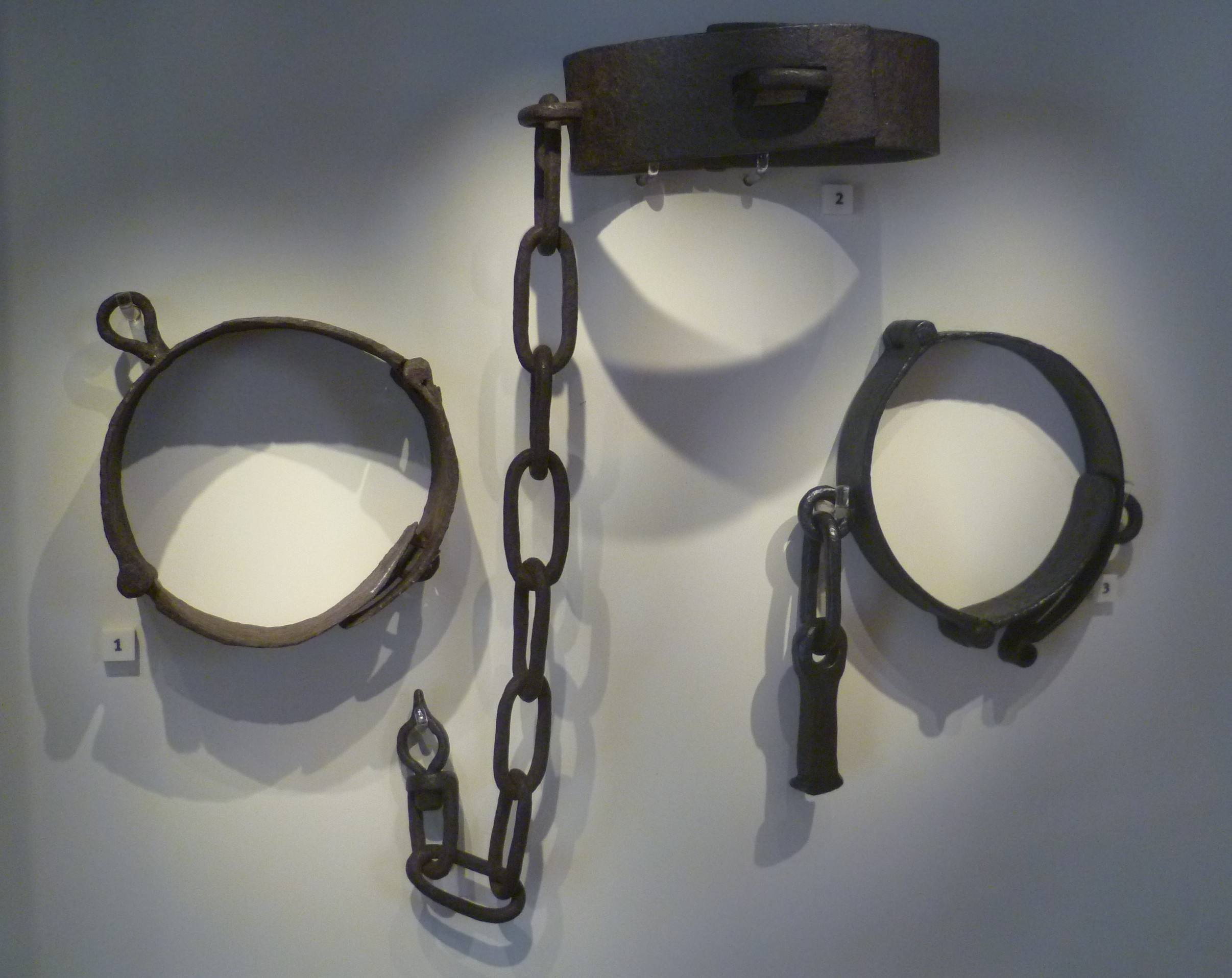
The Shrub Hill jougs, displayed in the National Museum of Scotland, Edinburgh

The jougs, juggs, or joggs (Old French: joug, from Latin iugum, a yoke) is a metal collar formerly used as an instrument of punishment in Scotland, the Netherlands and other countries. When the soldiers of Oliver Cromwell's army occupied Scotland, they were horrified at the church using such a punishment, and many were removed from church walls and destroyed.

== Purpose ==
The jougs was an iron collar fastened by a short chain to a wall, often of the parish church, or to a tree or mercat cross. The collar was placed around the offender's neck and fastened by a padlock. Time spent in the jougs was intended to shame an offender publicly. Jougs were used for ecclesiastical as well as civil offences. Some surviving examples can still be seen in their original locations in Scottish towns and villages. Jougs may be the origin of the later slang word "jug", meaning prison.

== Examples ==
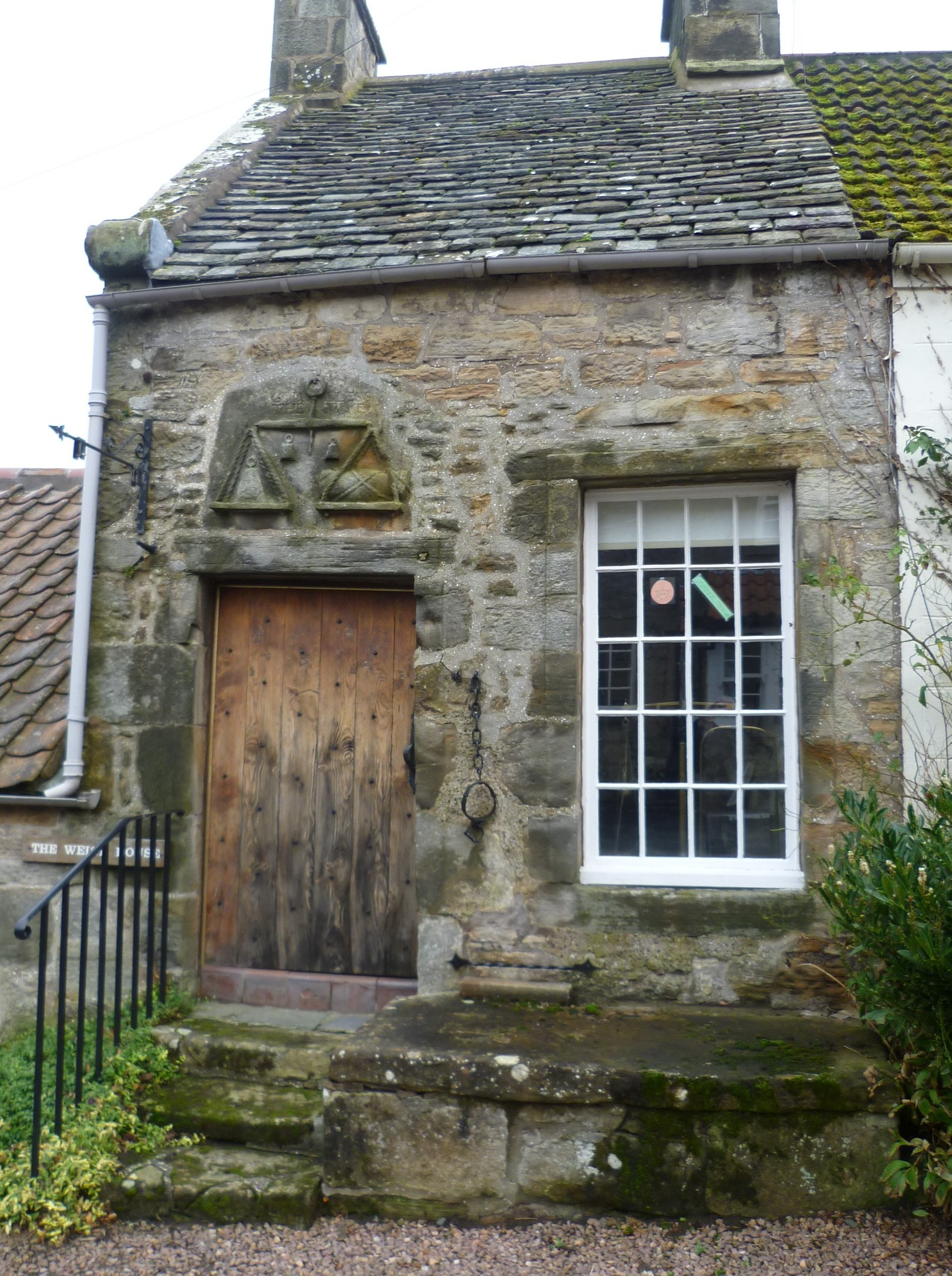
Jougs hanging by the door on the weigh-house at Ceres, Fife

Sir Walter Scott rescued the jougs from Threave Castle in Kirkcudbrightshire and attached them to the castellated gateway he built at Abbotsford House.

In Stewarton, East Ayrshire, the jougs were attached to the old bridge that crossed the burn and connected to the drive that ran up to Corsehill House.

The Sanquhar Tolbooth Museum in the Nith valley has jougs attached to the wall just outside the entrance to the old gaol.

The jougs at Sorn Kirk were stolen in the 1930s, but located and returned. Cuthbertson refers to the jougs as "symbols of the session's power against gossips and evil-doers".

The jougs at Kilallan Kirk near Kilmacolm were stolen and by chance retrieved and donated to the local museum. A story is told of a lady of short stature who was placed in the jougs; however, she fell off the box and was strangled, as the chain was too short for her.

The jougs on the Isle of Cumbrae survive, attached to a gatepost at the entrance to the Millport Old Cemetery.

The "Clachan Oak" is an ancient sessile oak near Balfron in Stirlingshire. It can still be seen bearing metal bands around its trunk to which jougs were once attached for the restraint and humiliation of petty criminals.

Mr. Carse of the Shawhill Estate protected a fine old thorn tree that grew at the Hurlford Bridge end by attaching a pair of jougs to it, made by David Brown the local blacksmith. These were never used, but acted as a deterrent to local children who might have harmed the tree.

== Gallery ==
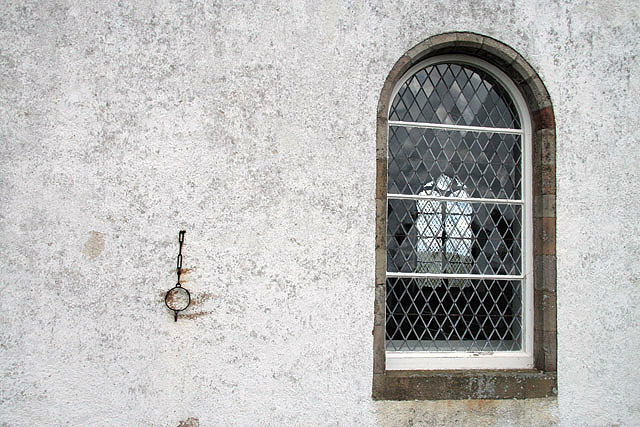
Jougs at Oxnam Parish Kirk, Scottish Borders

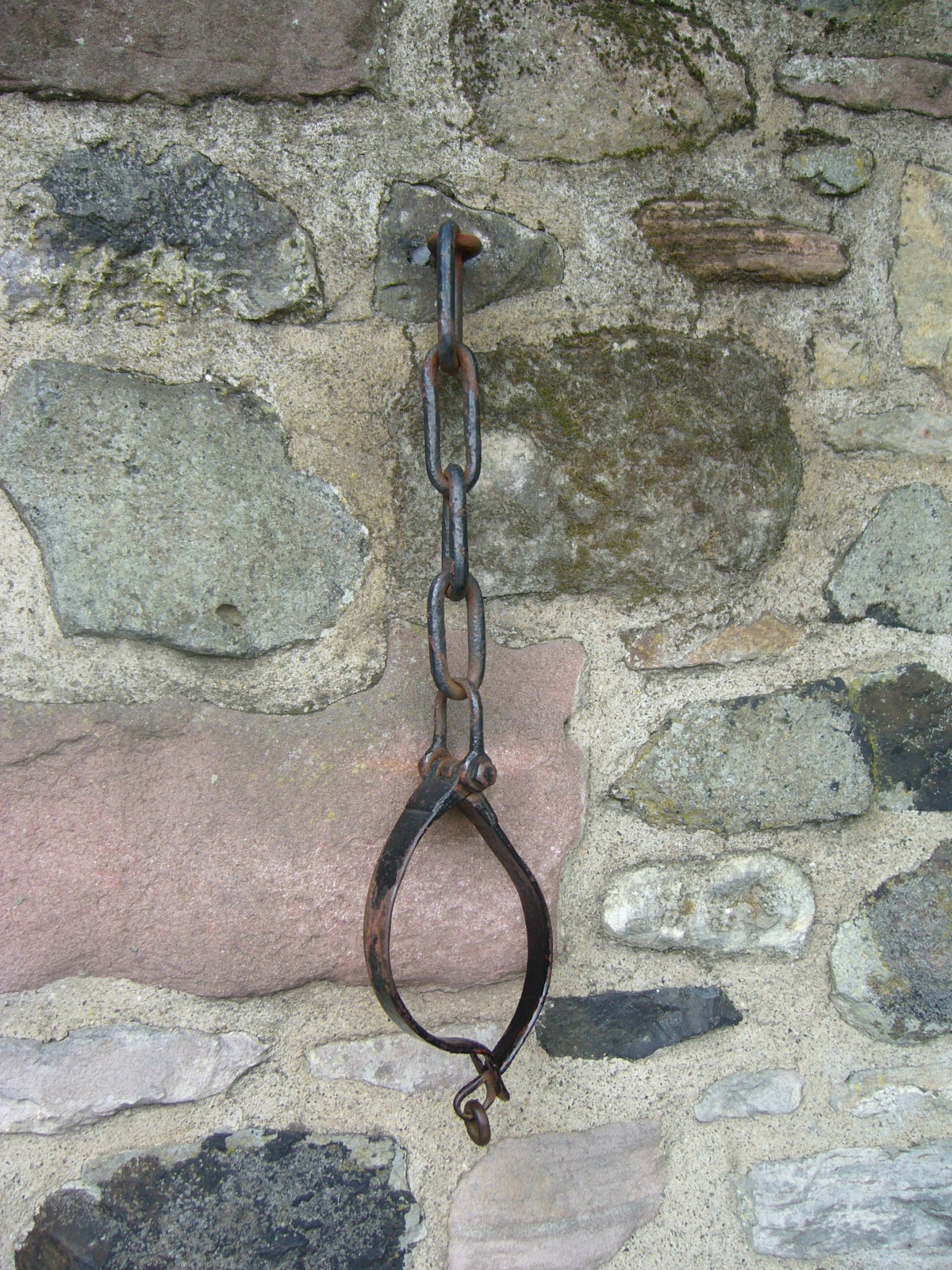
Jougs on the perimeter wall of Duddingston Kirk, near Edinburgh

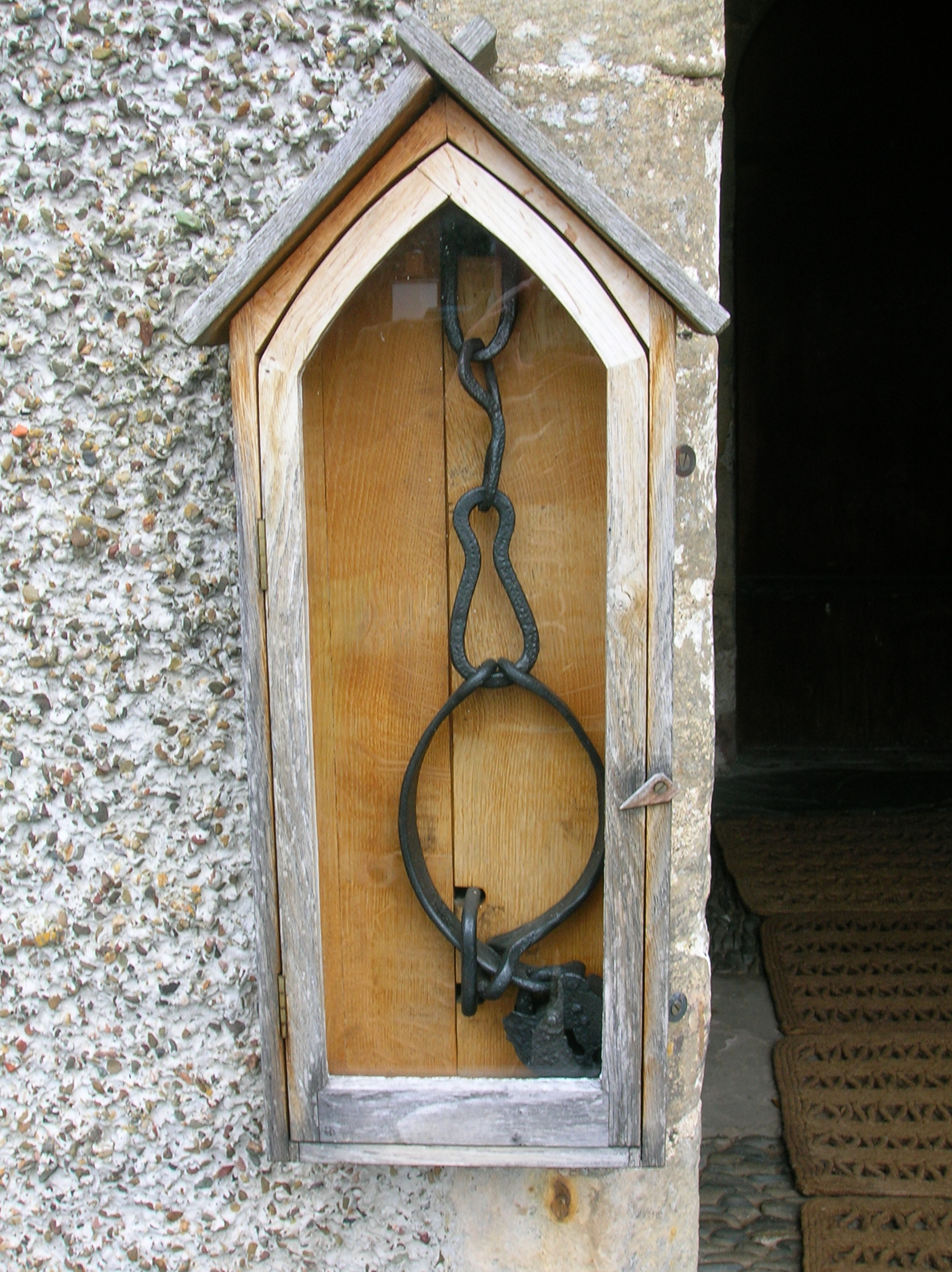
Jougs at Stobo Kirk, Scottish Borders

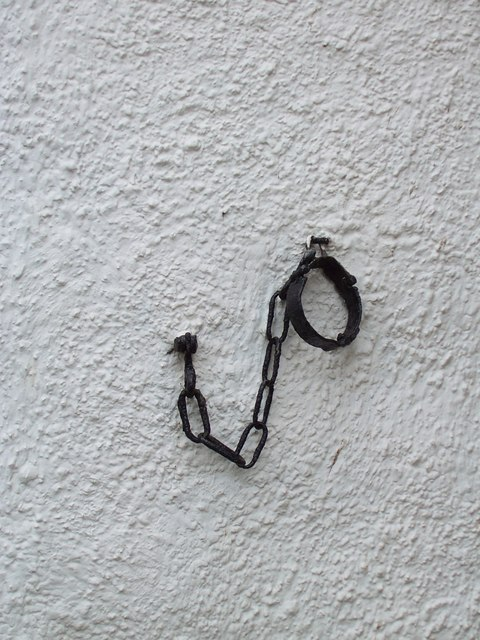
Jougs attached to the tolbooth at Kilmaurs, Ayrshire

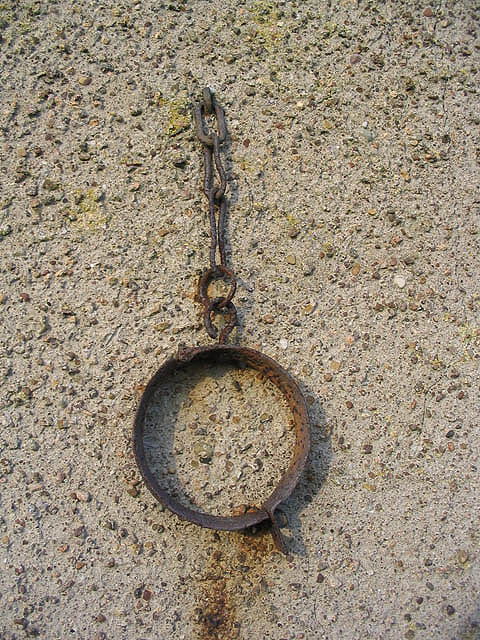
Jougs at Eckford Parish Kirk, Scottish Borders

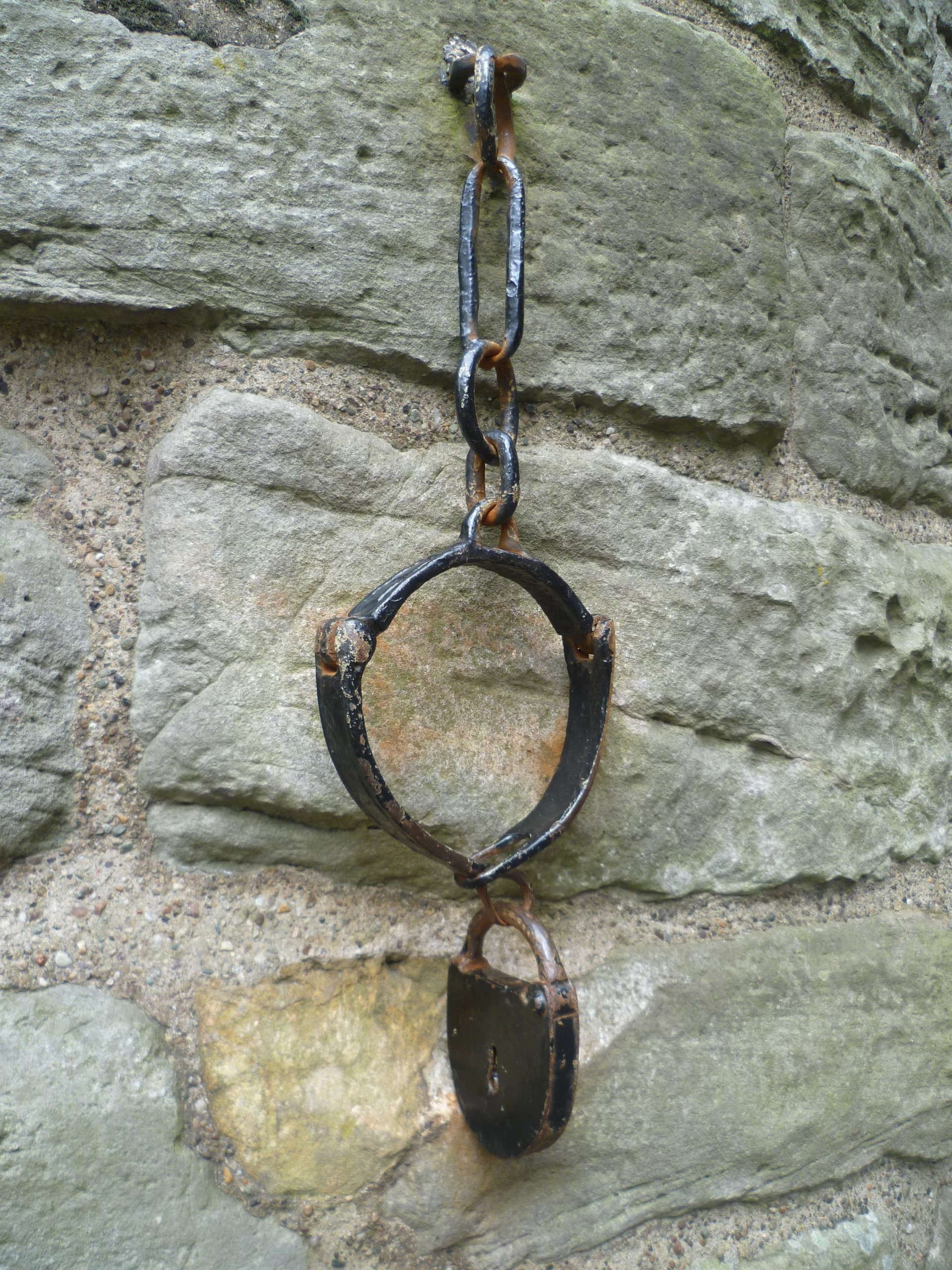
Jougs at the entrance to the parish kirk in Abernethy, Perthshire

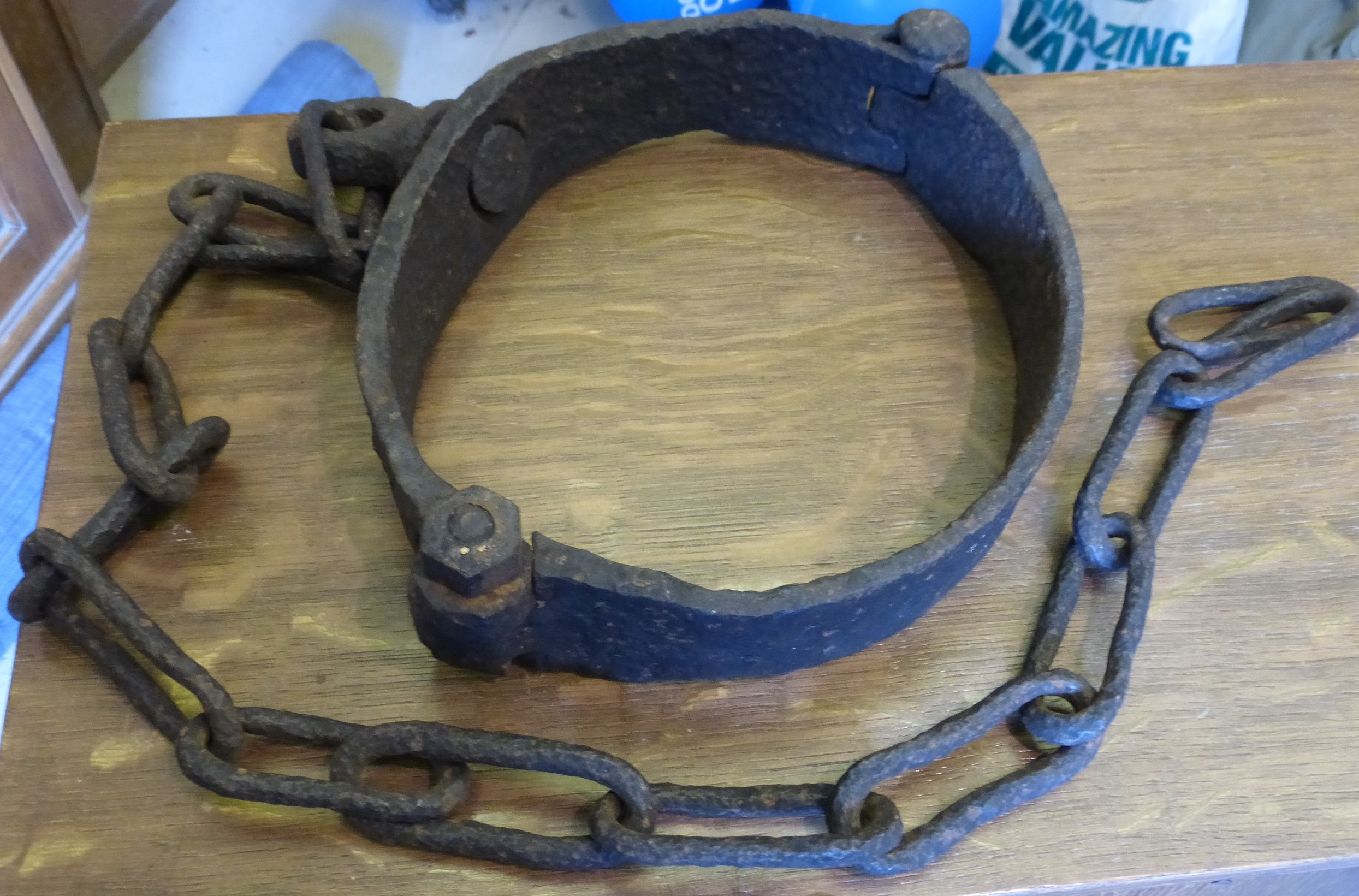
Jougs of South Leith Parish Church

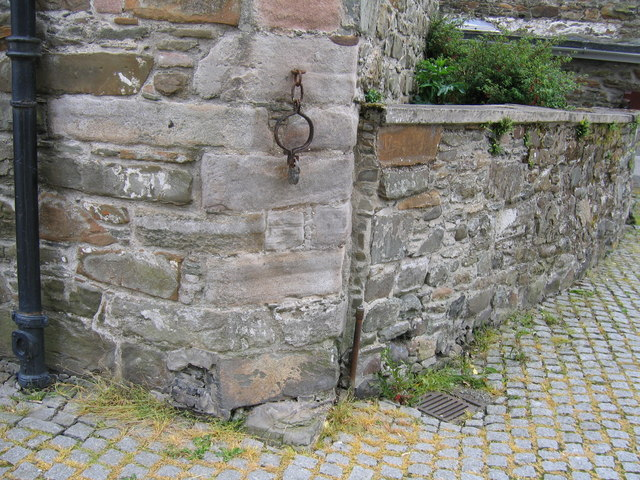
Jougs attached to Kirkcudbright Tolbooth, Kirkcudbrightshire

== See also ==
- Scold's bridle
- Shrew's fiddle
- Stool of repentance
