= Mossgiel Tunnel Platform railway station =

Railway station in East Ayrshire, Scotland

Mossgiel Tunnel Platform
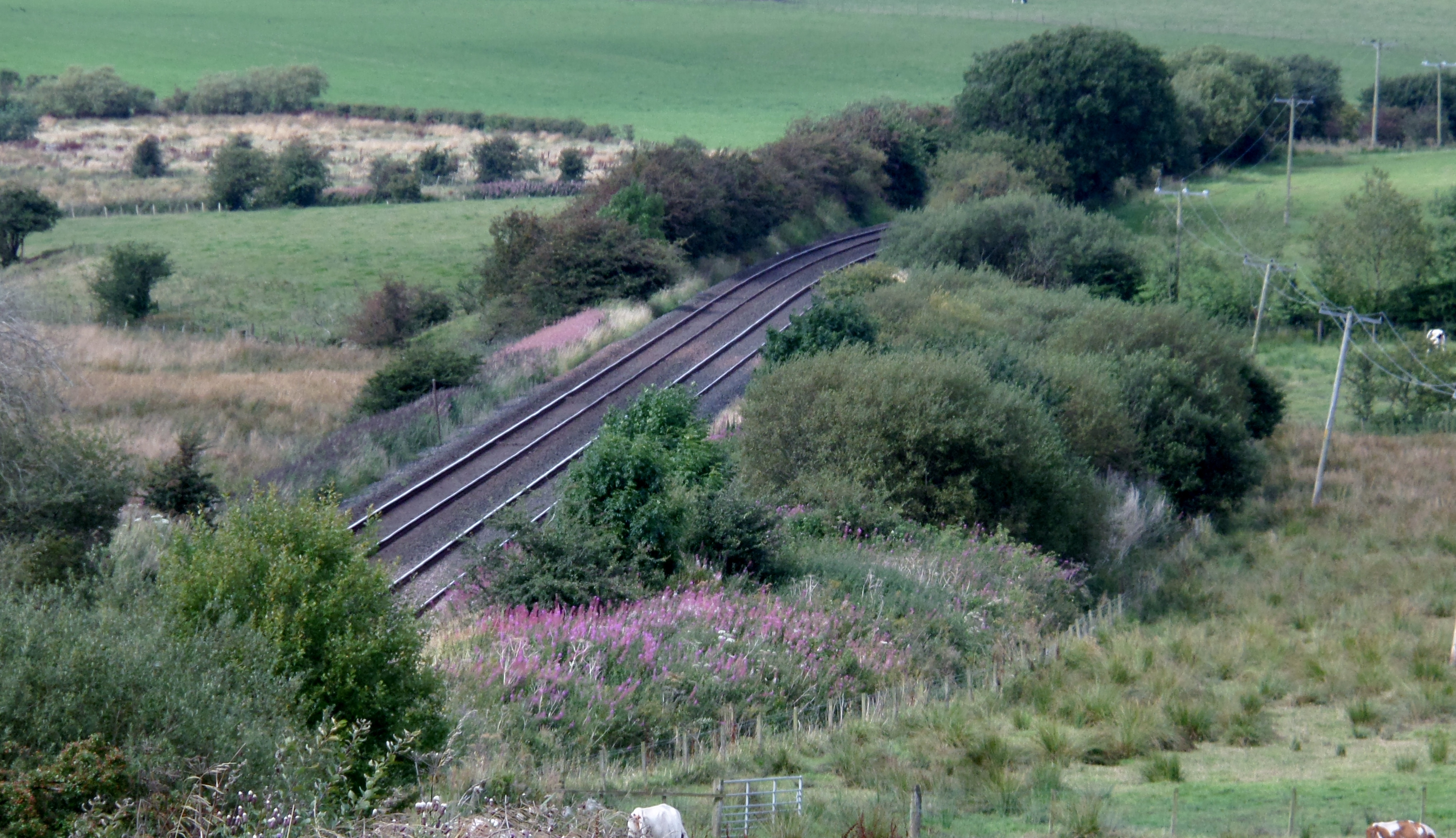
- Mossgiel Tunnel north portal, site of the old station and the mineral siding to Mauchline Colliery.

General information
- Location: Near Mauchline, Ayrshire; Scotland
- Coordinates: 55.5329°N 4.4089°W
- Grid reference: NS2142
- Platforms: 1

Other information
- Status: Disused

History
- Pre-grouping: G&SWR
- Post-grouping: LMS

Key dates
- After 1896: Opened
- After July 1926: Closed
Location

Mossgiel Tunnel Platform railway station (NS480292) was not a station constructed for public use. It stood close to the northern portal of the 680 yard Mossgiel Tunnel that runs under the Mossgiel Ridge and Skeoch Hill north of Mauchline, East Ayrshire, Scotland. It may have solely served the transportation requirements of the Glasgow and South-Western Railway and its successor in connection with the carriage of workers involved in the ongoing maintenance and/or the major reconstruction of Mossgiel Tunnel that took place between 1925 and 1927. It was not recorded in the 1896 G&SWR working time table and had closed sometime after July 1926.

Garrochburn Goods Depot once stood near by on the B744 to the north, 6.82 from Kilmarnock and 2.72 from Mauchline. A line to Mauchline Colliery branched off close to the site of the station that opened in 1925 and closed to all traffic in February 1974 after serving as a coal washery for around 5 years after the colliery closed in 1969.

== Infrastructure and working ==
The OS maps of 1895 shows only Garrochburn signal box and signals in the area with a reservoir on the western side of the line and a small building opposite it on the eastern side in the immediate vicinity of the station site. By the 1920s only minor infrastructure was present with the double track main line and one siding running off to a loading dock to the west. Several semaphore signal posts and cross over points were present with runaway points located in the up line about 400yds towards Hurlford from the signal box.

The siding at Garrochburn was also used as a coal siding for coal traffic to or from the nearby Mauchline Colliery. The gradient from Kilmarnock eased at Garrochburn Goods depot before a gentle descent into Mauchline following the passage through Mossgiel or Skeoch Tunnel.

== History ==
The goods depot at Garrochburn was opened by the Glasgow and South-Western Railway in the 1920s and closed on 4 October 1965. Its construction may have been originally have been related to the reconstruction of Mossgiel Tunnel in the mid-1920s. Apart from farm traffic and the possible link with the reconstruction and relining of Mossgiel Tunnel the siding at Garrochburn was also used as a coal siding for coal traffic connected with the siding to Mauchline Colliery.

As stated Mossgiel Tunnel Platform stood close by to the south, and had closed at some point after July 1926 by the LMS when the reconstruction of Mossgiel Tunnel had been completed. The station had only a single platform as the line itself had been singled during the work on the tunnel. A temporary signal box had been established to control the southern access to the tunnel during the relining.

== The site today ==
The siding to Mauchline Colliery has been lifted and much of the track bed has grassed over. No remnants of the station are visible however the likely site is discernable as a wide area on the verge of the line.

== See also ==
- Glenfalloch Platform railway station
- Garrochburn Goods Depot
- Mennock Lye Goods Depot

Preceding station	Historical railways	Following station
Mauchline; Line and station open	Glasgow and South Western Railway; Glasgow, Paisley, Kilmarnock and Ayr Railway	Hurlford; Line and station open
