= Robert Service =

Robert Service may refer to:

- Robert Service (historian) (born 1947), British historian
- Robert Service (naturalist) (1855–1911), British naturalist
- Robert W. Service (1874–1958), British-Canadian poet and writer
- Robert Service High School in Anchorage, Alaska, named for Robert W. Service
- Robert Service School, a grade school in Dawson City, Yukon, Canada
