= Mauchline railway station =

Former railway station in Scotland

Coordinates: 55.5090°N 4.3814°W

Mauchline

General information
- Location: Mauchline, Ayrshire; Scotland
- Platforms: 4

Other information
- Status: Disused

History
- Original company: Glasgow, Paisley, Kilmarnock and Ayr Railway
- Pre-grouping: Glasgow and South Western Railway

Key dates
- 9 August 1848: Opened as Mauchline
- By 1887: Renamed as Mauchline for Catrine
- 1903: Renamed as Mauchline
- 6 December 1965: Closed
Location

Mauchline railway station was a railway station serving the town of Mauchline, East Ayrshire, Scotland. The station was originally part of the Glasgow, Paisley, Kilmarnock and Ayr Railway.

== History ==
The station opened on 9 August 1848. It was renamed Mauchline for Catrine by 1887, and renamed back to Mauchline in 1903. The station closed to passengers on 6 December 1965.

Today this line is still open as part of the Glasgow South Western Line.

The Garrochburn Goods Depot lay a few miles to the north and until circa 1926 a Mossgiel Tunnel Platform was located just to the north of the tunnel mouth on the Hurlford side.

An active group, “Mauchline Train Station Campaign” is advocating reopening of the station.

Preceding station	Historical railways	Following station
Tarbolton; Line open; station closed	Glasgow and South Western Railway; Ayr to Mauchline Branch	Connection with GPK&AR at Mauchline Junction
Auchinleck	Glasgow and South Western Railway; Glasgow, Paisley, Kilmarnock and Ayr Railway	Hurlford; Line open; station closed
Catrine; Line and station closed	Glasgow and South Western Railway; Catrine Branch	Connection with GPK&AR at Brownhill Junction
