= Robert Service (naturalist) =

British nurseryman and naturalist (1854–1911)

- Born: 23 May 1854; Netherplace, Ayrshire, Scotland
- Died: 8 May 1911 (aged 56)
- Occupations: Nurseryman; naturalist

Robert Service (1854–1911) was a British nurseryman and naturalist.

== Biography ==
Robert Service was born 23 May 1854 in Netherplace, near Mauchline, Ayrshire. His father was a gardener there. For a short time the family lived near Carlisle, and when Robert was at the age of three, his father settled in Dumfries and founded a nursery business there. Robert was educated at the Old Free Church School, Davidstreet, Maxwelltown under Master William Fairley and started working in his fathers nursery.

Robert Service lived most of his live in Maxwelltown, Dumfries.

He used the pen name "Zoologicus", and later "Mable Moss".

In 1879 he married a daughter of Mrs. Glendinning of Maxwelltown. They had two sons and three daughters.

Service died on 8 May 1911.

== Naturalist ==
From 1870 to 1882 Robert Service was the secretary of the Dumfriesshire and Galloway Natural History and Antiquarian Society. He was a so-called 'reconstitution member.' This indicates that he was elected at the reconstitution meeting of 3 November 1876. At this meeting he was also elected an honorary Secretary. In 1902 he was appointed Vice-President; in 1907 he became honorary Vice-President. On 20 January 1911 he was appointed honorary member.

He was also a member of the British Ornithological Union, of the Edinburgh Field Naturalists' and Microscopic Society, of the Natural History Society of Glasgow, of the Andersonian Society, Glasgow and of the British Association for the Advancement of Science. He was a corresponding member of the Yorkshire Naturalists' Club.

Around 1900 Service had become the major influence of natural history for the Dumfries and Galloway Region (especially on birds and butterflies).

== Bibliography ==
Among the publications of Robert Service are:

- 1875: 'Cirrcedia xerampelina in Scotland,' in: The Entomologist, vol. 8, p. 282.
- 1879: 'Colias edusa in 1877,' in: Transactions of Dumfriesshire and Galloway Natural History and Antiquarian Society, series 2, vol. 1, pp. 54–59.
- 1885: 'Disappearance of the Chough (Pyrrhocorax graculus, L.) from the Stewartry of Kirkcudbright' (read 28 April 1885), in: Proceedings and Transactions of the Natural History Society of Glasgow, n.s. vol. 1 (1883–1886), pp. 117–122.
- 1887: 'On the former existence of Ptarmigan in South-West Scotland,' in: The Zoologist, 3rd series, vol. 11, p. 81–89.
- 1892: 'Freshwater Fishes of the Solway Area,' in: Annals of Scottish Natural History, 1892, pp. 18–25.
- 1894: 'Charaeas graminis in southern Scotland,' in: The Entomologist, vol. 27, pp. 278–282.
- 1895: 'The Starling in Solway,' in: Annals of Scottish Natural History, 1895, pp. 92–96.
- 1896: 'Bird-migration and Insect Life in the Solway District in the Autumn of 1895,' in: Annals of Scottish Natural History, vol. 5, pp. 98–99.
- 1901: 'The Vertebrates of Solway: A century's changes,' in: Transactions of the Dumfriesshire and Galloway Natural History and Antiquarian Society, series II, vol. 17, p. 15–31.
- 1908: 'Death's-head Moth in Kirkcudbrightshire,' in: Annals of Scottish Natural History, vol. 17, p. 186.
- 1911: 'Notes on the British Starling' (read 28 January 1910), in: Transactions of Dumfries and Galloway Natural History and Antiquarian Society, n.s. vol. 22, pp. 100–103.

== Sources ==
- 'Robert Service, naturalist (1855–1911),' in: Gallovidian, vol. XIII, no. 50 (summer 1911), pp. 62–64
- 'The late Mr. Robert Service,' in: Dumfries and Galloway Standard, 10 May 1911.
- Hugh S. Gladstone – 'In Memoriam: Robert Service,' in: Annals of Scottish Natural History, no. 79 (July 1911), p. 129.
