= Garrochburn Goods Depot =

Railway Freight Facility in Scotland

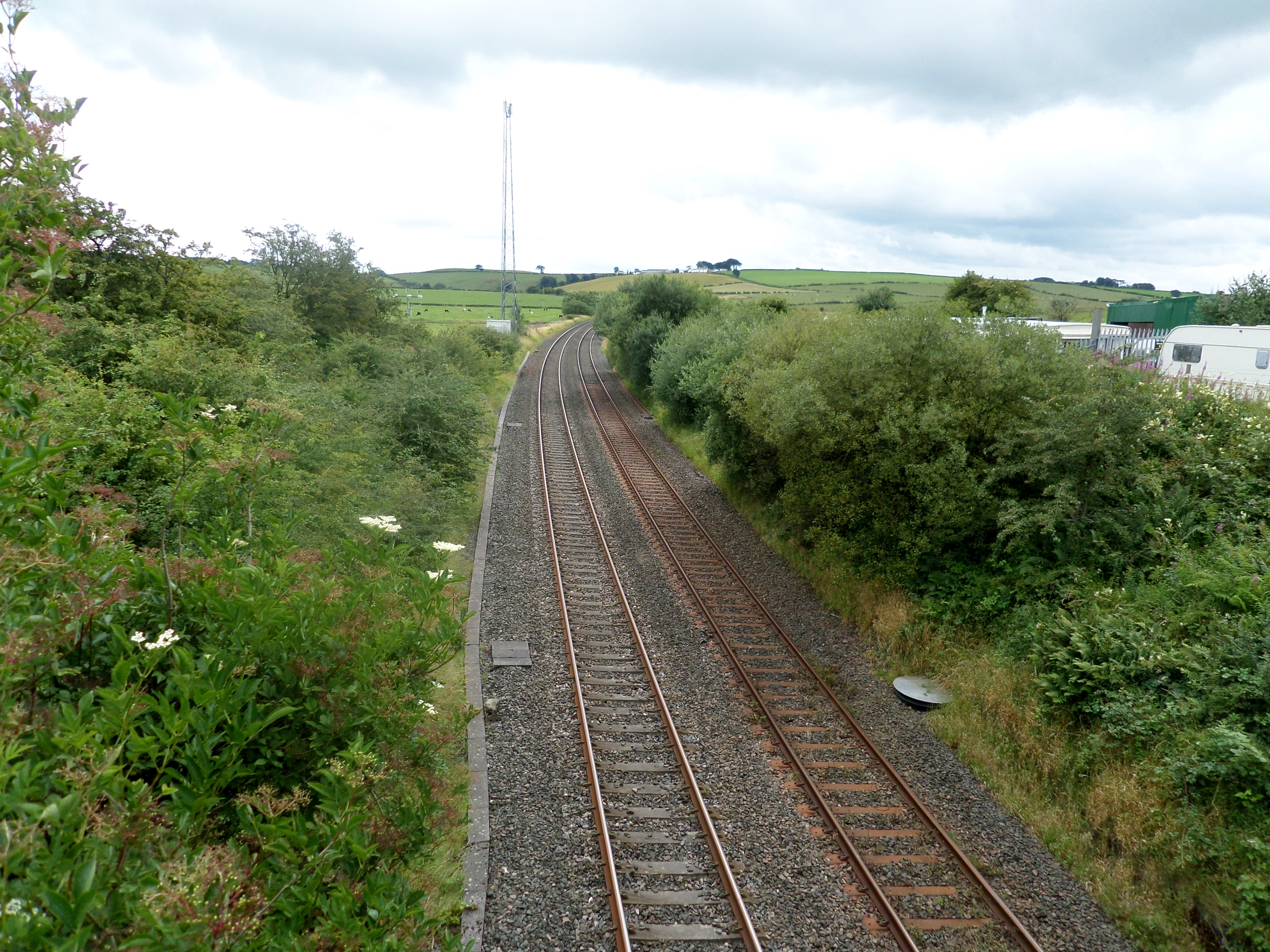
- The site of Garrochburn Goods Depot

General information
- Location: Near Mauchline, Ayrshire; Scotland
- Coordinates: 55.543°N 4.411°W
- Grid reference: NS479304
- Platforms: 0

Other information
- Status: Disused

History
- Original company: GPK&A
- Pre-grouping: G&SWR
- Post-grouping: LMS

Key dates
- Circa 1928: Opened
- 4 October 1965.: Goods services withdrawn
Location

Garrochburn Goods Depot or Garrochburn Siding was a railway freight facility located off the B744 near the hamlet of Crosshands that lies north-west of Mauchline, East Ayrshire, Scotland. It served the industrial and agricultural requirements for transportation in the vicinity of Crosshands and the surrounding rural area, originally on behalf of the Glasgow and South-Western Railway. Garrochburn Goods Depot was 40.4 miles (65.0 km) from Glasgow, 6.82 miles (10.98 km) from Kilmarnock and 2.72 miles (4.38 km) from Mauchline. The old clachan of Ladeside once stood nearby and the mill at Dalsangan remains as a private house having lost its water supply upon the draining of Loch Brown when the railway was built, that is apart from that of the Garroch or Ladeside Burn that cuts under the railway to the south of the old siding.

Although a remote location today the facility would have served freight transport requirements in the form of such items as lime for the fields, cattle, horse and sheep movements, milk delivery, coal transport movements and related items, etc. with other sidings in the vicinity, namely the line to Mauchline Colliery that opened in 1925 and closed to all traffic in February 1974 after serving as a coal washery for around five years after the colliery closed in 1969.

== Infrastructure and working ==
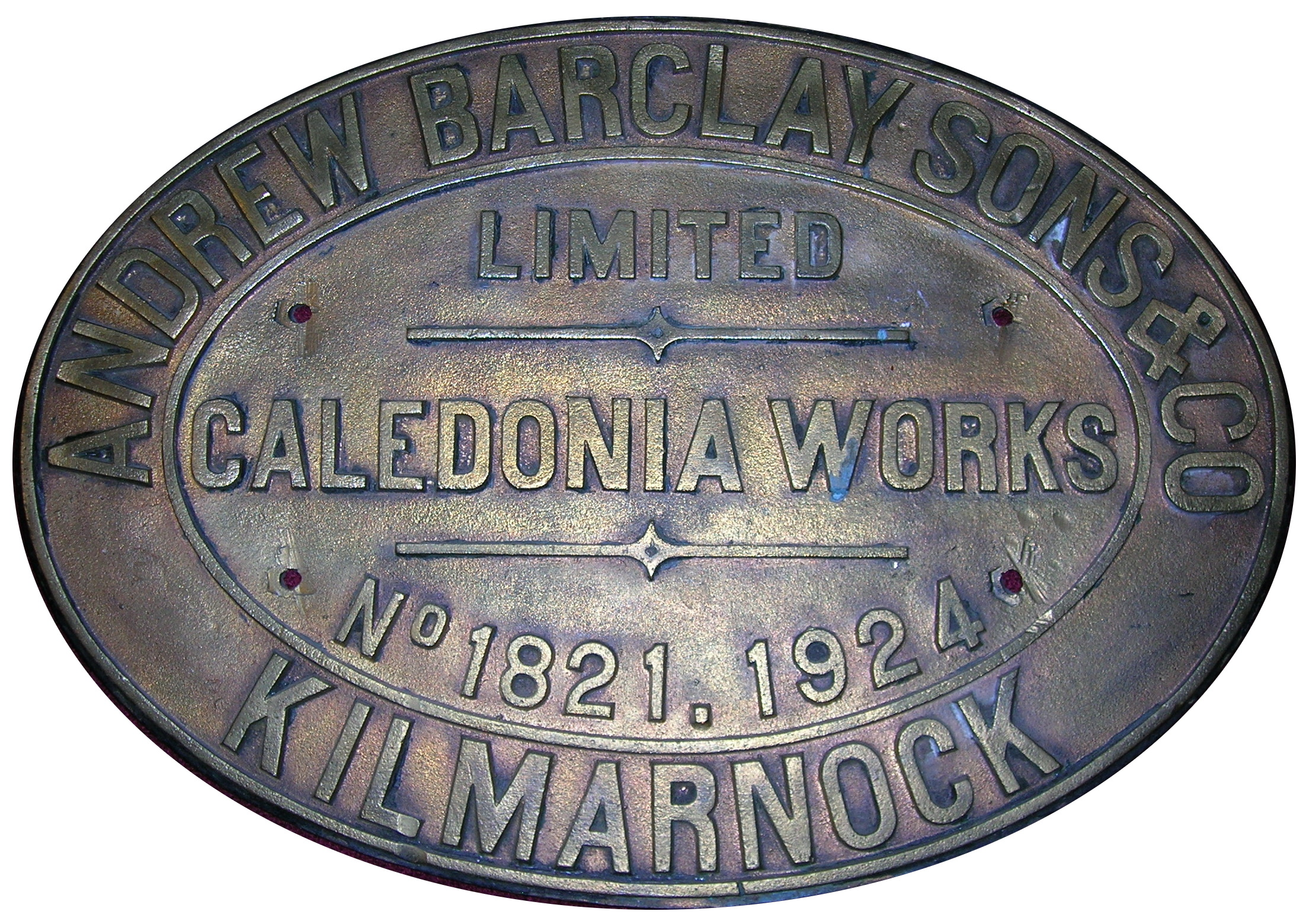
Works plate from a locomotive that once worked at Mauchline Colliery.

The OS maps of 1895 shows only a signal box and signals at the location. By the 1920s only minor infrastructure was present as might be expected at such a remote location with the double track main line, one siding running off to a loading dock to the west, a weighing machine, small buildings and an access off the B744 road to Crosshands with a road over bridge. The signal box or cabin was situated on the eastern side of the main line with several semaphore signal posts and cross over points were present with runaway points located in the up line about 400 yards (370 m) towards Hurlford from the signal box. In 1898 the signal box was staffed day and night during the week and from 7.30am to 8pm on Sundays. The G&SWR Permanent Way Department was responsible for the cleaning of the points and signals rather than staff from Mauchline railway station.

Outward traffic in 1898 was collected by up trains and taken to Mauchline. Down trains could not call to collect traffic however they were permitted to detach traffic if the following instructions were followed :- "Traffic for the siding must be marshalled next the engine leaving Mauchline. On arrival at Garrochburn, and before uncoupling the train, the guard must apply the van brake in rear, and in addition must put one or more sprags in the wheels of the foremost wagons of the train to be left on the down line, so as to prevent the possibility of the train moving forward after the engine has left it. When the wagons are being run into the siding the engine must stand on the up line clear of the crossing until the wagons have passed into the siding clear of the catch point."

The signal box was open 'day and night' except for Sundays when it closed from 7.30am to 8.30am on Mondays. It had a 'switching out' facility and lay 2 miles and 50 chains from the Mauchline No 1 box.

The siding at Garrochburn was also used as a coal siding for coal traffic to or from the nearby Mauchline Colliery.

The gradient from Kilmarnock eased at Garrochburn Goods depot before a gentle descent into Mauchline following the passage through Mossgiel or Skeoch Tunnel.

== History ==
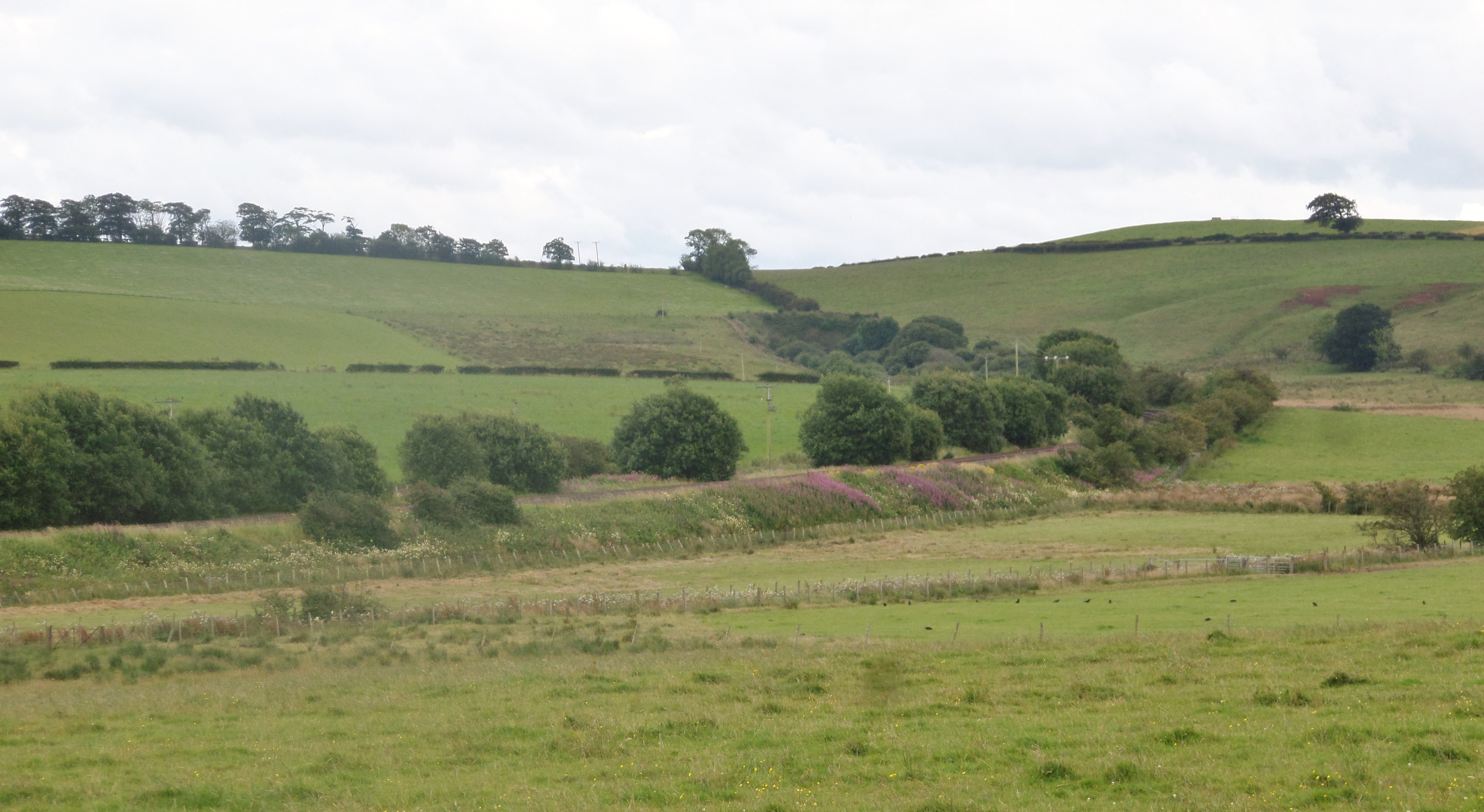
The depot site, Mossgiel Tunnel portal and the site of the old embankment and mineral siding to Mauchline Collliery.

The goods depot at Garrochburn was opened by the Glasgow and South-Western Railway in the 1920s and closed on 4 October 1965. Its construction may have been related to the reconstruction of Mossgiel Tunnel in the mid-1920s. It was registered as providing facilities for goods and livestock.

The line was opened by the Glasgow, Paisley, Kilmarnock and Ayr Railway, then joining the Glasgow and South-Western Railway it became part of the London Midland and Scottish Railway (LMS) during the Grouping of 1923 and finally part of British Railways in 1948.

Mossgiel Tunnel Platform stood nearby, closed at some point after July 1926 by the LMS when the reconstruction of Mossgiel Tunnel had been completed.

Apart from farm traffic and the possible link with the reconstruction of Mossgiel Tunnel the siding at Garrochburn was also used as a coal siding for coal traffic connected with the siding to Mauchline Colliery. The working timetable of October 1913 makes reference to 'Garrochburn Platform' with the 05.50 from Dumfries to St Enoch stopping to collect milk traffic at 08.40.

== The site today ==
The siding has long been removed as have the signal box, track cross-over, weighing machine, etc. leaving plain double track. The railway border of the site is now bordered by trees and the entrance of the B744 has a private sign that reads 'Garrochburn Sidings' and the area is at present (2017) used for storing mobile caravans, etc.

== See also ==
- Loch Brown
- Gree Goods station
- Lissens Goods station
- Mennock Lye Goods Depot

Preceding station	Historical railways	Following station
Mauchline; Line and station open	Glasgow and South Western Railway; Glasgow, Paisley, Kilmarnock and Ayr Railway	Hurlford; Line and station open
