= Colin Douglas =

Colin Douglas may refer to:

- Colin Douglas (novelist) (born 1945), Scottish novelist
- Colin Douglas (actor) (1912–1991), English actor
- Colin Douglas (footballer) (born 1962), former Scottish footballer
