= Catrine railway station =

Railway station in East Ayrshire, Scotland

Coordinates: 55.50268°N 4.32675°W

Catrine
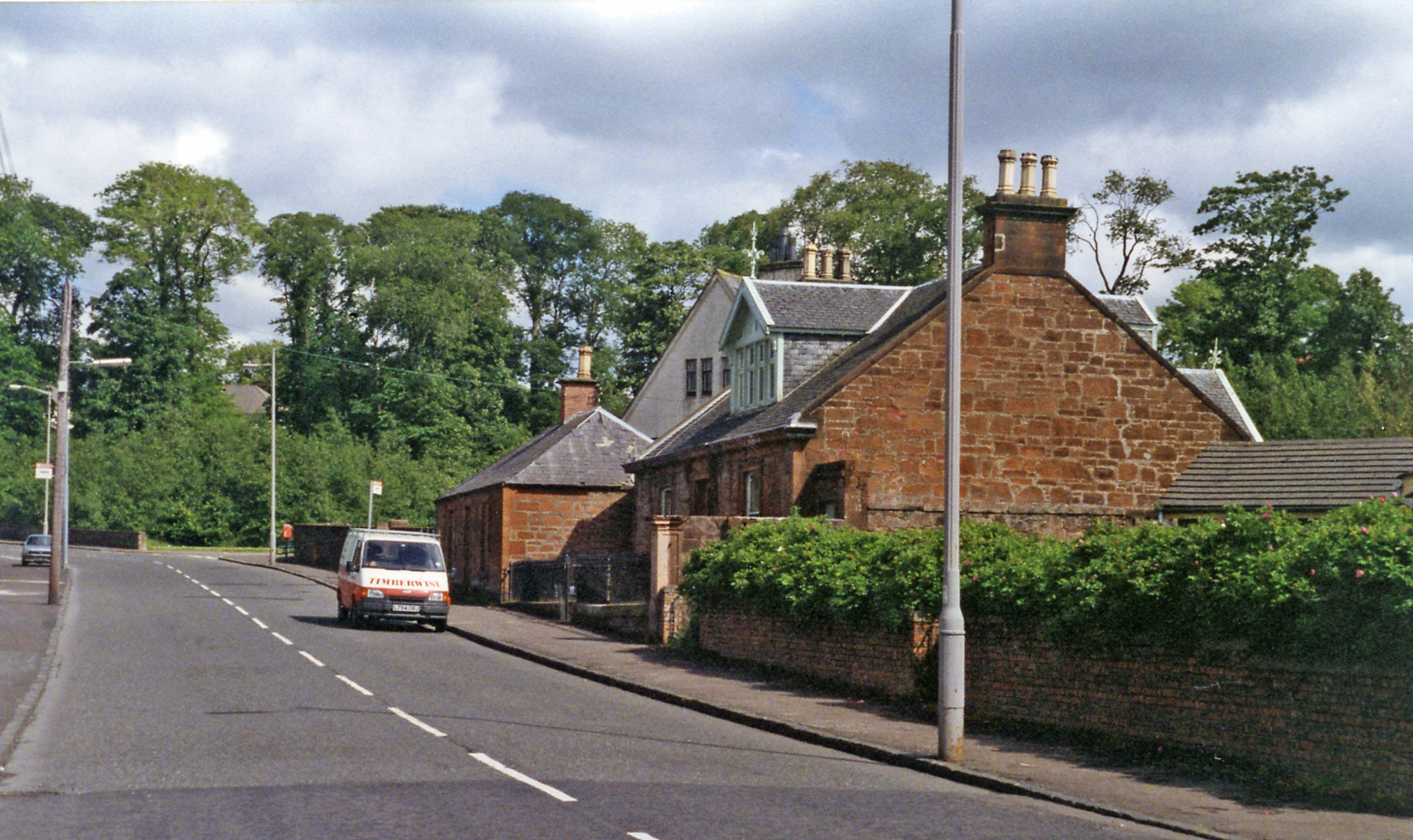
- Location of the former station

General information
- Location: Catrine, East Ayrshire; Scotland

Other information
- Status: Disused

History
- Pre-grouping: Glasgow and South Western Railway

Key dates
- 1 September 1903: Opened
- 3 May 1943: Closed
Location

Catrine railway station served the village of Catrine in East Ayrshire, Scotland. Open 1903–1943, except for a temporary closure, the station was the only one on the Catrine branch line of the Glasgow and South Western Railway (G&SWR).

== History ==
=== Proposal and construction ===
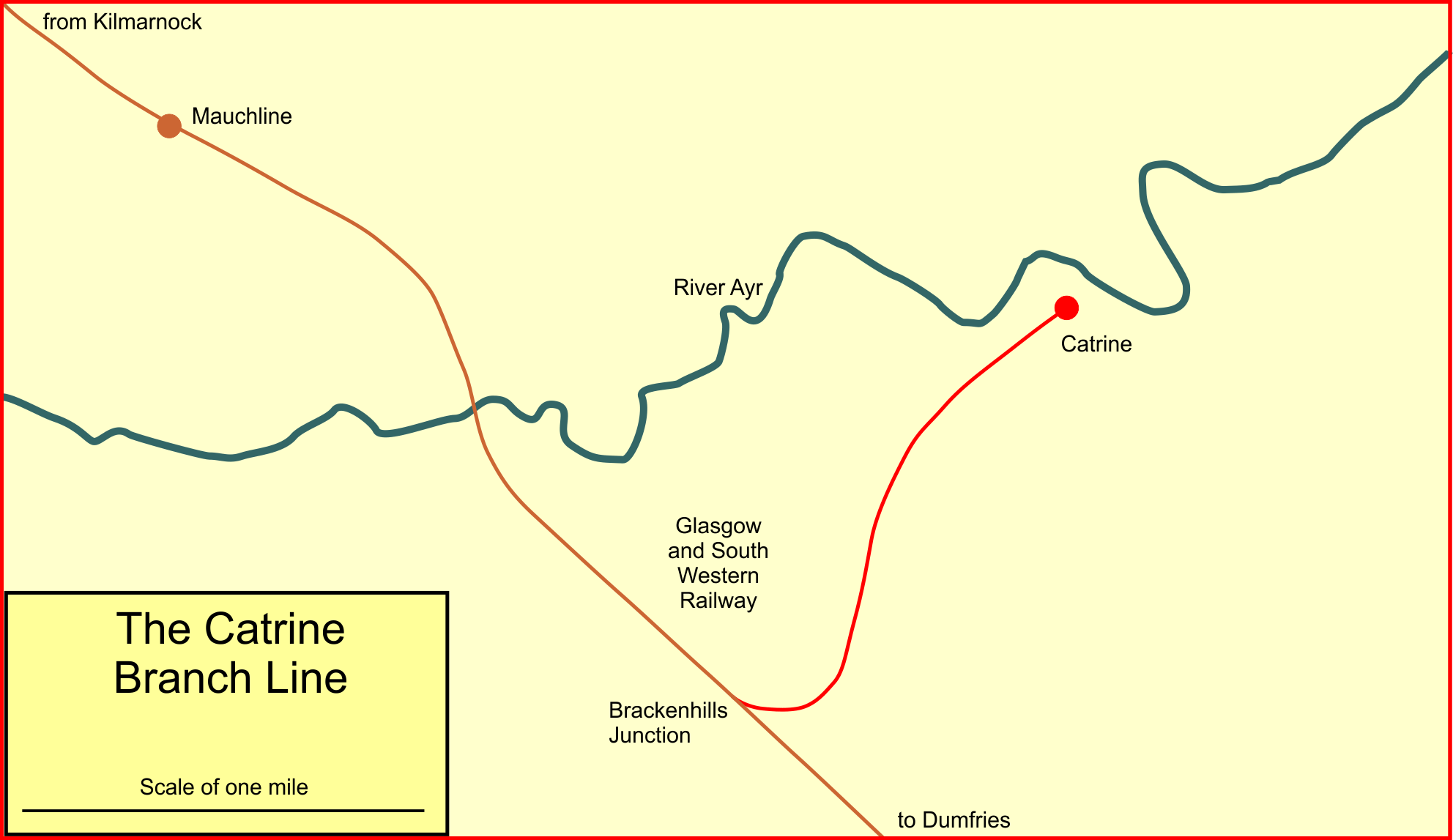
System map of the Catrine branch line

Catrine is located on the River Ayr; the small town had cotton mills that had been founded by the social reformers Claud Alexander and David Dale.

During the construction of the G&SWR main line between Glasgow and Carlisle, that opened in 1850, (Note: The line here was built by the Glasgow, Paisley, Kilmarnock and Ayr Railway but immediately on opening it was vested in the G&SWR.) consideration had been given to building a branch to Catrine, but the idea was not pursued.

Throughout following decades, attempts to raise finance for a line were unsuccessful. In 1894, representatives from the community petitioned the G&SWR to fund a branch line to serve the industry and population of 2,458. Moreover, "Catrine has become a popular Holiday Resort, and would, during the summer months ... have a considerable additional resident population, were Railway facilities afforded."

In 1898, Parliament approved the G&SWR request for 15 new railway routes, but the Catrine Branch was the only one built. The bill received royal assent on 29 August 1898. (Note: From Ross, page 145. It is ambiguous whether he means 1898 or 1899.) The branch line from Brackenhill Junction was opened on 1 September 1903. The under one-and-a-half-mile (2.4 km) single track descended from the junction to the terminus.

=== Operation ===
Passenger service was typically four return journeys Mondays to Fridays, with six on Saturdays. Both initially and later, tank engines hauled the usual one- or two-coach train, but were replaced for a period by an innovative steam railcar. Designed by James Manson, the railcar was better known as a railmotor, a passenger coach incorporating a small integral steam locomotive. The branch operated this type until the suspension of services during the First World War. In David L. Smith's account, drivers unable to handle the most demanding jobs were allocated to the railmotor work:

As a nice, quiet, easy job, they were given the Catrine Caur—the Manson steam railmotor which worked the Mauchline–Catrine service. It broke their hearts. The cab was horribly draughty, and an overspill from the tank filler-hole kept the footplate perpetually wet. Jock Clark gave it up and returned to a humble labouring job at Ayr sheds. Cowan, I believe, caught a chill which was the cause of his death.

But plenty of the younger Ayr drivers—Willie Mackie, Jonnie McGarva, "Brigham" Young, Bob Duncan—did their bit on the Catrine Caur and seemed to knock quite a bit of fun out of the job. Game little thing she was, and a grand steamer. You could kindle her in the morning at Ayr with a barrowful of coal, dump another barrowful on the footplate, and away you went, 6 a.m. "workers" to Annbank, and then on to Mauchline to begin the day's shuttle service to Catrine. On the first run out of Catrine in the morning you would bring a bogie compo. and a milk-van with you—and the grade out of Catrine is 1 in 60 for over a mile. One day Duncan ran her over the 3.4 miles (5.5 km) from Mauchline to Catrine in 5 minutes.

The railmotor is depicted in a photograph in Smith's Tales, before page 25.

=== Royal train ===
David L. Smith recounts a difficulty when the royal train was stabled on the branch:

On 3 June 1942, King George VI and Queen Elizabeth paid a visit to Scotland, travelling during the night. They had a train of 440 tons, and hauled by two Kingmoor compounds, nos. 1141 and 1145. They passed New Cumnock around 3 a.m., and some genius arranged to put them down the Catrine branch for the remainder of the night. A Caley class 3F 0-6-0 was put at the rear end to supply steam heat. At a suitable hour of morning they set off again. Now the Catrine branch consisted of 1¼ miles of 1 in 60 right up to the junction, with a final sharp curve. The rail was probably wet, the compounds slipped furiously, and they came to a dead stand three times. Finally, they had to get the steam heat engine up to push in the rear. They got to Kilmarnock, and there discovered that in the struggles no. 1141 had broken a spring hanger.

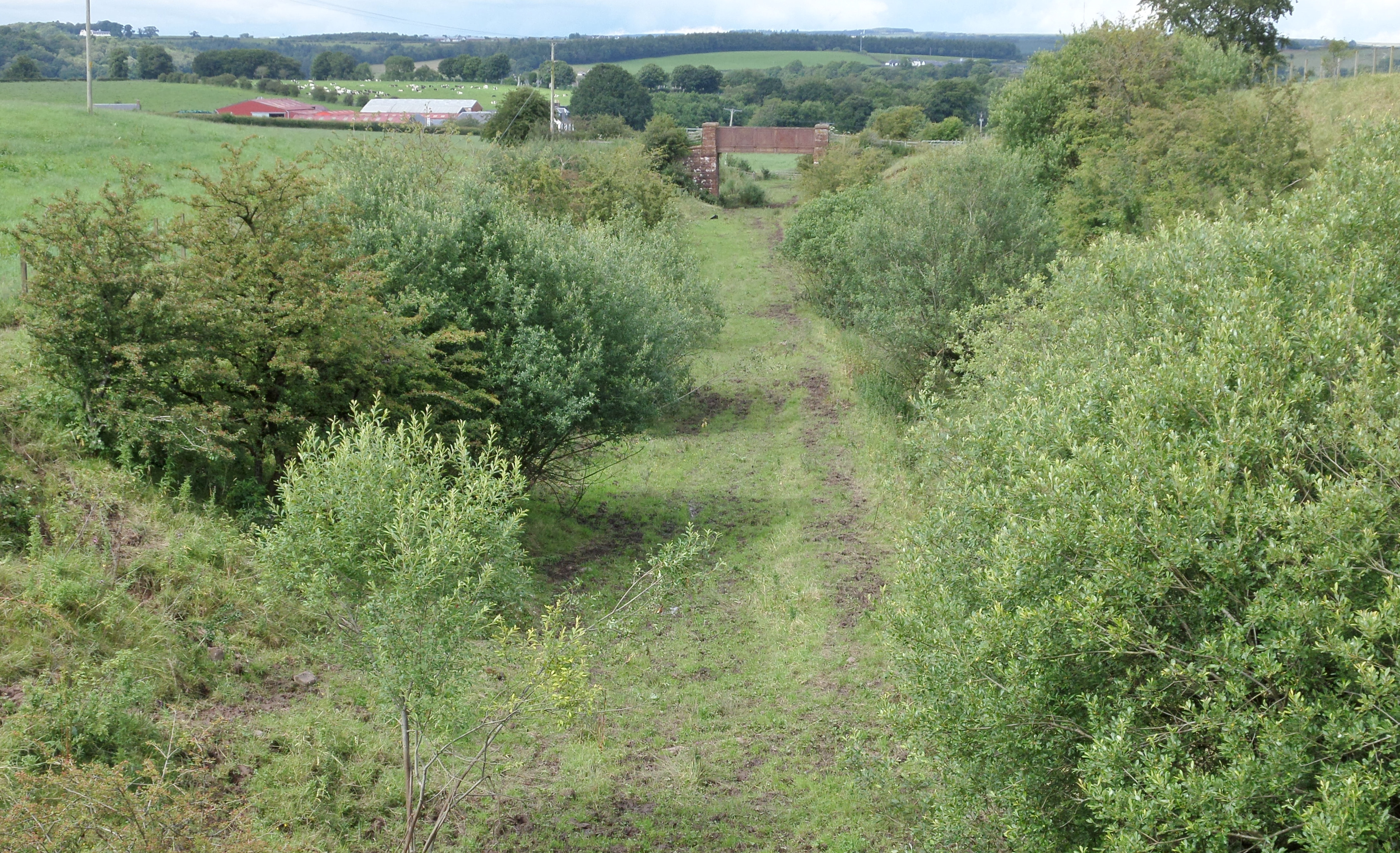
Trackbed near Catrine House, 2017.

=== Closure ===
The branch closed to passengers as a wartime economy measure on 1 January 1917, but reopened in January or February 1919. By the time of closing to passengers permanently on 3 May 1943, the route had become Catrine–Ayr. However, occasional passenger specials continued to use the line. A daily goods train from Ayr served the yard until goods traffic was discontinued from July 1964. The track was lifted within a year, and the Brackenhill Junction signal box closed.

The A76 bridge over the railway cutting is one of the few surviving remnants. The Catrine goods yard is now a small industrial estate.

== Sources ==
- Butt, R. V. J. (October 1995). The Directory of Railway Stations: details every public and private passenger station, halt, platform and stopping place, past and present (1st ed.). Sparkford: Patrick Stephens Ltd. ISBN 978-1-85260-508-7. OCLC 60251199. OL 11956311M.

Preceding station	Disused railways	Following station
Terminus	Glasgow and South Western Railway; Catrine Branch	Mauchline; Line and station closed
