= Jack Young (Scottish footballer) =

Scottish footballer

Personal information
- Place of birth: Hurlford, Scotland
- Position: Forward

Senior career*
Years	Team	Apps	(Gls)
????–1906	Kilmarnock		
1906–1907	Bristol Rovers	33	(14)
1907–????	Notts County		
- * Club domestic league appearances and goals

John "Jack" Young was a professional footballer who played in the Southern Football League for Bristol Rovers.

He was signed from Kilmarnock in May 1906, where he had become known as a clever and pacey forward, and spent the 1906–07 season with Bristol Rovers before leaving them to join Notts County in 1907.

He was Bristol Rovers' top goalscorer during his only season with them, with fourteen goals.
