= Mauchline =

Town and civil parish in East Ayrshire, Scotland

Coordinates: 55.516°N 4.379°W

Mauchline: Scottish Gaelic: Maghlinn
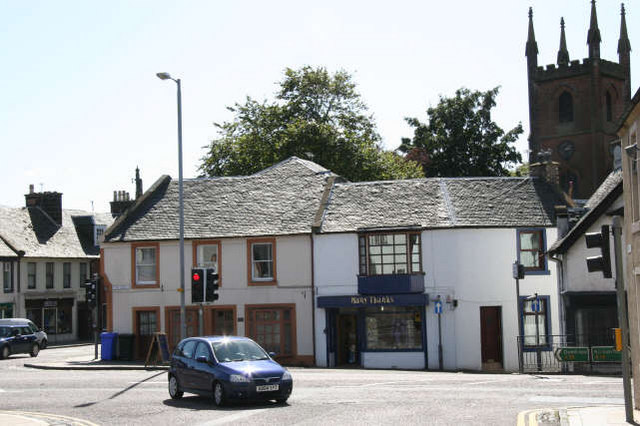
- Mauchline Cross Junction of the B743 from Ayr to the village of Sorn, with the A76(T) road from Kilmarnock to Dumfries.

- Location within East Ayrshire
- Population: 3,900 (2020)
- OS grid reference: NS498272
  - Edinburgh: 70 mi (110 km) SW
  - London: 380 mi (610 km) SSE
- Council area: East Ayrshire
- Lieutenancy area: Ayrshire and Arran
- Country: Scotland
- Sovereign state: United Kingdom
- Post town: MAUCHLINE
- Postcode district: KA5
- Dialling code: 01290
- Police: Scotland
- Fire: Scottish
- Ambulance: Scottish
- UK Parliament: Kilmarnock and Loudoun
- Scottish Parliament: Carrick, Cumnock and Doon Valley
- Website: Village website

Mauchline (/ˈmɒxlɪn/; Scottish Gaelic: Maghlinn) is a town and civil parish in East Ayrshire, Scotland. In the 2001 census Mauchline had a recorded population of 4,105. It is home to the National Burns Memorial.

== Location ==
The town lies by the Glasgow and South Western Railway line, 8 miles (13 kilometres) east-southeast of Kilmarnock and 11 miles (18 km) northeast of Ayr. It is situated on a gentle slope about one mile (1.5 kilometres) from the River Ayr, which flows through the south of the parish of Mauchline.

In former days Loch Brown was about 1 mi (1.6 km) west of the town, but was drained when the railway line from Kilmarnock was built. Bruntwood Loch, near the old laird's house of that name, was once an important site for waterfowl, but drained for agriculture in the eighteenth century.

== History ==
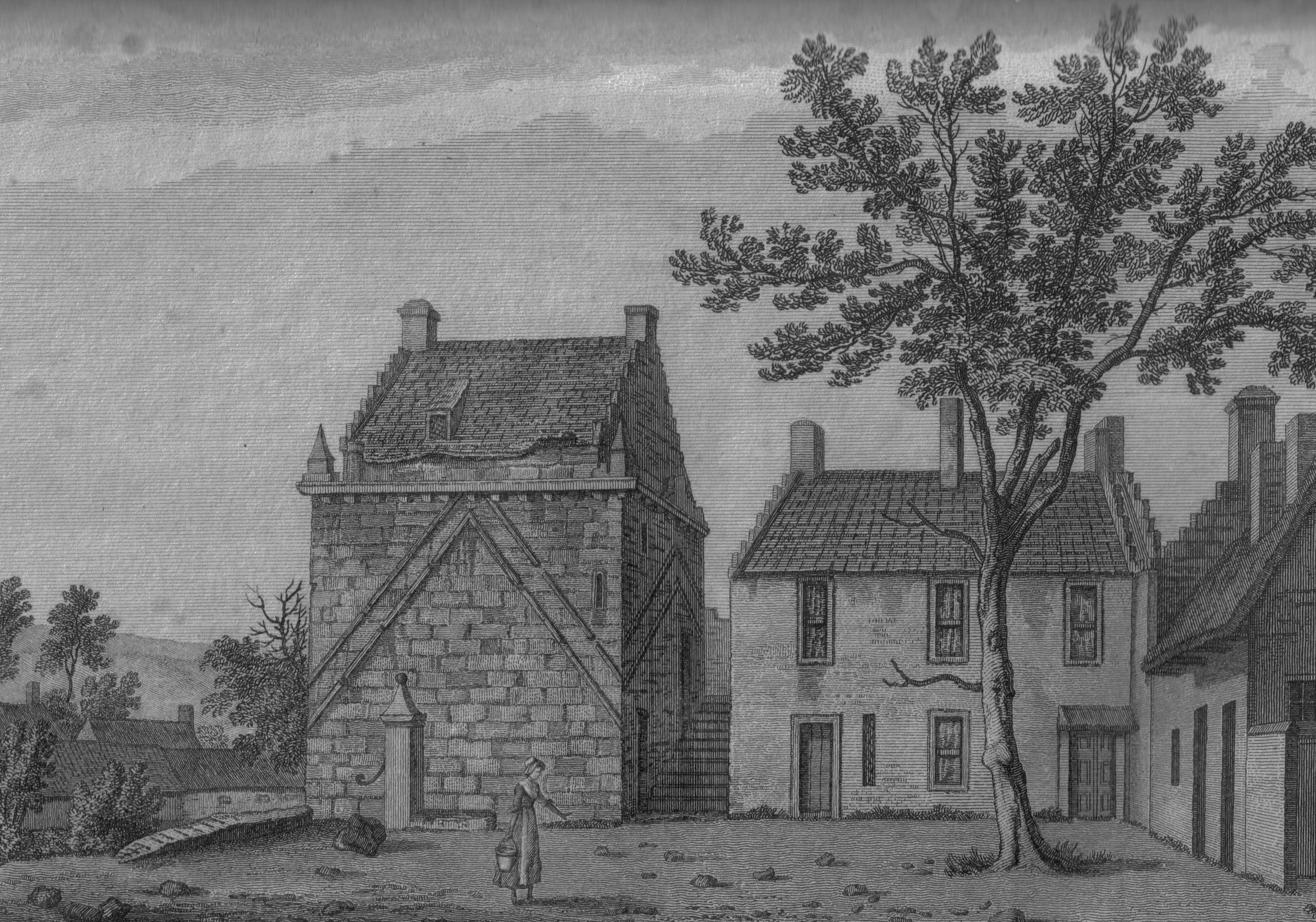
Mauchline Castle in 1790

In 1165, Walter fitz Alan, Steward of Scotland, granted a charter giving land to the Cistercian monks of Melrose. In those days the parish extended to the border with Lanarkshire at Glenbuck. The monks built an abbey, the ruins of which still exist and are known as Hunters Tower or, more recently, as Mauchline Castle. Mauchline was created a burgh of barony by James IV in 1510 and was granted a further charter in 1610; both these charters however have been lost, believed to have perished in a fire at Register House, Edinburgh, in the 17th century. A ley tunnel is said to run from the castle of Mauchline to that of Kingencleugh.

Mauchline featured in the Scottish Reformation. After the reformation the lands of Mauchline passed into the hands of the Earl of Loudoun, and no further historical events are recorded in the parish.

The Holy Fair has been revived as an annual event in Mauchline. Formerly horse races were held on the road from the National Burns Memorial past Mossgiel as part of the annual Mauchline Fair.

=== Scottish Reformation ===
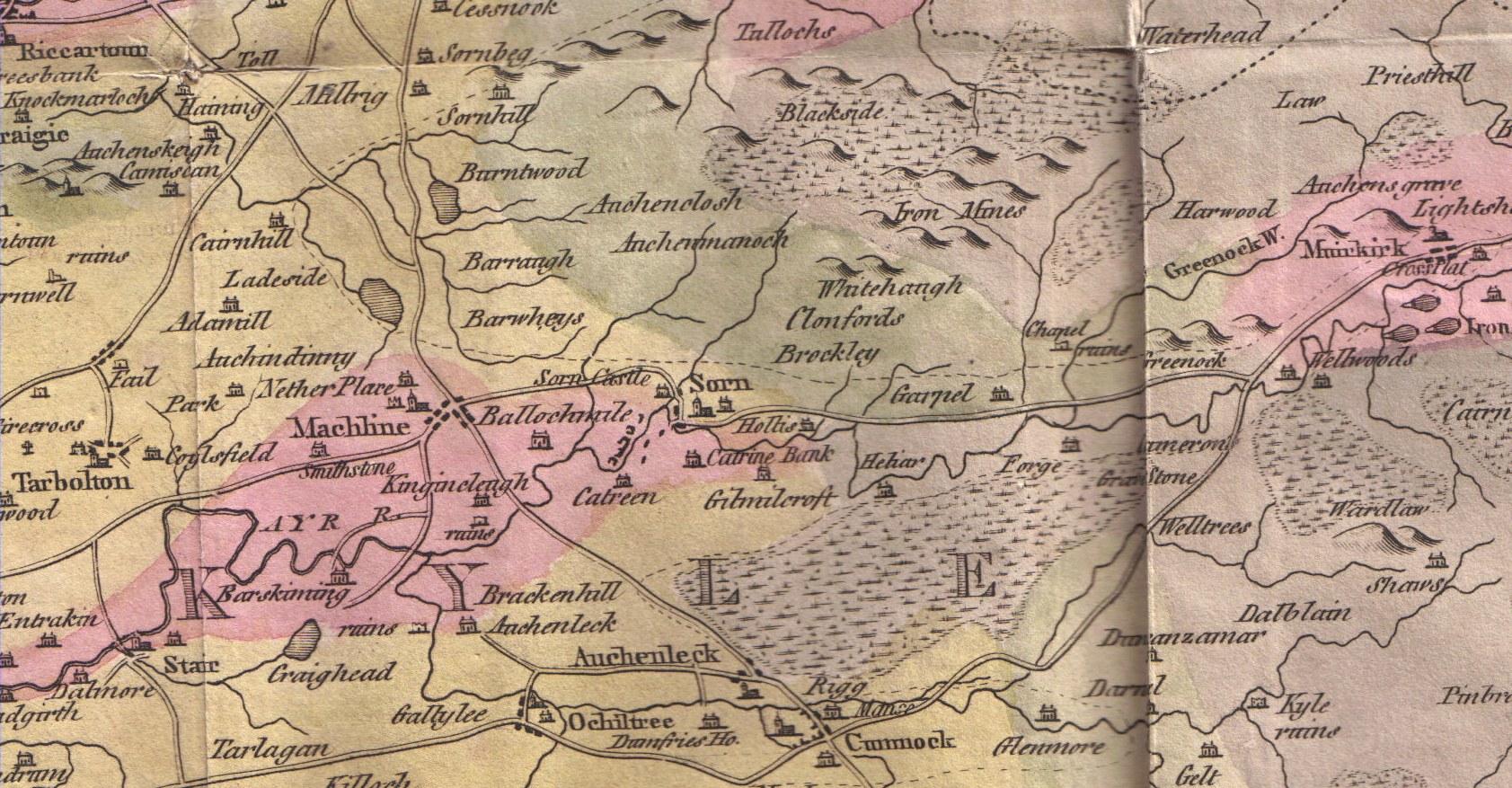
William Aiton's map of Mauchline and surrounding areas, circa 1811.

In 1544 George Wishart, an influential Protestant preacher, visited Mauchline to find the doors of St Michael's church barred against him. His reaction to this was to retreat to Mauchline Moor and to preach for over three hours to a large congregation, under the watchful eye of the Sheriff of Ayr and an armed force. John Knox also preached in Mauchline in 1599 after his return from exile in France and Switzerland. When the Scottish Parliament adopted the Scots Confession of 1560, the reformation was immediately accepted in Mauchline.

Later, Mauchline became something of a stronghold for the Covenanter movement. Mauchline Parish's minister at the time, Reverend George Young, signed the Covenant in Greyfriars Church in Edinburgh in 1633 and subscribed to the Solemn League and Covenant in 1643, and several battles and skirmishes took place in the area during the Wars of the Three Kingdoms. In 1684 the Covenanter James Smith was wounded during a skirmish at Burn of Ann in Kyle. He was taken to Mauchline where he died in prison. In 1685 five men from the town were dragged out of their homes and executed at the loan. A monument was placed over their grave (this was removed in 1861 and replaced by a plinth, with the original monument being built into the wall of the school shed where it stands to this day). The Battle of Mauchline Muir took place in 1648 between Covenanters and Royalist troops. A Covenanters' flag from this battle still hangs in the church. The flag was also carried at the battles of Drumclog and Bothwell Brig.

=== Trade ===
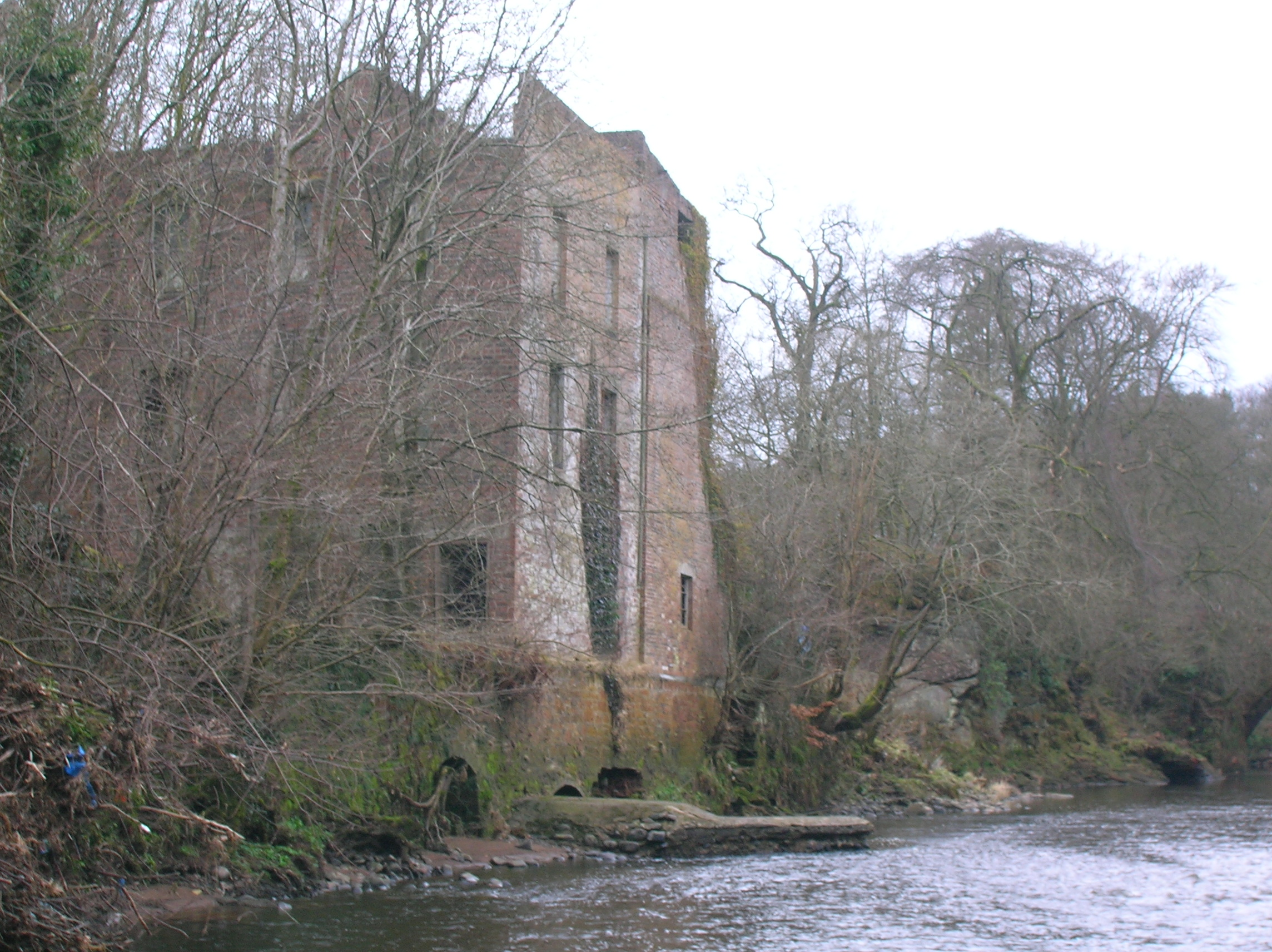
Barskimming Mill ruins, River Ayr.

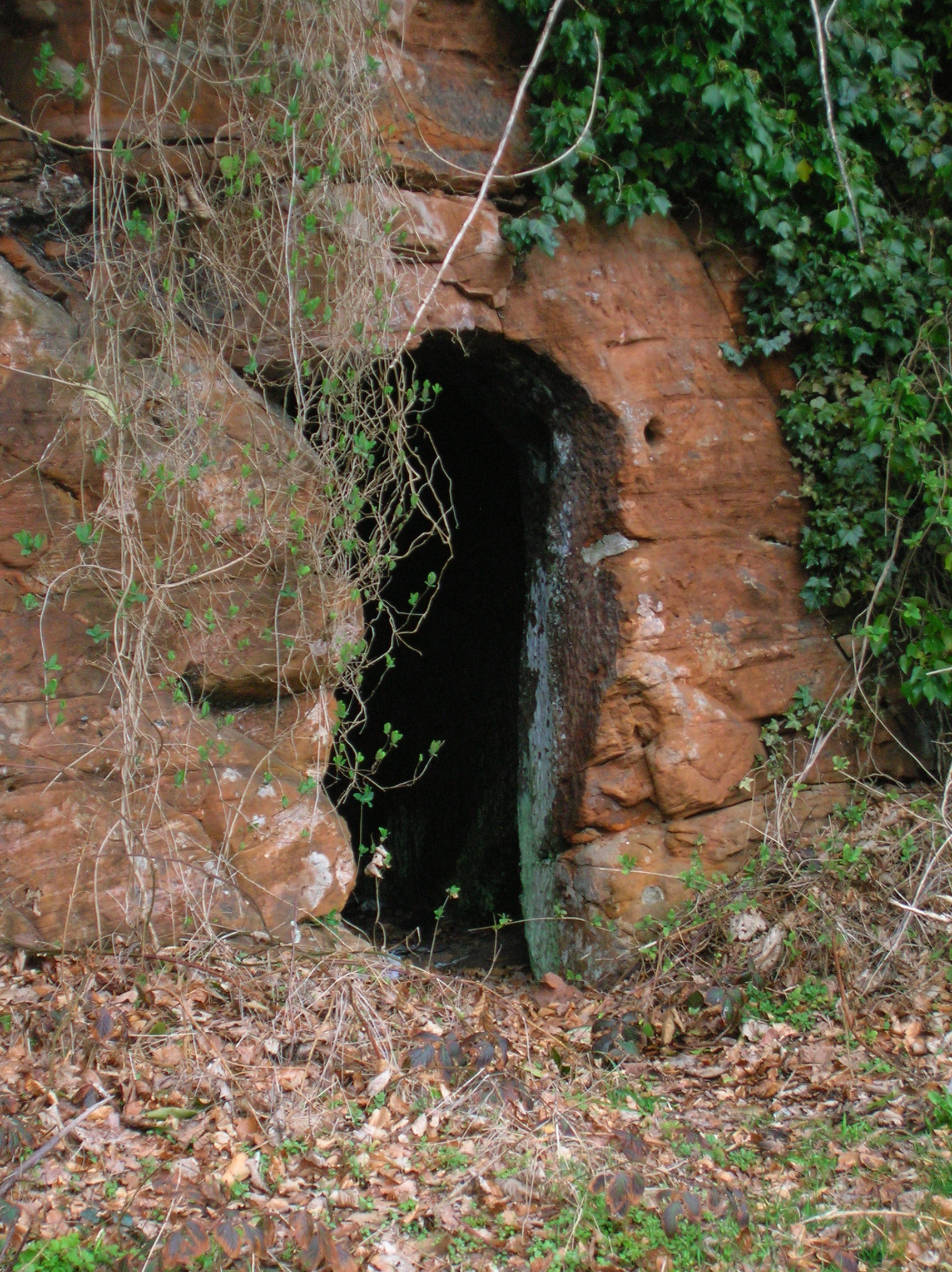
Sandstone Cave near Barskimming Old Bridge and the site of Kemp's House.

The village has at some point been a centre for quarrying sandstone, clock making, box-work, and the production of curling stones.

The sandstone quarry dates back to the 18th century. The peak of production and demand was at the turn of the 19th century when over 200 men were employed at the quarry. A railway siding was installed and as many as 60 wagons a day were transported from Mauchline. Many old buildings throughout the West of Scotland are built with Mauchline sandstone, and stone was being sent as far away as America. After 1918 the use of sandstone declined (houses were built with bricks instead) and this coupled with increased costs meant that eventually, in the 1950s, the last quarry closed.

In the 18th century, Mauchline was renowned for clock making – John "Clockie" Brown is buried in the Kirkyard. The industry declined in the 19th century.

==== Mauchline ware ====
The production of Scottish white-wood products, or Mauchline ware, was carried out from the 1820s until 1939 by the firm of W & A Smith, among other less long-lived manufacturers. The wood used was sycamore. These boxes were extremely collectable. They ranged from the basic transfer as on small vases, each piece having the view of the place of purchase. The transfer subjects ranged across Scotland and more of the British Isles to the rest of the world. Tartan ware was also extremely popular as a result of the Smiths inventing a machine for "weaving" tartan designs on paper. Fernware was introduced in the 1870s. This involved applying actual ferns to the wood which was then stippled in dark brown, the ferns removed and the wood varnished. These products were sent all over the world. A fire in 1933 stopped production, which was never restarted, and W & A Smith finally closed down in 1939.

==== Curling stones ====
The making of curling stones began in the 19th century and for many years experienced full production, however for various reasons, the industry began to decline. Forty people were employed in the 1960s compared to a dozen now. However, the Kays of Scotland curling stone factory is now the only one of its kind in the world, leading to an upsurge in trade.

== Robert Burns ==
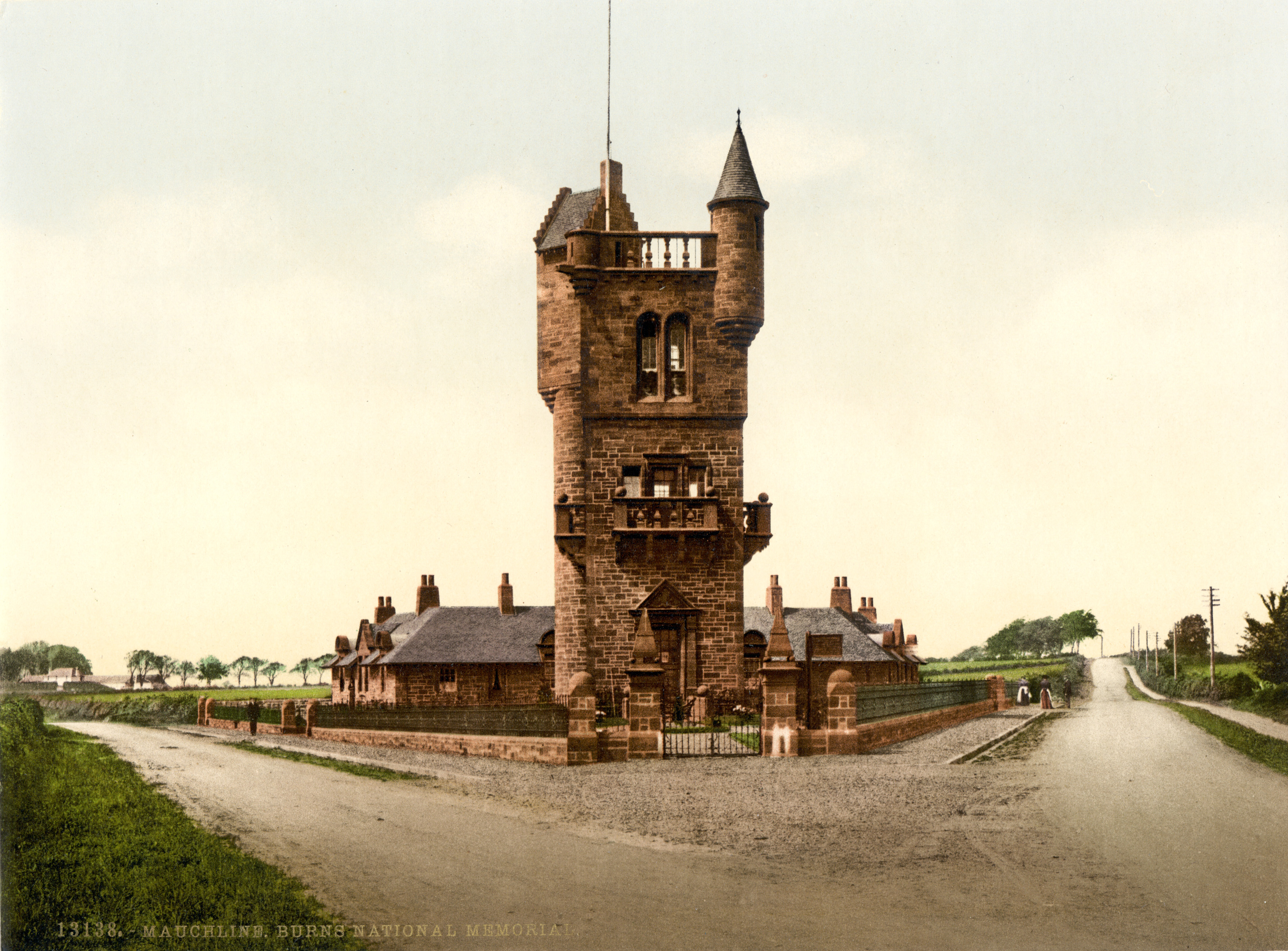
The Robert Burns National Monument in Mauchline, designed by William Fraser

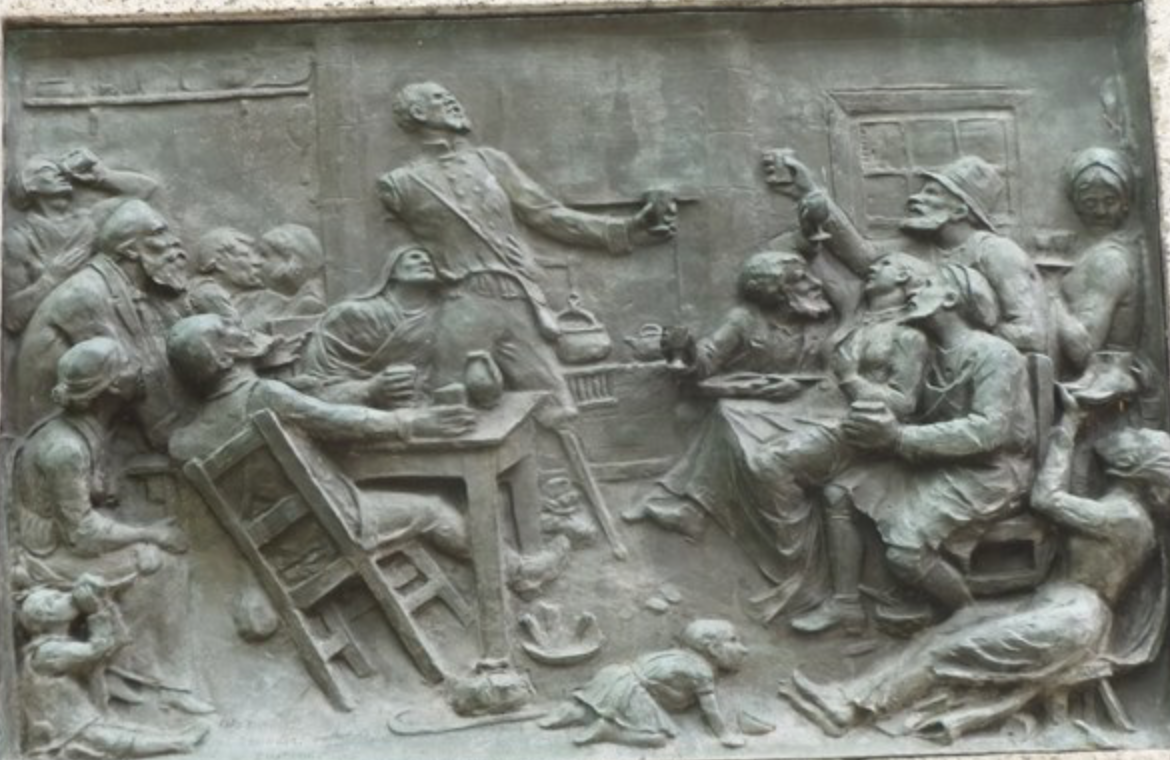
Poosie Nansie’s tavern in Mauchline, scene from Robert Burns’ poem The Jolly Beggars, sculpture by George Anderson Lawson (Victoria Park, Halifax, Nova Scotia)

Robert Burns, Scotland's National Poet, came to live on the outskirts of the village at Mossgiel Farm in 1784. Many of his poems are believed to have been written whilst he was there, notably The Holy Fair, To a Mouse, and Holy Willie's Prayer. Many of his poems were directed towards the perceived hypocrisy of 'the Kirk' (the Church of Scotland). The Kirk was particularly fanatical in Mauchline, which conflicted with the liberal attitude of Burns and his friends. The minister in Burns' time was the Rev William Auld of Old Helenton, near Symington in what is now South Ayrshire.

Burns made many friends (his wife Jean Armour was born in Mauchline) and a lot of enemies whilst in Mauchline, many of whom are buried in the kirkyard: "Holy Wullie" Willie Fisher, the Reverend William "Daddy" Auld, John Richmond, James Armour, "Clockie" Brown and notably Gavin Hamilton, his best friend. The plaque which marks Hamilton's grave was only placed there in 1919 by the Partick Burns Club. Gavin Hamilton had stated that he wanted no headstone, probably due to his run-ins with the Kirk in Mauchline. On one occasion, Burns encountered Wilhelmina Alexander whilst walking through the grounds of Ballochmyle and this led to his famous song 'The Bonnie Lass of Ballochmyle.'

Robert gave shelter to Adam Armour, his wife's brother, following an incident in which Agnes Wilson, a maid at Poosie Nancie's, was driven out of the village by Adam, aged 15, and a group of 'Auld Licht' friends. Burns wrote Adam Armour's Prayer that describes the incident.

William Campbell of Netherplace came to the poet's attention due to his wife Lilias Nelson, a domineering individual of whom Robert wrote Epitaph on a Henpecked Squire;

"As father Adam first was fool'd,
A case that's still too common,
Here lies a man a woman rules,
The devil ruled the woman."

== The Wondrous Mauchline Quern ==
In the 9th century the Welsh monk Nennius wrote a history of Britain, the Historia Brittonum, in which he lists the thirteen wonders of Britain and included in it is the wondrous 'Mauchline Quern' that ground constantly, except on Sundays. It could be heard working underground and the local place name "Auchenbrain" may celebrate it, translating from the Gaelic as "field of the quern".

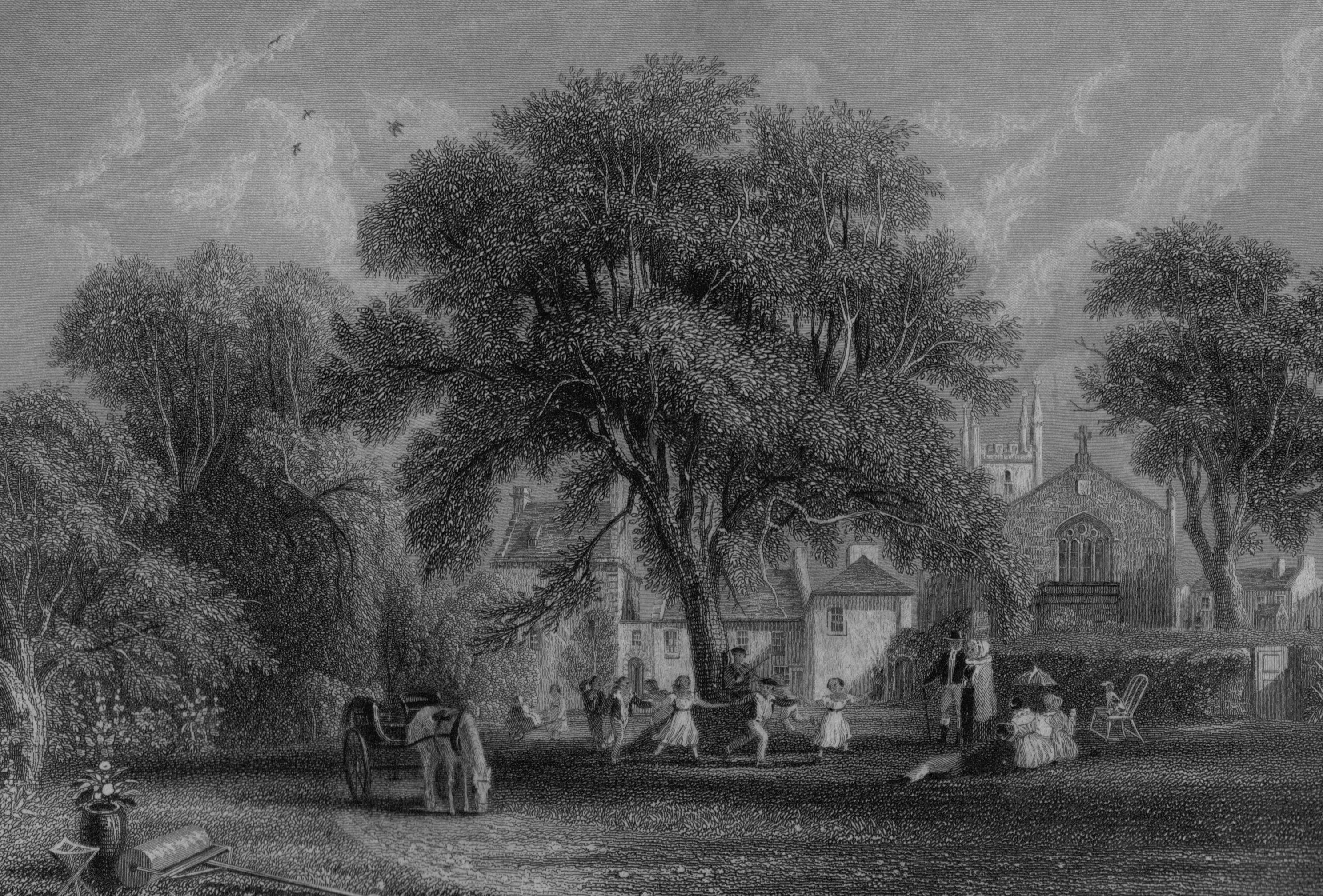
A view of Mauchline and the house of Gavin Hamilton in 1840.

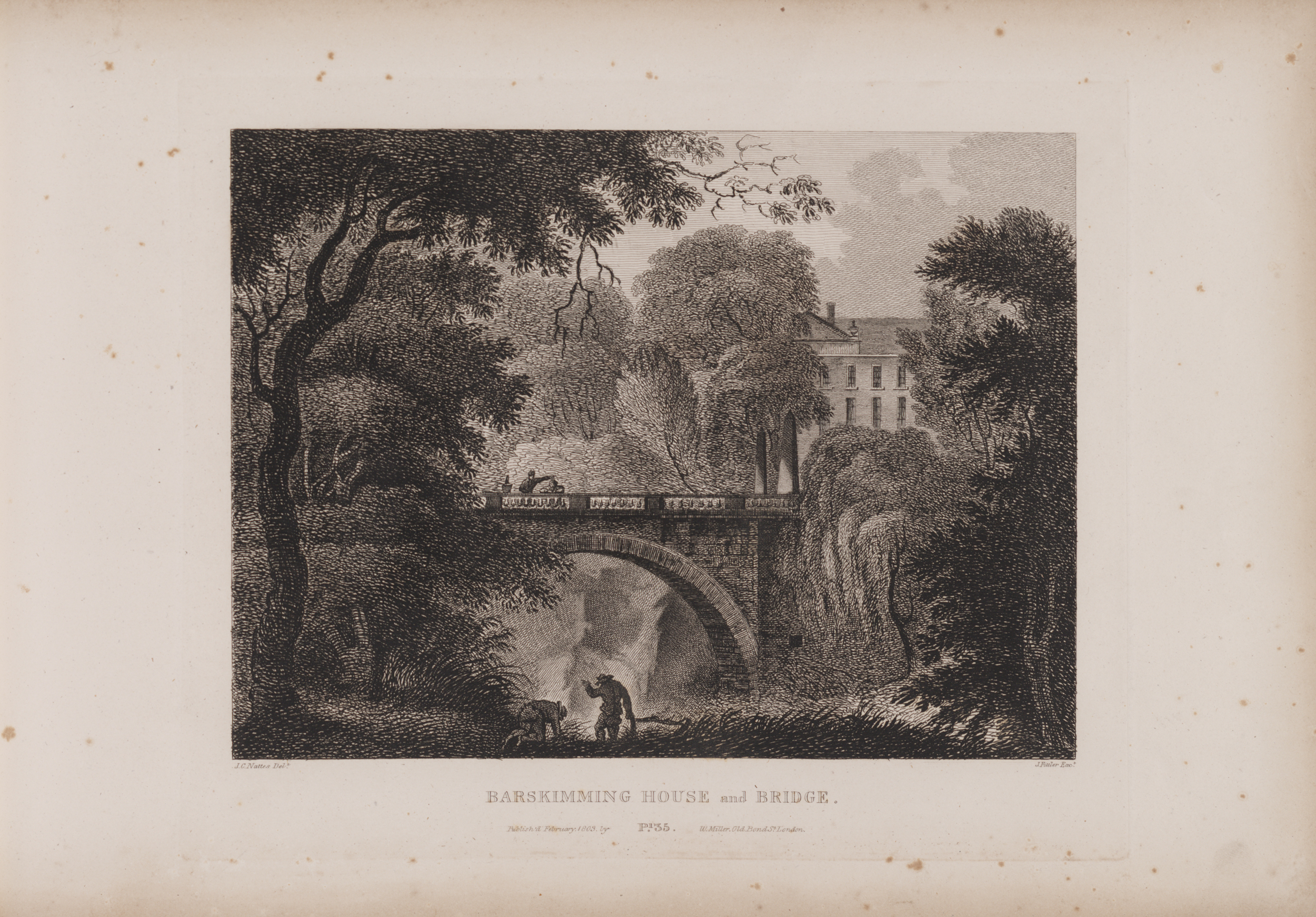
Sketch of Barskimming House and Bridge by John Claude Nattes, c. 1804.

== Kirkyard ==
As well as containing the remains of many of Burns' contemporaries, including the man generally assumed to be the model for 'Holy Willie', Mauchline Kirkyard is the resting place of Mary Cameron, the wife of the last leader of the Chartist movement George Julian Harney. A rare example of a morthouse is located at the western side of the cemetery.

== Transport ==
Mauchline railway station was closed in 1965, however the Glasgow South Western Line is still open. The nearest open station is Auchinleck. Ballochmyle Viaduct over the River Ayr south of Mauchline is the highest extant railway viaduct in Britain.

== Notable people ==
- Jean Armour (1765 - 1834), wife of Robert Burns
- James Fairlie Gemmill (1867–1926), botanist and author of Natural History in the Poetry of Robert Burns
- William Clark (1878 - 1949) the first black professional football player in Scotland and first black player to score in the top flight of English football
- John Smith (1855 - 1934), physician, prominent Scottish international footballer and a member of the 'unofficial' British Lions rugby union tour to Australia and New Zealand
- Hugh 'Lalty' Wilson (1869 - 1940), Scottish international footballer who played with Sunderland and Third Lanark
- Hugh Wilson (1859 - 1946), Scottish international footballer

== See also ==
- Ballochmyle cup and ring marks
- Garrochburn Goods Depot
- Haugh
- Kate Kemp
- Kingencleugh Castle
- Loch Brown
