= Andrew Ross (footballer, born 1878) =

Scottish footballer

Personal information
- Full name: Andrew Ross
- Date of birth: 17 February 1878
- Place of birth: Hurlford, Scotland
- Position: Winger

Senior career*
Years	Team	Apps	(Gls)
	Barrow	?	(?)
1904–1905	Burnley	24	(2)
- * Club domestic league appearances and goals

Andrew Ross (born 17 February 1878, date of death unknown) was a Scottish professional footballer who played as a winger. He played in the English Football League for Burnley.
