= Ross Tollerton =

Recipient of the Victoria Cross

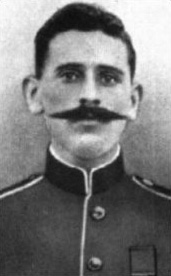
- Born: 6 May 1890; Hurlford, East Ayrshire
- Died: 7 May 1931 (aged 41)
- Burial place: Knadgerhill Cemetery, Irvine
- Military career
- Allegiance: United Kingdom
- Branch: British Army
- Service years: 1905 - 1912, 1914 - 1919
- Rank: Sergeant Major
- Units: The Queen's Own Cameron Highlanders; Royal Scots Fusiliers
- Conflicts: World War I
- Awards: Victoria Cross

Ross Tollerton VC (6 May 1890 – 7 May 1931) born in Hurlford, Ayrshire, was a Scottish recipient of the Victoria Cross, the highest and most prestigious award for gallantry in the face of the enemy that can be awarded to British and Commonwealth forces.

== VC action ==
He was 24 years old, and a private in the 1st Battalion, The Queen's Own Cameron Highlanders, British Army during the First World War when the following deed took place for which he was awarded the VC.

For most conspicuous bravery and devotion to duty on the 14th September, 1914, at the battle of the Aisne. He carried a wounded Officer under heavy fire as far as he was able into a place of greater safety; then, although himself wounded in the head and hand, he struggled back to the firing line, where he remained till his Battalion retired, when he returned to the wounded Officer and lay beside him for three days, until they were both rescued.

== Later life ==
After his career in the army he took up a position as school janitor in Irvine, Ayrshire. He married later in life to Agnus née Muir and due to this they had no children during their marriage, although Agnus had one son, Robert, from a previous relationship.

Tollerton never recovered from his injuries and died at age 41 from stomach cancer in 1931. Lieutenant J. S. M. Matheson sent a wreath. His widow died in 1939 at the age of 78 in which his Victoria Cross was passed over to his brother, Alexander Tollerton. It was Alexander's widow who eventually gave it to the Queen's Own Cameron Highlanders Museum in 1956 on long-term loan and it remains there to this day.

His Victoria Cross is displayed at the Highlander's Museum, Queen's Own Highlanders (Seaforth and Camerons), Fort George, Inverness-shire, Scotland.

His act of bravery is also depicted in a painting by Allen Stewart.

== Freemasonry ==
He was Initiated into Scottish Freemasonry in Lodge Irvine St Andrew, No. 149, (Irvine, Ayrshire, Scotland) on 19 June, Passed on 7 July and Raised on 23 July 1915.
