= Hurlford railway station =

Former railway station in Scotland

Coordinates: 55.5994°N 4.4632°W

Hurlford
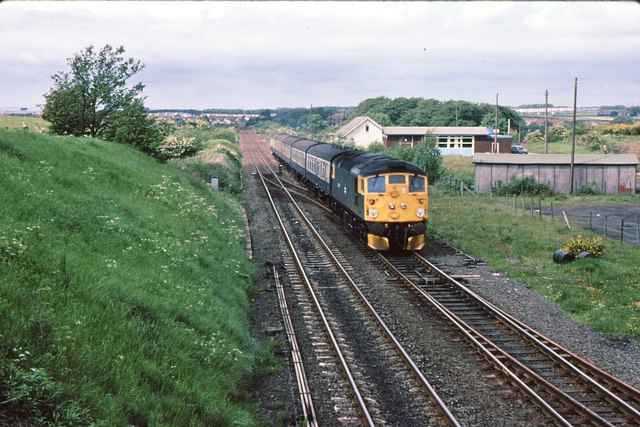
- Nothing remained by 1983 to show where the station had been

General information
- Location: Hurlford, East Ayrshire; Scotland
- Platforms: 2

Other information
- Status: Disused

History
- Original company: Glasgow, Paisley, Kilmarnock and Ayr Railway
- Pre-grouping: Glasgow and South Western Railway
- Post-grouping: London, Midland and Scottish Railway

Key dates
- 9 August 1848: Opened
- 7 March 1955: Closed
Location

Hurlford railway station was a railway station serving the village of Hurlford, East Ayrshire, Scotland. The station was originally part of the Glasgow, Paisley, Kilmarnock and Ayr Railway.

== History ==
The station opened on 9 August 1848 and closed to passengers on 7 March 1955.

The Garrochburn Goods Depot lay a few miles to the south and until circa 1926 a Mossgiel Tunnel Platform was located just to the north of the northern Mossgiel Tunnel portal.

Today the line is still open as part of the Glasgow South Western Line.

Preceding station	Historical railways	Following station
Mauchline; Line open; station closed	Glasgow and South Western Railway; Glasgow, Paisley, Kilmarnock and Ayr Railway	Kilmarnock
Barleith; Line and station closed	Glasgow and South Western Railway; Darvel Branch	Kilmarnock
