= Shawhill Estate =

Coordinates: 55.607°N 4.447°W

- Location within East Ayrshire
- Council area: East Ayrshire
- Lieutenancy area: Ayrshire
- Country: Scotland
- Sovereign state: United Kingdom
- Post town: Kilmarnock
- Postcode district: KA1 5HZ
- Police: Scotland
- Fire: Scottish
- Ambulance: Scottish

Shawhill was an estate within a wide meander of the River Irvine in Hurlford, East Ayrshire, Parish of Riccarton, Scotland. Shawhill House (NS 245954 637634) still stands, however the office buildings are now private dwelling and much of the estate has also been sold.

== History ==
=== The house and estate ===
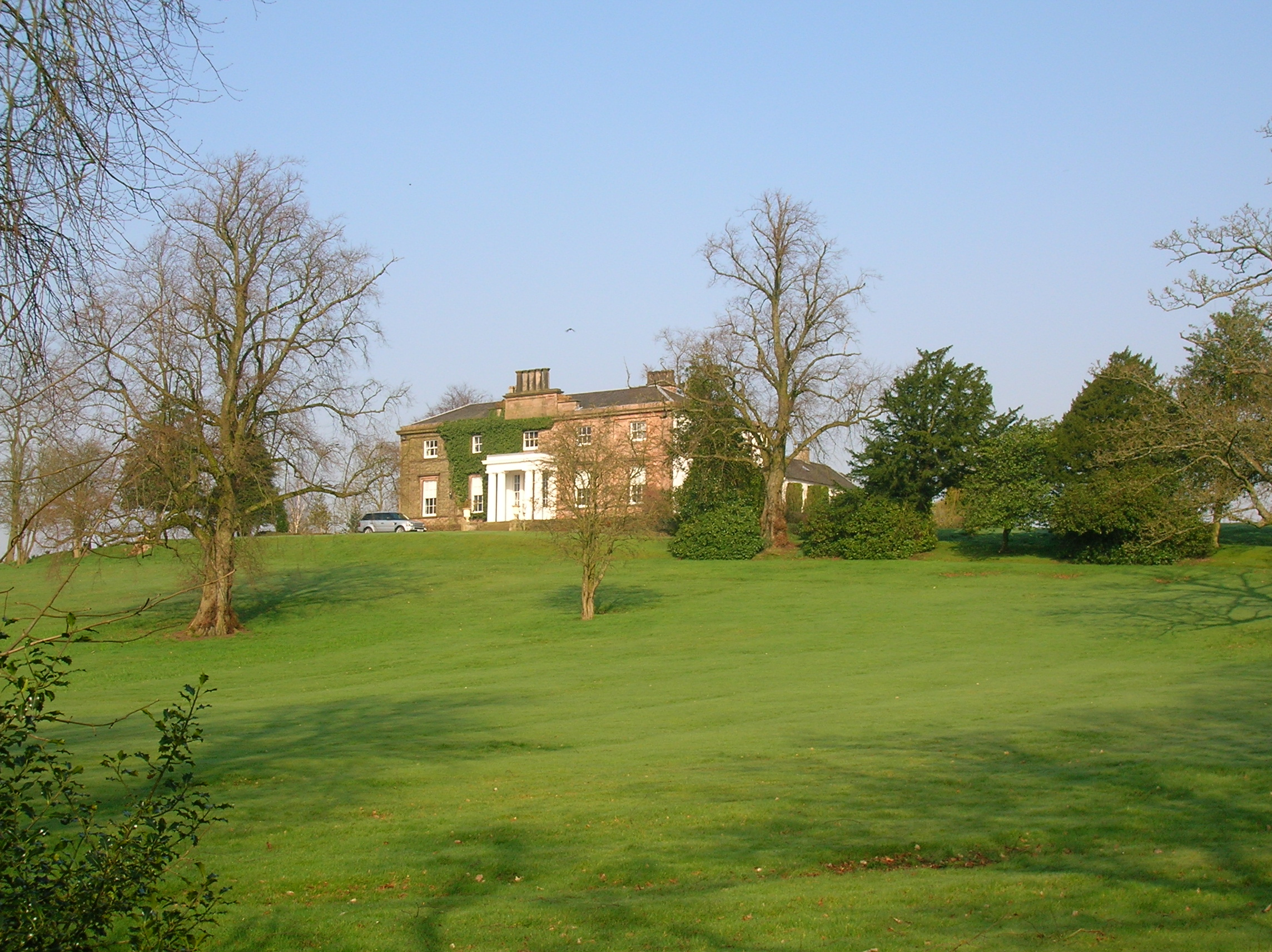
Shawhill House

In the late 18th century the Shawhill Estate was held by William Herbert, the Laird of Shaw, he had two sons, John and George. The American War of Independence resulted in losses so great that he was forced to sell the estate. John Carse, grandfather of the well known Paxton, Cowie, and Stewart families purchased the estate and built a house on an elevated site to the south of the old farmstead, naming it Shawhill. Mr Carse later sold the property to John Carlyle who had made his fortune from plantations in the West Indies. Upon Carlyle's death in 1822 Shawhill was greatly enlarged and improved by Colonel Clark. In the 1870s John Stewart of the firm of Stewart Brothers, Clothiers, Kilmarnock and London, owned the estate.

The Category B Listed house that exists today dates from 1820 and has a large Doric porch, five bay windows at the front and five chimney pots on a single pediment above the front door. An older building of white-washed stonework is incorporated at the back. A Gothic summerhouse with a broad-eaved square construction of the same era as the house is present. The house is of two storeys; projecting office wing with bowed end - walled garden at the side.

Shawhill Farm sits close to the banks of the River Irvine and once had stepping stones crossing over towards Templetonburn and the site of the old Holmhead dwelling of Thomas Raeburn, the 'Ayrshire Hermit'.

McMichael records Shawhill as being one of "the chief seats in the parish", lying in a portion of the parish, south of Galston.

=== A drowning ===
Etymology
The meaning of Shaw is a place with a small natural wood, thicket, or coppice

Mr. Roxborough, a weaver of Galston, after a drinking bout lasting several days, called for his suit one night, saying that the gentleman in black wanted him. Leaving the house with the imaginary man he was found later found drowned at the large whinstone rock near the southern termination of the Shawhill woods by some of Mr Carse's sons. Margaret Irvine of the nearby old Shaw Farm had something of a reputation as a witch and it was thought appropriate that a man drowned by the Devil should be recovered by one of his adherents. Placed on a cart, the body was taken to Galston, accompanied en route by an unknown man dressed in black.

The location of the Shawhill Estate, East Ayrshire

== Micro-history ==
Shawhill House frontage

Thomas Raeburn, a well known eccentric and gardener for John Carlyle, used to cross the River Irvine from his property at Holmhead on stilts.

Mr Carse and a group of farmers built the schoolhouse on the Riccarton Road and appointed a teacher.

Mr Carse protected a fine old thorn tree that grew at the Hurlford Bridge end by having a pair of jugs attached to it, made by David Brown the local blacksmith. These were never used; however' they acted as a deterrent to local children who might harm it.

It is recorded that at the Shawhill Estate was located the best chestnut tree in the village and when the village boys ventured to harvest the chestnuts, old Neil O' Shawhill would fire his 12 bore high up in the tree to scare them.

== See also ==
- Crookedholm
- John Howie (businessman)
