= Colin Douglas (footballer) =

Scottish footballer

Personal information
- Full name: Colin Francis Douglas
- Date of birth: 9 September 1962 (age 64)
- Place of birth: Hurlford, Scotland
- Height: 6 ft 1 in (1.85 m)
- Positions: Right-back; centre-forward

Youth career
- –1977: Kilmarnock Colts
- 1977–????: Ayr United
- ????–1980: Bellfield BC

Senior career*
Years	Team	Apps	(Gls)
1980–1981	Celtic	0	(0)
1981–1986	Doncaster Rovers	222	(48)
1986–1988	Rotherham United	83	(4)
1988–1993	Doncaster Rovers	192	(5)
1993–1994	Bridlington Town		
1994–2000	Armthorpe Welfare		
2000–2002	Hatfield Main		
2002–	Armthorpe Welfare		

Managerial career
- –2000: Armthorpe Welfare
- 2000–2002: Hatfield Main
- * Club domestic league appearances and goals

Colin Francis Douglas (born 9 September 1962) is a Scottish former footballer who played as a centre forward and right back for Doncaster Rovers and Rotherham United. He is second in the list of players who have made the appearances in all competitions for Doncaster behind James Coppinger.

== Playing career ==
=== Youth ===
Douglas attended St Joseph's Academy in Kilmarnock. He began as wing half playing for Kilmarnock Colts, then in February 1977 moving to Ayr United. He was at Bellfield Boys Club before moving to Celtic in 1980.

=== Celtic ===
His first senior club was Celtic, then managed by Billy McNeil. He only played one game for them on 6 October 1980 in the semi-final of the Glasgow Cup against Queen's Park where he scored his first senior goal in the 76th minute in a 2–0 victory.

=== Doncaster Rovers (1st period) ===
In summer 1981 he was signed by manager Billy Bremner of Doncaster, coming on as substitute to play his first match on 5 September in a 2–2 draw against Bristol City at Ashton Gate in Division 3. He scored his first goal 10 days later in a 1–1 draw at Chesterfield in the League Cup. As a 20-year-old, he went on to score 5 goals in 49 appearances that first season. In 1985, he was a member of the Rovers side that beat then high flying QPR in the third round of the FA Cup. His time at the club ended after an incident on the team coach with manager Dave Cusack.

=== Rotherham United ===
Initially on loan, Douglas started up front for the Millers, then moved to playing full back following an injury.

=== Doncaster Rovers (2nd period) ===
He was brought back to Doncaster in 1988 by manager Dave Mackay. "Duggie" was famed for his "never say die" attitude, and was named player of the year for the 3rd time in 1991. He ended his career at Doncaster with a record of 468 appearances (444 starts) in all competitions.

=== Later career ===
He moved to Bridlington Town who played their Northern Premier League Premier Division home games that season at Doncaster Rovers Belle Vue ground, and then on to be player manager of Armthorpe Welfare and Hatfield Main before returning to Armthorpe as a player in July 2002.
