= John Claude Nattes =

English painter

John Claude Nattes (c.1765, London–1839, Dover) was a watercolourist and topographical draughtsman of either French or English origin.

In 1789, Sir Joseph Banks commissioned him to record the buildings of Lincolnshire and this resulted in more than 700 drawings and watercolours, made between 1789 and 1797, which are now preserved in Lincoln Central Library. This body of work provides researchers with a great deal of material with which to study pre-Victorian topography. Nattes accompanied John Stoddart on his tours of Scotland in 1799 and 1800 and contributed illustrations to his Remarks on Local Scenery and Manners in Scotland (1801).

Nattes produced some of the earliest examples of watercolour painting in Britain. He was associated with the founding of the Society of Painters in Watercolours, founded in 1804, but he was expelled two years later for exhibiting other people's work as his own. He continued to exhibit at the Royal Academy until 1814.

According to the Dictionary of National Biography, Nattes died in London in 1822. However, parish register evidence suggests a later date; he was apparently a witness at the wedding of Robert Holdsworth Carew Hunt and Bridget Margaret Barber on 16 June 1836 at Holy Trinity Church, Clapham. and the burial register of St. Mary’s church,Dover, lists his interment on 14 Sep 1839 at the age of 75.

John Claude Nattes married Sarah Barber, daughter of William and Jane Barber. Their son Charles Claude Nattes, born 13 January 1794, was christened in St Andrew, Holborn. He died 21 January 1818 in Penang as a lieutenant in the service of the Madras Engineers. Sarah died in late 1845.
