= Netherplace =

Coordinates: 55.772315°N 4.360930°W

- Location within Scotland Netherplace (Scotland)
- Lieutenancy area: Renfrewshire
- Country: Scotland
- Sovereign state: United Kingdom
- Post town: GLASGOW
- Postcode district: G77
- Dialling code: 0141
- Police: Scotland
- Fire: Scottish
- Ambulance: Scottish
- UK Parliament: East Renfrewshire
- Scottish Parliament: Eastwood

Netherplace is a hamlet in East Renfrewshire. It is to the west of Newton Mearns, and adjacent to the M77 motorway. The settlement is almost entirely along the Netherplace Road. It contains a farm, as well as some houses, and a reservoir. It also used to be home to the Netherplace Dye Works, which was demolished in 2016, after a fly infestation across Newton Mearns which also spread to nearby Giffnock and Clarkston.
