= Hurlford =

Coordinates: 55.59846°N 4.45205°W

- Village
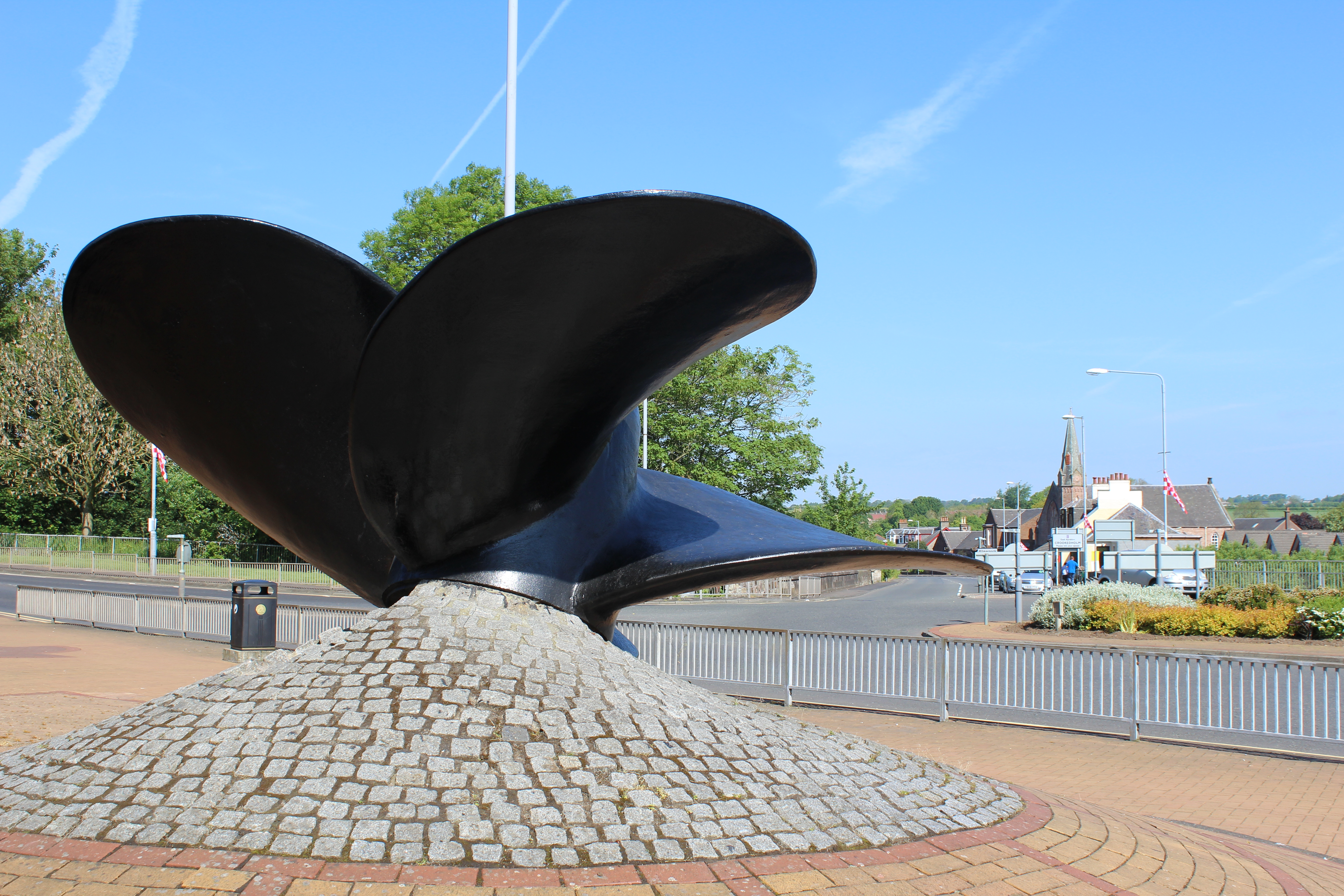
- Hurlford Cross. The propeller was placed on site by Hurlford & Crookedholm Community Council in September 1984 to commemorate aspects of working life of communities between mid 19th–20th centuries.

- Location within East Ayrshire
- Population: 4,400 (2020)
- OS grid reference: NS456366
  - Edinburgh: 75 mi (121 km)
  - London: 404 mi (650 km)
- Council area: East Ayrshire
- Lieutenancy area: Ayrshire and Arran
- Country: Scotland
- Sovereign state: United Kingdom
- Post town: KILMARNOCK
- Postcode district: KA1, KA3
- Dialling code: 01560; 01563
- Police: Scotland
- Fire: Scottish
- Ambulance: Scottish
- UK Parliament: Kilmarnock and Loudoun
- Scottish Parliament: Kilmarnock and Irvine Valley

Hurlford is a village in East Ayrshire, Scotland, situated on the outskirts of Kilmarnock. It has a population of 4,968. Hurlford's former names include Whirlford and Hurdleford. The village was named Whirlford as a result of a ford crossing the River Irvine east of Hurlford Cross, near Shawhill. The census locality is called Hurlford and Crookedholm.

The village's Blair Park is home to Hurlford United F.C. and many notable footballers have been trained there.

== History ==
Like much of the area of what is now the present day East Ayrshire, Hurlford suffered greatly as a result of the interwar depression which resulted in large unemployment numbers in the area. Hurlford's main economic history centred around ironworks at the Portland Iron Works site, along with additional iron work sites located in Lugar, Muirkirk and Galston which contributed to the wider iron work industry in East Ayrshire.

Between 2019 and 2020, the Ayrshire Roads Alliance, the alliance between East Ayrshire Council and South Ayrshire Council to maintain both of the areas roads and infrastructure network, announced plans for the re–design of the village centre. Proposals were mainly focused on the area surrounding the villages Union Street, Academy Street and Mauchline Road, with the Ayrshire Roads Alliance claiming that improvements were being sought in order to make the area "safer and more pleasant for walking and wheeling, and to enhance the public spaces".

As a result of the COVID-19 pandemic in Scotland, the project had to be halted for a period of time due to government embedded restrictions before resuming once restrictions began to lift. The project steering group consisted of local residents from the village and representatives from Hurlford Primary School. It also features the tenants' forum and community association. Pupils from Hurlford Primary School also assisted in design options for the parklet area as part of the regeneration project.

== Governance ==
The village is mostly contained in the Kilmarnock East and Hurlford ward of East Ayrshire Council while some outlying hamlets are in the Irvine Valley ward.

East Ayrshire, and its associated political body, East Ayrshire Council, was created in 1996 under the Local Government etc. (Scotland) Act 1994, which replaced Scotland's previous local government structure of upper-tier regions and lower-tier districts with unitary council areas providing all local government services. East Ayrshire covered the combined area of the abolished Kilmarnock and Loudoun and Cumnock and Doon Valley districts, and also took over the functions of the abolished Strathclyde Regional Council within the area. The area's name references its location within the historic county of Ayrshire, which had been abolished for local government purposes in 1975 when Kilmarnock and Loudoun, Cumnock and Doon Valley, and Strathclyde region had been created.

=== Councillors ===
Election	Councillors			
2007	John Campbell (SNP)	Jim Buchannan (SNP)	Drew McIntyre (Labour)	Gordon Cree (Labour)
2012	John Campbell (SNP)	Jim Buchannan (SNP)	Drew McIntyre (Labour)	Gordon Cree (Labour)
2017 by-election	John Campbell (SNP)	Fiona Campbell (SNP)	Drew McIntyre (Labour)	Gordon Cree (Labour)
2017	John Campbell (SNP)	Fiona Campbell (SNP)	Barry Douglas (Labour)	Jon Herd (Conservative)
2022	Graham Barton (SNP)	Neal Ingram (SNP)	Barry Douglas (Labour)	Graham Boyd (Ind.)

=== UK Parliament ===
Constituency	Member	Party
Kilmarnock and Loudoun	Lillian Jones	Scottish Labour

=== Scottish Parliament ===
==== Constituency MSPs ====
Constituency	Member	Party
Kilmarnock and Irvine Valley	Willie Coffey	SNP

==== Regional List MSPs ====
Constituency	Member	Party
South Scotland	Emma Harper	Scottish National
South Scotland	Craig Hoy	Conservative
South Scotland	Brian Whittle	Conservative
South Scotland	Sharon Dowey	Conservative
South Scotland	Carol Mochan	Labour
South Scotland	Martin Whitfield	Labour
South Scotland	Colin Smyth	Labour

== Health care and economy ==
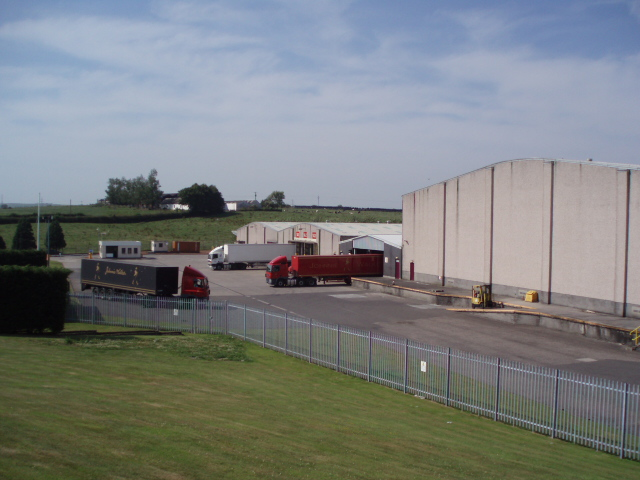
Johnnie Walker trucks loading up at the Barleith distribution centre in the village

The main hospital for the village is University Hospital Crosshouse located between the village of Crosshouse and the administrative town of East Ayrshire, Kilmarnock. Kirklandside Hospital was a hospital within Hurlford and closed between 2018 and 2020. Kirklandside hospital provided consultant-led services for frail elderly patients. It had 25 long-stay beds for inpatient care and a day hospital which provided assessment and rehabilitation facilities.

The village developed rapidly in the 19th century, following the discovery of coal. Fireclay and ironstone were also worked extensively until production ceased in the 1970s. A poignant reminder of the heyday of the iron and steel industry of Hurlford is the ship's propeller erected at the Cross in the lately redeveloped town centre.

Today, industries found in Hurlford include brakepad manufacturing by Eurofriction Limited and whisky maturation by independent whisky group Loch Lomond Group. Barleith distribution centre on the outskirts of Hurlford was previously owned by international drinks company Diageo. The plant closed in 2010, the first phase of Diageo's closure plans in Kilmarnock and surrounding areas, where the Johnnie Walker brand had been established in 1820 and was produced, blended and bottled at the Hill Street plant in Kilmarnock until its closure in 2012.

== Religion ==
Traditionally part of Riccarton parish, the village is now a quoad sacra parish in its own right. Hurlford is home to four church buildings—the Hurlford Kirk and Hurlford Church, both in Main Road, Crookedholm and the Mauchline Road Church.

St Paul's Catholic Church is on Galston Road, Gothic style church, designed by architect Robert Samson Ingram and dates from 1883 and is constructed in yellow brick.

Hurlford Church, the former Free Church built in 1857, is part of the Church of Scotland. Mauchline Road Church was formerly part of the Unitarian Church. It is now used as luxury housing. The Hurlford Kirk, which was the original parish church built in 1875 has also been converted into a house, having become redundant as a church in 1996 when its congregation merged with that of the Free Church.

== Education ==
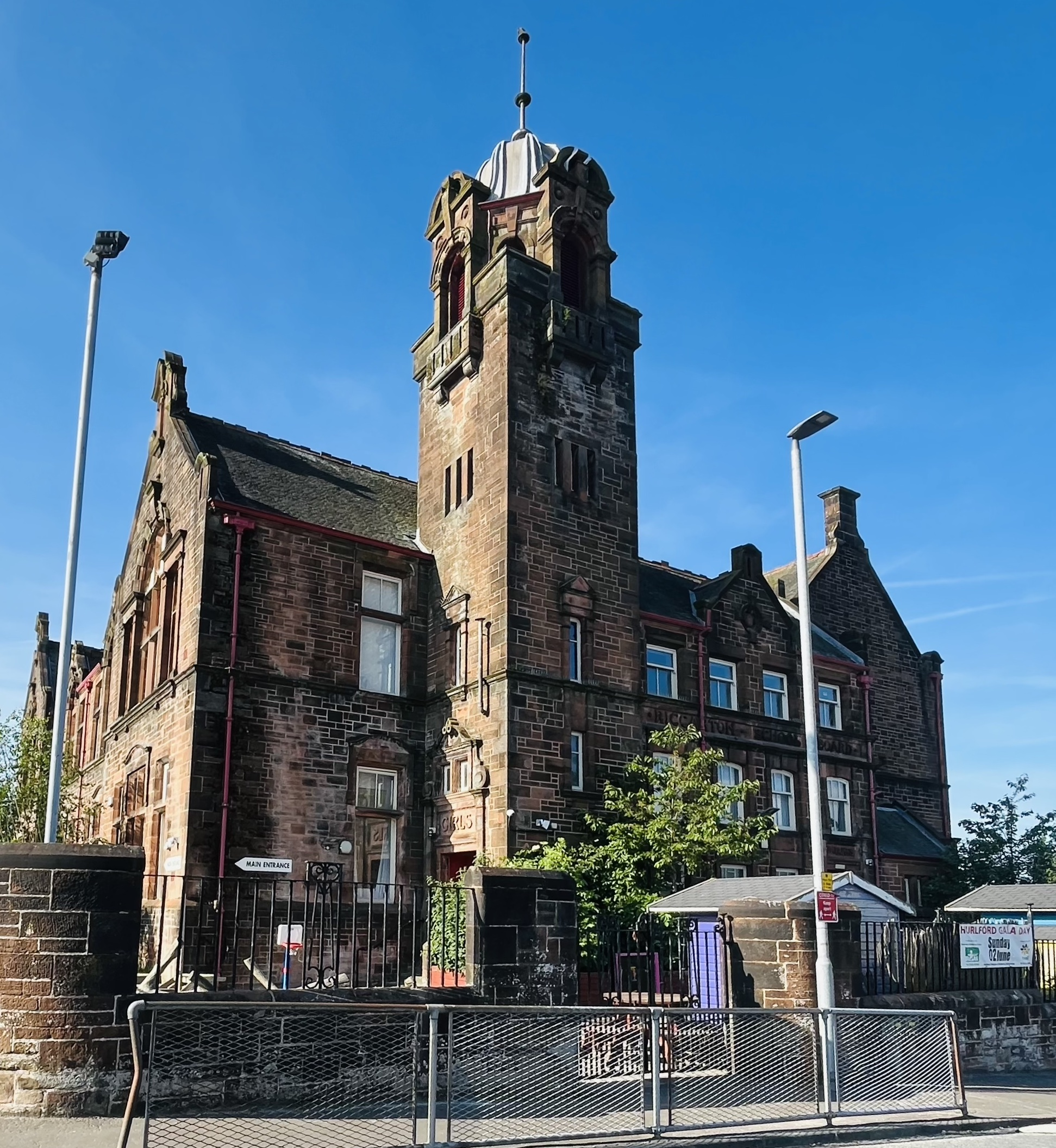
Hurlford Primary School

=== Hurlford Primary School ===
Hurlford Primary School, formerly Hurlford Grammar and Secondary School is the non-denominational primary school for the area and also houses Hurlford Early Childhood Centre. The building itself dates back to 1905. Prince Charles and Camilla, Duchess of Rothesay, visited and congratulated the staff and children on 20 June 2005 on their achievements transforming school meals, which was followed by the school winning the Soil Association's School Food Award at the BBC's Good Food Show, presented by Jamie Oliver.

Hurlford Primary School, and is associated Early Childhood Centre, underwent a £2.98 million re–development project beginning in April 2016. During the period of refurbishment, pupils were relocated to Loudoun Academy on the outskirts of Galston from 26 September 2016. Major work to the building included new windows throughout, as well as external stonework and groundworks.

=== Crossroads Primary School ===
Crossroads Primary School, now closed, formerly served the outlying areas of Hurlford and surrounding villages. It was closed by East Ayrshire Council as it was no longer financially viable to repair the building, despite parental and local protest. Pupils now attend Galston Primary School.

== Transport ==
Hurlford railway station is now closed. Hurlford also used to boast its own tramway system, which connected it to Kilmarnock. Nowadays, the main public transport links are provided by several Stagecoach West Scotland bus services, including direct services to Glasgow.

== Notable residents ==
- Gordon Cree – pianist, composer, conductor, musician and entertainer
- Ross Tollerton – British Army soldier in World War I who was awarded the Victoria Cross
- Robert Dunsmuir – industrialist, politician and developer of coal mines and the E&N Railway on Vancouver Island
- Jimmy Knapp – General Secretary of the RMT transport union
- George Wylie – awarded the George Cross in honour of his attempts to defuse a Nazi bomb which had landed on St Paul's Cathedral in London
- Peter Kirkbride – weightlifter, 2010 Commonwealth Games silver medalist

The village is often referred to as a "football nursery" due to its high output of footballers:

- Ian Bryson – Sheffield United F.C., Barnsley F.C., Preston North End F.C, and Rochdale A.F.C. footballer
- David Calderhead – Queen of the South and Notts County footballer and Chelsea F.C. manager
- William Goldie – Leicester City footballer
- Jack Picken – Manchester United, Bolton Wanderers and Plymouth Argyle footballer
- Andrew Ross – winger in the English Football League for Burnley
- Sandy Turnbull – Manchester City and Manchester United footballer
- Arthur Young – Manchester United footballer
- Jack Young – Kilmarnock and Bristol Rovers footballer
- Colin Douglas – Doncaster Rovers and Rotherham United footballer

== See also ==
- Shawhill Estate, East Ayrshire
