= Curling in Canada =

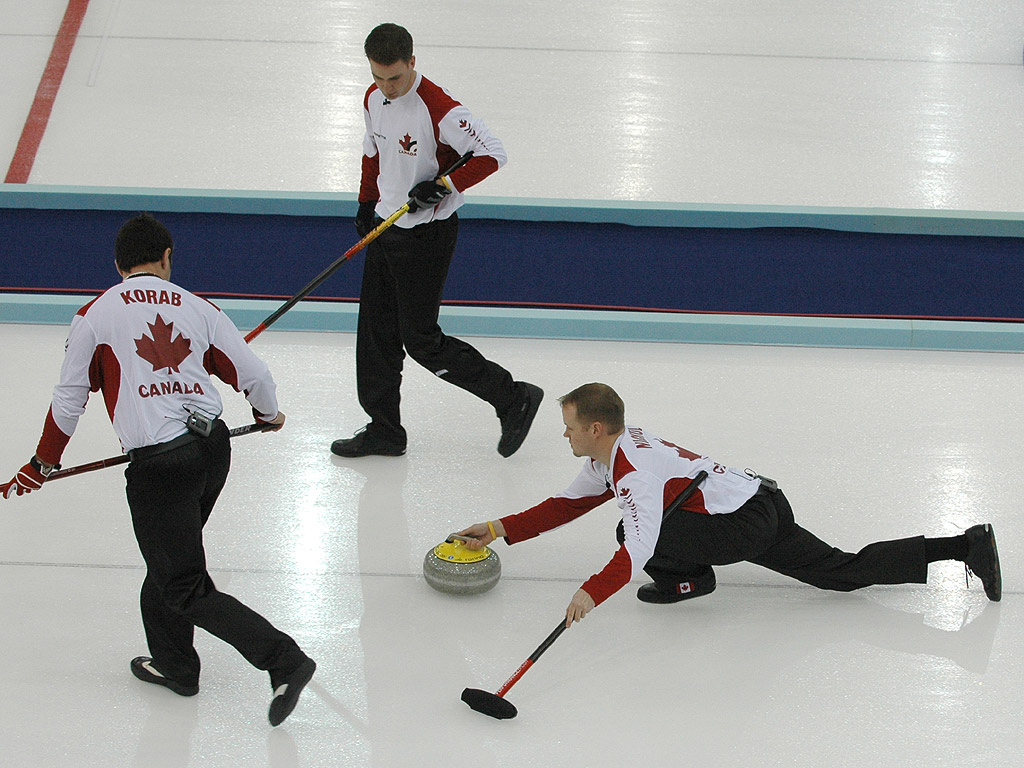
- The Canadian team during the 2006 Winter Olympics in Turin
- Governing body: Curling Canada
- First played: c. 1800
- Registered players: 157,788 (2022)
- Clubs: 965

National competitions
- The Brier; Scotties Tournament of Hearts

Club competitions
- Canadian Curling Club Championships

International competitions
- Winter Olympics; World Curling Championships

Curling is a popular winter sport that is played throughout Canada. It holds a significant place in Canadian culture and the country achieved considerable success at the international level. The nation is the biggest market for stones manufactured by Kays of Scotland as of 2025.

Curling Canada serves as the sanctioning body of the sport in the country, it is associated with 14 provincial and territorial curling associations throughout the country (Canada 13 provinces and territories plus Northern Ontario), and it regulates and organizes Canada's national championships in the sport.

Canada's national championships include Scotties Tournament of Hearts women's national championship, the Montana's Brier national men's championship, the Canadian Mixed Curling Championship, the Canadian Senior Curling Championships, the Canadian Wheelchair Curling Championship, the Canadian Under-20 Curling Championships, the Canadian U18 Curling Championships, the CCAA/Curling Canada College Curling Championships, the Canadian Curling Club Championships, the Canadian Mixed Doubles Curling Championship and the U Sports curling championships.

== History ==
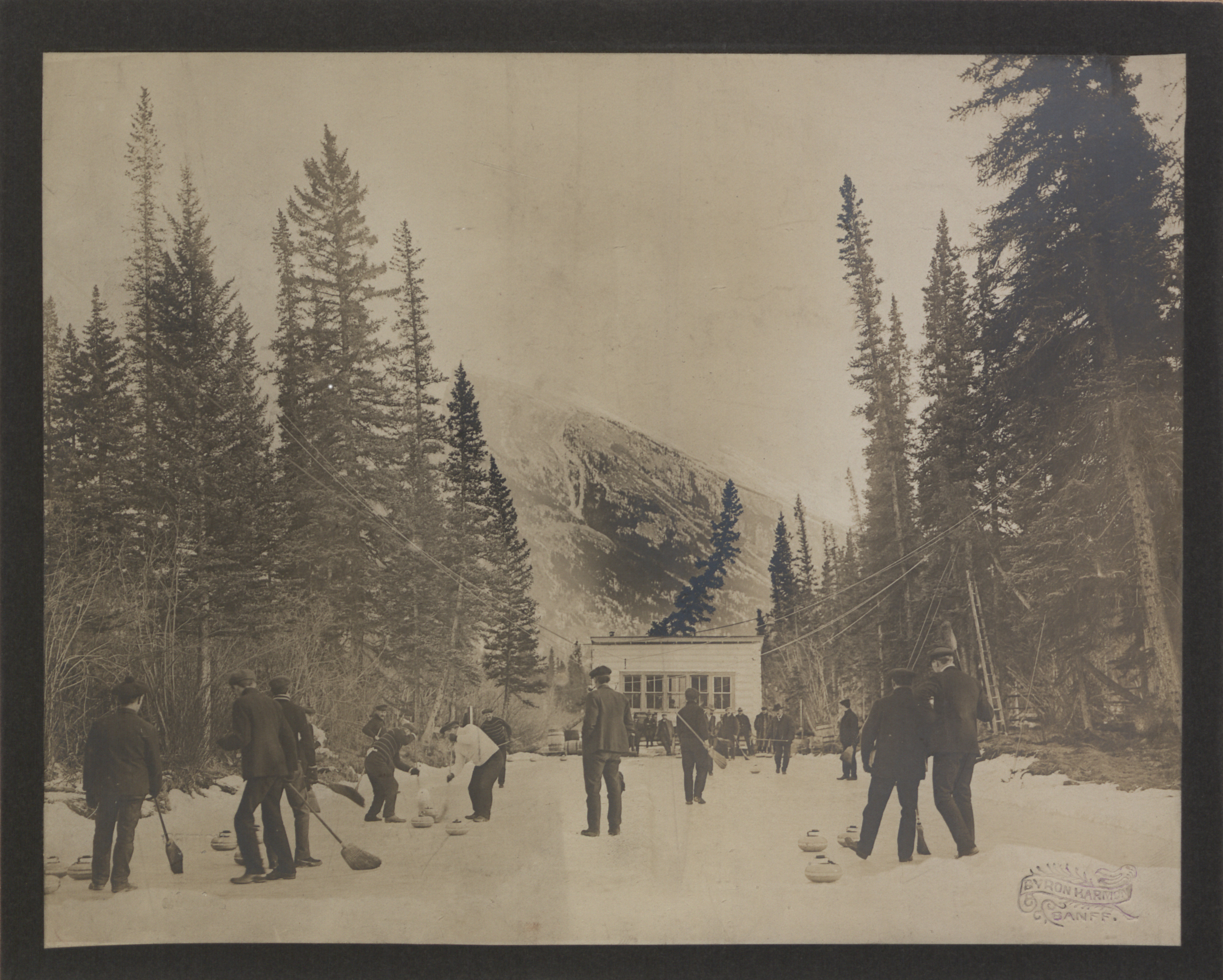
Canadians playing curling in Banff, 1906.

Curling's roots in Canada can be traced back to Scottish immigrants in the early 18th century. Scottish settlers, who were familiar with curling from their homeland, introduced the game to Canada as a way to maintain their cultural traditions. The sport gained popularity among the Scottish communities in the country, and it spread to other regions.

The first recorded curling match in Canada took place in Montreal in 1807 when twenty merchants, mostly Scottish formed the Montreal Curling Club, making it the first organized sporting club in North America.

At the time, pioneers of the sport used stones made out of iron in a similar shape of a tea kettle, they were the primary equipment used. These stones varied in weight for both genders, men could expect their stones to be 60 to 80 pounds (27 to 36 kg) and women could expect 40 to 48 pounds (18 to 21 kg). There are no records, in Scotland or anywhere else, indicating the use of iron stones. In Canada, they became the preferred choice among curlers, including those in the Montreal Curling Club.

In the early 1820s, Scottish immigrants would continue to form curling clubs around the country, most notably in the major cities of Kingston, Québec City and Halifax.

By 1839, Curling grew prominent enough within the country for vendors in Toronto to be selling custom and local made granite stones for the sport. In 1840, "The Canadian Curler's Manual" by James Bicket, secretary of the Toronto Curling Club was published, making it Canada's first book on curling.

The Canadian curling scene experienced a surge in competitive fervor during the early years, marked by the emergence of teams engaging in intercity matchups, commencing in 1835. In 1858, teams began engaging in interprovincial competitions, and subsequently, in 1865, a significant milestone was achieved with the inaugural international bonspiel held in Buffalo, New York, where Canadian and American clubs came together to compete.

The harsh winter Canadian weather conditions posed challenges on the practice of curling, in 1838, the Montreal Curling Club were likely the first team to move the sport indoors, other clubs would follow their lead and by 1859, Toronto had its first indoor facility, soon after, indoor curling rinks became common across the nation. This subsequently helped the growth of ice hockey as by the 1890s, the sport became increasingly popular and most would-be professional teams used curling rinks to house their games.

== National team ==
Since the reinstatement of the sport to the Olympics in 1998, both the Canadian men's and women's national curling teams have maintained an unbroken record of participation in every Winter Olympics' curling event. Canada has had large success in the sport, they are considered to be the strongest team in the history of national curling.

=== Men's ===
The Men's Canadian national curling team has achieved historic success, amassing 36 gold medals in World Curling Championships, making them the most decorated team in the history of the sport. In addition, their total medal count in the event stands at an impressive 57, further solidifying their position as the all-time leader. This sets them apart from their closest contender, Scotland, who holds 6 gold medals and 36 total medals, respectively.

The team has also seen success at the Olympic level, garnering the most gold medals in the history of the event with a total of 3, which they won consecutively. They have placed on podium for all years they have participated in, but one at the 2018 Pyeongchang Winter Olympics where they placed 4th.

At the 2026 Olympics the team won gold.

=== Women's ===
The Women's Canadian national curling team have also achieved historic success, amassing 18 gold medals and 37 total medals in World Curling Championships, making them the most decorated in women's curling.

The team has earned two Olympic gold medals, placing them second in the overall rankings, just behind Sweden with three gold medals. They are also among the seven teams tied for the most total medals, with a combined count of seven.
