= Kays of Scotland =

Curling stone manufacturer

Coordinates: 55.514312°N 4.381062°W

Andrew Kay & Company (Curling Stones) Limited
- Industry: Manufacturing
- Founded: 1851; 175 years ago in Mauchline, East Ayrshire, Scotland
- Founders: William Kay; Andrew Kay; Thomas Kay
- Headquarters: Mauchline
- Products: Curling stones
- Services: Manufacture and servicing of curling stones
- Owner: James Wyllie
- Website: kayscurling.com

Andrew Kay & Company (Curling Stones) Limited, trading as Kays Scotland, is the only remaining UK manufacturer and supplier of curling stones. Founded in 1851, it retains exclusive rights to harvest granite from Ailsa Craig, granted by the Marquess of Ailsa. Kays of Scotland produces the only stones used in competition by the World Curling Federation and is the sole supplier of curling stones to the Winter Olympic Games.

== History ==
Prior to the foundation of Kays of Scotland, there was little regulation to the sport of curling and stones of any shape or size were used. Through a process of elimination, stones from Ailsa Craig were found to be highly resistant to splintering, making them desirable for this purpose.

In 1851, William Kay and sons Andrew and Thomas created Kays of Mauchline, a workshop in Haugh, East Ayrshire, Scotland and later received permission from the family who owned the island of Ailsa Craig to harvest granite for the manufacture of curling stones.

The company eventually found itself under the stewardship of Thomas Kay's wife's brother-in-law, James Wyllie, and has remained a business wholly owned by the Wyllie family. Descendant James "Jimmy" Wyllie currently owns the company.

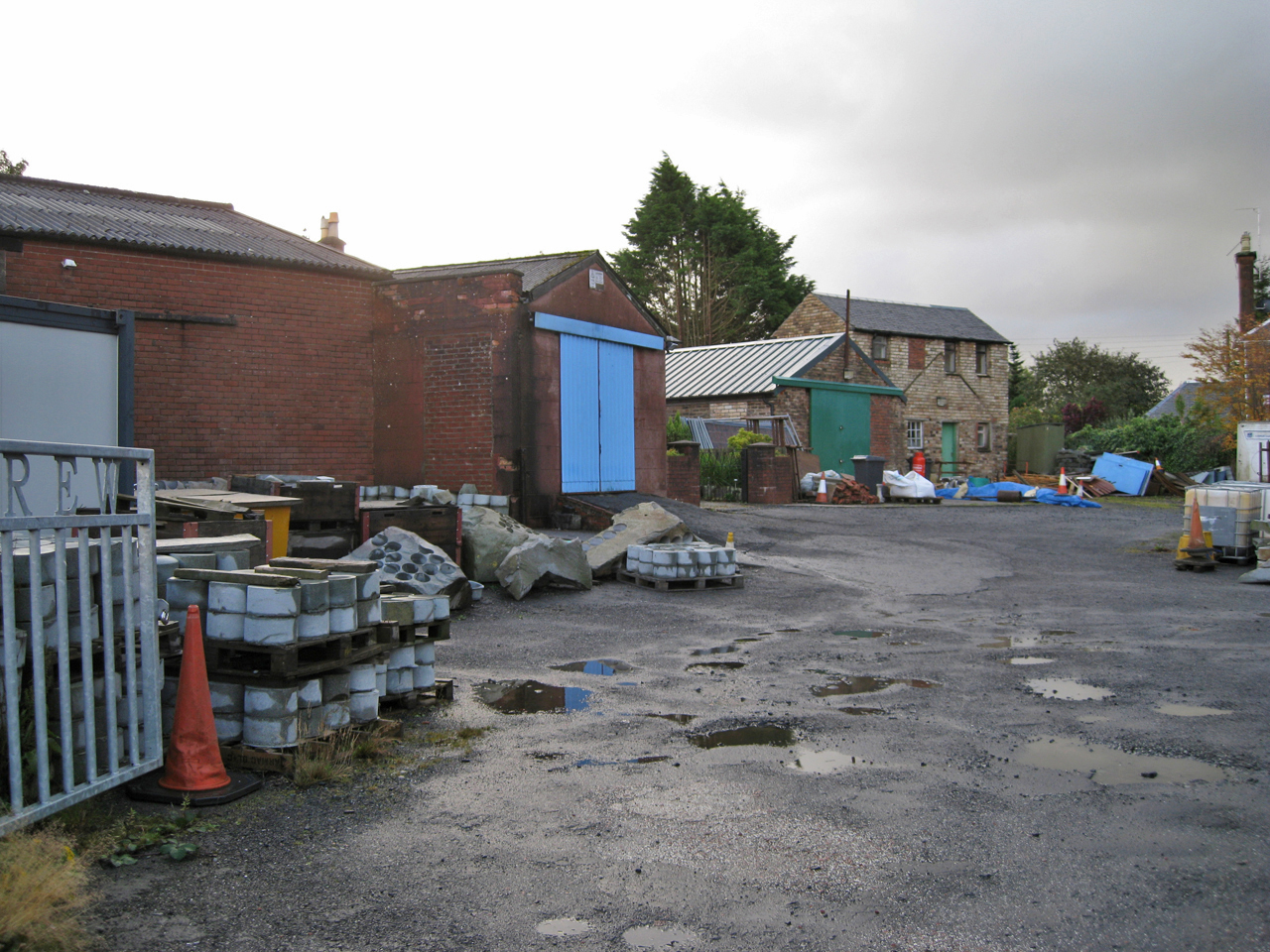
Several granite blanks to be used in manufacture of curling stones.

In 1911, Kays of Scotland moved their operation 2 kilometres (1.2 mi) north from their original water-powered mill at the bank of the River Ayr by Mauchline.

A shipment of 278 Kays Excelsior Ailsa curling stones destined for three curling clubs in Canada was among the cargo of the SS Athenia passenger liner when a torpedo from a German submarine sank her in the Western Approaches on 3 September 1939. This was the first British ship to be sunk by Germany during World War II.

Kays of Scotland have supplied curling stones to every Winter Olympic Games since Chamonix in 1924, with the exception of the 2002 event in Salt Lake City. For the 2026 Winter Olympics, Kays also produced official giftware, such as miniature curling stones, drink cubes, and coasters.

== Manufacture of curling stones ==
For the main body of each curling stone Kays uses Ailsa Craig Common Green granite. Kays inserts Ailsa Craig Blue Hone granite "Ailserts" as the running surface of the stone. Each curling stone weighs approximately 18 kilograms. Each game requires 16 stones. The manufacturing process takes about six hours per stone. Machines are used to shape the stone, join the two granites, and drill a hole for the handle. The stones are polished with pumice and diamond pads.

Due to its status as a wildlife reserve by the Royal Society for the Protection of Birds, blasting and quarrying at Ailsa Craig is restricted. In 2002, Kays of Scotland was permitted to collect 1,500 tons of granite already displaced on the island. Its last collection of granite from the island was in 2013, harvesting 2,000 tons, expected to yield 10,000 curling stones.

The Kays workshop employs six craftsmen and produces five stones a day. The company manufactures 1,800 to 2,000 stones per year as of 2025, with Canada as its biggest market. In 2026, a stone costs £750 (US$1,030).
