= List of listed buildings in Mauchline, East Ayrshire =

This is a list of listed buildings in the parish of Mauchline in East Ayrshire, Scotland.

== List ==
Name	Location	Date Listed	Grid Ref. (Note: Sometimes known as OSGB36, the grid reference (where provided) is based on the British national grid reference system used by the Ordnance Survey. • "Guide to National Grid". Ordnance Survey. • "Get-a-map". Ordnance Survey.)	Geo-coordinates	Notes	LB Number (Note: Historic Environment Scotland assign a unique alphanumeric identifier to each designated site in Scotland, for listed buildings this always begins with "LB", for example "LB12345".)	Image
Nos. 2 And 4 Castle Street. (Jean Armour Burns' House And Museum)				55°30′58″N 4°22′47″W	Category B	14473	Upload Photo
East Mossgiel Farm				55°31′36″N 4°23′40″W	Category B	14480	Upload another image See more images
Kingencleugh				55°30′13″N 4°22′11″W	Category C(S)	14482	Upload Photo
Lodge And Gatepiers Rodinghead				55°33′21″N 4°24′17″W	Category B	14488	Upload Photo
East Welton				55°30′53″N 4°21′31″W	Category B	19661	Upload Photo
Lodge And Gatepiers Netherplace, New Road				55°31′06″N 4°22′59″W	Category B	19702	Upload Photo
Mauchline Old Parish Church And Graveyard				55°30′56″N 4°22′50″W	Category B	14470	Upload another image See more images
Old Stables, Barskimming				55°29′52″N 4°24′14″W	Category B	14489	Upload Photo
West Welton				55°30′51″N 4°21′51″W	Category C(S)	14491	Upload Photo
Martyr's Grave				55°31′01″N 4°22′33″W	Category B	14477	Upload Photo
Rodinghead				55°33′23″N 4°24′23″W	Category B	14486	Upload Photo
Ballochmyle House, Ice House				55°30′26″N 4°20′38″W	Category C(S)	50609	Upload Photo
Old Barskimming, Walled Garden				55°29′50″N 4°24′10″W	Category C(S)	19259	Upload Photo
Nos 1-17 (Odd Numbers) Loudoun Street. (E. Bowie, Chemist) (William Bee, Druggist) (Lyall Stores), (Connell's Drapers) (N.M. Mcarvail, Cigarettes)				55°30′56″N 4°22′46″W	Category B	14475	Upload Photo
Poosie Nansies				55°30′56″N 4°22′47″W	Category B	14476	Upload Photo
Ballochmyle Railway Viaduct				55°29′58″N 4°21′44″W	Category A	14483	Upload another image See more images
Former Ballochmyle Creamery At Haugh Of Mauchline Including Garden Buildings And Egg-Ended Boiler				55°29′56″N 4°22′58″W	Category B	14492	Upload Photo
Haughbank House At Former Ballochymyle Creamery, Haugh Of Mauchline				55°29′56″N 4°22′57″W	Category C(S)	14493	Upload Photo
House In High Street (No. 3)				55°30′58″N 4°22′45″W	Category B	19701	Upload Photo
Kingencleugh Castle				55°30′06″N 4°22′15″W	Category B	14481	Upload another image See more images
Howford Bridge				55°29′59″N 4°21′06″W	Category B	14484	Upload Photo
Mauchline Castle. (Abbot Hunter's Tower)				55°30′57″N 4°22′51″W	Category A	14471	Upload Photo
Burns National Memorial And Cottage Homes				55°31′19″N 4°23′17″W	Category B	14479	Upload another image See more images
Ballochmyle Bridge				55°30′02″N 4°21′03″W	Category B	14485	Upload Photo
West Lodge				55°30′32″N 4°21′24″W	Category C(S)	19703	Upload Photo
Auld Nanse Tinnock's Castle Street				55°30′57″N 4°22′47″W	Category B	14474	Upload Photo
Gavin Hamilton's House				55°30′57″N 4°22′51″W	Category B	14472	Upload Photo
Summerhouse, Springfield - (At Junction Of High Street And Welton Road)				55°30′59″N 4°22′38″W	Category B	14478	Upload Photo
Ballochmyle House				55°30′31″N 4°20′36″W	Category B	14487	Upload another image

== Key ==
The scheme for classifying buildings in Scotland is:

- Category A: "buildings of national or international importance, either architectural or historic; or fine, little-altered examples of some particular period, style or building type."
- Category B: "buildings of regional or more than local importance; or major examples of some particular period, style or building type, which may have been altered."
- Category C: "buildings of local importance; lesser examples of any period, style, or building type, as originally constructed or moderately altered; and simple traditional buildings which group well with other listed buildings."

In March 2016 there were 47,288 listed buildings in Scotland. Of these, 8% were Category A, and 50% were Category B, with the remaining 42% being Category C.

== See also ==
- List of listed buildings in East Ayrshire
