= Kingencleugh Castle =

Castle in East Ayrshire, Scotland

- Mauchline, East Ayrshire, Scotland; UK grid reference NS30655083
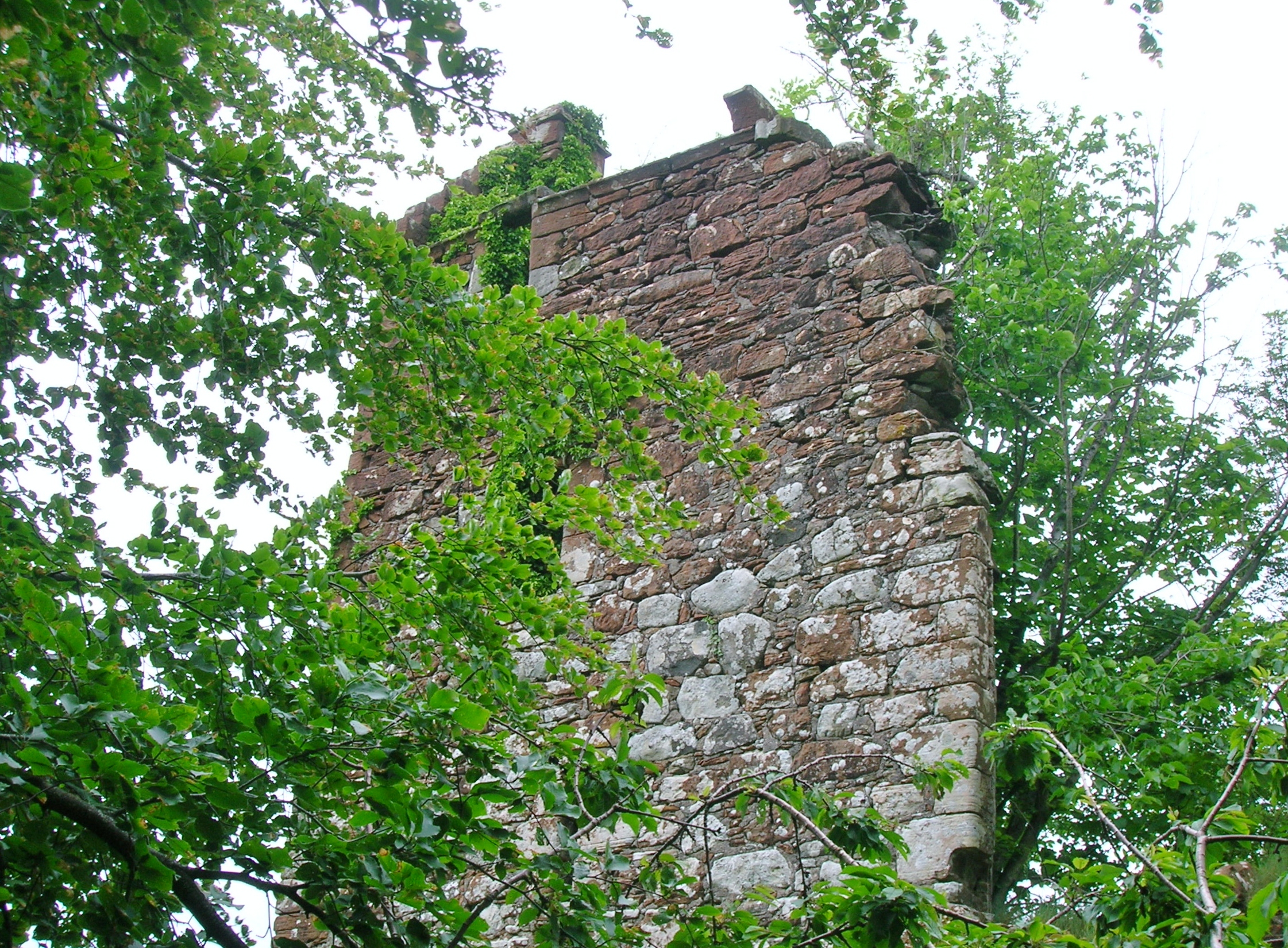

Site information
- Type: L-shaped Tower house
- Owner: Private
- Open to the public: No
- Condition: Ruined

Location
- Shown within Scotland
- Coordinates: 55.501784°N 4.3708°W
- Grid reference: NS 50351 25666

Site history
- Built: c 1620
- Built by: Campbells of Cessnock
- Materials: Stone

The remains of the old castle of Kingencleugh or Kingenclough lies close to east of the town of Mauchline, East Ayrshire, in the old Barony of Mauchline off the A76. The castle is Category B listed.

== The history of Kingencleugh Castle ==
From the remains, this appears to have been built as a dwelling with defence as a secondary consideration. John Knox is said to have visited it in 1556. Kingencleugh was built as one of several castles built as border markers for the Campbell feus in the area. Kingencleugh latterly became part of the Ballochmyle estate. The present castle was built around 1620 to replace the older fortification that Knox would have known. The castle was abandoned once the new house was built. The Campbells held the property until the end of the 18th century.

Kingencleugh was the residence successively of Hugh and Robert Campbell, both ardent reformers. George Wishart and John Knox were entertained here and Knox also preached at this castle when he visited Mauchline in 1556. On his death bed it was to Robert Campbell that Knox said: "I rely on you becoming to them (his wife and children) as a husband and a father in my room."

Dobie records that John Knox was conducted by Lochhart of Bar and Campbell of Kineancleugh to Kyle, the ancient receptacle of the Scottish Lollards, where there were a number of adherents to the reformed doctrine. He preached in the houses of Bar, Kineancleugh, Carnell, Ochiltree, and Gadgirth, and in the town of Ayr. In several of these places he also dispensed the Sacrament of Our Lord's Supper.

=== The castle ruins ===
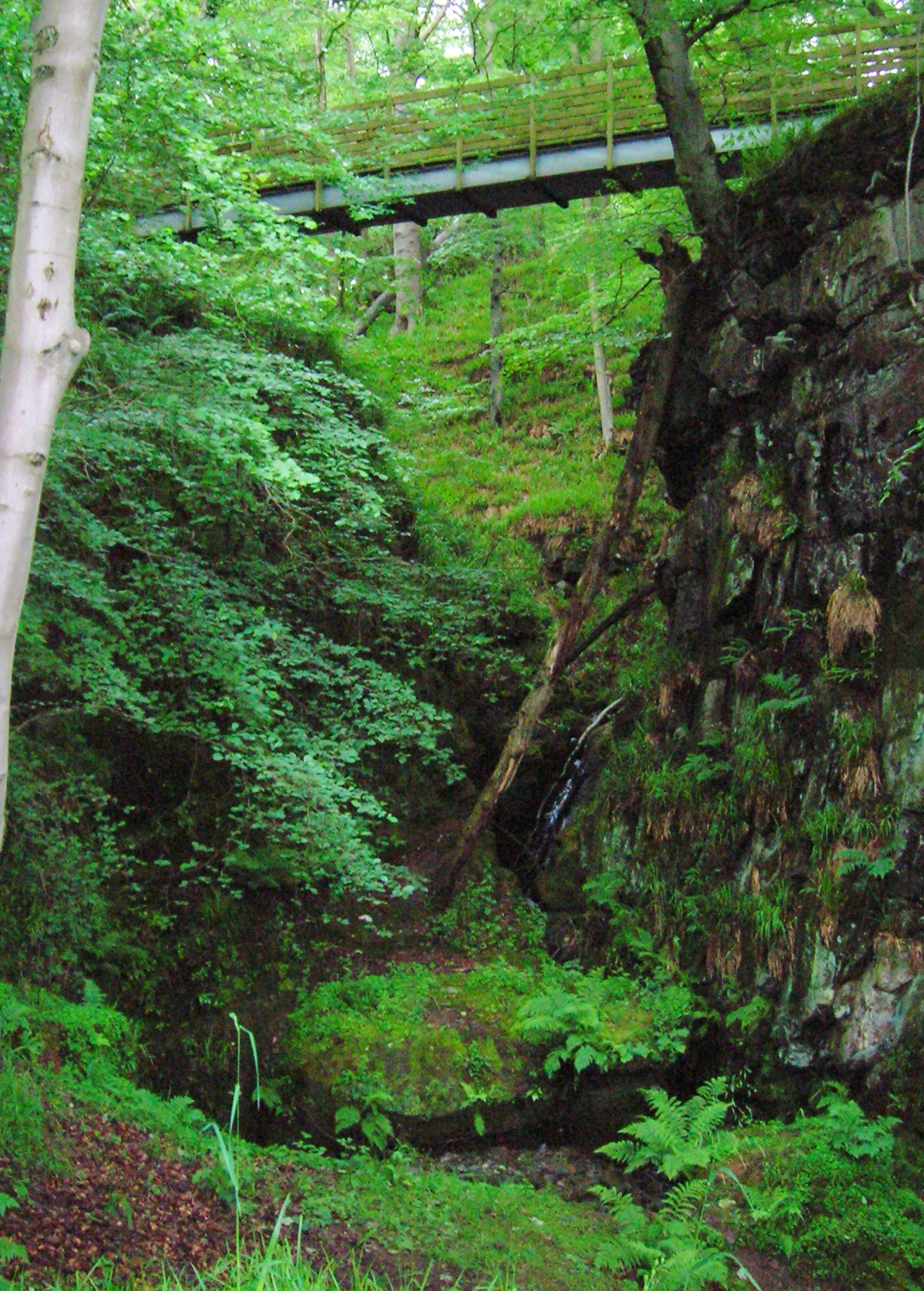
Robert Burns' Bath.

The remains lie above the Kingen Cleugh Glen and burn and are those of a four-storey L-shaped residence of ashlar-ended rubble masonry. The remaining walls are 0.8m thick; the two lower floors have slit windows only. The north-west wall, forming the end of the western arm of the 'L', stands to its full height of around 7.0 m, and is surmounted by a crow-stepped gable. The lower part of a corbelled turret remains in the re-entrant angle, in the western arm of which is the entrance. The main ground-floor apartment appears to have been barrel-vaulted. The house is in a fairly defensible situation, overlooking ground sloping to the south. A 'Cleugh' is a narrow gorge or chasm with high rocky sides in Scots. Jerviston House is of a very similar design.

Kingencleugh overlooks the Lily or Kingen Cleugh Glen and the burn that runs into the nearby River Ayr. Local tradition states that a subterranean passage or ley tunnel runs between Mauchline Castle and Kingencleugh.

=== The Lily Glen and Robert Burns ===
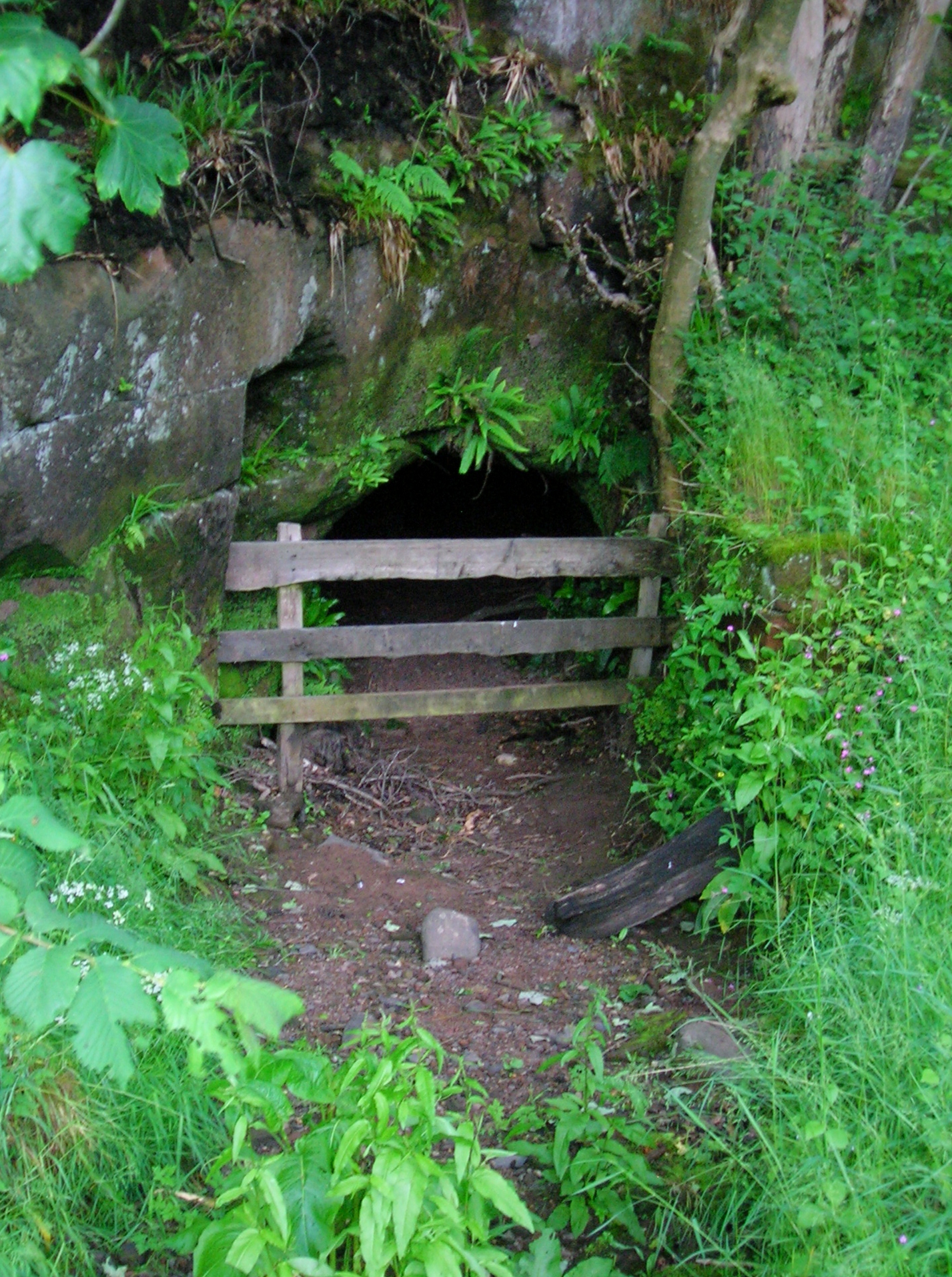
Haugh Mill Lade tunnel.

The Lily Glen or Kingen Cleugh Glen contains a small rivulet that runs down to the River Ayr. The lilies usually refer to daffodils in Scots, however lily can also be a general term for wild garlic or bluebells. The glen is rich in old woodland indicator plants such as woodruff, wood sorrel, bluebell, woodrush, cow wheat, enchanter's nightshade, creeping jenny, wood millet, dog's mercury, etc.

Local tradition maintains that Robert Burns used to visit the glen to enjoy a dip in the Kingencleugh Burn when he lived at Mossgiel Farm near Mauchline. An old stone bath or cistern still exists with moss covered steps running down to it. Locals would point out this site as being his bathing place and a vague memory of a Lady Sophia is also associated with this site. Burns is known to have frequented the area and he praised these 'Braes of Ballochmyle' in his poem to The Lass of Ballochmyle who he observed in the half-twilight near the site of the old 'Fog House.'

The Lass of Ballochmyle

"With careless step I onward stray'd,
My heart rejoic'd in Nature's joy,
When, musing in a lonely glade,
A maiden fair I chanc'd to spy.
Her look was like the morning's eye,
Her air like Nature's vernal smile.
Perfection whisper'd, passing by:-
Behold the lass o' Ballochmyle!"

The OS maps show a stone bath or cistern at the bottom of the Kingen Cleugh Glen where all the burn waters were diverted into it, leaving via a tunnel cut through the rock and then running down the Haugh hamlet, situated about two and a half miles downstream from Catrine, on the north bank of the River Ayr. In 1837 there was a woollen mill, and a corn and saw mill, drawing water from the aforementioned cistern, about a quarter of a mile upstream. The lade was tunnelled through the soft red sandstone of the river gorge, and the tunnel mouths can both be seen, as can two stone arched footbridges over the lade, and an overflow sluice. No traces of the woollen mill, which in 1837 employed thirty persons Spinning yarn for a Kilmarnock carpet factory, have survived.

== Kingencleugh House ==
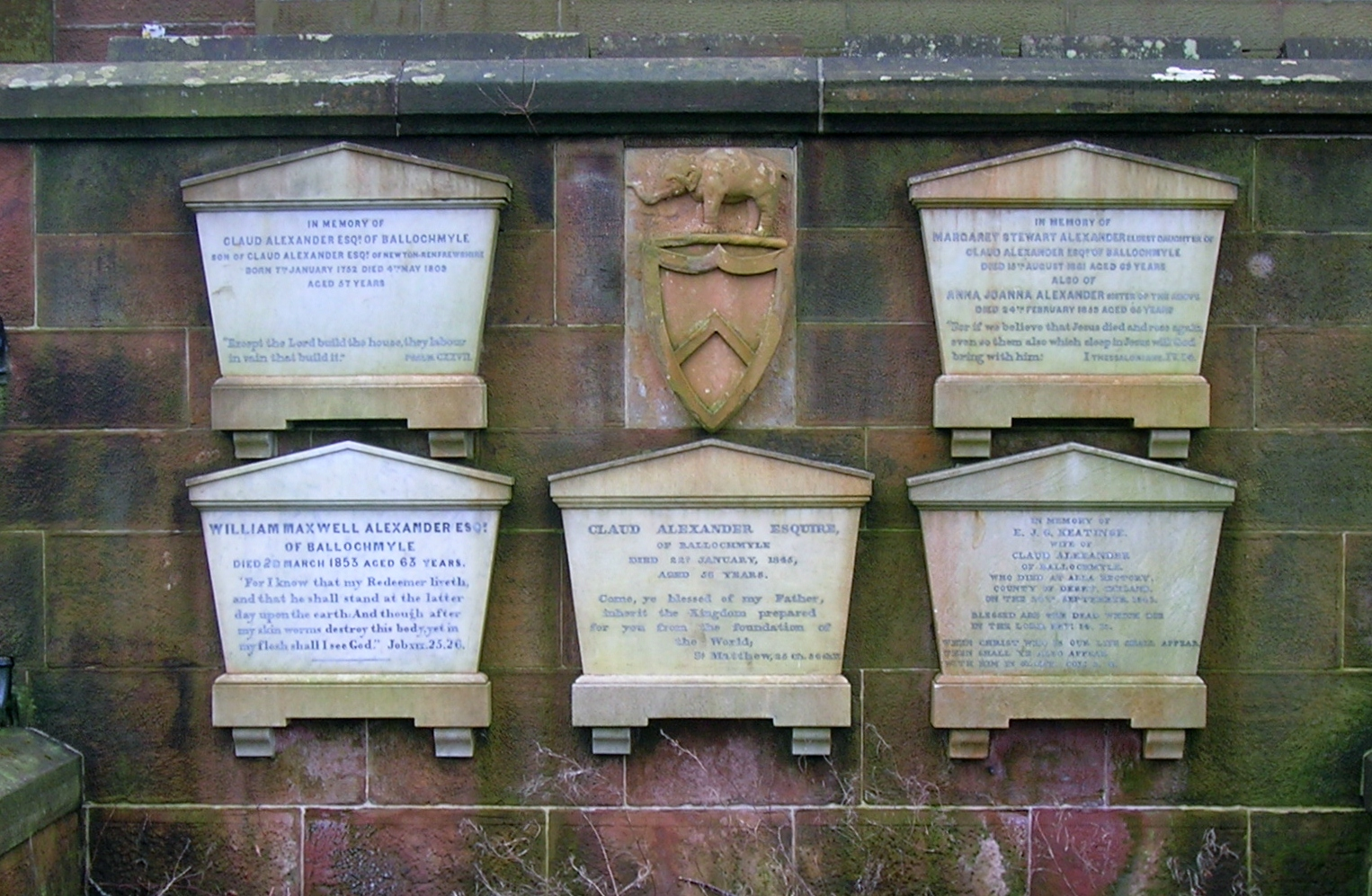
Alexander family crest and memorials in Mauchline cemetery.

The present day manor house was erected around 1765 and later rebuilt to plans by Mervyn Noad as a dower house to Ballochmyle in 1957. An elephant was the family crest and this appears over the door.

=== Cartographic evidence ===
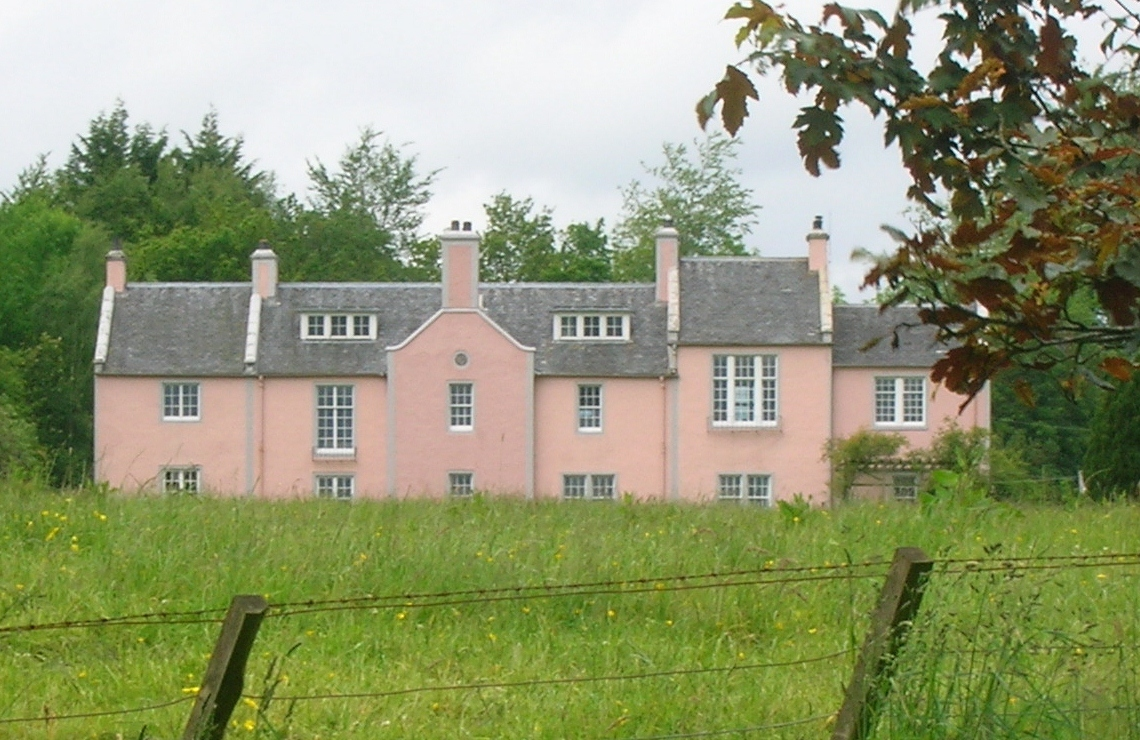
Kingencleugh House.

Robert Gordon's map of 1636–52 shows Kinzancleuch (sic). Kinzankcleug is recorded on the Timothy Pont map of circa 1602. Moll records a Monfod. Roy's map of 1747 shows the castle as 'Kings Cleugh'. Armstrong's map of 1775 shows the old castle ruins as 'Kingincleugh' with the house nearby. Thomson's map of 1832 shows 'Kingscleugh'.

== Associated families ==
=== The Campbells ===
The Campbells, cadets of the Campbells of Cessnock and Loudoun, are the first recorded lairds in the fifteenth century. Hugh Campbell may have been the son of Sir George Campbell of Loudoun and his mentioned by John Knox in connection with George Wishart being refused entry to preach in the kirk of Mauchline by those opposing reform. Robert Campbell of Kingencleugh (d. 1574) stood surety for a friend who was implicated in the plot that led to the murder of David Rizzio and was a good friend of John Knox as previously stated, and attended him during his final illness. He had a daughter, Elizabeth, and married Elizabeth Campbell. This daughter inherited the lands and castle in 1586 and had a son, John, however the name of her husband is not recorded.

The "Memorial" to the couple by John Davidson reads :

"But to be plainer is nae skaith,
Of surnames, they were Campbells baith;
Of ancient blood of the countrie,
They were baith of genealogie:
He of the Sheriff's house of Air,
Long, noble, famous, and preclair:
She of a gude and godly stock,
Come of the old house of Cessnock,
Quais lord of many years bygane
Professed Christ's religion plain;
Yea, eighty years sinsyne and mair,
As I heard aged men declare."

John Campbell of Kingencleugh became heir to his mother in 1627 and to his grandfather in 1636; he may have had a brother in joint possession as a Charles Campbell of Kingencleugh is recorded in 1625. John Craufurd of Craufurdland's daughter Agnes married John Campbell of Kingencleugh, son of the previous John, and the couple had two sons, Hugh and George, and a daughter. Hugh inherited and married Elizabeith, the daughter of Sir Hugh Campbell of Cessnock. His son John inherited and married Elizabeth Adair, daughter of the minister of Ayr. His heir was another John, a zealous elder of the kirk, who married Anna Kennedy of Daljarroch. He died circa 1752 and their daughter married a Mr. McGill; the couple had no offspring.

In 1781 John Howie of Lochgoin records, as stated, that Hugh Campbell of Kinzeancleuch, younger son of Sir George Campbell of Loudoun, was a strong supporter of the Reformation and entertained fellow adherents at his residence. Circa 1539 the Sheriff of Ayr sent troops to Mauchline church so as to prevent the reformist George Wishart from preaching and Hugh Campbell and others had intended to force entry however Wishart declined the offer and preached instead on Mauchline Muir close to the old loch.

The Campbells of Kingancleuch (sic) are frequently mention in the records occur until the late 18th century.

=== The Alexanders ===
On the death of the last Campbell of Kingencleugh, Mrs McGill, Mr. Alexander of Ballochmyle purchased the property. Alexander, later Hagart-Alexander Baronetcy, of Ballochmyle is a title created in 1886 for Major-General Claud Alexander, who served in the Crimean War. Sir Claud Hagart-Alexander, 4th Baronet (b. 1963), now lives at Kingencleugh House, the family having long left Ballochmyle House which they had acquired in 1785.

== A Legend of Kingcleugh Castle ==
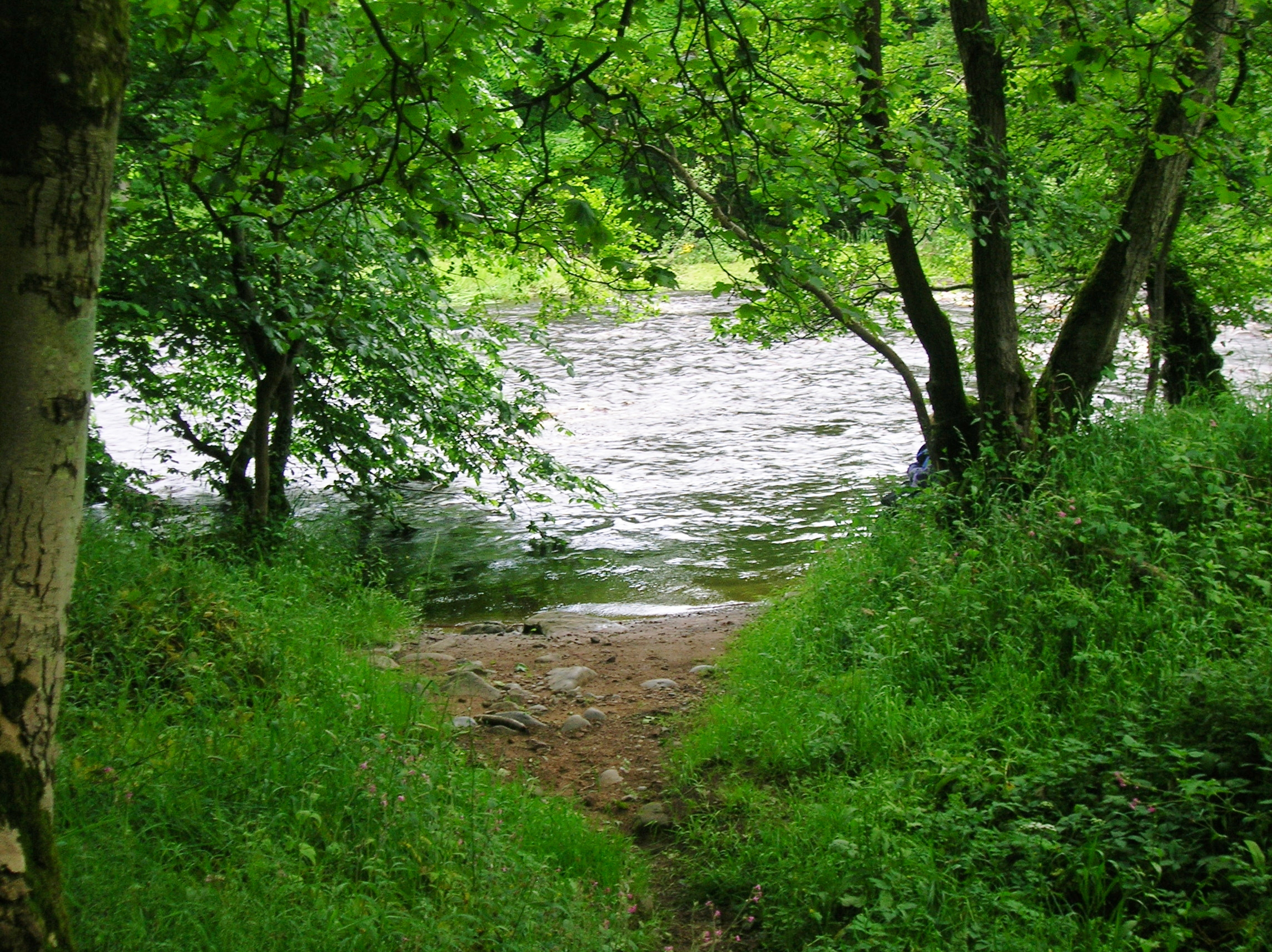
The Damhead Ford over the River Ayr.

In 1253 Sir Percy Seton fell in love with Mona, the daughter of the 'rude and almost savage' Cormac of the Cleugh, Laird of Kingcleugh, known as 'King of the Cleugh' or the 'Hunter King'. Cormac refused to allow Sir Percy to marry his daughter. Cormac was obsessed with the sport of hunting wild boar in the woods to the west of Kingcleugh. The skins and heads of his many kills over the years were kept at trophies within one the vaults in the castle. One day, whilst hunting boar in the forest of Kolium, some miles to the west of his castle, near the River Ayr, he chanced upon the deep and secluded lair of an exceptional boar.

This ferocious creature however killed all his boar-hounds. The laird attempted to force his head huntsman to enter the animal's den and upon refusal he hit him with his boar-spear, knocking him off balance, resulting in the retainers terrible death at the 'tusks' of the creature after falling into the boars lair. The laird was superstitious and believed that the dead man's spirit and the ghost of the boar haunted the vault of his castle. Sir Percy hit upon the plan of using the ley tunnel that ran between the castle of Mauchline and that of Kingcleugh to enter the vault, and Mona, having been informed of the plot, ensured that her forced wedding to a man chosen by her father, was close to the vault. At the critical point in the ceremony the bloodied ghost of the dead huntsman appeared to burst forth from the sealed vault. The apparition seized the bride and then secretly carried her away to Mauchline Castle, via the tunnel, in the arms of her beloved.

== Micro-history ==
Lady Cecilia Brabazon, aunt of Mr Alexander of Ballochmyle, lived for many years in a cottage (Kingencleugh House?) near the old castle tower of Kingencleugh.

Miss Wilhelmina Alexander of Ballochmyle is Robert Burns' Bonnie Lass of Ballochmyle who he observed in the half-twilight near Ballochmyle House in the Braes of Ballochmyle. The old 'Fog House' was said to mark the site of his sighting of her. Wilhelmina never married and kept the poet's letter and manuscript all of her life.

The lands of Over and Nether Haugh became known as Kinzeancleuche or Kingencleugh.

A prisoner of war camp was located at Kingencleugh.

Robert Burns' father in law is said to have been involved in the building of the old 1750 Howford Bridge that lies below the site of Catrine House.

The famous Ballochmyle cup and ring marks are located on the estate.

== See also ==
- List of castles in East Ayrshire
- List of listed buildings in Mauchline, East Ayrshire
