= Ballochmyle Viaduct =

High railway viaduct in Ayrshire, Scotland

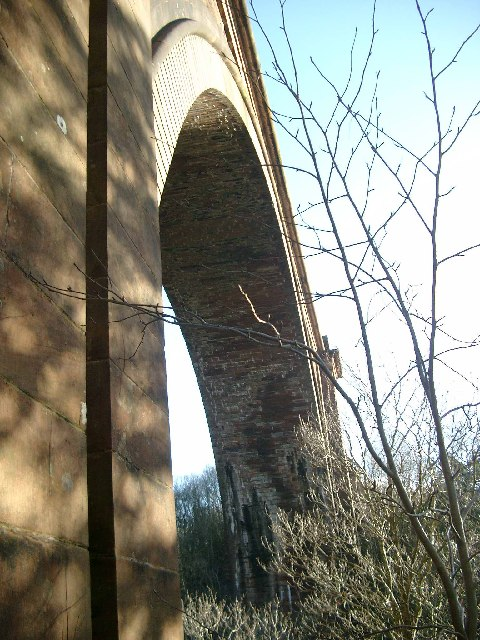
- Coordinates: 55.4995175°N 4.3625094°W
- Carries: Glasgow South Western Line
- Crosses: River Ayr

Characteristics
- Material: Stone
- Height: 169 feet (52 m)
- Longest span: 181 feet (55 m)
- No. of spans: 7

History
- Construction start: March 1846
- Construction end: 2 March 1848
- Opened: 9 August 1850

Listed Building – Category A
- Official name: Ballochmyle Railway Viaduct
- Designated: 13 April 1971
- Reference no.: LB14483

Location
- Interactive map of Ballochmyle Viaduct

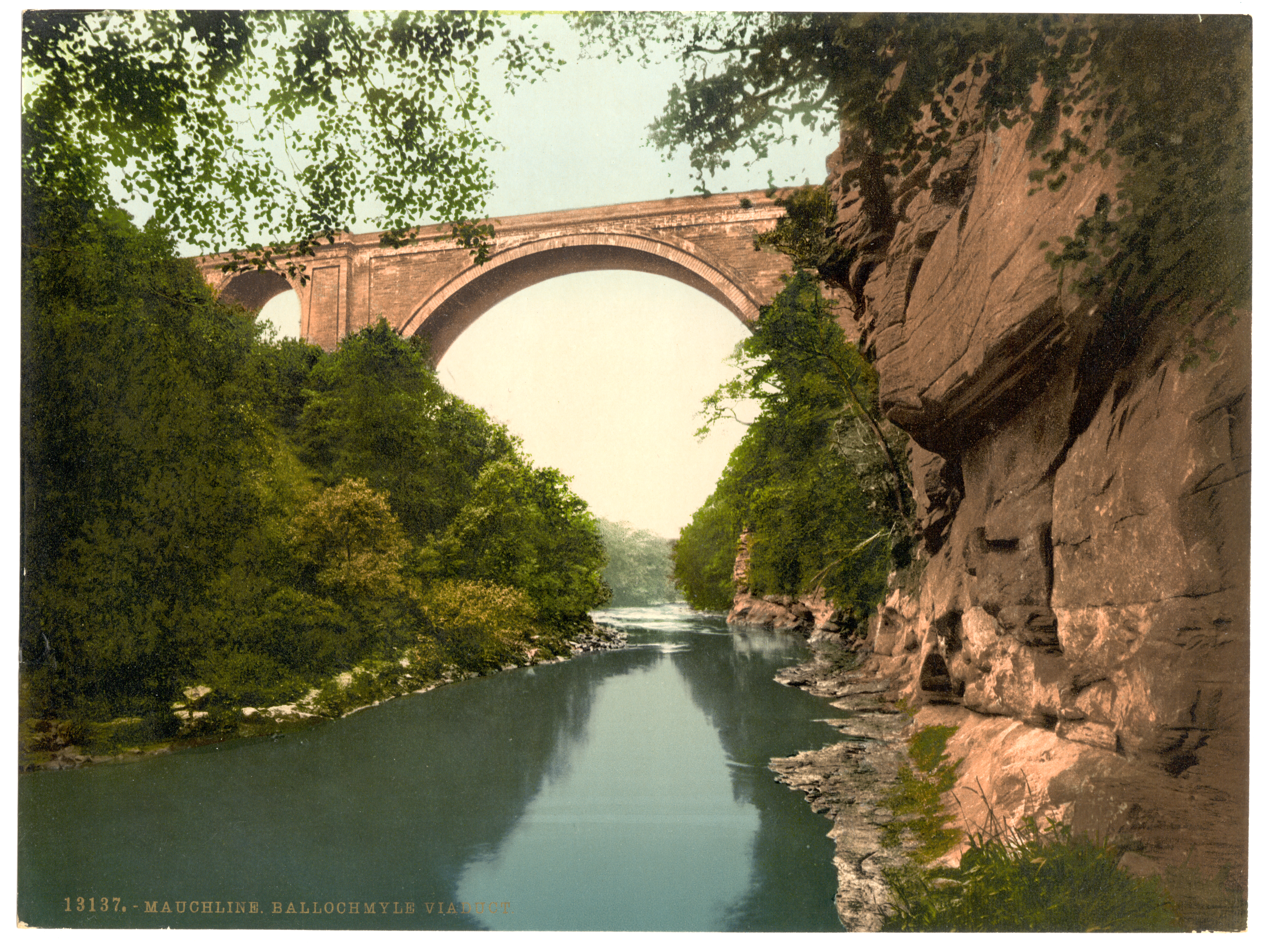
View of the viaduct from the River Ayr, circa 1900

The Ballochmyle Viaduct is the tallest extant railway viaduct in Britain. It is 169 feet (52 m) high, and carries the railway over the River Ayr near Mauchline and Catrine in East Ayrshire, Scotland. It carries the former Glasgow and South Western Railway line between Glasgow and Carlisle.

Designed by John Miller, the viaduct was built in the 1840s for the Glasgow, Paisley, Kilmarnock and Ayr Railway Company. Work commenced on its construction during March 1846; it was built under contract by Ross & Mitchell and William McCandlish was the resident engineer. It is built of local red sandstone and stronger stone sourced from Dundee was used for the arch rings. On completion on 2 March 1848, the viaduct had the largest masonry arch in the world and remains amongst the largest ever to be constructed.

The viaduct was listed in April 1971 and became a Category A listed structure in January 1989. It was designated a "Historic Civil Engineering Landmark" by the Institution of Civil Engineers (ICE) in 2014. Network Rail undertook strengthening work on the viaduct in the 2010s. The Ballochmyle Viaduct is used for passenger and freight traffic through to the present day.

== History ==
The Ballochmyle Viaduct was designed by John Miller for the Glasgow, Paisley, Kilmarnock and Ayr Railway during the mid 1840s. The line was the northern part of the railway from Glasgow to Carlisle via Kilmarnock. The viaduct was required to cross the River Ayr. The resident engineer was William McCandlish and the contractors were Ross & Mitchell.

During March 1846, construction of the stone viaduct began. The viaduct incorporated a massive arch spanning the River Ayr. To build the arch, complex timber centring for temporary support was constructed over the river. The centring was considered to be noteworthy in its own right.

The viaduct was completed on 2 March 1848 but the line was not completed until 9 August 1850. At the time of its construction, the viaduct had the largest masonry arch in the world; 150 years later, it was amongst the biggest masonry arches to have ever been built. The viaduct carries double track railway across the river between Mauchline and Catrine; and tens of thousands of trains have crossed over it during its lifetime.

The viaduct has been in continuous use to the present day; in 2014, it was in a good condition despite more than 160 years of service. During the early 2010s Network Rail upgraded the viaduct to strengthen it for heavy freight trains, particularly coal traffic. The work, undertaken by contractor Carillion, was done without significant alteration to its external appearance.

Ballochmyle Viaduct was designated a listed structure during April 1971 and became a Category A listed structure in January 1989. It features in the 1996 film Mission: Impossible. During 2014, the viaduct was designated a National Historic Civil Engineering Landmark by the Institution of Civil Engineers (ICE) and a plaque was installed. The viaduct is also listed amongst those sites promoted by the East Ayrshire Council as being a local historical site.

== Design ==
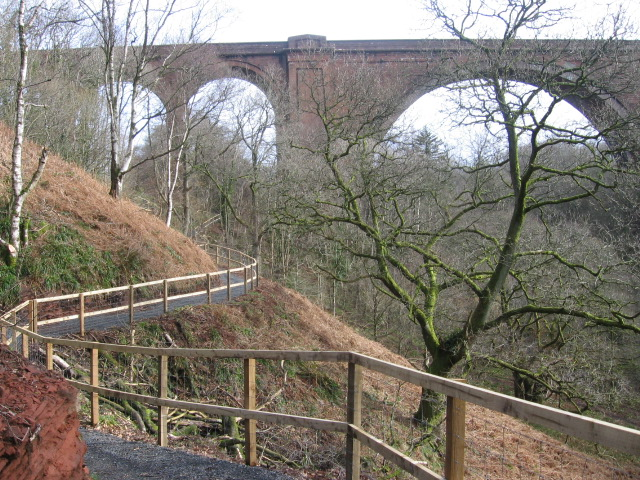
View of the Ballochmyle Viaduct from the side of the Ayr Valley, 2007

Ballochmyle Viaduct carries a double-track railway over the River Ayr. It has seven spans, three 50 feet (15 m) spans at either side of the central 181 feet (55 m) span. The main arch crosses the River Ayr at 164 feet (50 m) at its highest point. All the arches are semi-circular, built around an arch ring comprising hard stone quarried near Dundee and local red sandstone was used for the rest of the structure. While largely plain, the arches have some decorative ornamentation including raised panels on the spandrels, and the dressed stone arch rings. These details can be viewed from the riverside path that passes underneath the central arch.

== Former Pedens Cave at Ballochmyle ==
In 2023, the East Kilbride-based topographical historian, Chris Ladds, identified rock-hewn steps and graffiti panels beside the northern abutments as representing the remnnants of a former Romantic era landscape attraction of the Braes of Ballochmyle - the 'Pedens Cave' alluded to in the New Statistical Account and some other sources. One of many Pedens Caves or Coves in the area, it was shown that this example had been overlooked in recent history, but was specifically recorded in several documents which described its destruction to create the footings of the viaduct's northern abutment.

== See also ==
- List of Category A listed buildings in East Ayrshire
- List of listed buildings in Mauchline, East Ayrshire
- List of longest masonry arch bridge spans
- List of railway bridges and viaducts in the United Kingdom
