= Shrew (stock character) =

Stock character; woman given to violent, scolding, particularly nagging treatment

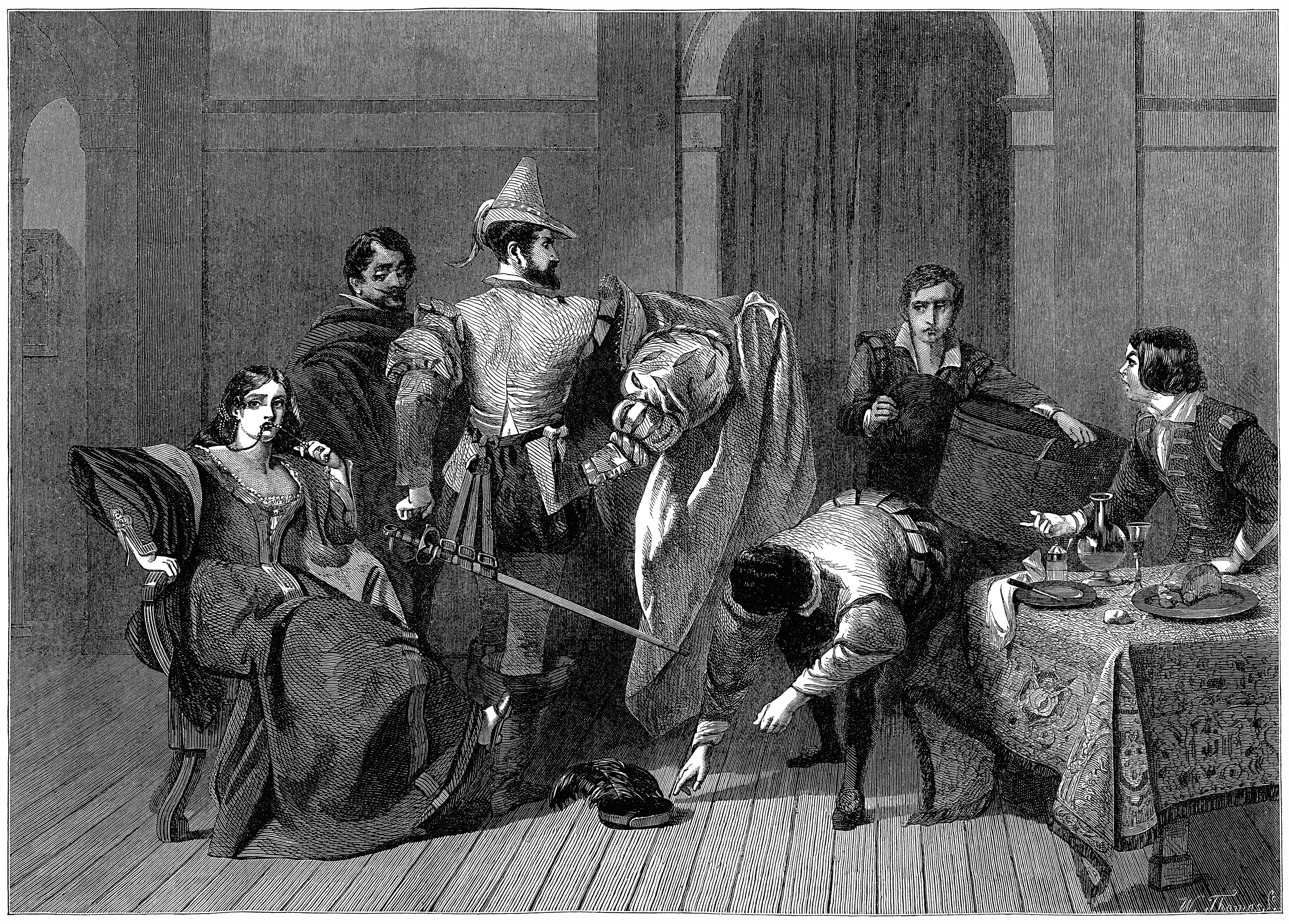
The Taming of the Shrew, by C. R. Leslie

The shrew – an unpleasant, ill-tempered woman characterised by scolding, nagging, and aggression – is a comedic stock character in literature and folklore, both Western and Eastern. The theme is illustrated in Shakespeare's play The Taming of the Shrew.

As a reference to actual women, rather than the stock character, the shrew is considered old-fashioned, and the synonym scold (as a noun) is archaic. The term shrew is still used to describe the stock character in fiction and folk storytelling. None of these terms are usually applied to males in Modern English.

This stereotype or cliché was common in early- to mid-20th-century films, and retains some present-day currency, often shifted somewhat toward the virtues of the stock female character of the heroic virago.

Folklorist Jan Harold Brunvand collected over 400 literary and oral versions of shrew stories in 30 cultural groups in Europe in the middle 20th century.

== In early modern law ==
Being a "common scold" was once a petty criminal offense in the early-modern law of England and Wales and of colonial New England, during the 16th through 18th centuries. Punishments varied by region, but were usually meant to humiliate the guilty party. They included the imposition of the ducking stool, pillory, jougs, a shrew's fiddle, or a scold's bridle. Scold or shrew was a term which could be applied with different degrees of reprobation, and one early modern proverb allowed that "a shrew profitable may serve a man reasonably".

== The shrew-taming plot ==
A common central theme of such literature and folktales is the often forceful "taming" of shrewish wives by their husbands. Arising in folklore, in which community story-telling can have functions of moral censorship or suasion, it has served to affirm traditional values and moral authority regarding polarised gender roles, and to address social unease about female behavior in marriage.

This basic plot structure typically involves a series of recurring motifs: A man, often young and penniless, marries a woman with shrewish or other negative qualities (laziness, etc.), for her dowry or other reasons unrelated to love, despite another trying to talk him out of it. She may have a more docile but unavailable younger sister, for contrast, and/or an even more shrewish mother.

The taming process begins immediately after the marriage, and does not last long, sometimes only the wedding night itself. It involves denial of intimacy by the husband to the bride, and often also has several other features, including coercion (e.g., by violence, sleep deprivation, and/or starvation) to induce submission, and psychological manipulation (e.g. animal abuse, usually targeting cats, in front of the wife). Capitulation by the "shrew" happens suddenly, she transforms into a "model" wife, and the couple lives happily ever after.

A variant suggests that the taming must be done early: The one who had tried to talk the young man out of the marriage (often the bride's own father) sees that it worked on the bride, and tries it on his own wife unsuccessfully because she already knows he is meek. Many of these elements, including denial of food (through trickery) and psychological manipulation (without animal abuse), were reused by William Shakespeare in his play The Taming of the Shrew, which closes with the reformed shrew giving a monologue on why wives should always obey their husbands.

This overall plot structure was retained in various works of silent-era and post-Second World War cinema.

Elements of the shrew-taming plot are still used today, though with less patriarchal messages since the rise of feminism. The Taming of the Shrew has itself led to various modern, loose adaptations to current societal views in differing Western and Eastern industrialized societies, while retaining the stock character and the underlying theme of consequences of female disagreeableness, but often giving the "shrew" much more agency, and portraying some "shrewish" traits in a positive light, blending with the stock character of the virago.

Some of these include: Frivolous Wife, a 2008 South Korean film, in which the "shrew" attempts to change herself to become better accepted by her inlaws; ShakespeaRe-Told: The Taming of the Shrew, a 2005 British film, in which a politician seeks to reform her public relations image as an abrasive woman by getting married, but finds this challenging; Deliver Us from Eva, a 2003 American romantic comedy film, in which the boyfriends of three young sisters whose relationships are being micro-managed by an elder, troublesome fourth sister, hire a pickup artist to seduce this "shrew" and get them out of their lives, but he falls in love with her despite her ways not changing permanently.

In 10 Things I Hate About You, a 1999 American teen romantic comedy, in which high school students play matchmaker with a "shrew" and her cantankerous male counterpart, while themes of family reconciliation and teen sex-related psychological angst are explored. It was remade as a 2009 TV series, in which the "shrew" character is redeveloped into a serious-attitude activist. In an uncommon gender-role reversal, the 1980 Italian film The Taming of the Scoundrel features a macho and grumpy but successful male farmer, known for antisocially driving women away, who is eventually won over by an earnest young lady, aided by the farmer's housekeeper who has long been trying to find a bride for the loner.

== Usage and etymology ==
In Elizabethan England, shrew was widely used to refer to women and wives who did not fit into the social role that was expected of them. In William Shakespeare's The Taming of the Shrew, Katherina "has a scolding, shrewish tongue," thus prompting Petruchio to try to tame her.

More modern, figurative labels include battle-axe and dragon lady; more literary alternatives (all deriving from mythological names) are termagant, harpy, and fury.

Shrew derives from Middle English shrewe for 'evil or scolding person', used since at least the 11th century, in turn from Old English scrēawa or scrǣwa, 'shrew' (animal); cognates in other Germanic languages have divergent meanings, including 'fox', 'dwarf', 'old man', and 'devil'. The modern spelling dates to the 14th century. Connections between the stock character and animal can be seen in the fact that shrews are highly territorial with each other and only come together during mating. They are also carnivores that can eat almost constantly, attacking all sorts of other small creatures. A few species, the Eurasian Water Shrew in particular, are one of the very few mammals to have a venomous bite, although this is not harmful to humans. These traits are also reflected in the fact that historically, the animals called shrews were superstitiously feared, leading to the now-obsolete word beshrew, 'to curse or invoke evil upon'.

Beginning in the mid-13th century, following on the belief that the animals could exert a wicked influence on humans exposed to them, the term was applied metaphorically to a person of either sex thought to have a similar disposition, but by the 14th century, it was applied to women alone. This also led to a now obsolete verb usage, to shrew meaning 'to scold'.

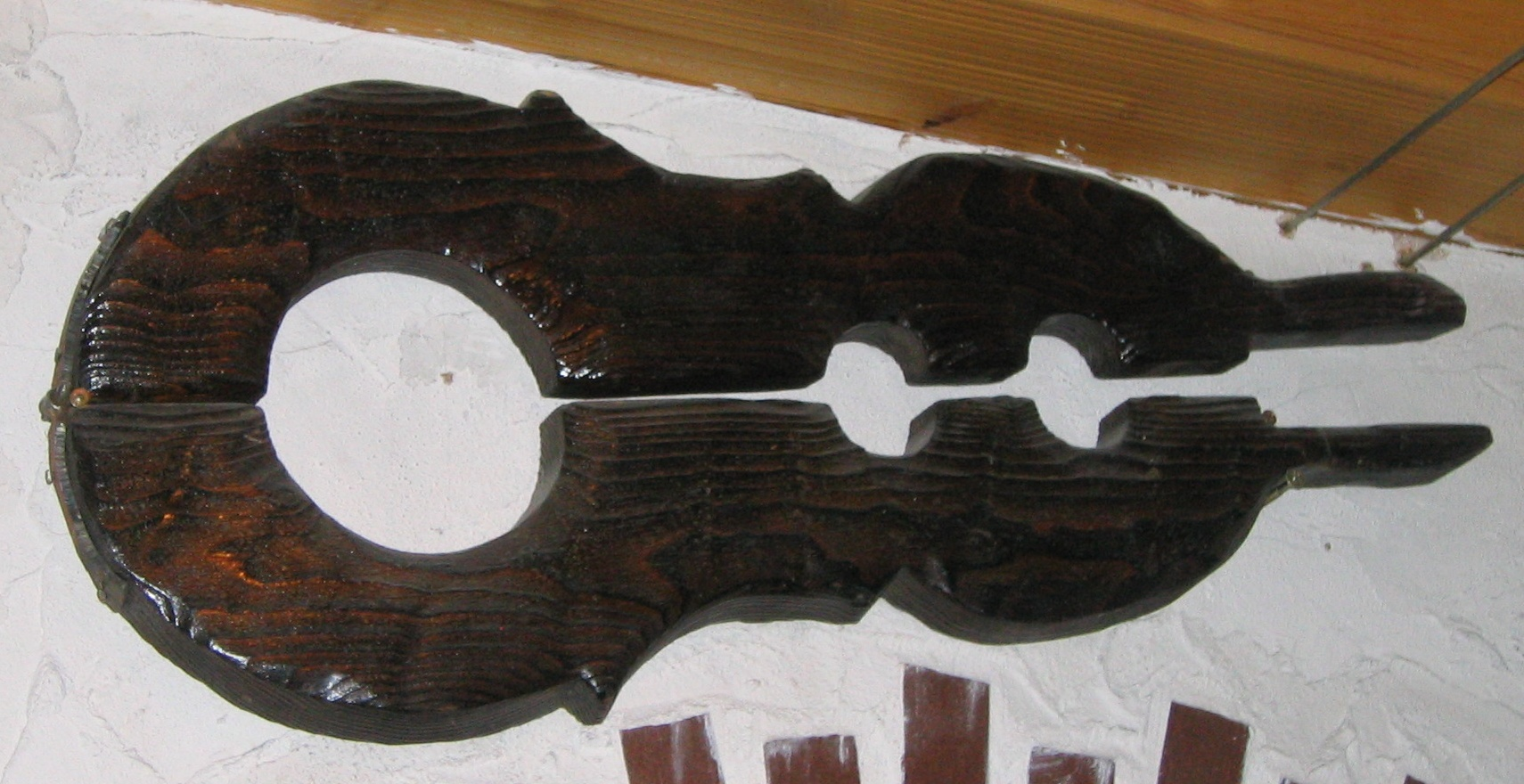
A shrew's fiddle, was used as mobile stock for women in Austria and Germany during the Middle Ages. The large hole was for the neck with the smaller holes being for the wrists.

By the middle 16th century, the opposing extremes of wifely personality traits were contrasted as "shrew" vs. "sheep". The earliest-known formal definition of shrew as applied to people is Samuel Johnson's, in the 1755 A Dictionary of the English Language: "peevish, malignant, clamorous, spiteful, vexatious, turbulent woman". He described the use of the word in reference to males as "ancient", but also quoted Shakespeare using it to satirise a man by likening him to the shrewish woman central to his play: "By this reckoning, he is more shrew than she." (Cf. modern use toward men of other female-targeted slurs like bitch.)

As a synonym for the shrew in literature and theatre, the word termagant derives from the name Termagant, an invented, mock-Muslim, male deity used in medieval mystery plays, characterised as violent and overbearing. Termagant features in many period works of the 11th through 15th centuries, from The Song of Roland to Chaucer's Canterbury Tales (in "The Tale of Sir Thopas").

The name was genericised into a term referring to male characters with ranting, bullying personalities. In the 16th century, Shakespeare used the word in this generic, masculine sense in Henry IV, Part I (as an adjective), and in its original proper name sense in Hamlet. Such characters usually wore long gowns that gave them a feminine appearance in an era when female characters were played by men or boys, and were dressed similarly. This led the gradual shift in meaning, to refer exclusively to an overbearing, turbulent, quarrelsome, even brawling woman, which was a well-established usage by the late 17th century. Female characters actually named Termagant appear in works including Thomas Shadwell's play The Squire of Alsatia (1688), and Arthur Murphy's play The Upholsterer (1758), while Washington Irving's "Rip Van Winkle" (1819) uses the word generically, to refer to the main character's wife.

=== Other similar terms ===
The similar term harridan, widely also considered a synonym of shrew, originated as a late-17th-century slang term for 'aging prostitute' (probably from 16th-century French haridelle, 'old horse', in metaphor a 'gaunt, ill-favoured woman'). It has taken on the meaning of scolding, nagging, bossy, belligerent woman, especially an older one, and is not tied to literary context.

Another word with essentially the same meaning, and applying only to women since around 1300, is the noun scold (later replaced with scolder, as scold became a verb toward the late 14th century). It dates more gender-neutrally to Middle English, ca. 1150–1200, as scold or scald (unrelated to the 'burn' sense, from Old French), and probably derives from Old Norse skáld, 'a skald', i.e. poet. The skalds, like the bards, were feared for their panegyric satire, and this may explain the connection to verbal abusiveness.

Johnson's 18th-century definition was: "A clamourous, rude, mean, low, foul-mouthed woman", suggesting a level of vulgarity and a class distinction from the more generalised shrew, but this nuance has been lost. In Johnson's time, the word formed part of a legal term, common scold which referred to rude and brawling women. To the extent the noun form retains any currency, some dictionaries observe that it can (unusually) be applied to males, a recent re-development. Scold, in its heyday, was not particularly limited to literary or theatrical contexts.

== See also ==
- Battle-axe (woman)
- Fishwife
- Karen (slang)
- Megaera
- Nagging
- Tsundere
- Witchcraft
- Wokescold
