= Stool of repentance (game) =

Guessing game

Stool of repentance (also called "Accusations") is a parlour game for children and adults. The players sit in a circle around a stool.

One of the group (the "victim") leaves the room, and the rest say or write all sorts of things about them. For instance, one will say they are handsome, another that they are clever, or stupid, or vain. The "victim" is called back to sit on the stool, and one of the players begins to tell them the different charges that were made against them. "Someone said you were vain; can you guess who?" If the victim guesses correctly, they return to the circle, and the person who made the accusation takes the stool as the new "victim". If, however, the "victim" is unable to guess correctly, they must leave the room again and fresh charges are made against them. The game almost certainly takes its name from the old Scottish church custom of the same name.
