= Nagging =

Repetitious behaviour in the form of pestering

Nagging, in interpersonal communication, is repetitious behaviour in the form of pestering, hectoring, harassing, or otherwise continuously urging an individual to complete previously discussed requests or act on advice. The word is probably borrowed from North Germanic, compare Swedish nagga 'to gnaw'.

In a Wall Street Journal article, reporter Elizabeth Bernstein defined nagging as "the interaction in which one person repeatedly makes a request, the other person repeatedly ignores it and both become increasingly annoyed". Thus, nagging is a form of persistent persuasion that is more repetitive than aggressive and it is an interaction to which each party contributes.

Nagging is a very common form of persuasion used in all aspects of life including domestic and professional. It is also a common practice in order to avoid more aggressive persuasive moves like threats.

== Dynamics ==
Kari P. Soule describes nagging as an "interpersonal ritual" but states that the term "seldom appears in interpersonal communication or conflict textbooks. It appears that 'nagging' is commonly used in everyday conversation but it rarely makes it to academic print".

Nagging as a form of interpersonal communication is considered to be a repetitious form of persuasion that can be employed as an alternative to resorting to more aggressive tactics in order to gain compliance. Martin Kozloff, Ph.D., Professor of Education at the University of North Carolina at Wilmington, identifies four main steps of nagging:

1. The nagger gives the signal to perform or stop performing a task or behaviour.
2. The person being nagged does not comply to the request from the nagger.
3. In response, the nagger repeats his request or signal in a further effort to gain compliance.
4. The person being nagged again responds with non-compliance.

Kozloff argues that this interaction cycle continues until either the one who is being nagged complies to the nagger's request or the nagger gives up the attempt to persuade. Kozloff identifies other important aspects of nagging; for instance, non-compliance is necessary for the persuader to be persistent. In addition, the persuader will often change the initial requests words and paralinguistic cues as a strategic tactic to entice the target into complying with the request.

Regarding compliance, behavioural noncompliance describes the situation that occurs when the person being nagged remains silent or agrees to complete the request, but later does not follow through. This strategy is employed to end the confrontation or interaction quickly without conflict, which is why it is common among spouses or partners. As the nagging interaction that starts out in a calm and polite manner continues and the persuader becomes more repetitive, the interaction is more likely to become aggressive in nature. Verbal noncompliance, on the other hand, describes the situation that occurs when the target tells the persuader through words that he will not comply, and is a more direct tactic than behavioural noncompliance. An example of verbal noncompliance could be a simple no, or I am too busy right now, or an even more elaborate response. This tactic does end the nagging interaction more rapidly; however, it can cause a more aggressive response from the persuader, who may escalate persistent persuasion into a threat or another aggressive form of persuasion.

Psychotherapists such as Edward S. Dean, M.D. have reported that individuals who nag are often "weak, insecure, and fearful ... their nagging disguises a basic feeling of weakness and provides an illusion of power and superiority". Nagging is sometimes used by spouses of alcoholics as one of several "drinking control efforts", but it is often unproductive. Psychologically, nagging can act to reinforce behavior. A study by the University of Florida found the main factors that lead a person to nag are differences in "gender, social distance, and social status and power".

=== Gender ===
Kari P. Soule found an equal number of men and women nag; however, studies have shown that women are more likely to nag both men and women, while men are more likely to nag only men.

=== Marital ===
Nagging by spouses is a common marital complaint. Nagging can be found between both male and female spouses. According to The Wall Street Journal, "It is possible for husbands to nag, and wives to resent them for nagging. But women are more likely to nag, experts say, largely because they are conditioned to feel more responsible for managing home and family life. And they tend to be more sensitive to early signs of problems in a relationship."

An 1897 article in Good Housekeeping magazine stated that at that time, topics differed by gender; husbands' nagging usually involved finding "fault with their dinner, with the household bills [and] with the children", along with "carry[ing] home the worries of business."

=== Parental and child ===
A study done at Washington State University and published in 1959 described parental nagging of children as being a "symptom of the rejection of the child" in circumstances when children's requirements regarding "time and energy" are perceived to interfere with the mother's "individual needs and aspirations." According to James U. McNeal, there are seven classifications of juvenile nagging, wherein children nag their parents to obtain something they desire.

== History ==
During the Middle Ages, a scold's bridle, also called a brank, was an instrument of punishment used primarily on women. The device was an iron muzzle in an iron framework that enclosed the head. A bridle-bit (or curb-plate), about 2 inches long and 1 inch broad, projected into the mouth and pressed down on top of the tongue. The curb-plate was frequently studded with spikes, so that if the offender moved her tongue, it inflicted pain and lacerated the tongue which made speaking impossible. Wives who were seen as witches, shrews and scolds, were forced to wear a brank which was locked onto their head.

== See also ==
- Hypercriticism
- Monomania
