= Buttock mail =

Colloquial term for a Scottish Poor Law tax

Buttock mail or buttock hire was the colloquial term for a Scottish Poor Law tax which was introduced in 1595. Enforced by the ecclesiastical courts who had responsibility for the moral behaviour of the laity, buttock mail was levied as a fine for sexual intercourse out of wedlock.

== Etymology ==
In the 17th century, and perhaps earlier when the law that became known as buttock mail was passed, buttock was a colloquial term for a prostitute. The term mail is an old Scots word meaning a monetary tribute or payment (a loanword from Scottish Gaelic màl), from the same root as the word blackmail. Thus, the term buttock mail literally means a monetary payment related to prostitution, referring to its being a fine for fornication, or sex outside of marriage.

== History ==
Ecclesiastical courts had existed since the Norman invasion. While secular courts were tasked with enforcing secular laws, the responsibility of the ecclesiastical courts was to enforce religious and moral laws. This included discipline of the clergy, enforcement of probate and wills, as well as enforcement of laws that kept the laity within moral bounds. These ecclesiastical courts were very powerful until the late 17th century, when the Glorious Revolution removed much of their power. The remaining jurisdiction of the ecclesiastical courts was removed in the 19th century.

Fornication was against the law, and punishments were enforced by these ecclesiastical courts. The normal punishment was a public confession through use of the Stool of Repentance, but payment of buttock mail commuted this sentence, allowing the convicted fornicator to avoid public humiliation. The term buttock mail was in use from the 16th until the 19th century.
