= Stool of repentance =

Torture device

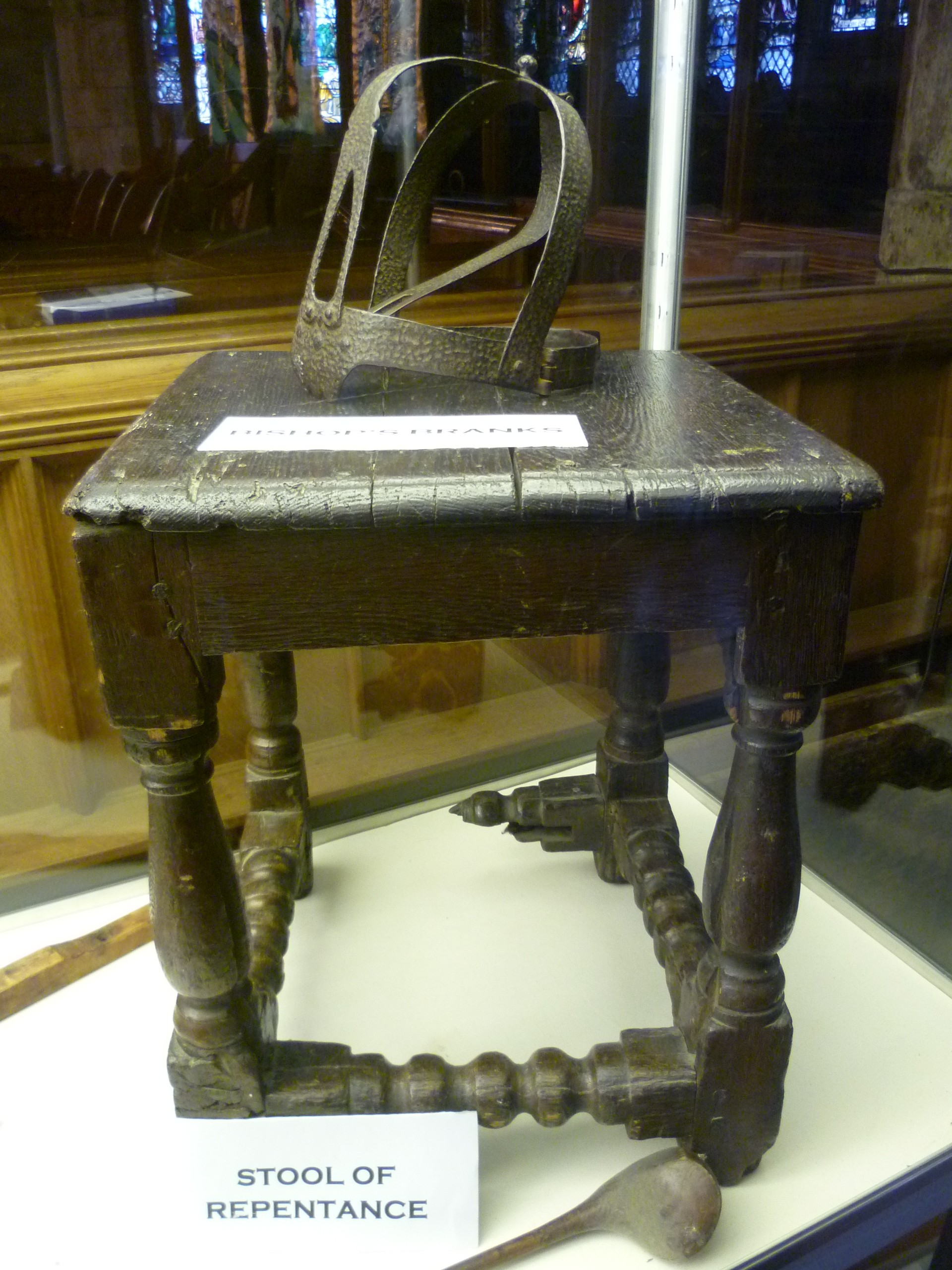
Stool of repentance and branks, Holy Trinity Church, St. Andrews

The stool of repentance (Scottish Gaelic: furm an aithreachais, stòl an aithreachais), in the Presbyterian polity, mostly in Scotland, was an elevated seat in a church used for the public penance of persons who had offended against the morality of the time, often through fornication and adultery. At the end of the service the offender usually had to stand on the stool to receive the rebuke of the minister. It was in use until the early 19th century.

The humiliation of sitting on the stool, being punished and publicly repenting sins drove some victims to suicide. In the case of pregnant women of such parishes who had not conceived with their husbands, they would often elaborately conceal their pregnancy or attempt infanticide rather than face the congregation in the Kirk Session.

An alternative to, or commutation of, the stool of repentance was the payment of buttock mail.

== See also ==
- Cuttie-stool
- Jougs
- Scold's bridle
- Shrew's fiddle
