= Escrava Anastacia =

Brazilian enslaved woman and folk saint

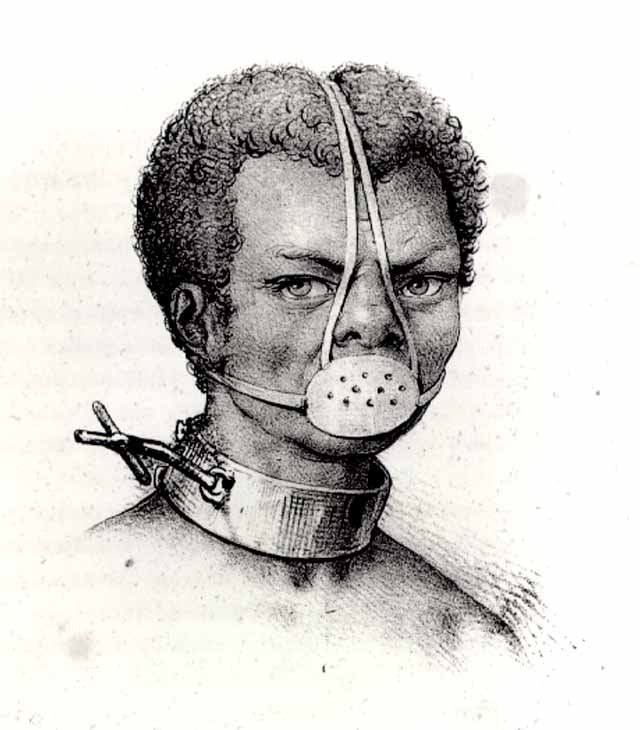
- Born: 05 May 1740?
- Venerated in: Folk Catholicism, Brazilian Catholic Church, Umbanda and Kardecismo
- Attributes: African woman, blue eyes, facemask

Escrava Anastácia (12 May 1740 – unknown) is a popular folk saint venerated in Brazil. An enslaved woman of African descent, Anastácia is depicted as possessing incredible beauty, having piercing blue eyes and wearing a punitive iron facemask. Although not officially recognized by the Catholic Church, Anastácia is an important figure in popular Catholic devotion throughout Brazil, where her feast day is celebrated on May 12. She is also venerated by members of the Umbanda and Kardecist traditions. She has been portrayed in Brazil in books, radio programs, and a highly successful television miniseries bearing her name.

== Biography ==
Without an official history, accounts of Anastácia's life vary, though all agree that she was enslaved. Some place her birth in Brazil, where it is stipulated that Anastácia was born to an enslaved West African woman whom the plantation owner raped, resulting in the first black child with blue eyes. The enslaver had the baby sent away, to hide the evidence of his "infidelity" from his wife.

Other traditions describe Anastácia as herself African-born, a royal princess who was enslaved and shipped to Brazil. According to Carlos de Lima, a Brazilian historian, the enslaved princess became a housekeeper on a sugar cane plantation.

In all versions, the enslavers treat Anastácia cruelly. She stoically bears these horrors and treats all people with love. Often she is blessed with tremendous healing powers and performs other miracles. Eventually, she is punished by her owners by being forced to wear a muzzle-like mask, which prevents her from speaking, and a heavy iron collar. The reasons given for this punishment vary: some stories report her aiding in the escape of other enslaved people; in others, she resisted rape by the plantation master; and yet another places the blame on a plantation mistress jealous of Anastácia's beauty.

After a prolonged period of suffering, all the while performing more miracles of healing and peace, Anastácia dies of tetanus from the collar. It is often claimed that she healed the son of the plantation owners, and forgave their cruelty as she died.

== History of veneration ==
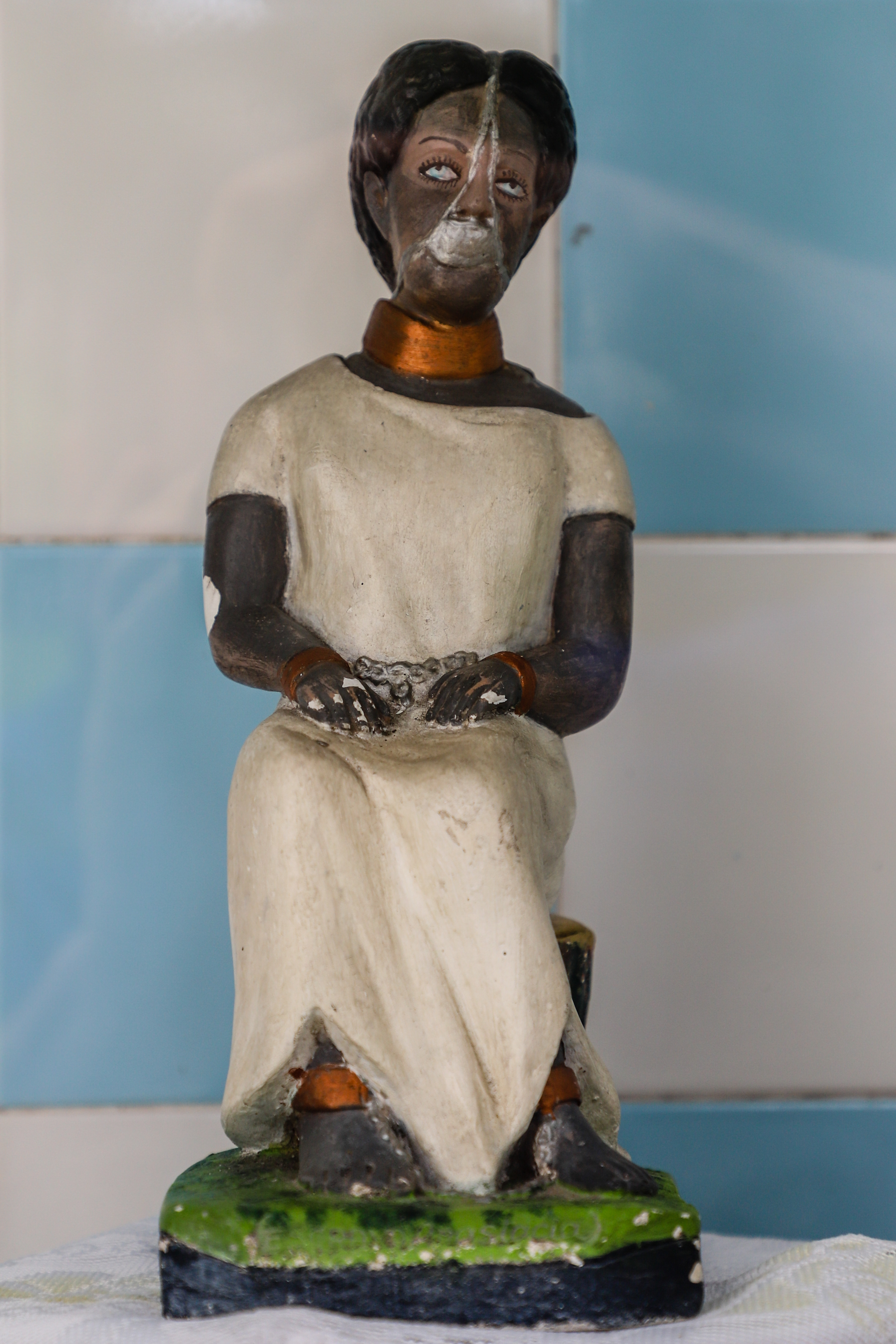
Statue of the Escrava Anastácia located at Church of Our Lady of the Rosary in Salvador, Brazil. This depiction of Anastácia features her blue eyes, as well as an iron torture device on her face and iron collar around her neck. This statuette is most likely used as an arena of devotion to Anastácia, as many gifts are given to statues/images of the saint

While there are reports of black Brazilians venerating an image of a slave woman wearing a mask and collar throughout the late 19th and early 20th century, wide-scale veneration of the saint was sparked in 1968. The curators of the Museum of the Negro, located in the annex of the Church of Our Lady of the Rosary of Black Men and Saint Benedict in Rio de Janeiro, erected an exhibition to honor the 80th anniversary of Lei Áurea, which abolished slavery in Brazil. Among the displays was an engraving of a female slave wearing a punishment mask. The image soon became the object of popular devotion, and members of the Brotherhood of Black Men began collecting Anastácia stories in the early 1970s.

In the 1980s, the cult of Anastácia expanded from her mainly black and impoverished following to include many progressive, middle-class whites. In 1984, an effort funded by the oil company Petrobras to officially canonize Anastácia brought her considerable attention. Seen as a symbol of racial harmony, her popularity expanded rapidly, especially among nurses, black women, and prisoners. There were radio dramatizations of her life; investigative reports and a popular miniseries were produced for television. She was also integrated into the Umbanda faith as one of the pretos velhos ("old black slaves").

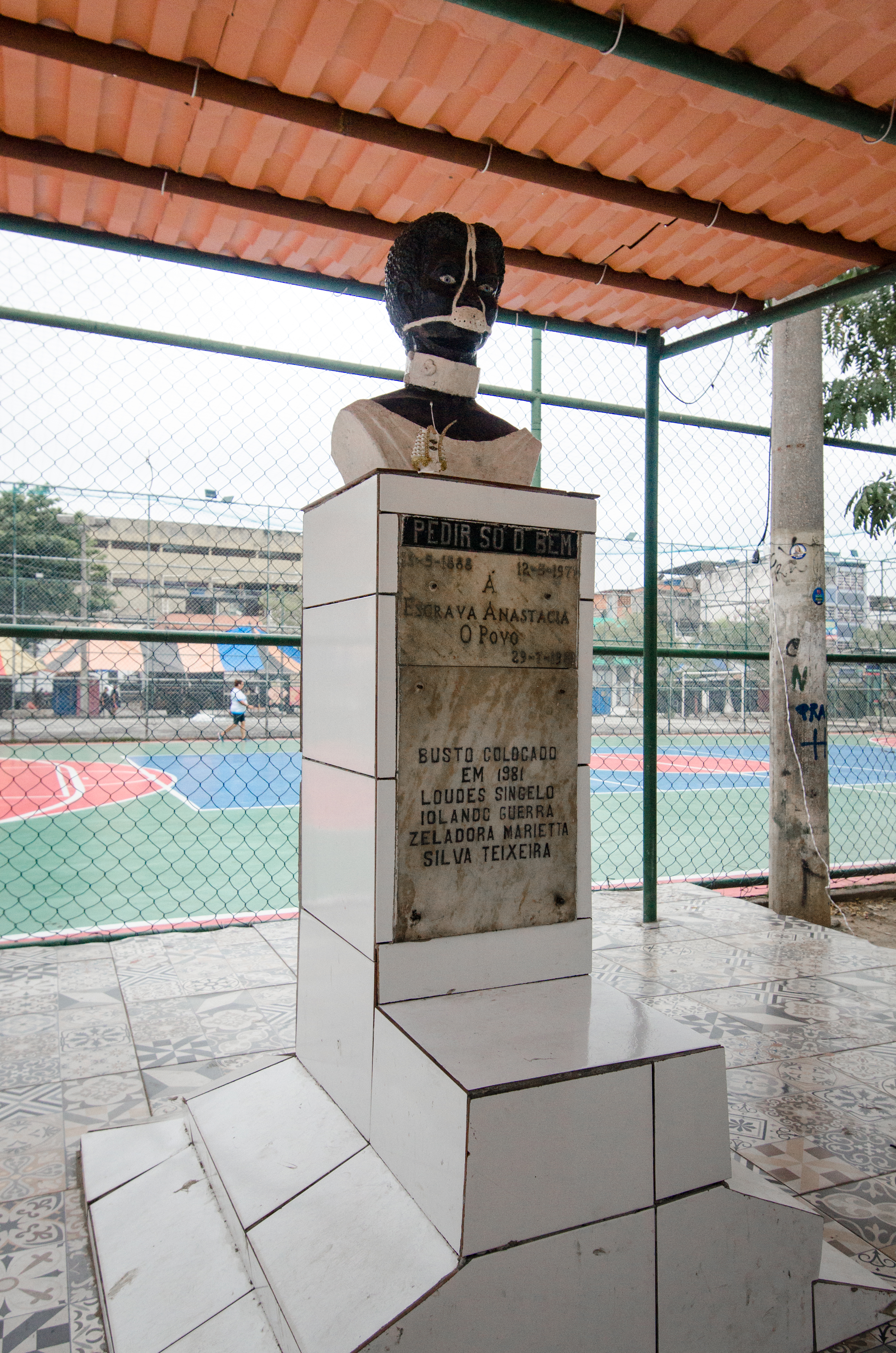
Monument of Anastácia erected 1981 in Rio de Janeiro portraying her with blue eyes and being "to Anastácia from the people." The plaque also prompts visitors to "only ask [Anastácia] for good [things]."

== Present day ==
Devotion to Anastácia, as with other saints, is a deeply personal experience amongst those who venerate her. The primary arena of this devotion is the use of small images and sacramentals—prayer cards, medallions, statuettes, candles, and so on—through which the devotee asks Anastácia to intercede on his or her behalf. Many also say prayers to Anastácia in times of difficulty or crisis. Often, devotees respond to intercessions by pilgrimage to one of several popular shrines. Here small offerings like flowers, jewelry, prayer cards, and medallions are offered to the image of the saint.

=== Controversies ===
In May 2020, during a demonstration in Humboldt County, California protesting social distancing and mask mandates, one protester held up a sign showing a picture of Anastácia which read, "Muzzles are for dogs and slaves. I am a human being." The woman holding the sign claimed to not know the significance of the image, while historians and others identified it as Anastácia. Many took offense as the sign seemingly both condoned slavery and compared a then-2-month-old lockdown to a centuries-old system of oppression.

Cultural legacy

Anastácia has been used by multiple social movements to symbolize many different causes, primarily those concerned with liberation and rebellion. Her image was used in 1988 in a march against racism; it is used by millions of Brazilian women daily in the form of images and sacramentals to advocate for women's rights. Despite her existence being contested and her sainthood unofficial, Anastasia is popularly venerated as a symbol of inspiration and hope.

=== In popular culture ===
In 1990, a mini-series entitled "Escrava Anastácia" was produced for Brazilian television. Directed by Henrique Martins, written by Paulo César Coutinho and starring Ângela Correa, it portrayed Anastácia as a Nigerian princess captured by slavers. Anastácia is sold to a cruel master who falls in love with her and eventually tries to rape her. For refusing her master, Anastácia is punished by being forced to wear the metal mask. The image of Anastácia healing the son of her oppressors is an innovation developed for this program.

=== Free Anastácia: Monument to Anastácia's voice ===
Given the contemporary use of Anastácia's image by Black movements, representing the struggle of all under enslavement during colonial times and resistance against racism afterward, it is surprising that the suggestion of portraying her as a free woman was only applied in 2019 by the Brazilian artist Yhuri Cruz. Cruz is a political scientist and social journalist with personal ties to the Afro-Brazilian religion Umbanda, in which Anastácia is venerated.

His revision of French artist Jacques Arago's original image removes the torture device from Anastácia's mouth to reveal a "secret smile" (alluding to portraits of Sudanese saint Josephine Bakhita). Likewise, the collar is altered to give the impression of simple jewelry. In the absence of these traditional iconographic attributes, she is now flanked by white camellias, a Brazilian symbol of abolitionism and emancipation. The title at the bottom of the frame identifies her as Anastácia Livre ("Free Anastácia").

The image became popular in Rio de Janeiro in the form of holy cards, small devotional icons which typically depict a saint on the front and offer a prayer on the reverse. Cruz's new portrait was printed with his Monumento voz de Anastácia ("Monument to Anastácia's Voice") which recalls the violence and cruelty suffered in her original story, and praises her God-given freedom today in heaven.

== Sources ==
- BURDICK, John (1998): Blessed Anastácia: Women, Race, and Popular Christianity in Brazil, New York, Routledge. ISBN 0-415-91260-1
