= Blackmail =

Coercion based on threat of revealing information

Blackmail is a criminal act of coercion using a threat. As a criminal offense, blackmail is defined in various ways in common law jurisdictions. In the United States, blackmail is generally defined as a crime of information, involving a threat to do something that would cause a person to suffer embarrassment or financial loss. By contrast, in the Commonwealth its definition is wider: for example, the laws of England and Wales and Northern Ireland state that:

A person is guilty of blackmail if, with a view to gain for himself or another or with intent to cause loss to another, he makes any unwarranted demand with menaces...

In popular culture, 'blackmail' involves a threat to reveal or publicize either substantially true or false information about a person or people unless certain demands are met. It is often damaging information, and it may be revealed to family members or associates rather than to the general public.

Acts of blackmail can also involve using threats of physical, mental or emotional harm, or of criminal prosecution, against the victim or someone close to the victim. It is normally carried out for personal gain, most commonly of position, money, or property.

Blackmail may also be considered a form of extortion and may be covered in the same statutory provision as extortion. Although the two are generally synonymous, extortion is the taking of personal property by threat of future harm. Blackmail is the use of threat to prevent another from engaging in a lawful occupation and writing libelous letters or letters that provoke a breach of the peace, as well as use of intimidation for purposes of collecting an unpaid debt.

In many jurisdictions, blackmail is a statutory offense, often criminal, carrying punitive sanctions for convicted perpetrators. Blackmail is the name of a statutory offense in the United States, England and Wales, Hong Kong, and Australia, and has been used as a convenient way of referring to certain other offenses, but was not a term used in English law until 1968.

Blackmail was originally a term from the Scottish Borders meaning payments rendered in exchange for protection from thieves and marauders.

== Etymology ==
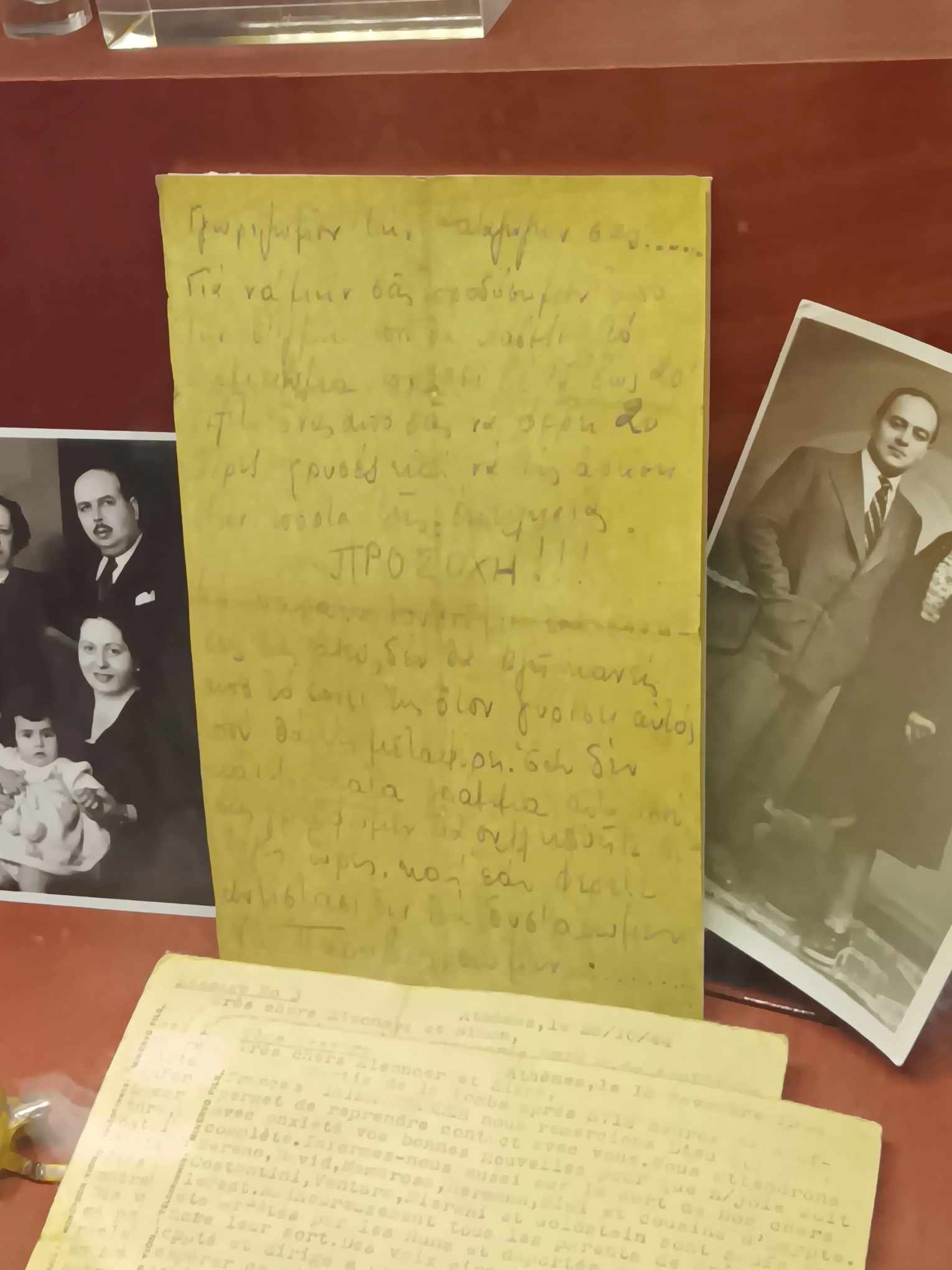
Blackmail note intended for the Jewish Capon-Minerbo family in hiding during the Axis occupation of Greece

The word blackmail is variously derived from the word for mailing (in modern terms, protection racket) paid by English and Scottish border dwellers to Border Reivers in return for immunity from raids and other harassment. The "mail" part of blackmail derives from Middle English male, "rent, tribute," from Old Norse mál (“agreement, speech, lawsuit”). This tribute was paid in goods or labour (reditus nigri, or "blackmail"); the opposite is blanche firmes or reditus albi, or "white rent" (denoting payment in silver). Alternatively, Mackay derives it from two Scottish Gaelic words blathaich pronounced (the th silent) bla-ich (to protect) and mal (tribute, payment), cf. buttock mail. He notes that the practice was common in the Scottish Highlands as well as the Borders. In the Irish language, the term cíos dubh, meaning "black rent", was used for similar exactions.

== Objections to criminalization ==
Some scholars have argued that blackmail should not be a crime. Objections to the criminalization of blackmail often rest on what legal scholars call "the paradox of blackmail": it takes two separate actions that, in many cases, people are legally and morally entitled to do, and criminalizes them if done together. One American legal scholar uses the example of a person who threatens to expose a criminal act unless he is paid money. The person has committed the crime of blackmail, even though he separately has the legal right both to threaten to expose a crime and to request money from a person.

== See also ==
- Emotional blackmail
- Graymail
- Loan shark
- Nuclear blackmail
- Pizzo (extortion)
- Sextortion
- Whitemail

In film

- Blackmail, (1920 film)
- Blackmail, (1929 film)
