= Slave iron bit =

Torture device

The iron bit, also referred to as a gag, was used by enslavers and overseers as a form of punishment on slaves in the Southern United States. The bit, sometimes depicted as the scold's bridle, uses similar mechanics to that of the common horse bit. The scolds bridle however, is almost always associated with its use on women in the early 17th century and there are very few accounts of the device as a method of torture against black slaves under that particular name. As opposed to the whip, the iron bit lacks the historic, social, and literary symbolic fame that would make information on the use of the iron bit as accessible. Its use throughout history has warranted some attention, though, mostly from literary texts. Even earlier, slave narratives and publications of newspapers and magazines from the 18th century on give evidence of this device being used to torture and punish slaves.

== Description ==
A website dedicated to documenting the history of slavery in the US quotes from slave trader turned abolitionist Thomas Branagan, who describes the iron bit through a "front and profile view of an African's head, with the mouth-piece and necklace, the hooks round which are placed to prevent an escapee when pursued in the woods, and to hinder them from laying down the head to procure rest." His essay entitled, "The Method of Procuring Slaves on the Coast of Africa; with an account of their sufferings on the voyage, and cruel treatment in the West Indies", describes the iron bit as having "a flat iron which goes into the mouth, and so effectually keeps down the tongue, that nothing can be swallowed, not even the saliva, a passage for which is made through holes in the mouth-plate."

== Historical evidence ==
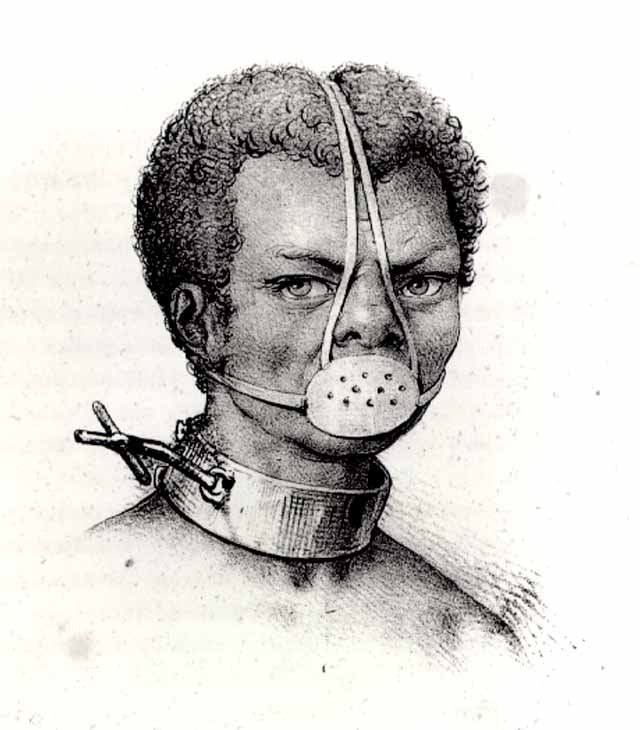
Escrava Anastacia ("Anastacia the slave"), a Brazilian folk saint, depicted wearing a punitive iron facemask.

Several articles and newspapers mention what appears to be the iron bit, but the name of the device varies from region to region where it is used. The mask, bit, and gag all refer to this torture device, but may differ in their specific manufacturing and disciplinary purposes. An 1848 article in The North Star states that "dealing in slaves has become a large business: establishments are made in several places in Maryland, at which they are sold like cattle. These places of deposit are strongly built and well supplied with iron thumb-screws and gags, and ornamented with cowskins and whips, often bloody".

A man wrote in an open letter to the editor of the Frederick Douglass Paper about an abolitionist who was demonstrating the actions of slave holders in the American South,

I recollect the horror that thrilled the hearts of the spectators, when Mr. Gurney one evening placed on his head an iron machine of torture, which inflicted great pain upon the slave, and an iron gag penetrated his mouth, confining his tongue and preventing articulation. He exhibited the whips also, and many other implements of cruelty adopted by the planters and their agents.

One newspaper advertisement from 1792 writes of a reward to be given for the capture of a runaway slave. The description of her is given that she is "5 feet three or 4 inches high, had on, when she went away, such clothing as negroes generally wear in the summer, and carried with her a white linen coat and jacket. She is a vile creature, and for her many crimes I punished her with an iron collar, but supposed she soon got that off."

Another article on the treatment of slaves by Delphine LaLaurie of Louisiana stated that "seven slaves were reportedly found in various parts of the residence and they were said to be in need of medical attention. Some of them were allegedly chained in uncomfortable positions and instruments of torture were said to have been found … [Specifically] iron collars with spikes or sharp edges."

== Literary accounts ==
Olaudah Equiano writes about the iron bit in his slave narrative, The Interesting Narrative of the Life of Olaudah Equiano, as "the iron muzzle". He writes that soon after arriving in North America he was taken to Virginia where he saw a black female slave “cooking the dinner, and the poor creature was cruelly loaded with various kinds of iron machines; she had one particularly on her head, which locked her mouth so fast that she could scarcely speak; and could not eat nor drink.”

Later he writes: “the iron muzzle, thumb screws, etc. are so well known as not to need a description, and were sometimes applied for the slightest faults" (Equiano 63 & 112).

Toni Morrison references the punishment in her novel Beloved.

== See also ==
- Scold's bridle
