= Slave collar =

Collar used to identify and discipline slaves

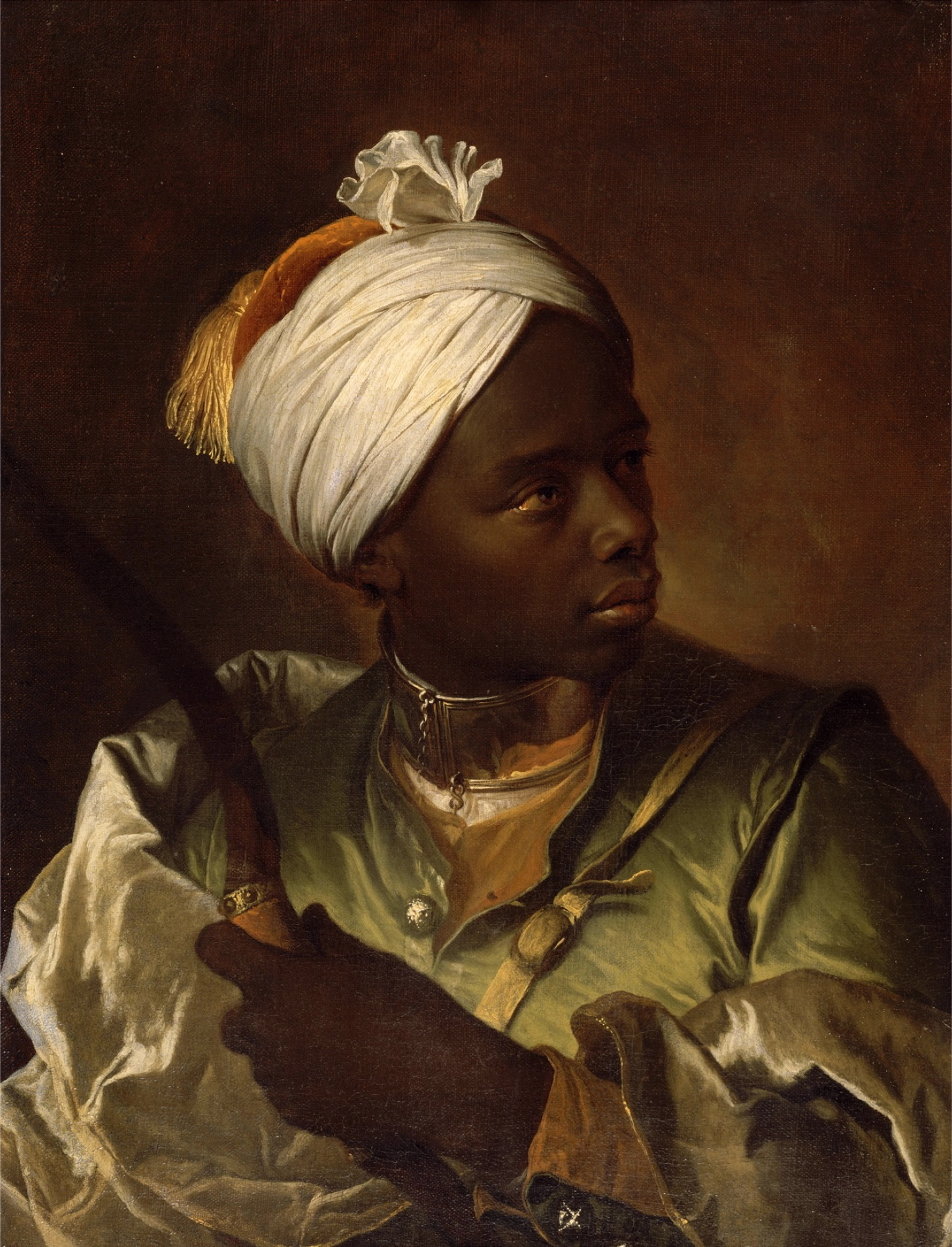
Black boy wearing a slave collar (ca.1697)

A slave collar is a collar used to identify and discipline slaves.

== History ==
Slave collars have been attested to in 4th and 5th-century ancient Rome, the antebellum United States, and in serf populations in Scotland.

Some surviving slave collars may have later been incorrectly identified as dog collars in museum collections.

== Gallery ==
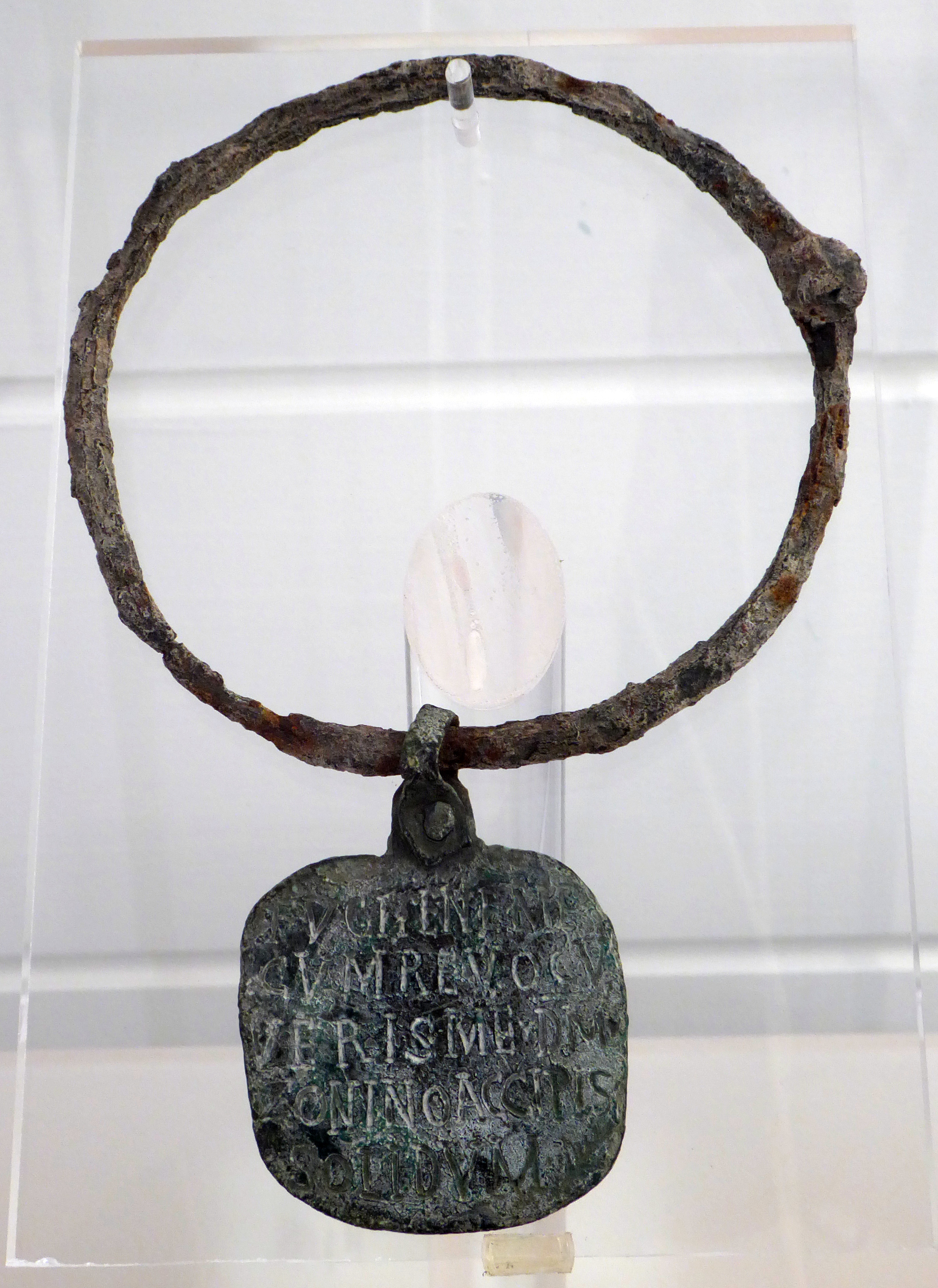
Zoninus collar, Roman slave collar dating to the 4th–5th century AD

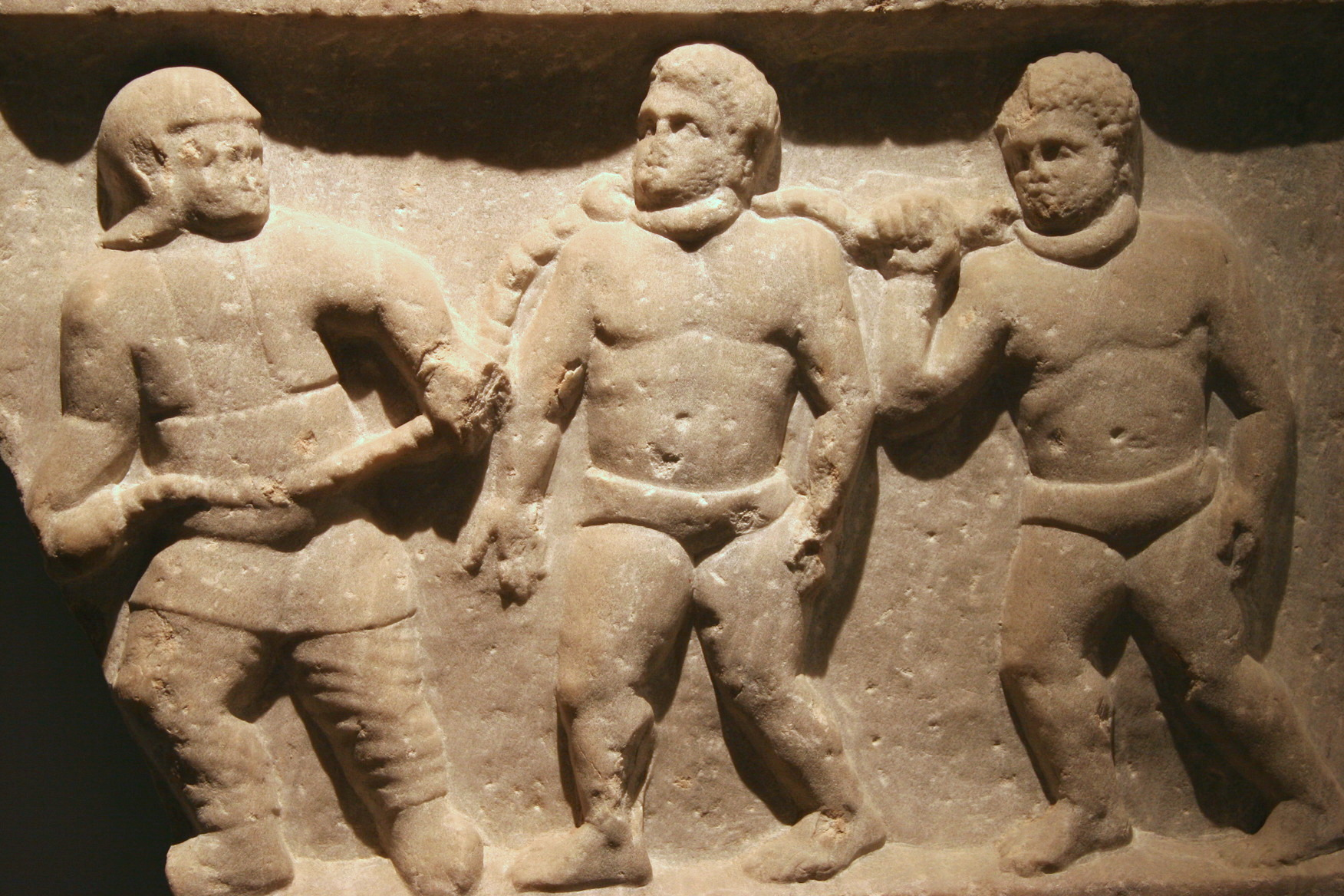
Roman collared slaves

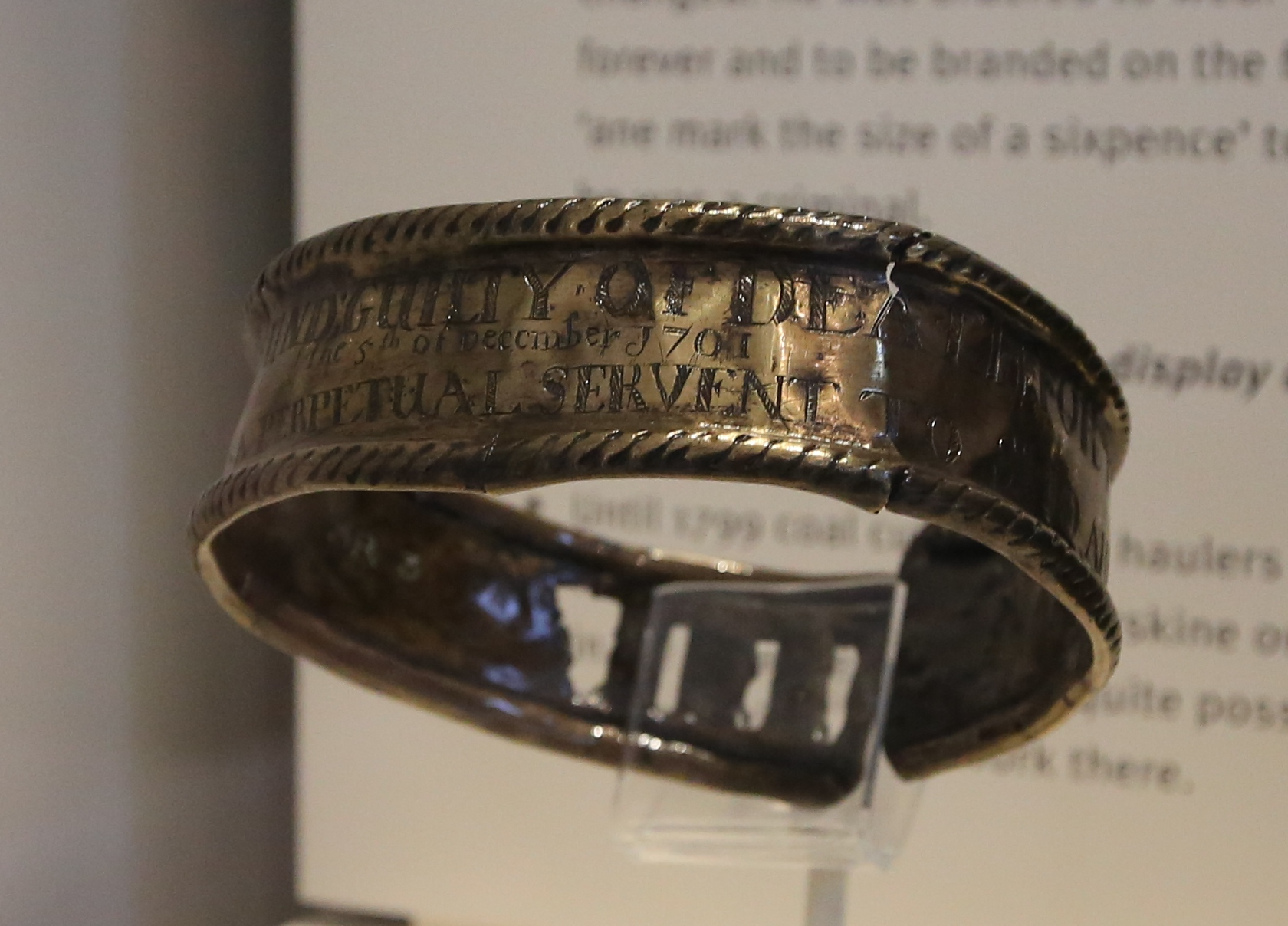
Scottish serf's collar 1701

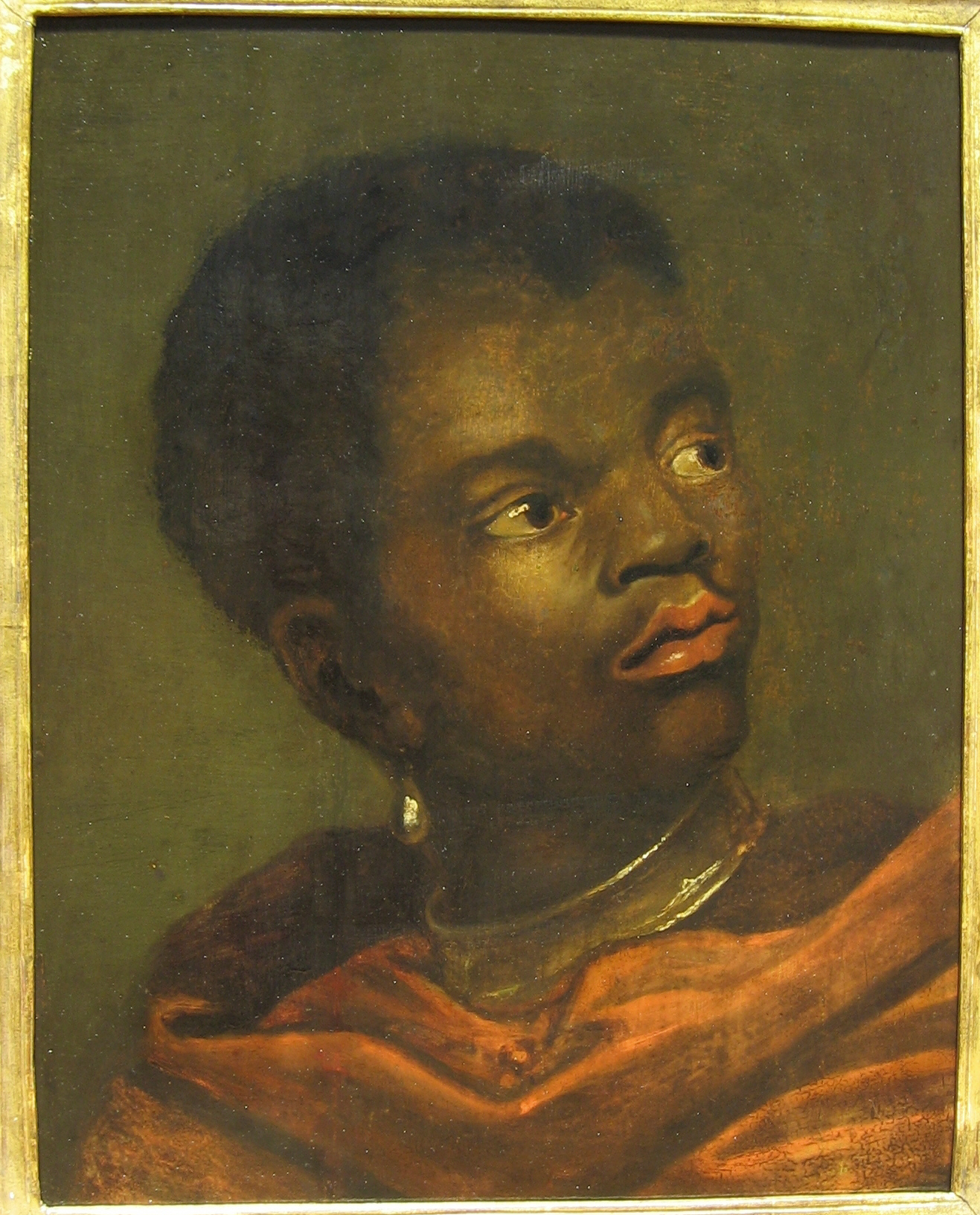
Black boy with slave collar, 17th century

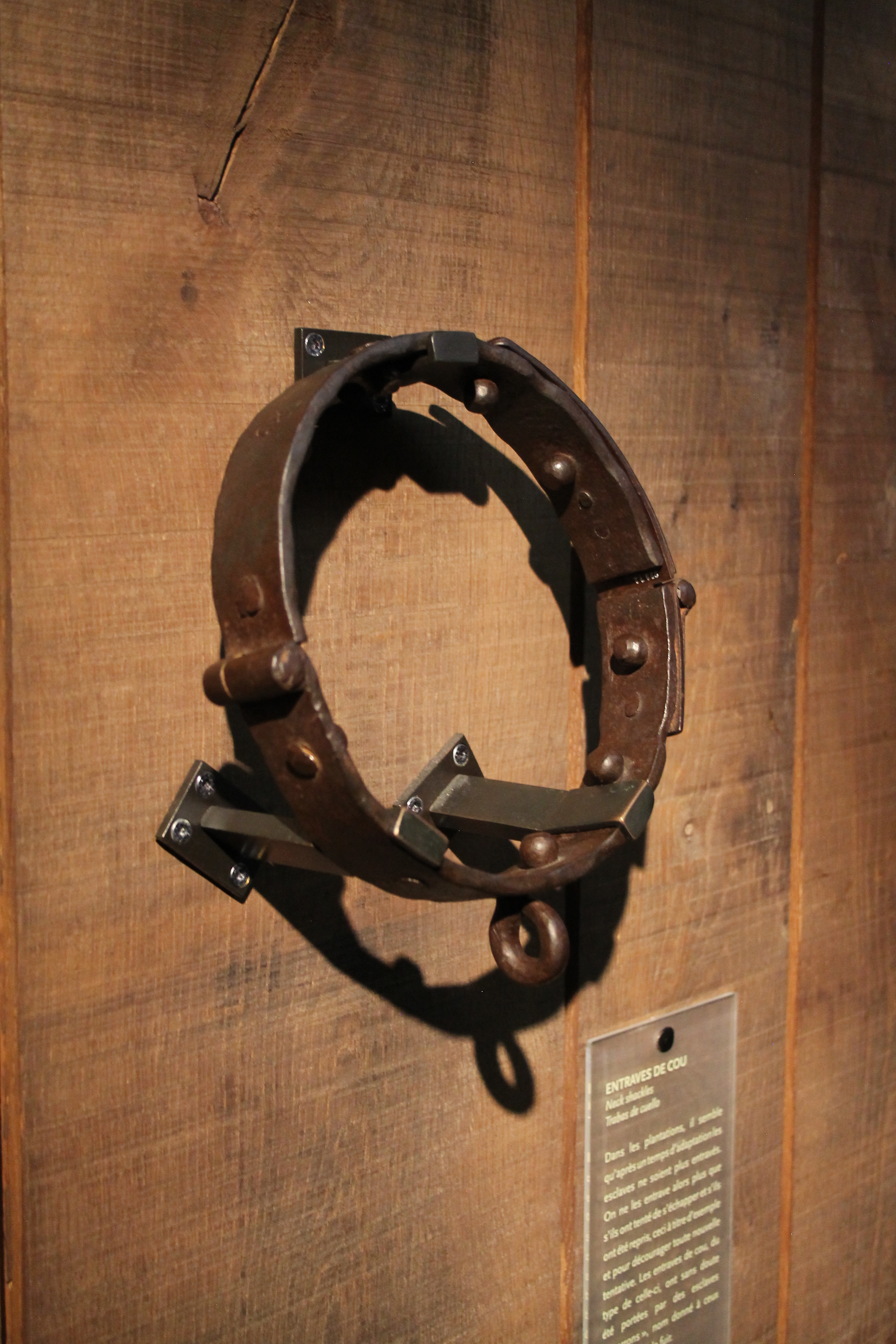
Slave collar, 18th century

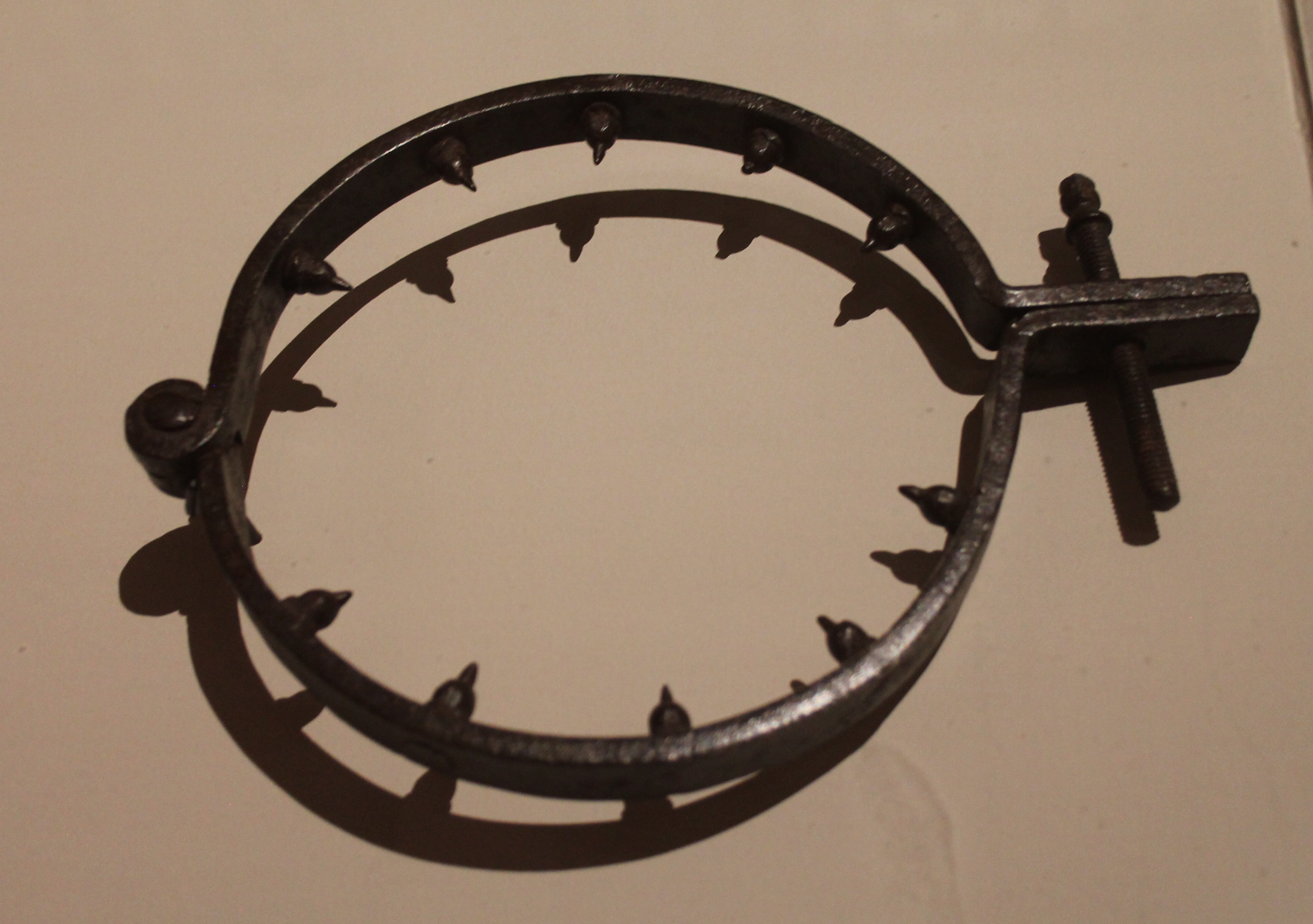
Neck restraint

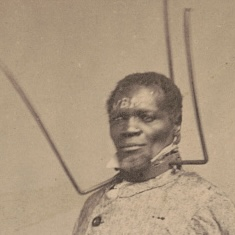
Slave collar on Wilson Chinn, United States, 1863

== See also ==
- Chains, fetters, manacles
- Page (servant)
- Representation of slavery in European art
- Slave iron bit
- Colliers and Salters (Scotland) Act 1775
- Torture of slaves in the United States
