= Shrew's fiddle =

Early modern form of public punishment

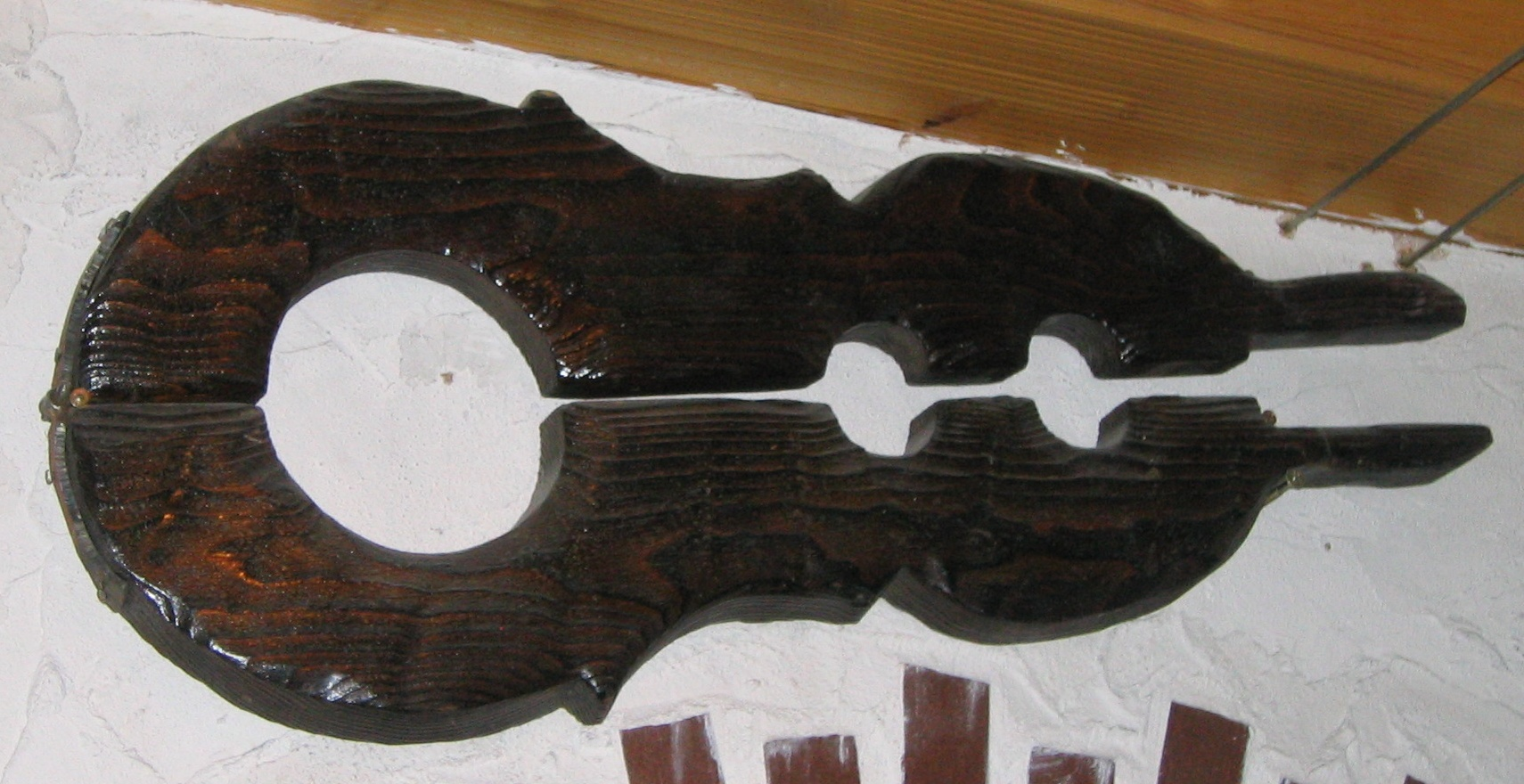
A shrew's fiddle at the torture museum in Freiburg im Breisgau

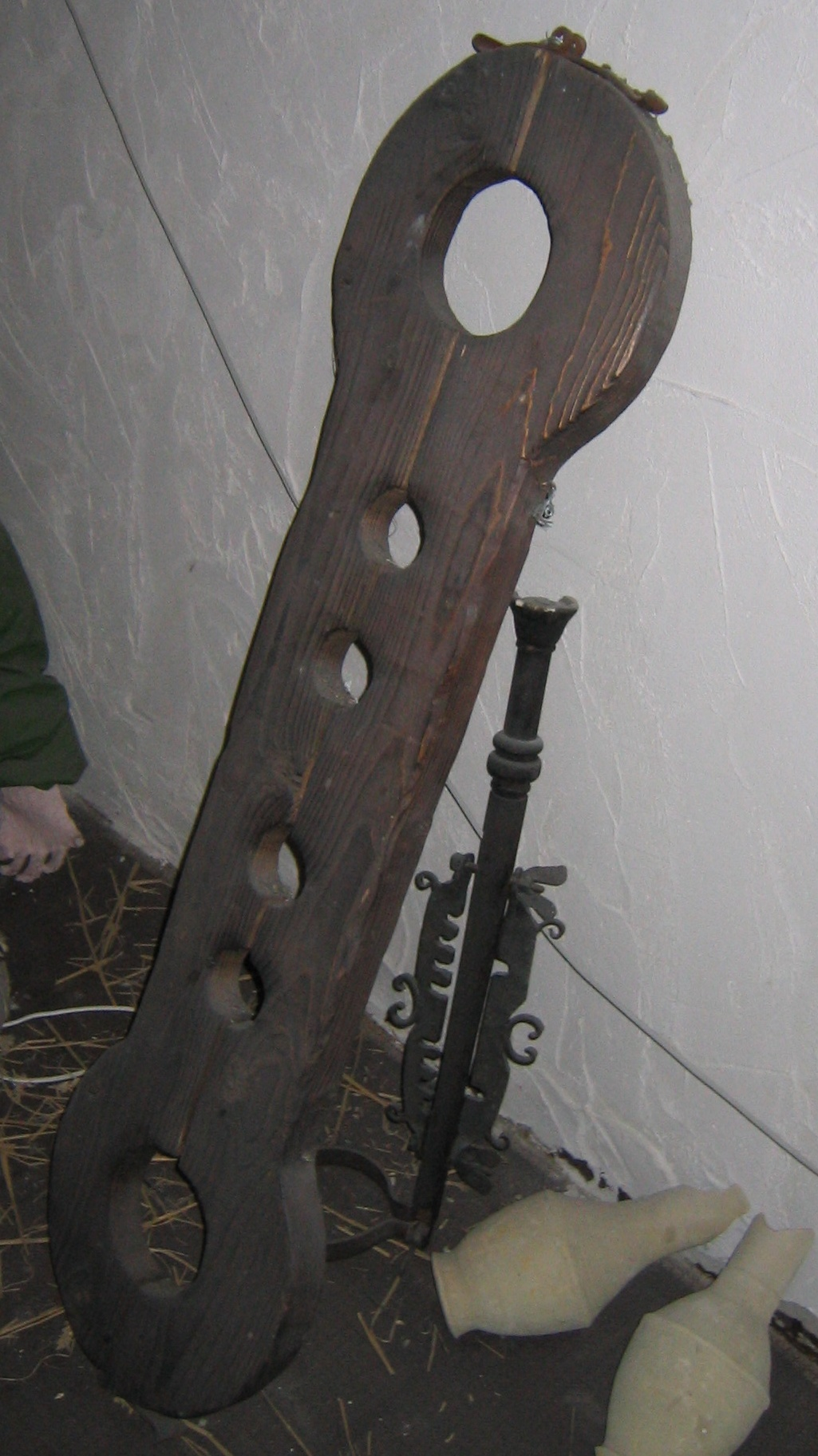
A shrew's fiddle for two at the torture museum in Freiburg im Breisgau

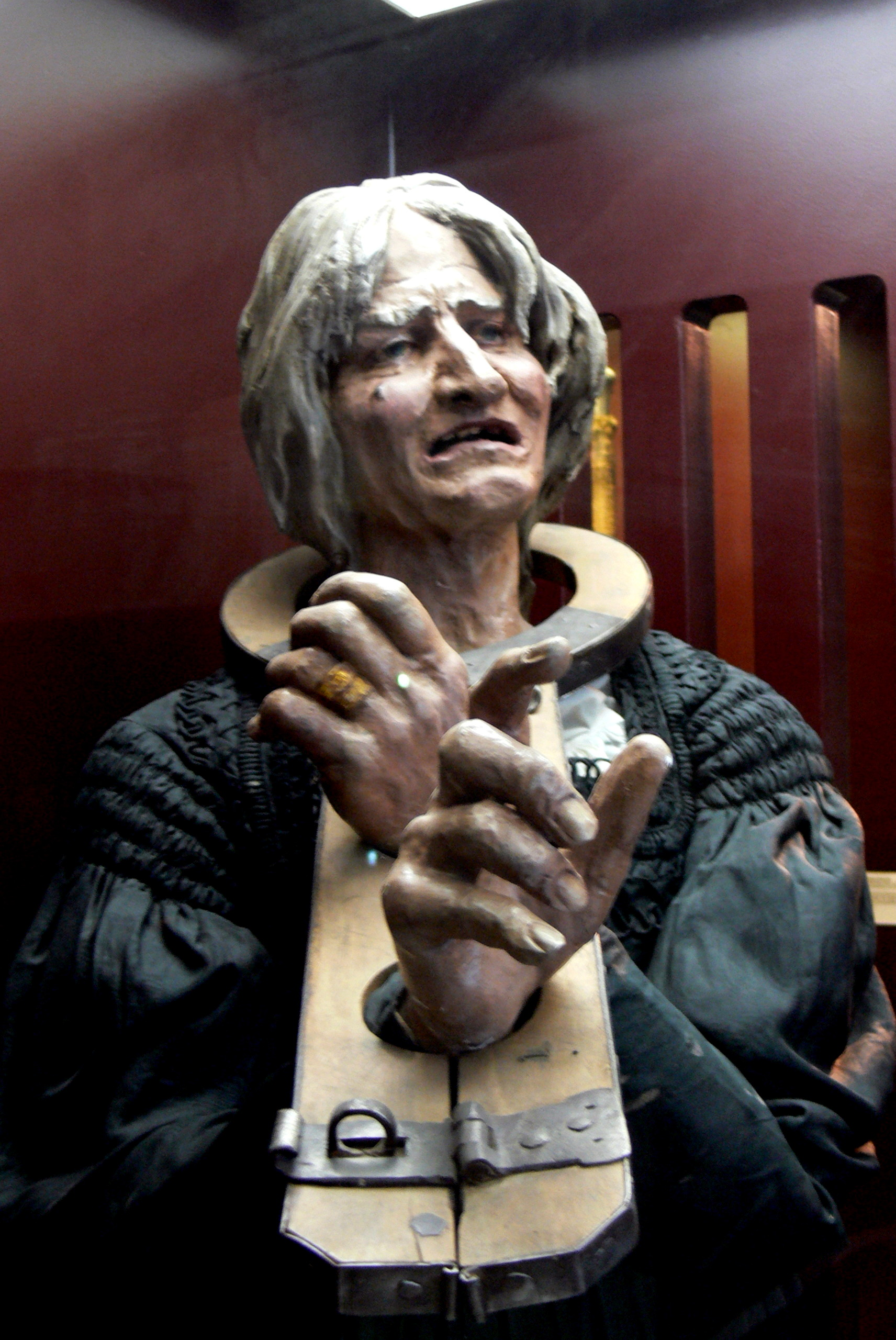
A shrew's fiddle being worn by a dummy at the Oberhausmuseum in Passau

A shrew's fiddle or neck violin is a variation of the yoke, pillory, or rigid irons whereby the wrists are locked in front of the bound person by a hinged board, or steel bar. It was originally used in the Middle Ages as a way of punishing those who were caught bickering or fighting.

== History ==
The shrew's fiddle was used in medieval Germany and Austria, where it was known as a Halsgeige, meaning "neck viola" or "neck violin". It was originally made out of two pieces of wood fitted with a hinge and a lock at the front. The shrew's fiddle had three holes: one was a large hole for the neck, and the other two were smaller holes which fastened the wrists in front of the face.

A bell was sometimes attached to this portable pillory, to alert townspeople that the victim was approaching so that they might be mocked and otherwise humiliated. Another version was a "double fiddle", by which two people could be attached together face-to-face, forcing them to talk to each other. They were not released until the argument had been resolved.

== See also ==
- Jougs
- Scold's bridle
