= Fog House =

Type of summer house in Scotland

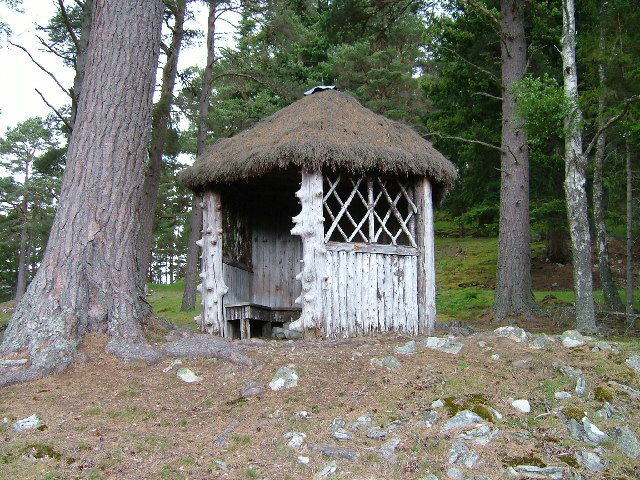
A Fog House at Invercauld near Braemar

Fog Houses are a special type of pleasure or summer house popular in Scotland and at one time commonly found on many country estates as a feature in the pleasure gardens. The name 'Fog' derives from the Scots word for the moss that was a major feature of the building, mainly used to line the walls and roof.

== Description ==
One definition states that Fog Houses were Pleasure Houses, small shelters lined with mossy turf. They were often thatched with materials such as heather. Contents typically included a curved bench placed against the walls with other features such as the example at Bonnington Isle that had its table and bench neatly covered with moss, and the one at Ballochmyle in Ayrshire that had the verses of a Robert Burns song hanging from the walls.

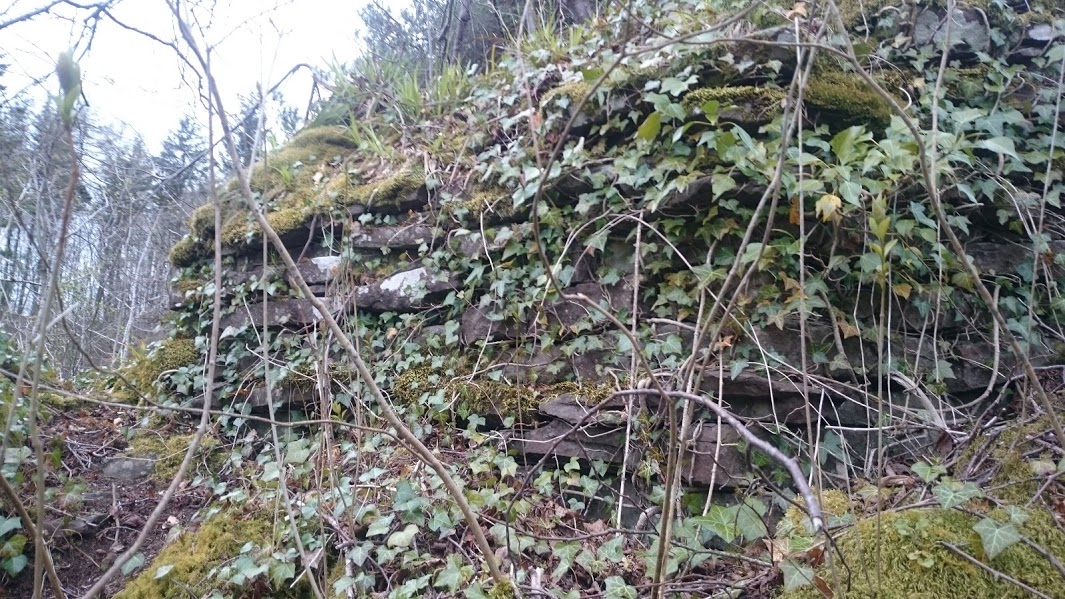
Foundations of the Bonnington Isle Fog House.

== Examples of Fog Houses ==
- Ballochmyle Estate - Destroyed by fire by vandals in March 1944, the Ballochmyle Fog House is said to have been built by Claude Alexander, the brother of Wilhelmina Alexander, on the site where Robert Burns first saw his 'Bonnie Lass o' Ballochmyle'. Other authors state that it was a nephew Boyd Alexander, who built it between 1853 & 1861. In surviving photographs the two support poles at the front of the building appear to be cut fir trees, however they were actually made of iron. The roof was thatched with heather and the flimsy walls appear to be made of or lined with heather and moss. The OS maps show that it was located on one of the many woodland walks to the west of the stables. The Jacob's Ladders Steps gave access to it for visitors approaching from the direction of Catrine.

Mackay records that Robert Burns World Federation urged the Department of Health for Scotland to replace Fog House and the task was left in the hands of the H.M. Office of Works. The work was either not carried out or the building was lost a second time; the metal 'tree trunk' supports were however rescued and now adorn a garden in the locality.

Ballochmyle lies near Mauchline and Robert Burns' Mossgeil Farm where Robert lived for a time. Whilst walking in the private estate he saw Wilhelmina Alexander, sister of the owner, walking alone and this inspired him to compose a romantic song. Burns wrote to her, enclosing the song, seeking her permission to allow him to publish it. Wilhelmina was 30 years old at the time and no great beauty, so thinking that Robert was teasing her and being aware of his reputation she never replied. The correspondence was however in later life one of her most prized possessions and, as stated, the octagonal Ballochmyle Fog House was built in honour of the occasion.

These verses were hung on the walls of the fog house

The Lass o'Ballochmyle

Twas even-the dewy fields were green,
On every blade the pearls hang;
The zephyr wanton'd round the bean,
And bore its fragrant sweets alang:
In ev'ry glen the mavis sang,
All nature list'ning seem'd the while,
Except where greenwood echoes rang,
Amang the braes o' Ballochmyle.

With careless step I onward strayed,
My heart rejoiced in Nature's joy,
When, musing in a lonely glade,
A maiden fair I chanced to spy.
Her look was like the morning's eye,
Her air like Nature's vernal smile;
Perfection whispered, passing by,
Behold the lass o' Ballochmyle!.

On the other panels of the building were crossed swords, a lyre, a bow and arrow and a heart pierced with Cupid's arrow. Cuthbertson visited in the 1940s and comments on the winding mossy paths by which the 'heather house' was reached, confirming that it was built on the site where the poet first espied Wilhelmina Alexander. He goes on to mention the rarely visited 'Poet's Seat', a vantage point where Burns would sit and think over his poems and songs. The seat was the branch of an oak that grew horizontally at this point.

The building that overlooked Gaans Holm was octagonal and nine feet wide. It was originally open on three sides however it was later altered to have a doorway and two windows. It had symbols such as hearts and cupid's arrows in addition to the aforementioned verses. The board with the verses was stolen and only recovered twenty years later from an address in Glasgow.

Douglas refers to the fog house as a rustic grotto and states that the first two verses of the Lass of Ballochmyle were recorded on a wood tablet in a facsimile of Burns's handwriting.

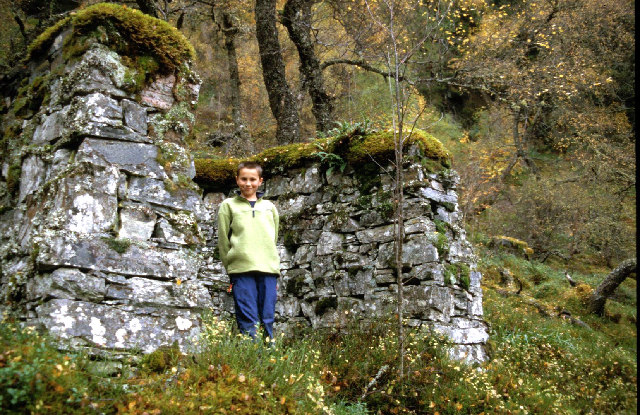
Ruins of the old New Mar Lodge Fog House

- Bonnington Estate - The cast iron bridge here is presumed to be that built for Lady Mary Ross who replaced or adapted the dovecot which stood on Bonnington Isle, to which the bridge leads, with a 'Fog House', lined with moss. The Wordsworths visited the site in 1803 and Dorothy Wordsworth described the interior of the fog house as being 'as snug as a bird's nest' and resembling a scooped out haystack. It had a domed roof and the walls, roof and furniture were neatly covered with moss. It reminded her of huts illustrated in the book of Captain Cook's Voyages. The building had a lockable door and was reached as mentioned via a cast iron bridge that replaced an earlier wooden one. Dorothy was however far from impressed by the view from this fog house and saw it as being too close to the path frequented by visitors. She did however regard it as being the finest example of a fog house that she saw during her tour in Scotland. The fog house here no longer exists although the stone foundations are still visible and the bridge, although still present, cannot be used.
- Craufurdland Estate - A fog house is shown in the 1856 OS map on the northern side of the Craufurdland Water close to Mount Tarbor however it is no longer marked in 1897.
- Invercauld Estate - A fog house in 2010 was located above Invercauld Castle on a woodland walk overlooking the park. It is featured in the photograph above.
- New Mar Lodge - locally known as Corriemulzie Cottage, New Mar Lodge is situated near Linn of Corriemulzie at the top of Mar Lodge Brae. The Fog House is now a ruin with only the drystone walls surviving.
- Penicuik Estate (NT 21728 58916) - In the 1990s a ruinous fog house was recorded on the Pencuik Estate.
- Fullarton Estate - At the Fullarton Estate near Troon in South Ayrshire had thatched lodge called 'Heather House' that stood at the entrance to the house until it burned down in the 1950s.
- Braemar Castle - There is a fog house near the castle. It was recently refurbished as part of the castle closure for major improvement works. The castle (built in 1628) re-opened to the public on May 2 2024.
- Castle Semple - The old OS maps show that a Fog House once stood on Courtshaw Hill close to Lochwinnoch and the site of the old mansion house and its cascades feature. A moot hill was also once located here.
