= Reed Loch =

Coordinates: 55°32′0.0″N 4°37′48.4″W

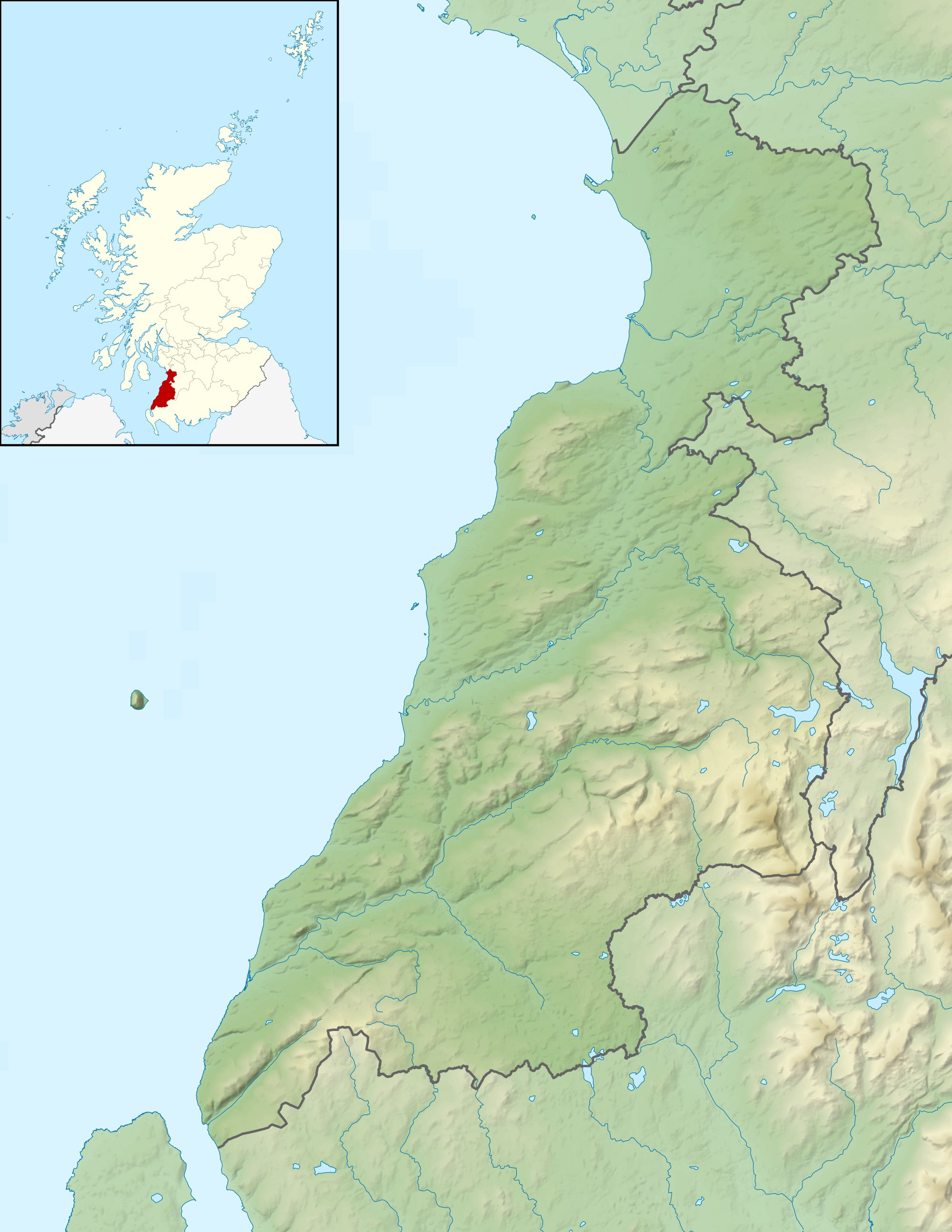
- Location within South Ayrshire
- Location: Troon, South Ayrshire, Scotland
- Type: Old freshwater loch
- Primary inflows: Darley Burn, rainfall and natural drainage
- Primary outflows: Darley Burn
- Basin countries: Scotland
- Average depth: Shallow
- Settlements: Troon

The Reed Loch was also known as Loch Green. As a curling pond it was probably known as the Fullarton House Pond, located as it was on the edge of the Fullarton House and Crosbie Castle estate curtilage, It was originally a shallow and overgrown freshwater loch, hence the name Reed Loch and its marshy appearance on Johnson's 1828 map. It was cleaned out and used as a curling pond in the latter part of the 19th century before falling out of use and being drained in the late 20th century.

== History ==
The loch was a natural feature, probably a post-glacial 'Kettle Hole' once of greater extent, fed mainly by the Darley Burn, rainfall, and field drainage. Its existence is recorded in the placename of Lochgreen House. The Darley Burn was diverted away from the site which however remained dominated by reeds willows and at best constituted poor quality grazing. The loch site is fully drained today (datum 2012) however it still floods in winter. The old Crosbie church and cemetery lie to the south of the old loch site.

The Isle of Pins Road is named for the unusual pillar that stands near the old entrance drive to Fullarton House and the name derives from the time when the pillar stood as a folly or feature on what was an island prior to the draining of the loch circa 1800. In 1876 the Reed Loch is recorded as being the favourite curling loch in the district. The drainage of the loch is this area is a covered burn that runs in front of Lochgreen and gravel beds prominent in the nearby field show the one time extent of standing water in the area.

=== Usage ===
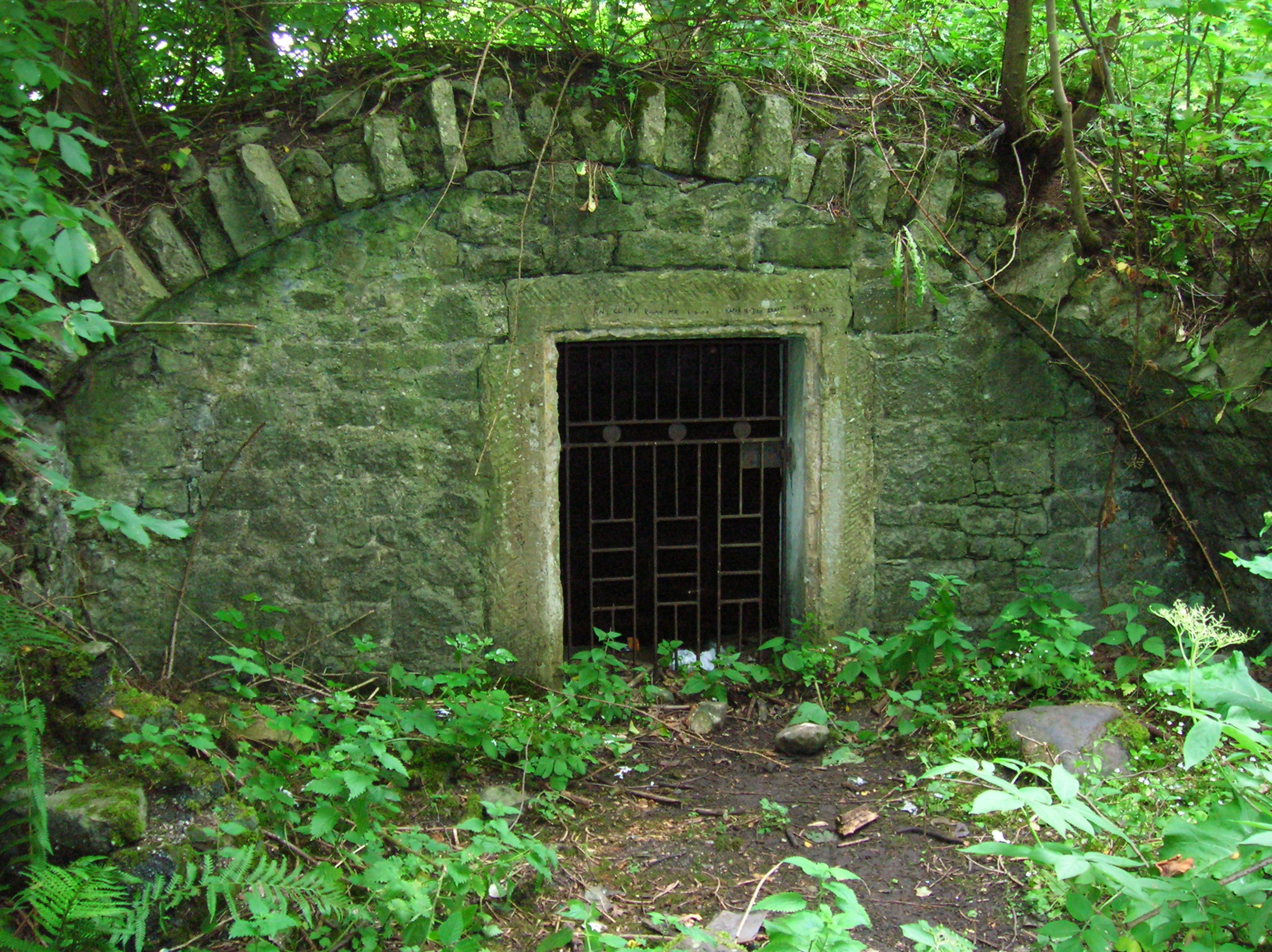
The Fullarton estate Ice House.

Fullarton House had an ice house that was constructed from the ruins of Crosbie Castle and this would require to be filled with ice from a site such as the Reed Loch. No watermills seem to have been associated with Reed Loch. It was latterly dug out and used for curling; a possible curling house is shown just to the south of the loch margin. Various curling matches are recorded, with Monkton v. Troon playing a friendly game on Reed Loch in 1861. Fullarton House Pond played host to a match between Troon Portland v Ayr Albert in 1862.

=== Cartographic evidence ===
The 1857 OS map shows the Reed Loch in amongst what is probably willow dominated woodland. The Darley Burn may have fed the loch until it was covered over and diverted. The 1896 Os map shows a very different water body, a large curling pond now covering 2.37 acres and with open water and no woodland. The small building indicated may be a Curling house. By 1958 the OS map shows the curling pond to be overgrown and no longer marked as a curling pond. By the late 1970s the wetland area is shown for some unknown reason as 'Monktonhill Ground'. The 20 metre contour delineates the limit of the old loch to the north and east.

Location of Reed Loch, South Ayrshire

=== Drainage ===
The loch's drainage may have begun in the 18th century when Alexander Montgomerie, 10th Earl of Eglinton, was pursuing a number of agricultural improvements on his extensive estates and other landowners were following his example. Old maps show that the Darley Burn once ran through the Fullarton estate as an open water course.

== Micro-history ==
Lochgreen Junction was once located on the nearby railway line.
