= Wilhelmina Alexander =

- An 1828 chapbook or garland with Burns' Song 'The Lass o'Ballochmyle'
- Born: 1756; Newton House, Elderslie, Scotland
- Died: 1843; Glasgow, Scotland
- Occupation: Lady of Leisure

Wilhelmina Alexander (1756–1843), was born at Newton House, Elderslie, Renfrewshire. She was the 4th daughter of Claud Alexander of Newton and Joanna, daughter of Alexander Cuninghame of Craigends. Her lasting fame derives from being Robert Burns's 'The Bonnie Lass o'Ballochmyle' in the song of that title. Robert Burns was accustomed to taking walks and musing over his poetry and songs in the Ballochmyle Estate next to the River Ayr when he caught sight of her one-day and composed the song in memory of the event. She refused publication at the time and Burns never forgave this perceived slight on his genius, Wilhelmina never married, she did however treasure the letter and the manuscript of the song until her dying day.

== Life and character ==
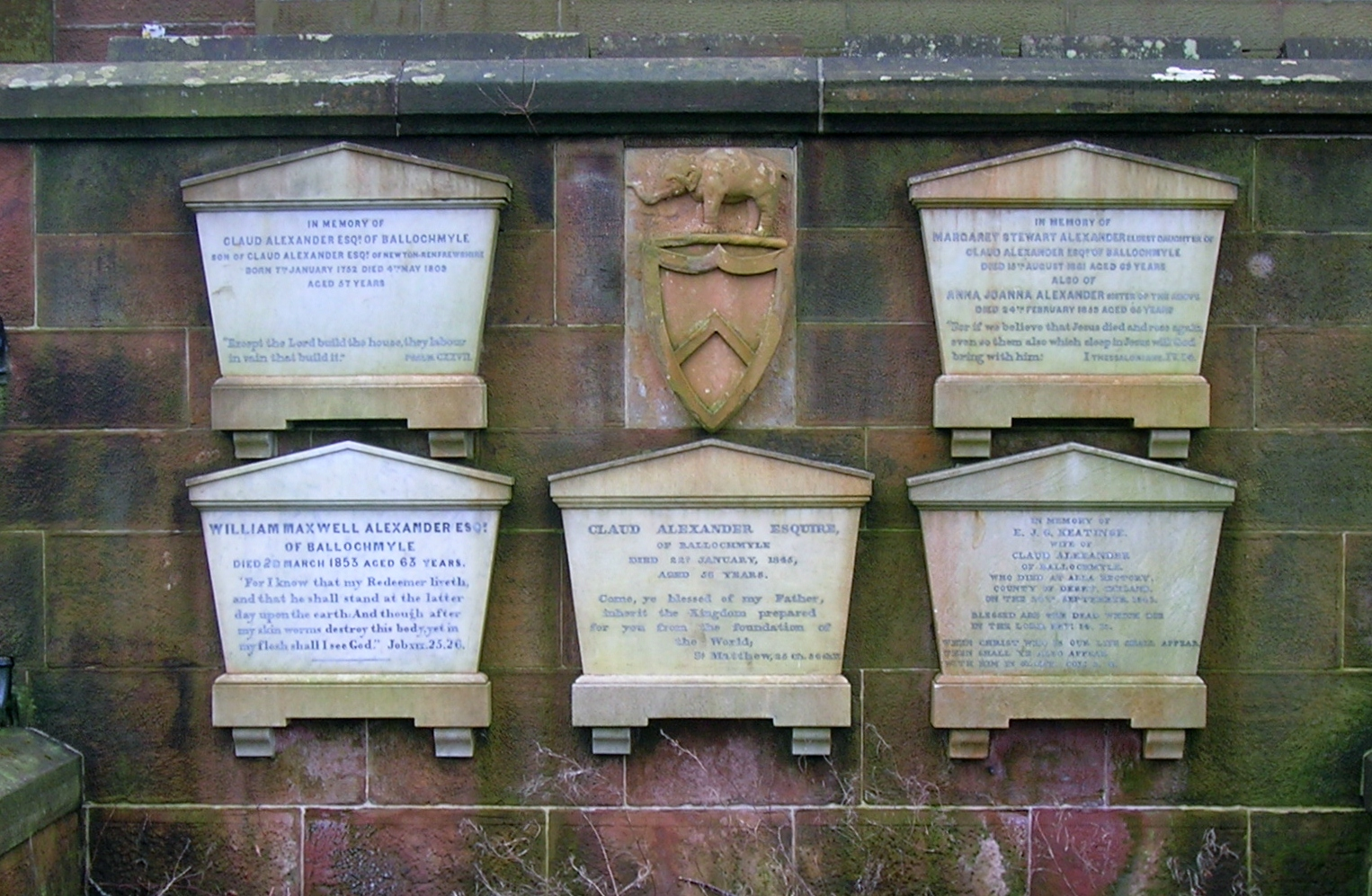
Memorials to Wilhelmina's brother Claud and descendants at Mauchline parish church.

Wilhelmina lived at Ballochmyle House with her brother Claud Alexander who had purchased the Ballochmyle Estate in 1783 from the previous laird, Sir John Whiteford who had lost much of his money in the Douglas, Heron and Company Bank crash. Claud had made his fortune as the paymaster-general of the East India Company's troops in Bengal. Prior to the Alexanders owning Ballochmyle Robert Burns had been in the habit of walking through the otherwise private policies thanks to his friendship with the Whitefords, the then lairds. In 1785 Burns wrote The Braes of Ballochmyle in memory of the "..amiable and excellent family of Whiteford..".

== Association with Robert Burns ==
Although Wilhelmina never actually spoke to Robert Burns, on the site where the poet first saw his 'Bonnie Lass o' Ballochmyle' a Fog House was built in his honour and to the occasion of his first seeing her one July day. In surviving photographs the two support poles at the front of the building appear to be cut fir trees, however they were actually made of iron. The roof is thatched and the flimsy walls appear to be made of heather. It was located on one of the many woodland walks, approached from one of the driveways or from the top of the Jacob's Ladders steps that once overlooked the River Ayr.

The Ballochmyle estate lies near Mauchline and Robert Burns' Gilbert Burns' Mossgiel Farm where Robert lived for a time. Whilst on an evening walk through the private estate he encountered Wilhelmina Alexander, sister of the owner, walking alone and this inspired him to compose a romantic song. Wilhelmina had quickly left the scene upon this unexpected tryst in the early evening on her brother's lands. Burns wrote to her on 18 November 1786, enclosing a copy of the song, seeking her permission to allow him to publish it in his second edition of his 'Poems, Chiefly in the Scottish Dialect'. She was not named in the song however her identity as the main figure was clear for all to see.

Burns had started his letter: "Madam, Poets are outre Beings, so much the children on wayward Fancy and capricious Whim, that I believe the world generally allows them a larger latitude in the rules of Propriety, than the sober Sons of Judgement and Prudence ..."

Wilhelmina was at least 30 years old at the time and no great beauty, so thinking that Robert was teasing her and after becoming aware of his reputation and after seeking advice from her brother she decided that the lack of a reply would be the best option. Burns begged Mrs Stewart of Stair to use her influence on Wilhelmina to no effect.

=== Aftermath ===
==== Robert Burns ====
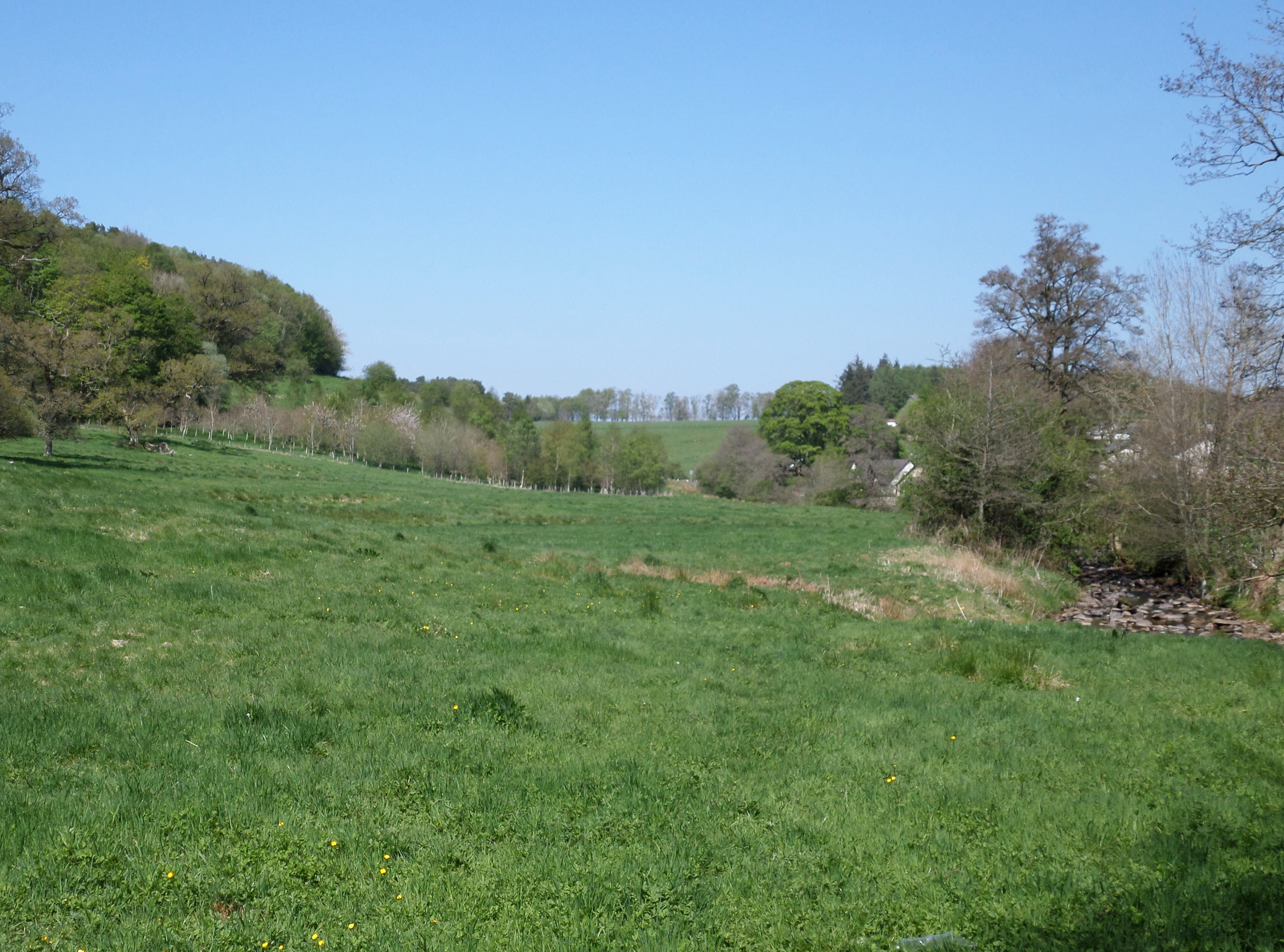
Ballochmyle Woods

When in Edinburgh, Burns expressed his frustration to his friend Gavin Hamilton writing "My two songs on Miss Alexander and Miss Peggy Kennedy were tried by a jury of literati, and found defamatory libels against the fastidious powers of Poesy and Taste, and the author forbidden to print them under pain of forfeiture of character." He added "I cannot help shedding a tear to the memory of two songs that had cost me some pains, and that I valued a good deal; but I must submit. My poor unfortunate songs come again across my memory. Damn the pedant, frigid soul of criticism for ever and ever."

Some years after the event Burns wrote in the Glenriddell Manuscript: "Well, Mr Burns and did the lady give you the desired permission? No! She was too fine a lady to notice so plain a compliment." He went on: "As to her great brothers, whom I have since met in life, on more equal terms of respectability, why should I quarrel their want of attention to me? - When Fate swore that their purses should be full, Nature was equally positive that their heads should be empty. - 'Men of another fashion were incapable of being unpolite?' - Ye canna mak a silk-purse o' a sow's lug."

At the time of writing the song he was basking in the fame generated through the first 1786 edition of his poems and the flattery of Mrs Dunlop, clearly the refusal and perceived attitude of Wilhelmina deeply and permanently dented both his pride and his new found confidence. A local acquaintance, Saunders Tait, did little to improve Burns' feelings when this 'village laureate' was invited to Ballochmyle to sing in person a song that he written about Mrs Alexander. 'Sawney' added insult to injury by becoming a privileged frequenter of Ballochmyle and by being given a reward for his locally popular song.

The song was finally published, long after the poets death, in 1802.

==== Wilhelmina Alexander ====
The correspondence from Burns was however in later life one of her most prized possessions which accompanied with her wherever she went, including her move to Glasgow from Ballochmyle, despite her relations attempts to keep them at the mansion house and, as stated, the Ballochmyle Fog House was built in honour of the occasion. Poems, Wilhelmina is buried in the Alexander family lair in the Old Inchinnan churchyard in Renfrewshire.

These verses were hung on the walls of the Ballochmyle Fog House. The song is also known as Song on Miss Wilhelmina Alexander.

The Lass o'Ballochmyle

Twas even-the dewy fields were green,
On every blade the pearls hang;
The zephyr wanton'd round the bean,
And bore its fragrant sweets alang:
In ev'ry glen the mavis sang,
All nature list'ning seem'd the while,
Except where greenwood echoes rang,
Amang the braes o' Ballochmyle.

With careless step I onward strayed,
My heart rejoiced in Nature’s joy,
When, musing in a lonely glade,
A maiden fair I chanced to spy.
Her look was like the morning’s eye,
Her air like Nature’s vernal smile;
Perfection whispered, passing by,
Behold the lass o’ Ballochmyle!.

Douglas refers to the fog house as a rustic grotto and states that the two verses were recorded on a tablet.

Cuthbertson visited in the 1940s and comments on the winding mossy paths by which the 'heather house' was reached, confirming that it was built on the site where the poet, leaning against a tree, first espied Wilhelmina Alexander. He goes on to mention the rarely visited 'Poet's Seat', a vantage point where Burns would sit and think over his poems and songs. The seat was the branch of an oak that grew horizontally at this point.

== See also ==
- Jean Armour
- Alison Begbie
- Mary Campbell (Highland Mary)
- Nelly Kilpatrick
- Jessie Lewars
- Mary Morison
- Ann Park
- Anne Rankine
- Isabella Steven
- Alexander Tait (poet)
- Peggy Thompson
- Fog House
