= Loch Gate =

Coordinates: 55°36′30.0″N 4°11′9.0″W

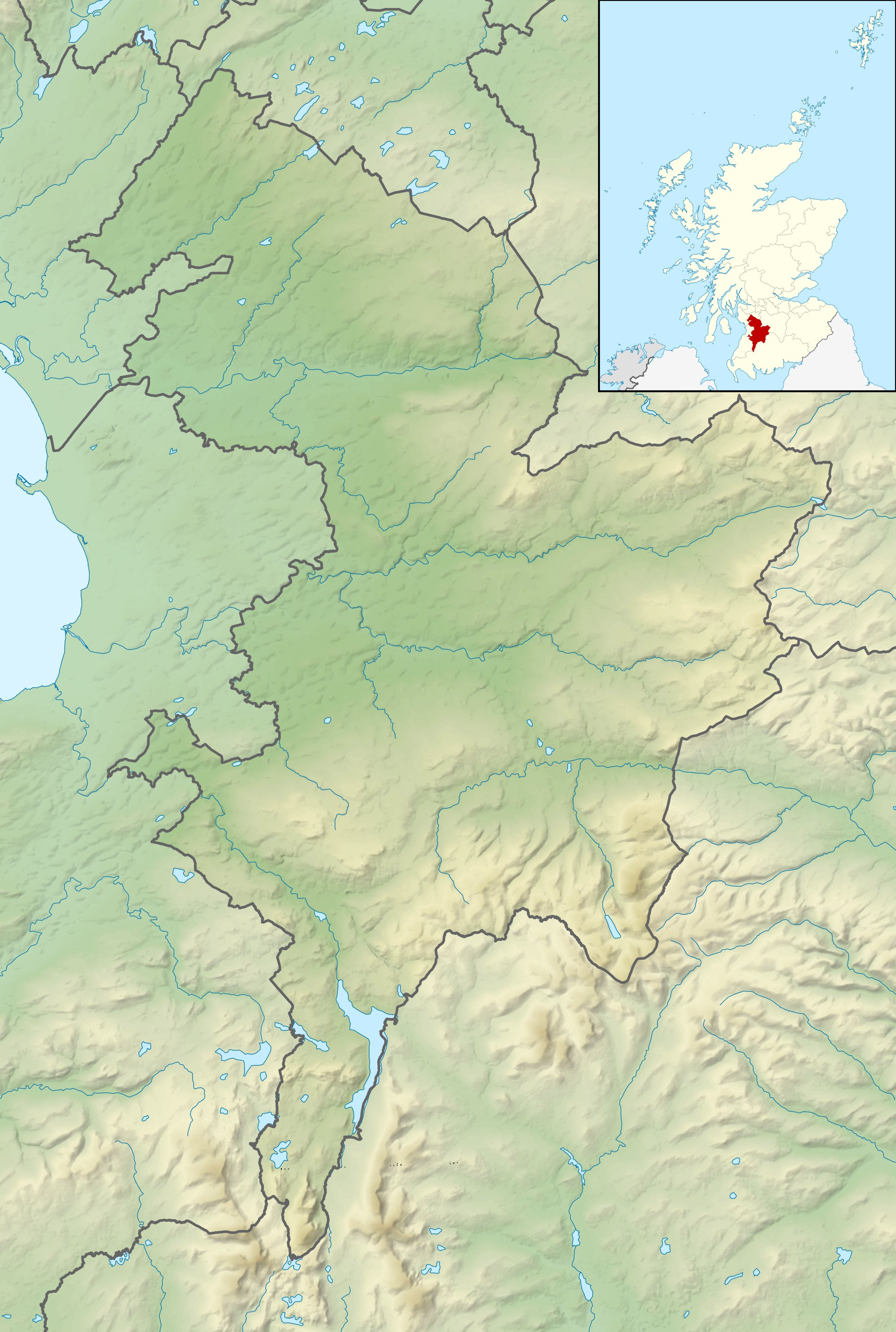
- Location within East Ayrshire
- Location: Galston, East Ayrshire, Scotland
- Type: Freshwater loch
- Primary inflows: Rainfall and runoff
- Primary outflows: Avon Water
- Basin countries: Scotland
- Settlements: Galston

Loch Gate (NS 62389 37170), previously known as Loch Gait, was a freshwater loch, partly in the East Ayrshire Council Area and partly in South Lanarkshire, now mainly drained, near Darvel, lying in a glacial kettle hole, Parish of Galston, Scotland.

== The loch ==
Loch Gate, at the eastern extremity of Galston Pavi’s, was once a sheet of deep water, but now is a small area of open water in a marsh. By 1846 the loch is recorded as being little more than an area of marshy ground.

=== Cartographic evidence ===
Armstrong's map of 1775 clearly shows the loch close to the Strathaven to Galston toll road. Ainslie's Map of 1823 shows the loch with a Lochside dwelling nearby, with a single inflow. Thomson's map of 1832 shows a Lochside and an East Lochgate with the outflow running into the Avon water.

Loch Gate is recorded on the 1897 OS maps as a remnant, close to Lochgate Farm with only a small area (0.290 Acre) of open water In the late 1880s it is recorded that the deep waters of Gate Loch (sic) had been drained.

The location of Loch Gate, East Ayrshire

== Uses ==
=== The Battle of Loudoun Hill ===
The Battle of Loudoun Hill took place in 1307. Robert the Bruce encounter English forces, under Aymer de Valence, 2nd Earl of Pembroke. On 10 May, Bruce's men dug a series of trenches, forcing the English towards boggy ground around Loch Gait, allowing the 500–600 Scots to repulse an army of 3000. The first attack broke, and the English fled the field. Following the battle, Bruce left his brother Edward Bruce in command of the area, and headed north to continue his guerilla campaign in Buchan.

== Archaeology ==
A turf banked circular enclosure is situated on a small promontory on the south side of the old loch, around 9m in diameter, it has a turf bank, but no clear entrance, however the enclosure has been damaged by forestry drainage works.

== See also ==
- Bruntwood Loch
- Whitehill Loch
- Loch Brown
