= Whitehill Loch =

Coordinates: 55°34′14.2″N 4°23′16.4″W

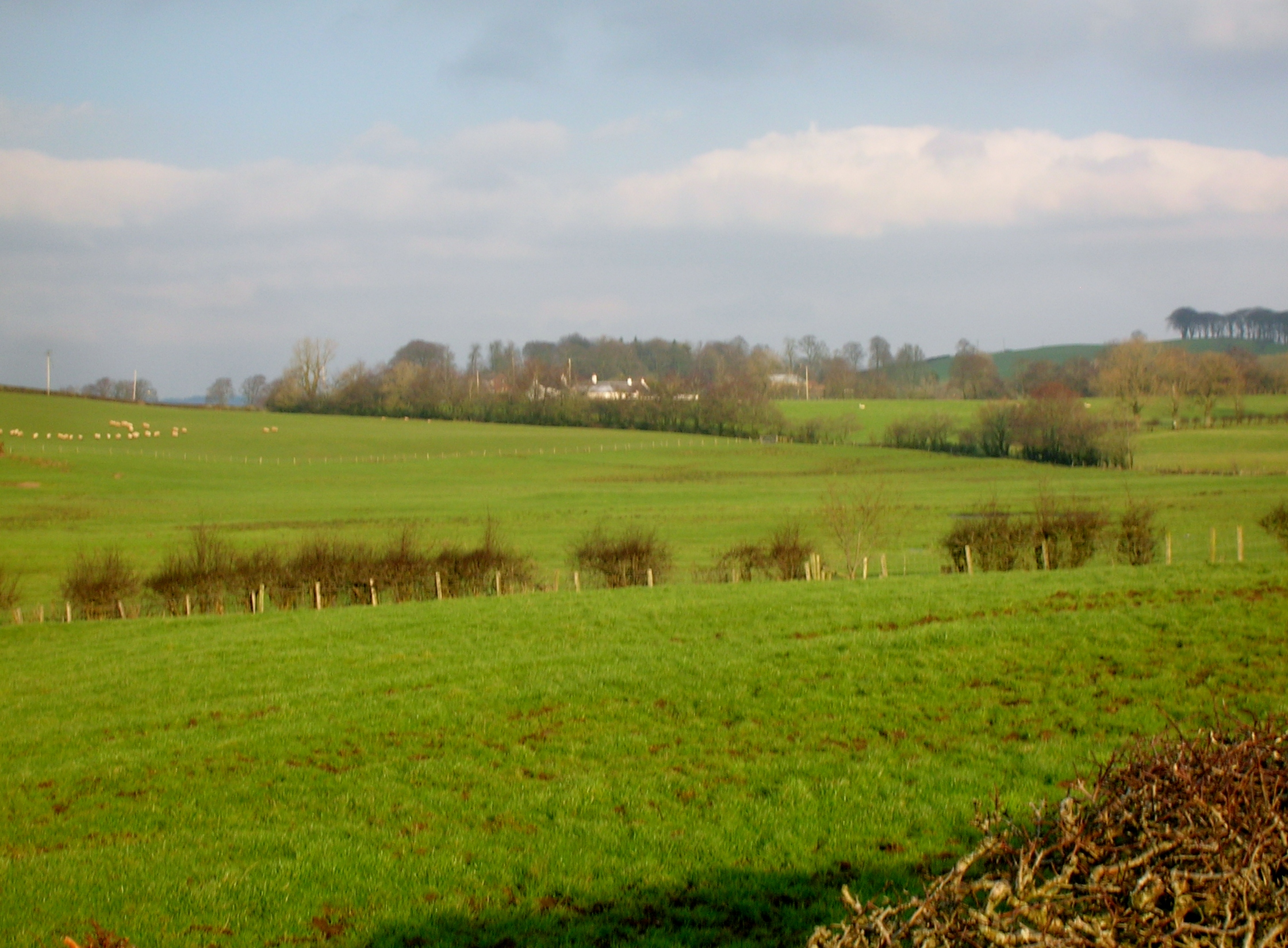
- The site of Whitehill Loch and curling pond

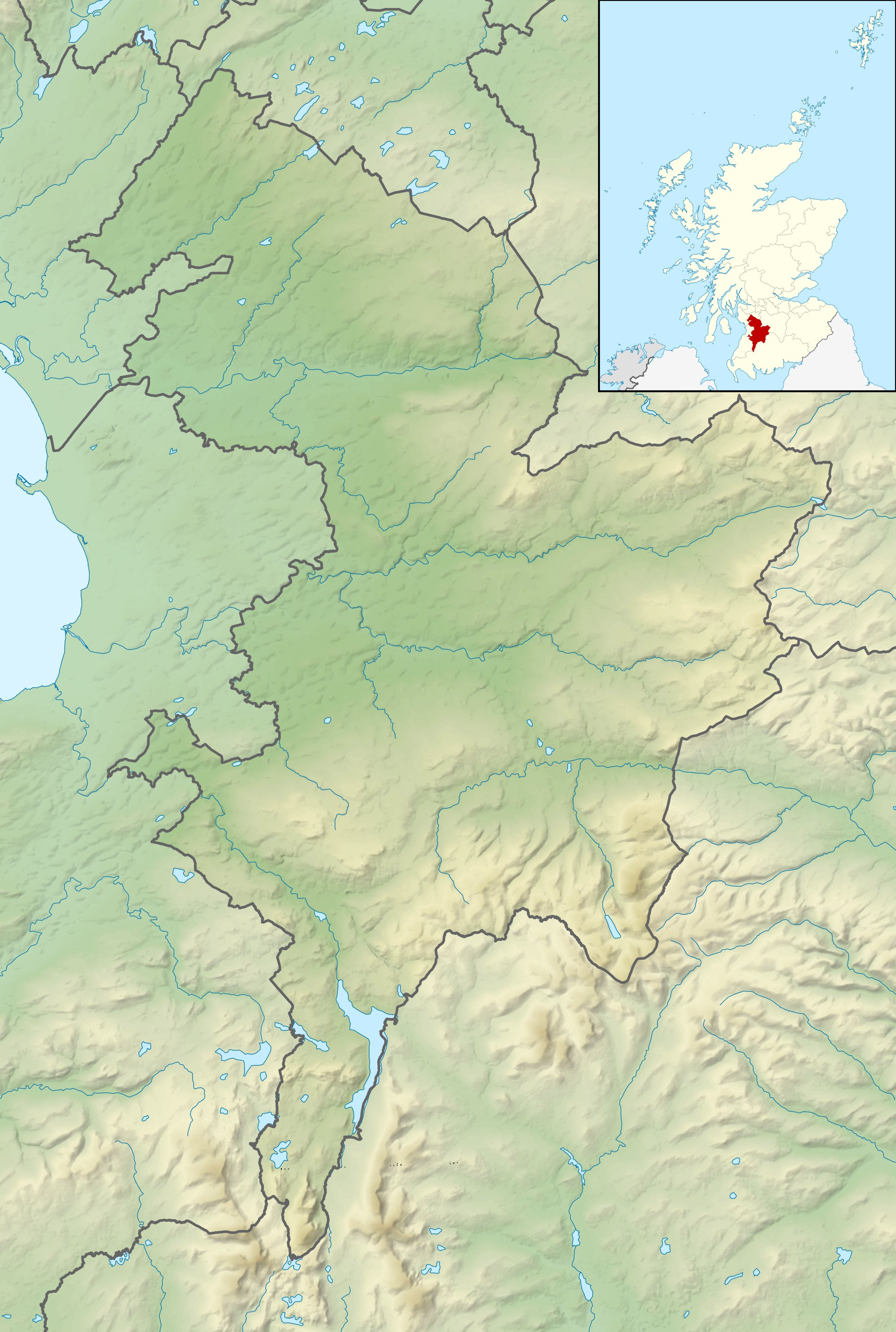
- Location within East Ayrshire
- Location: East Ayrshire, Scotland
- Type: Freshwater loch
- Primary inflows: Rainfall and runoff
- Primary outflows: Lochhouse Burn
- Basin countries: Scotland
- Settlements: Galston

Whitehill Loch (NS 49240 33240), previously known as Hillhouse Loch was a freshwater loch in the East Ayrshire Council Area, now drained, near Galston, in the Parish of Riccarton, lying in a glacial Kettle Hole.

== The loch ==
Whitehill Loch was one of several small lochs within the Parish of Galston, lying within a detached portion of the Parish of Riccarton, Ayrshire.

=== Cartographic evidence ===
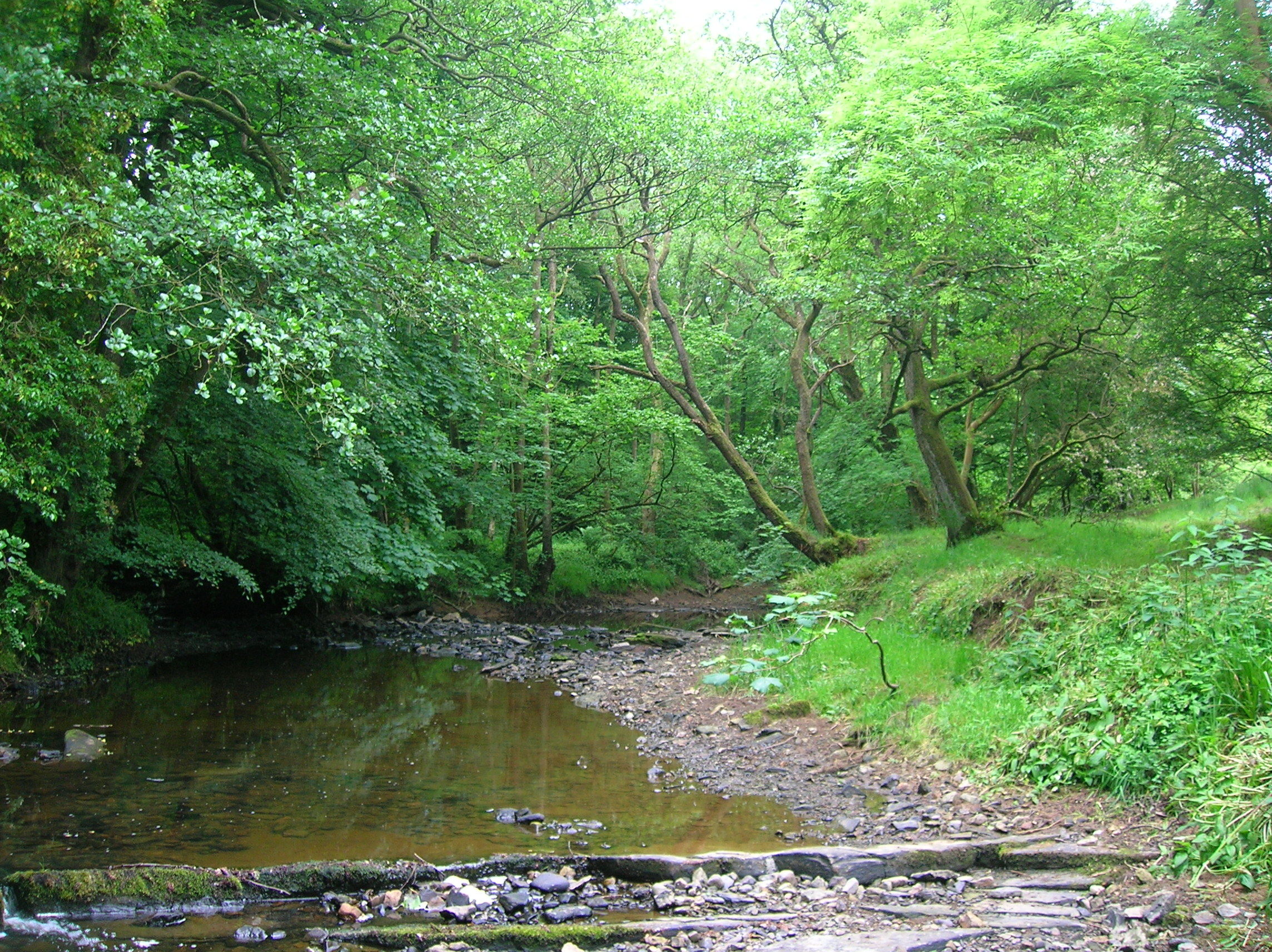
The Little Sorn Burn.

Blaeu's Atlas of Scotland, 1654 shows a 'Hilhos Loch' lying between Hilhous (Hillhouse) and Whythil (Whitehill) in the bailiary of Kyle, with a single outflow running into the Little Sorn Burn near Little Sorn. The estate policies of Cessnock and Carnell are shown to the west of the roughly circular loch. In 1857 the dwelling at Lochhouse is shown with a major ditch running down from the site of the loch and the stump of the original outflow and confluence with the Little Sorn Burn. The 1895 6" OS map shows a Lochhouse, abandoned by 1910 and now demolished, on the course of a major drain running down from the site of the loch down towards the Little Sorn Burn. A track ran up to Hillhouse Farm from the dwelling at Lochhouse. The satellite image of ploughed fields shows anaerobic soil markings typical of loch beds, etc.

The loch shore formed part of the boundary of the Parish of Riccarton. The 1971 OS map indicates the remnants of the loch as an enclosed marshy area, probably that retained for curling, drained through ditches leading down to the Little Sorn Burn.

The location of Whitehill Loch, East Ayrshire

== Uses ==
Curling is recorded on Whitehill Loch, namely Loudoun v Tarbolton, on 25 February 1830. Craigmill Mill was located further down the Cessnock Water but does not appear to have been powered by the loch's waters.

== Micro-history ==
The loch was drained for agriculture well before the nearby lochs of Bruntwood and Brown, last being recorded clearly circa 1654. The loch was drained through a culvert that was later converted to a pipe.

== Views of Whitehill Loch site ==
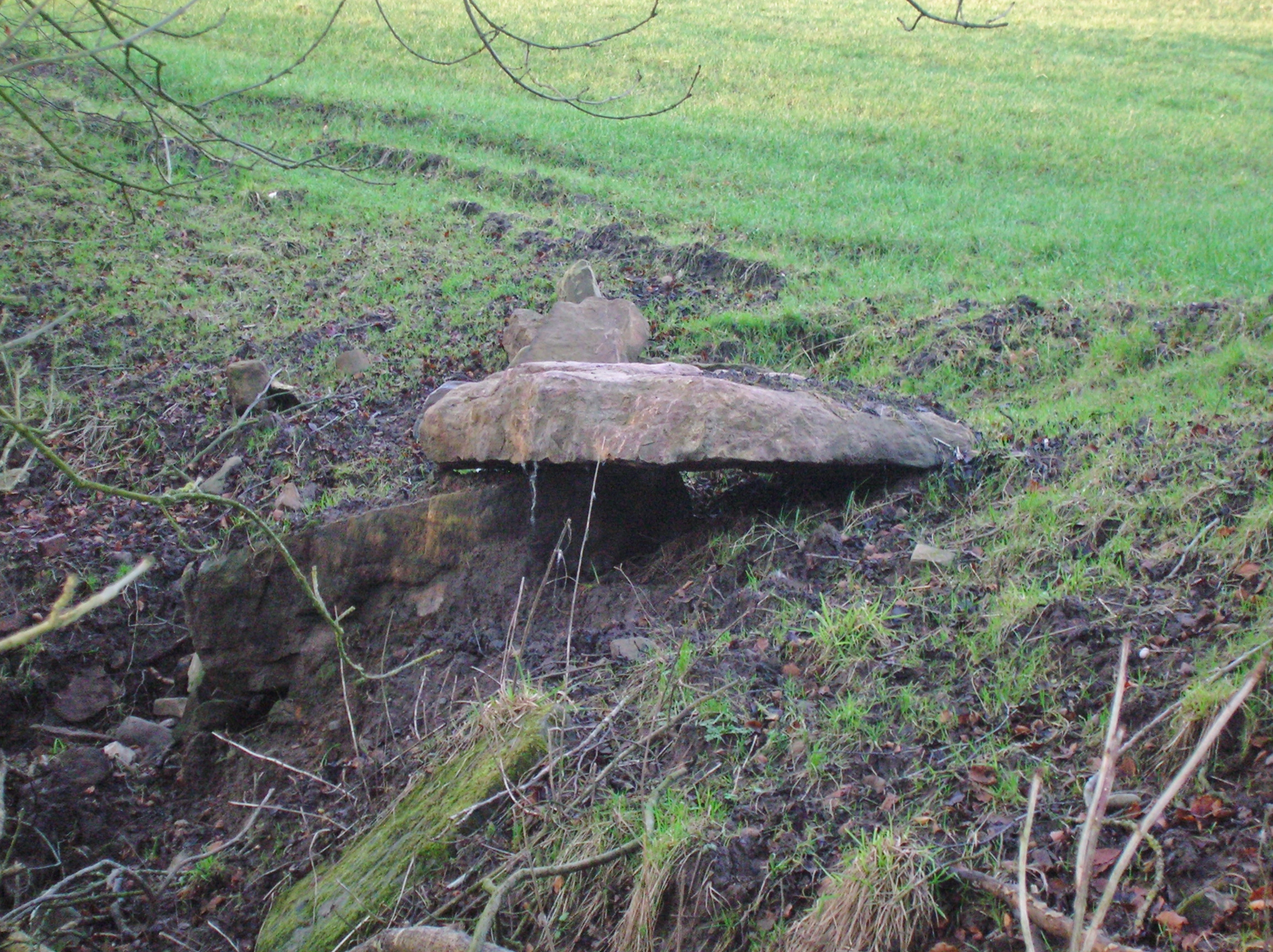
Remains of the old Whitehill Loch Burn culvert.

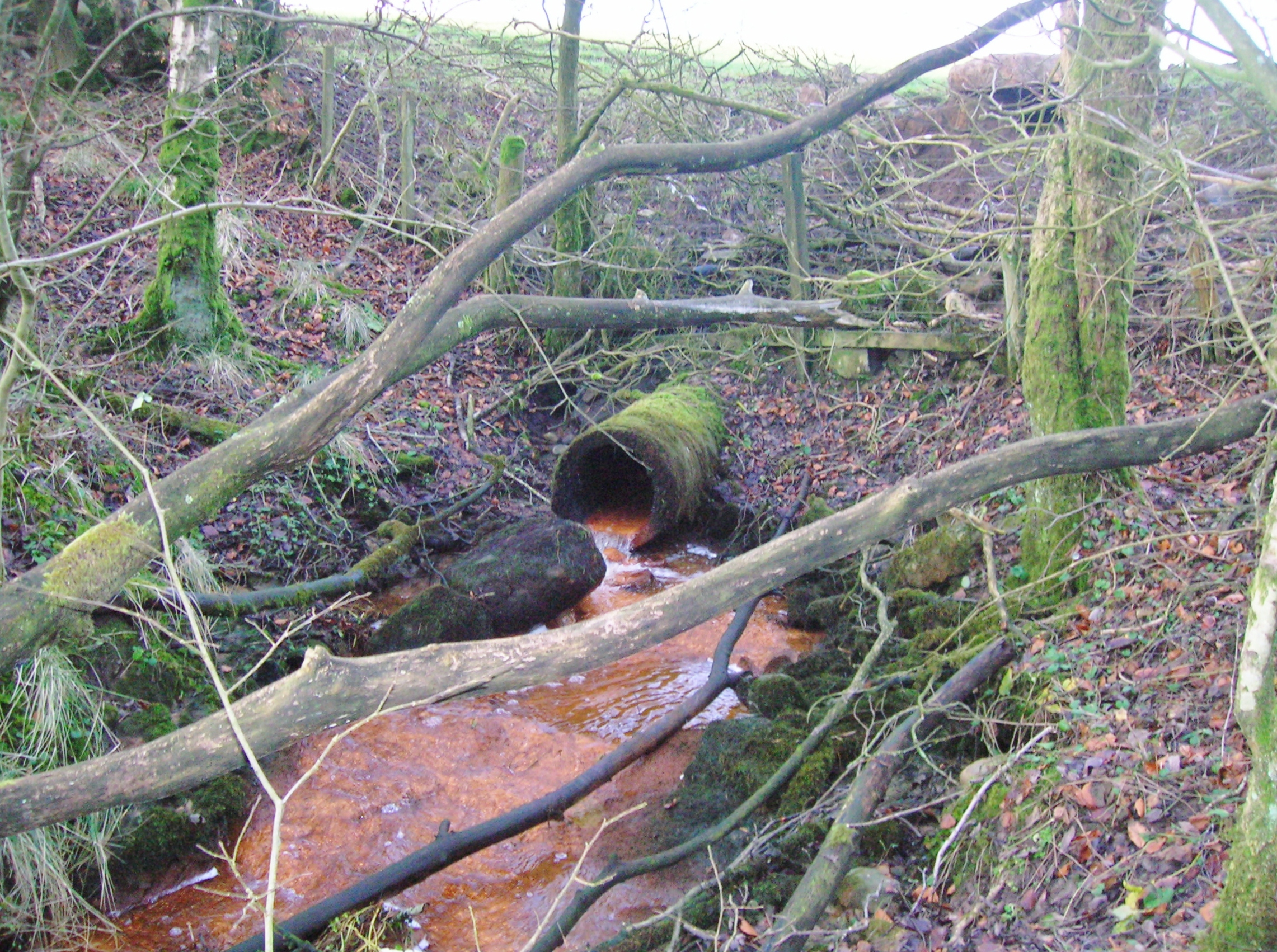
Modern drainage pipe for the Whitehill Loch Burn.

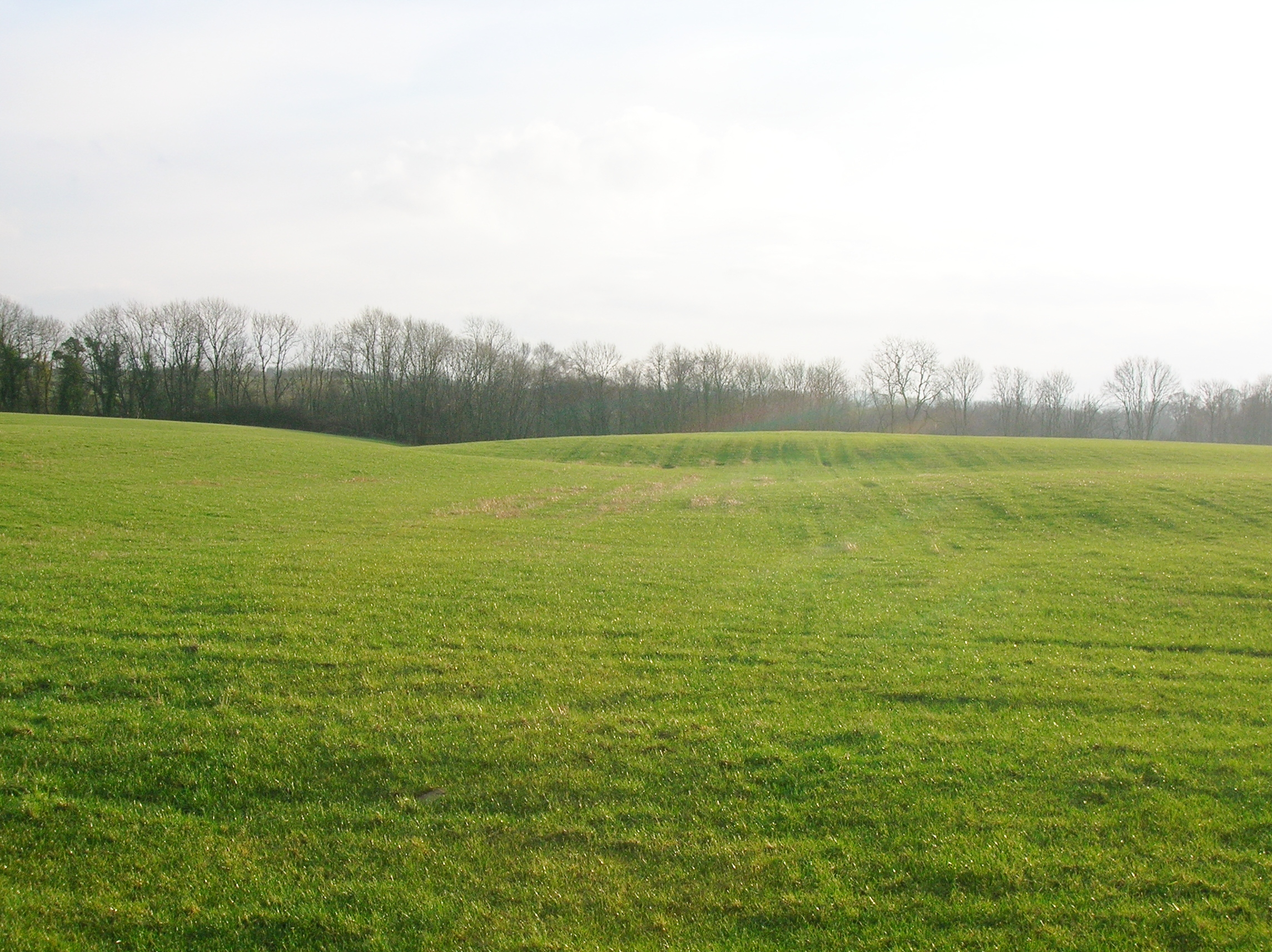
The site of the Whitehill Burn Culvert.

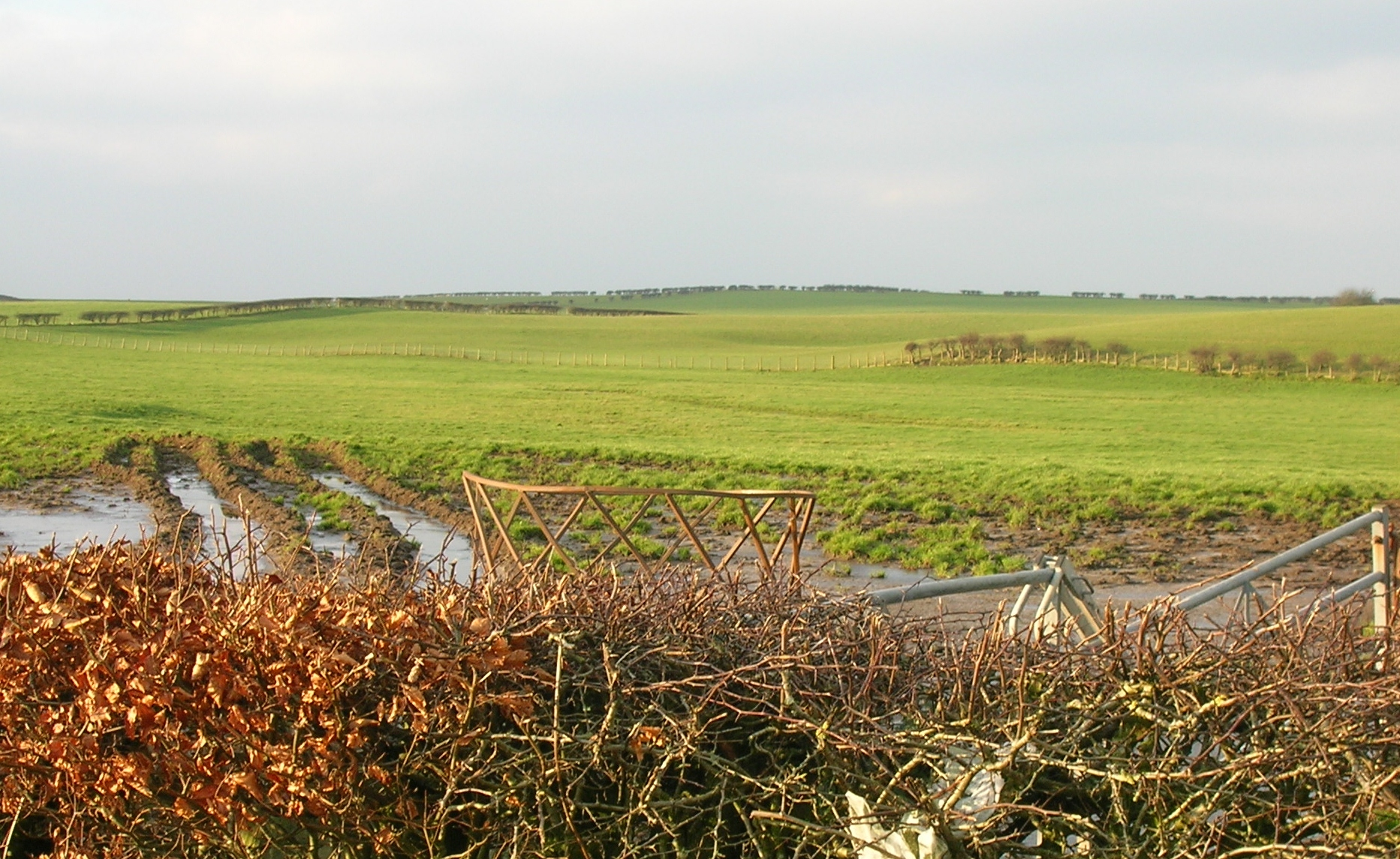
The site of Whitehill Loch looking north.

== See also ==
- Bruntwood Loch
- Loch Gate
- Loch Brown
