= Bruntwood Loch =

Former lake in Ayrshire, Scotland

Coordinates: 55°33′41.5″N 4°22′32.2″W

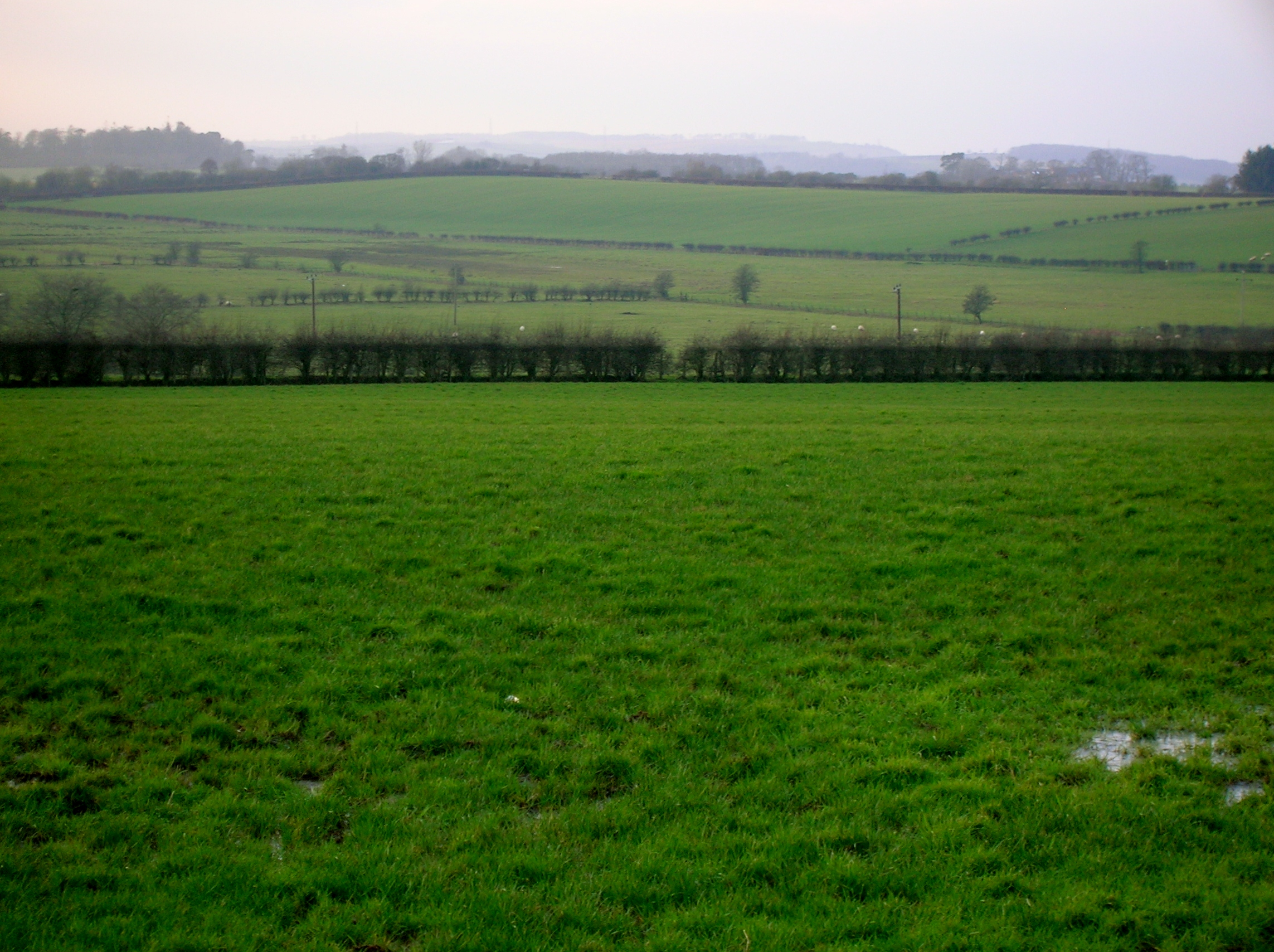
- Site of Bruntwood Loch

- The location of Bruntwood Loch, East Ayrshire
- Location: East Ayrshire, Scotland
- Type: Freshwater loch
- Primary inflows: The Middleyard and Blacks Burns, rainfall and runoff
- Primary outflows: Little Sorn Burn
- Basin countries: Scotland
- Settlements: Mauchline

Bruntwood Loch (NS 50265 32454) was a freshwater loch, now drained, lying in a glacial kettle hole in Galston, East Ayrshire, Scotland.

== The loch ==
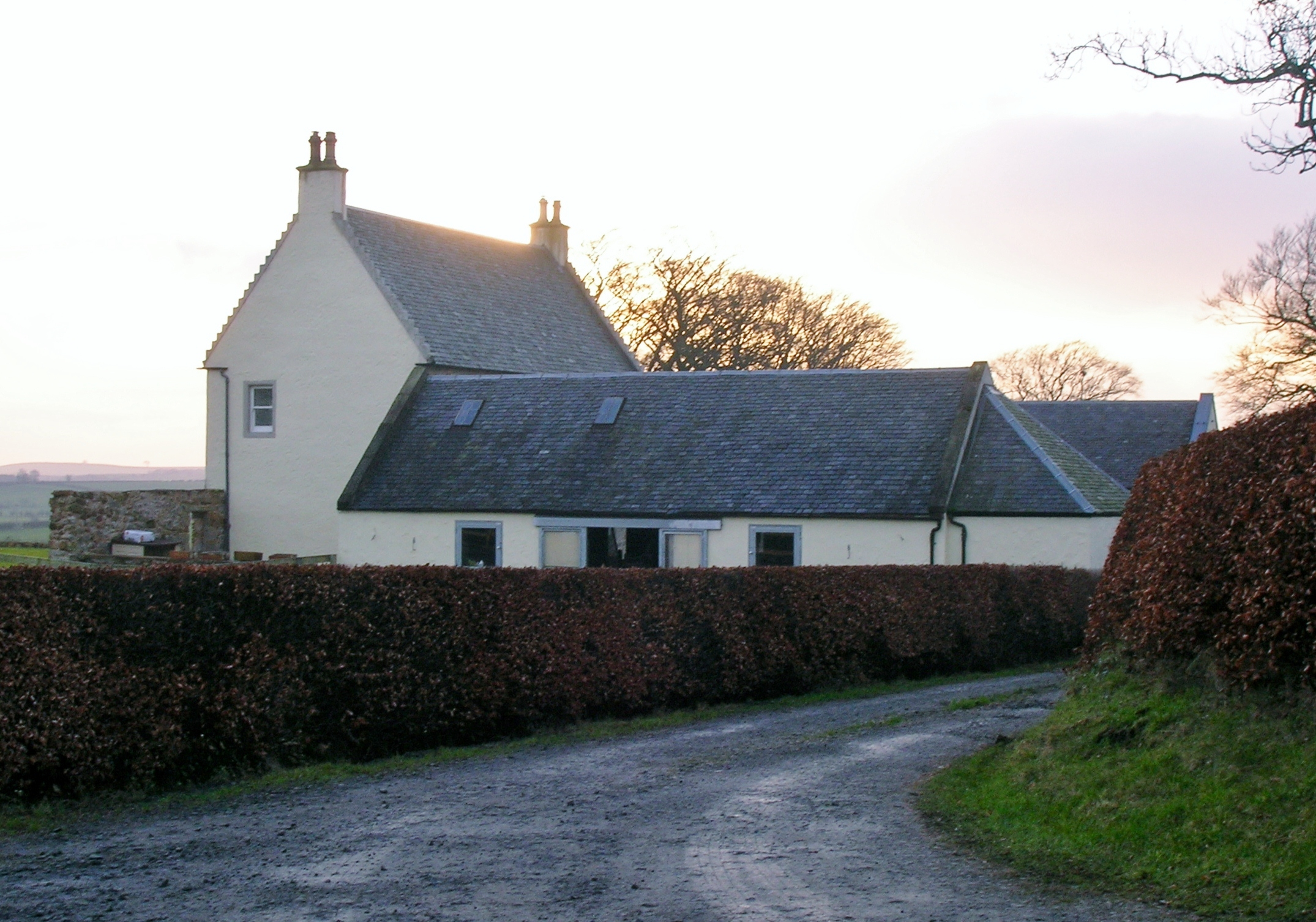
Bruntwood House

Bruntwood Loch, in the south-western extremity of Galston Parish, had been completely drained by 1882-1885.

Wildlife

In the 'Birds of Ayrshire and Wigton' of 1869, the Eurasian bittern (Botaurus stellaris) is recorded to have once bred at Bruntwood Loch. The 1861 OS Gazetteer refers to it as a quondam loch, meaning former loch, having once been much frequented by waterfowl, but now completely under the plough.

== The Lairds ==
In 1406 Dame Joanna de Keith grants 'Bryntwood' (sic) to her son Andree de Hamylton. The Lords of Council in 1491 decreed that Alexander Hamilton of Bruntwood should pay Alan Lord Cathcart ten Scot pound, owed to said Alan. The King consented in 1485 to a charter granting 'Birnwood' to Alexander Hamilton, armiger, and to Marjorie Lindsay his wife.

It is recorded in 1565 that James Hamilton of Fynnart, Knt., was the father of James Hamilton of Crawfordjohn (whose wife was Dame Helen Cunningham); land had reverted to Henry Lord Methven and to Margaret, Queen of Scotland; then from the Queen to James V; Crawfordjohn then redeems them. The lands included the "2 marcat. land of Bruntwood, with mills, tennements, and fishing".

The King consented in 1608 to a charter granting to George Campbell of Cesnock and Agnes Cunningham his wife, the "2 mercatarum of Bruntwode in the parish of Riccardton (sic)". James Hamilton of Evendaill was the grantor. The King in 1611 granted James, Duke of Hamilton, "2 mercat. de Bruntwode, cum molendinis, tenentibus:..etc.." in the Bailliary of Kyle Stewart. In 1618 the King grants George and Hugh Campbell "...2 mercatas land of Bruntwood in parish of Ricartoun..." belonging to James, son and heir apparent of James Hamilton of Evendaill; Margaret Cunningham was his future wife.

In 1620, Margaret Campbell, oldest daughter of deceased George Campbell, Master of Lowdown, and spouse of Lord John Campbell, oldest son of James Campbell of Laweris, Knt. was granted "land of Bruntwood with tenements, 40 sol. land of Auchinruglen, 20 sol. of Sorne, 10 sol. of Sornehill with mill.." These lands were resigned by Hugh, Lord of Loudoun, and the King granted anew, incorporating these lands in the free Barony of Wester Loudoun, the manor place of Wester Loudoun being the principal place or caput, these arrangements to go into effect after the death of Hugh Lowdown.

William Muir of Bruntwood was the uncle of Robert Montgomerie of Bogston near Beith. William's eldest daughter, Elizabeth, married Robert and had eighteen children, of whom only three reached adulthood.

=== Cartographic evidence ===
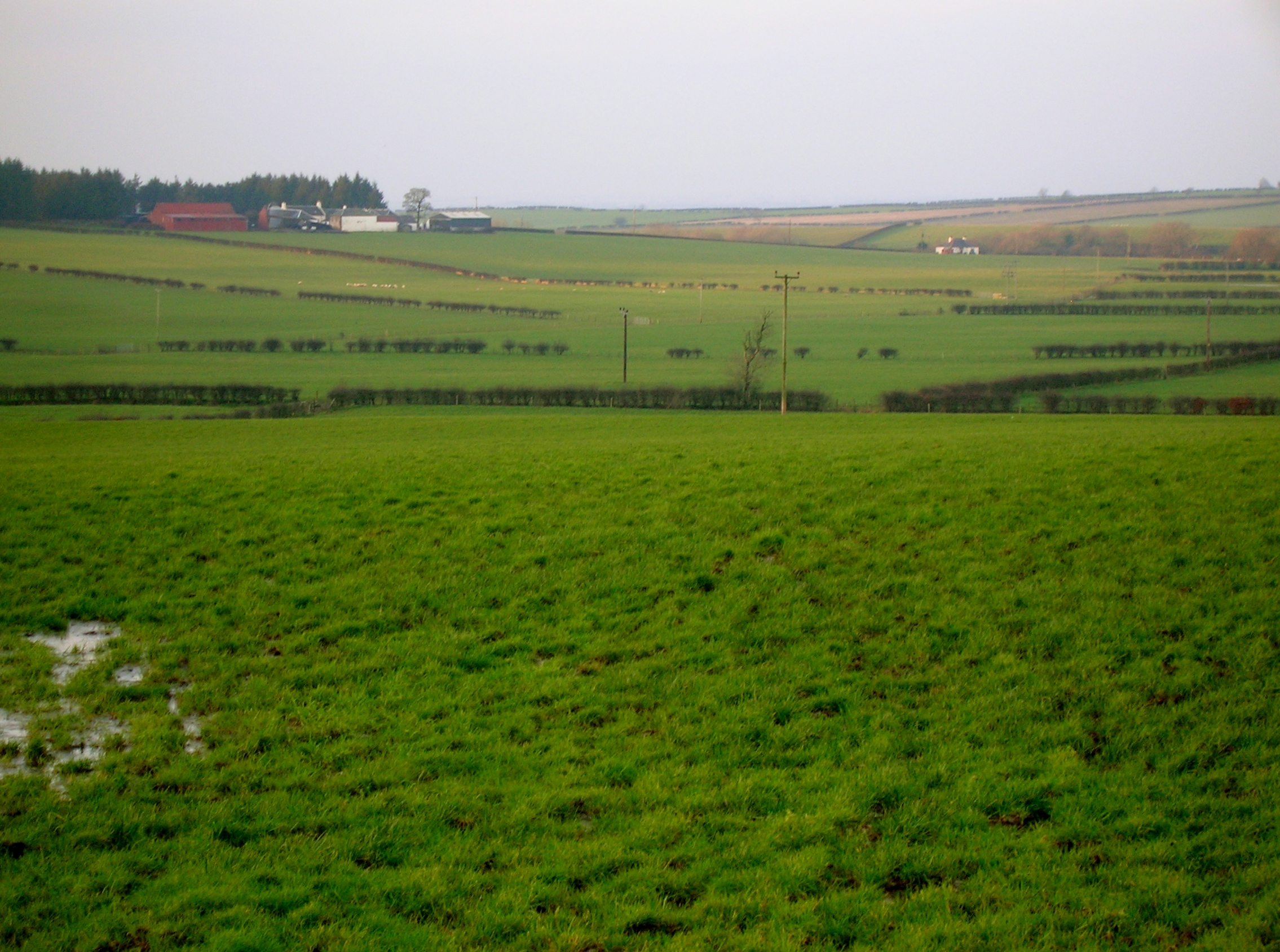
Site of Bruntwood Loch with Rigghead Farm

Blaeu's map of 1654 from the original by Timothy Pont of circa 1604, shows the loch clearly, the dwelling of Lochend and Bruntwood, with a single inflow. Roys map of 1747 shows ploughed fields, records Lochend and shows the toll road that ran from Mauchline to Galston at the western boundary of the loch. Armstrongs 1775 map shows the loch, with two inflows, and the estate policies of Bruntwood on the lochshore, showing that the loch was an integral part of the designed landscape. Ainslie's map of 1821 shows the loch, a single inflow and the dwelling of Lochend. Thomson's map of 1832 does not show the loch. The 1908 OS map no longer shows Lochend and indicates a deep drainage ditch at the site of the loch itself. The loch was overlooked by Bruntwoodhill Farm, Bruntwood Mains Farm, and Bruntwood House, with Little Sorn on the route of the outflow. The 1895 6" OS map shows a deep drainage ditch below Bruntwood Mains, draining the waters of the old loch.

== Archaeology ==
A stone whorl was found in the earth above the rock of Cowgrove Quarry. Two other whorls and two polished stone axes were found in the locality.

== Micro-history ==
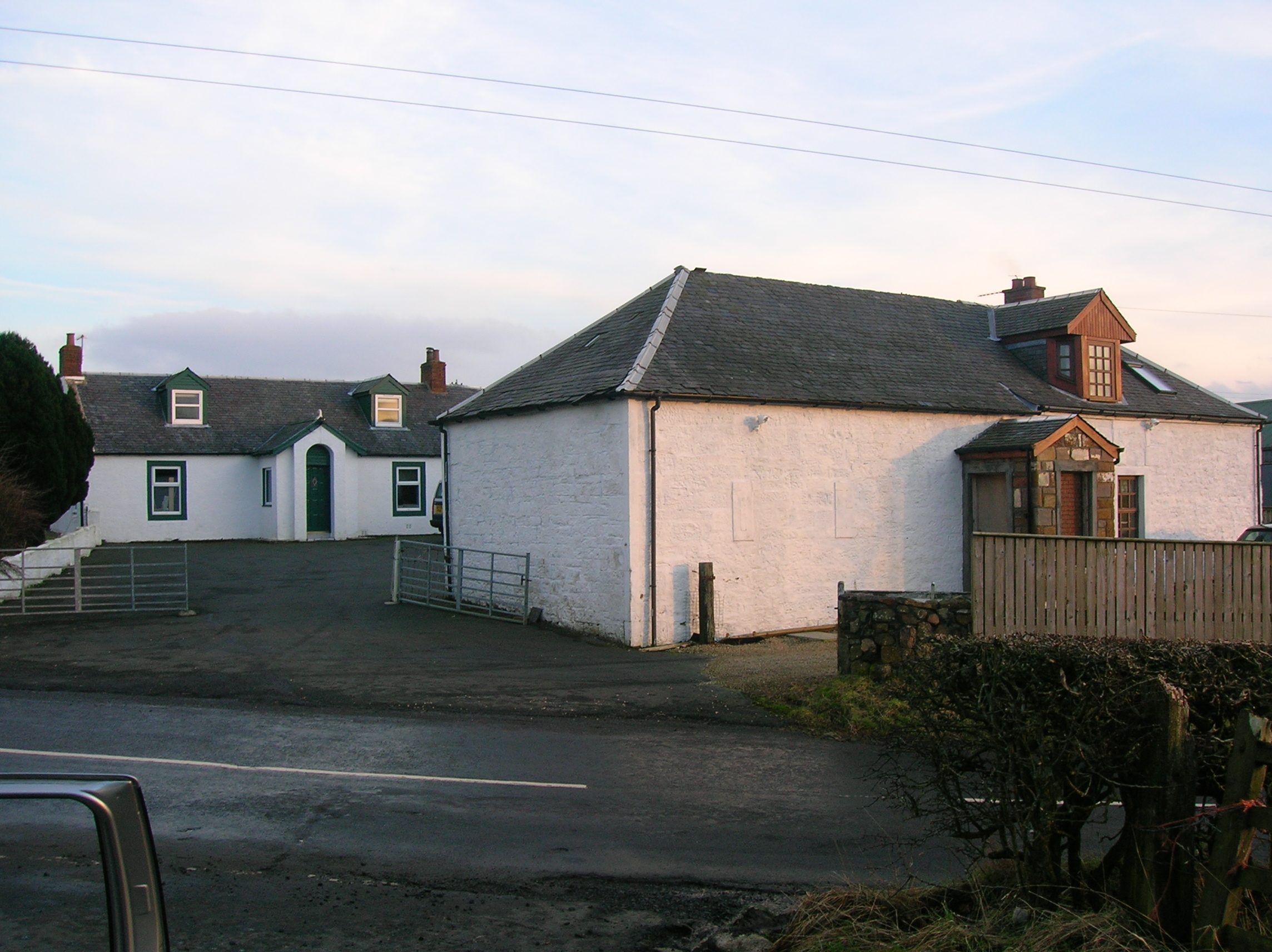
Little Sorn smallhoding near the burn of that name

The National Archives of Scotland hold records show that coal mines ran beneath the farm and lands of Bruntwood.

Marl, a lime rich material was often present in the bottom of lochs and was a valuable fertilizer.

Bruntwood House was a lairds dwelling and until the late eighteenth century the family of Moor or Muir were the owners. The family coat of arms is still to be seen above the front doorway of the 'B' Listed house.

== See also ==
- Loch Brown
- Loch Gate
- Whitehill Loch
