= Loch Brown =

Coordinates: 55°32′37.5″N 4°24′31.6″W

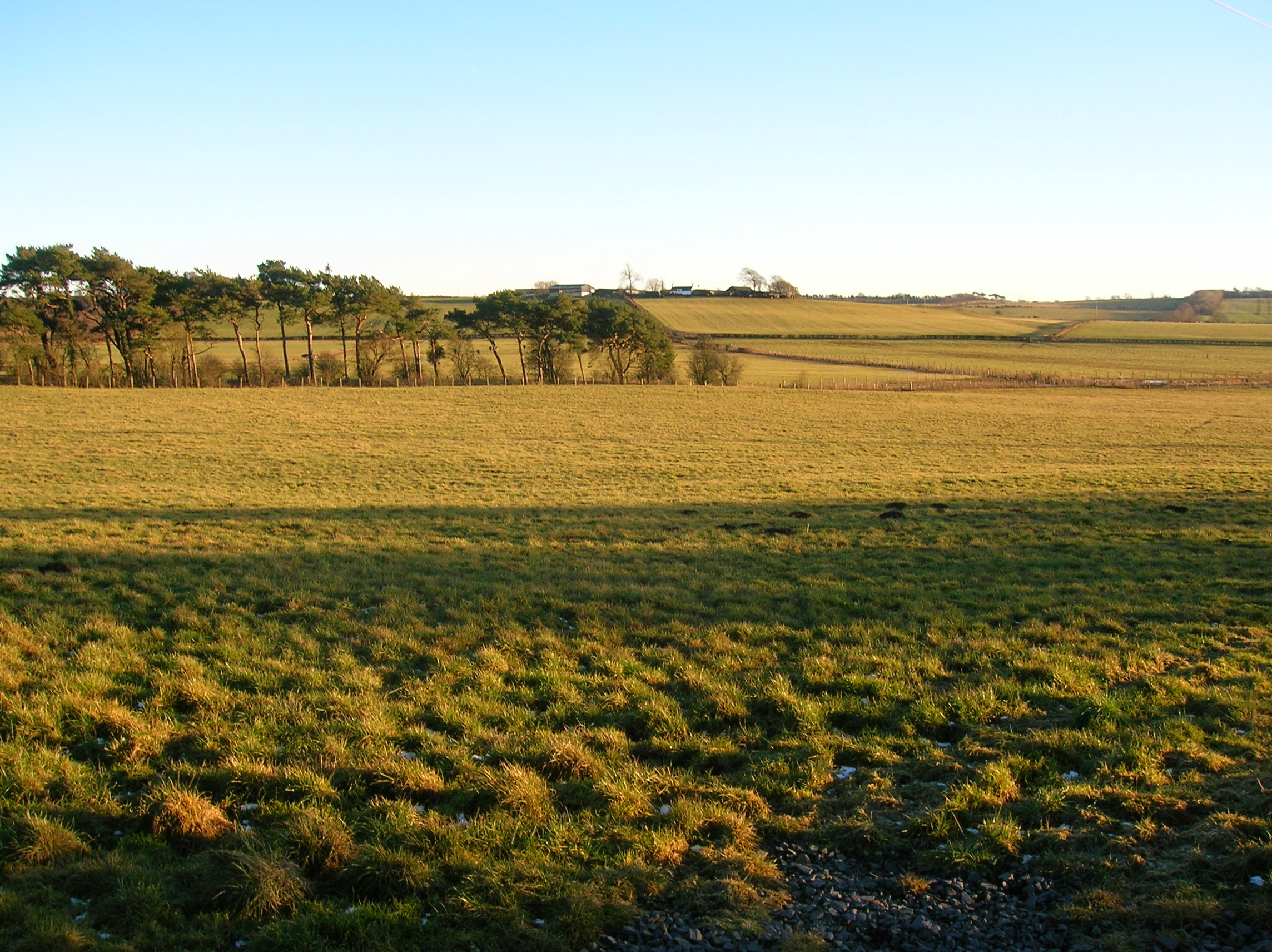
- The site of Loch Brown

- Location within Scotland
- Location: Crosshands, East Ayrshire, Scotland
- Type: Drained freshwater loch
- Primary inflows: Skeoch and Mossgiel Burns
- Primary outflows: Garroch Burn
- Basin countries: Scotland
- Surface area: 50–60 acres (20–24 ha)
- Settlements: Mauchline

Loch Brown, also known in Scots as Loch Broun, Broon or Broom, was situated in a kettle hole in the mid-Ayrshire clayland near Crosshands. It is nowadays (2011) visible as a surface depression in pastureland, partially flooded, situated in a low-lying area close to farms and dwellings of Skeoch, Dalsangan, Ladebrae, Lochhill, and Crosshands, mainly in the Parish of Mauchline and partly in Craigie, East Ayrshire, Scotland. Duveloch is an old name for the loch and this may derive from the Gaelic Dubh, meaning black or dark loch.

The loch was natural, sitting in a hollow created by glaciation. The loch waters drained via the Garroch Burn that flows into the Cessnock Water and thence into the River Irvine. The road from Tarbolton to Galston via the old Largie Toll (B744) passes close to the loch site, and close by stands the hamlet of Crosshands on the Carlisle Road (A76).

== History ==
Robert Gordon's (1580-1661) map shows the loch and two inflows and Jan Jansen's 1659 map shows the loch clearly. Roy's map of 1747-55 clearly marks the loch and the nearby mill, the Garroch Burn running into the Cessnock Water close to Carnell Castle.

Loch Brown was referred to in the first statistical account (1791 - 1799) of Mauchline Parish by Rev Auld (Burns' Daddy Auld) as follows:

"The only loch in the parish, called Loch Brown is about three miles North West from Mauchline. Wild ducks, geese. and sometimes swans resort to it. It covers about 60 acres of ground and would have been drained many years ago, had it not been for the sake of two corn mills which it supplies with water" In 1845 the Rev Tod refers to the loch as being of 60 acres and only surviving as a source of water for two corn mills.

When the mainline railway was extended beyond Kilmarnock in the direction of Dumfries the Railway Company route of choice lay across the loch, and then continued through the Mossgiel or Skeoch Tunnel to Mauchline. The loch lay seven miles from Kilmarnock in a basin lying north of Mossgiel Farm. The neighbouring proprietors at the time were the Duchess of Portland, Mr Claud Alexander of Ballochmyle, and Mr George Douglas. The first train which passed over the drained loch was in 1848, and the schoolmaster at Crosshands took his pupils down to Laidside to see it pass.

The loch was some roughly circular, 50-60 acres in extent, but swampy land stretched right up the valley into the farm of Skeoch, and into the lands of Mossgiel. The burns which meandered through this bog land came directly from Mossgiel and Skeoch. This marshy land was dominated by reeds, rushes, willows and alder scrub; it was home to water fowl, frequented by poachers, and guarded by estate game keepers. The loch and its swamp was a favourite spot for Kilmarnock sportsmen, and it used to be local tradition that Tam Samson, a friend of Robert Burns, made it a rendezvous.

=== The draining of Loch Brown ===
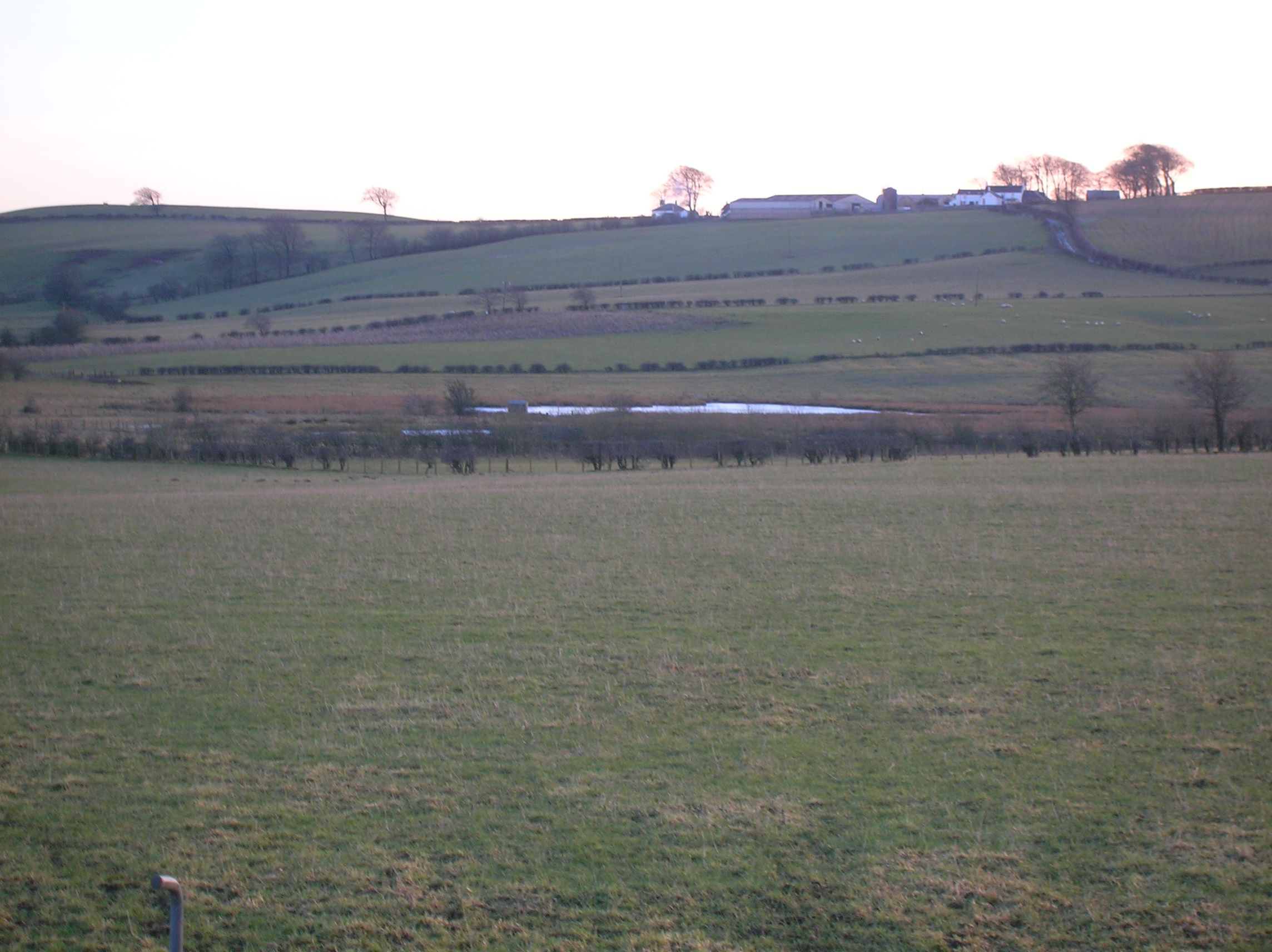
Loch Brown remnant below Skeoch Farm.

The outflow was into the Garroch Burn, which flowed as a deep and canalised lade towards the old hamlet or clachan of Ladeside, powering the wheel of the mills at Dalsangan. When the railway company drained the loch, by a deep cutting, they compensated the miller at Dalsangan meal mill to the sum of £400 and the mill became an extensive farm. The loch itself did not completely disappear as the bottom was very uneven, leaving deep puddles full of fish; people used to tell of the “catches” and the fish diet that was in every house at the time. The railway filled the holes up; the ground was thus levelled to a certain extent, and it eventually became a rich meadow land bearing grass and other crops.

The farmers found the old loch's land to be very rich, and proprietors rented it at then high price of £2 per acre. Marl, a lime rich material was often present in the bottom of lochs and was a valuable fertilizer. The land in the 1930s were still formed of a black, loamy nature. The shores of the loch are still indicated when the ground is ploughed by the presence of sand on one side and gravely stones on the other. If a deep hole is dug, the ground is found to be dark humus to a great depth. Nuts, leaves, twigs, and the like were still turned up in the 1930s as they were 100 or 200 years ago, but exposure made them rot quickly into black mould. The marsh and its reeds and wildfowl inevitably disappeared, and rich meadow land took the place of the once extensive wetlands.

=== Curling ===
Loch Brown was a favourite place for curling matches in winter, and the “roaring” game was played here until the early 1900s. It is on record that on one occasion a wagonette of curlers from Kilmarnock drove onto the ice. The horses had to be removed and taken to the smithy to be “sharped” to give them a grip on the ice, but in the meantime, the wheels of the wagonette sunk into the ice deeply and picks and crowbars had to be used to get the vehicle out.

Previous location of Halket Loch, East Ayrshire

=== Ladeside ===
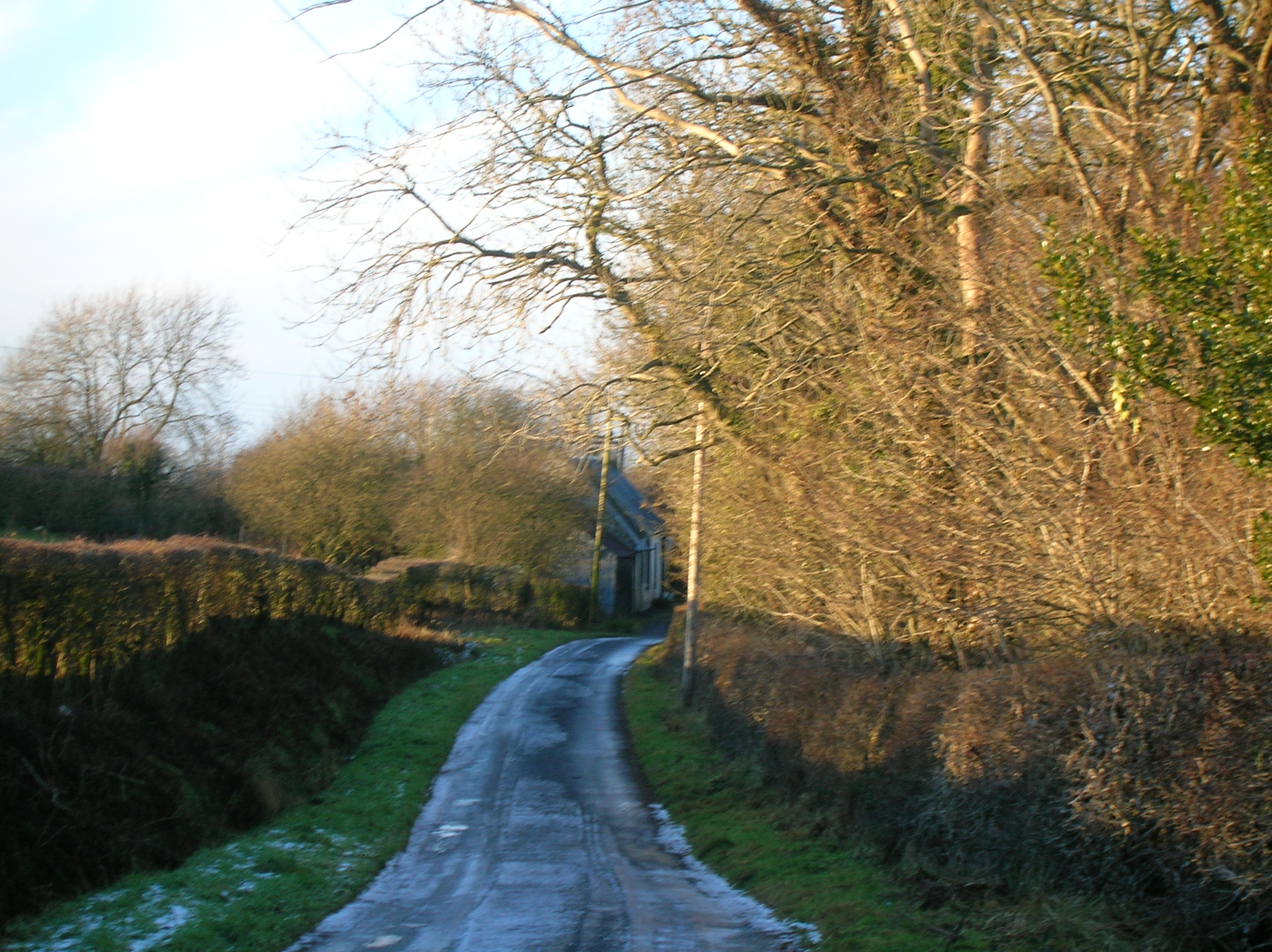
The line of the lade near Ladebrae Cottage.

This hamlet stood close to Dalsangan Mill and practically vanished because the railway was built through its centre and several dwellings were demolished. The mill was worked by Hugh Morton in 1841 and was out of use by 1860, prompted by the Garroch Burn never having much of a head of water or force of flow.

An old name for Ladeside was Machine Cross. This name may be derived from the presence of a smithy that once existed here and the various 'machines' which were associated with this, however a corruption of 'Mauchline' is more likely. The hamlet was home to around a dozen families, including the Lambies, Stirlings, Kennedys, Wallaces, Robbs, Manns, and Smiths A flax mill was also present here at one time. The smithy was moved to Crosshands and the building still survives. A school existed at Crosshands.

==== Coal mining ====
Ladeside may have been a place of great age for workmen laying a waterpipe along the present roadway discovered an old pit shaft with stone built walls, in very good condition. The depth when the pit was opened up was around seventy feet, and the old pit bing made a noticeable slope in the roadway. The monks of Fail Monastery were reputed to have mined coal more or less on the outskirts of their lands and this could have been one of their ancient workings. The clachan appears on early maps of the area.

=== The roads ===
A lane at one time came from Carnell Castle (previously Cairnhill), circled round and through Ladeside clachan, and then proceeded directly to the main road from Kilmarnock to Mauchline; the A76 Carlisle Road. The road now passes by the present Laidside, a smallholding and the only house left of the old hamlet, alongside the cutting in which the burn now runs, to join the Galston Road that passes through Crosshands. Before the war, a large plantation of tall trees hid Crosshands from view; this has now been largely felled.

=== The Robert Burns connection ===
Tam Samson used to shoot over the marsh land around Loch Brown and in those days this stretched almost up to Mossgiel Farm, Burns's home at the time. Burns would have to pass near the loch when he went to market at Kilmarnock, but is not known to have referred directly to it. Thomas Samson was a Kilmarnock friend of Burns, he was a seedsman of good credit, a zealous sportsman, and a good fellow.

== See also ==
- Lochlea, South Ayrshire - a nearby loch site
- Bruntwood Loch - a nearby former loch
