= St Robert's Cave and Chapel of the Holy Cross =

Medieval hermitage in Knaresborough, England

St Robert's Cave and the Chapel of the Holy Cross
- St Robert's Chapel and the Chapel of the Holy Rood
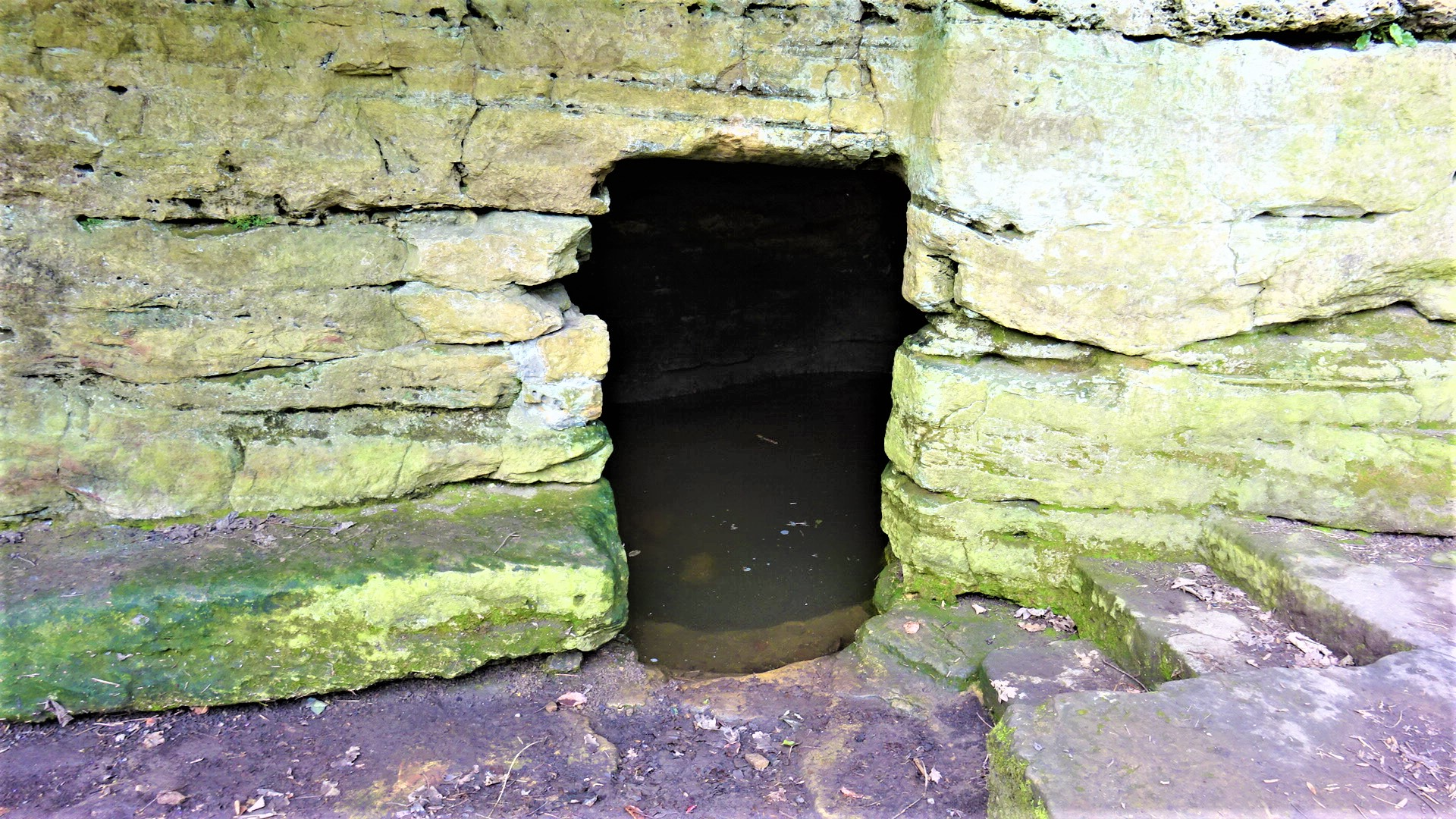
- The entrance to St Robert's Cave
- Interactive map of St Robert's Cave and the Chapel of the Holy Cross
- Location: Knaresborough, North Yorkshire
- OS grid: SE351564
- Coordinates: 53°59′59″N 1°27′03″W
- Entrances: 1
- Hazards: Caution required.
- Access: By a steps and a path

The early 13th century St Robert's Cave and Chapel of the Holy Cross, also known with variants such as St Robert's Chapel and Chapel of the Holy Rood, are located on Abbey Road beside the River Nidd in its gorge at Knaresborough. Once inhabited by Robert of Knaresborough, the cave is a rare example of a medieval hermitage cut out of the magnesian limestone river gorge with a domestic area externally and the chapel of the Holy Cross which originally housed the saint's grave.

The trustees of the site are the monks of Ampleforth Abbey and in 1989 the Harrogate Museums Service carried out excavations after clearing the site.

== Robert of Knaresborough ==
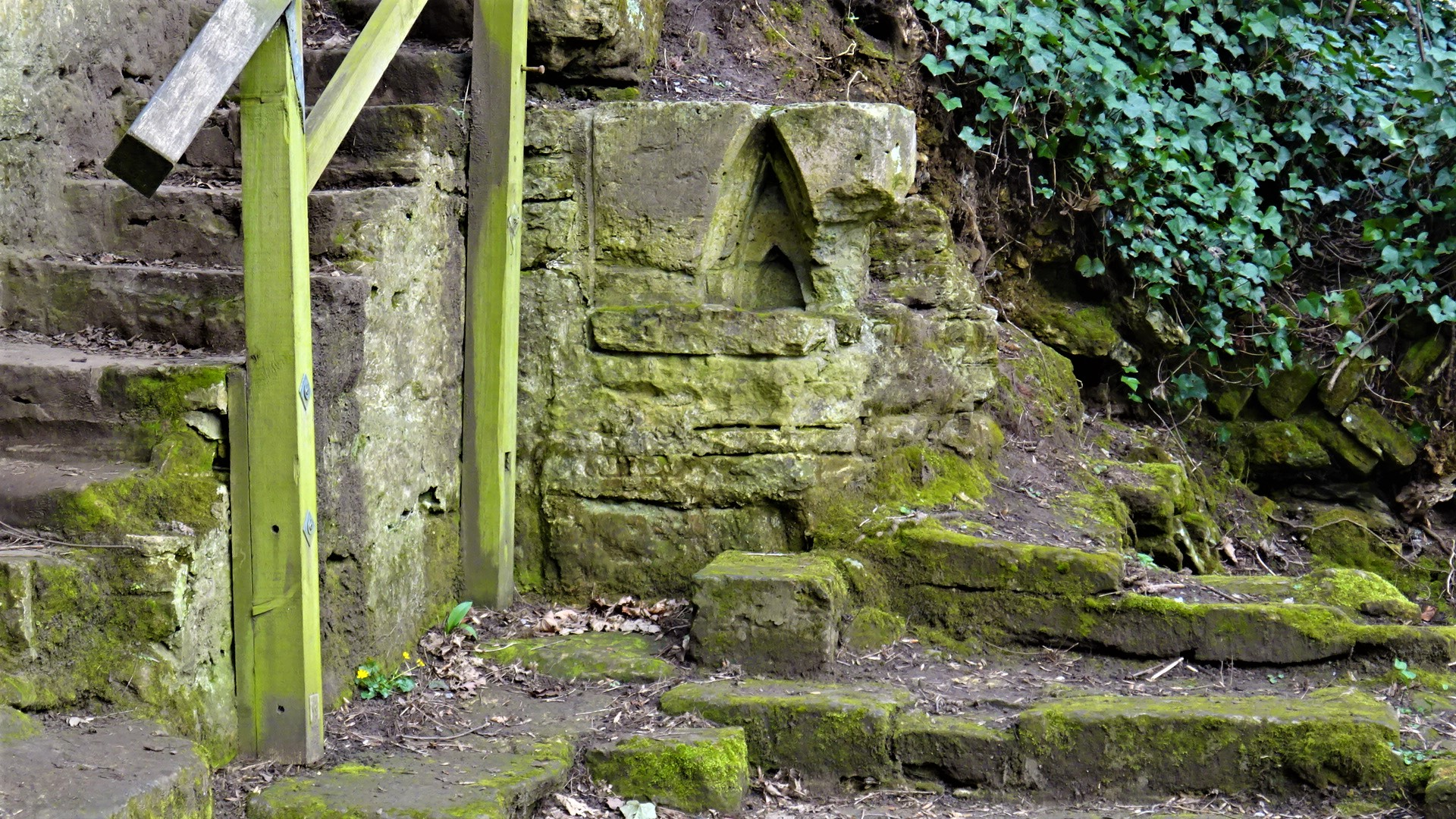
The Holy Cross Chapel ruins.

Robert of Knaresborough was born Robert Flower or Floure in York to a wealthy family. From childhood he was intent on pursuing a religious vocation and after a short time in a formal abbey setting he became a hermit and lived for much of his life in a cave beside the River Nidd in Knaresborough. Never officially canonized, in 1252 Robert was implicitly recognised as a saint by the Catholic church. For consistency Robert Flower is referred to as 'St Robert'.

St Robert died on 24 September 1218, at first being buried in the chapel, however his body was later moved to the Trinitarian Priory in Abbey Road.

== The Hermitage and chapel ==
Around 500 hermitages are recorded however the locations of very few are known. St Robert's Cave is a very rare surviving example of a medieval hermitage, that includes a living area. The assemblage of St Robert's Cave and the Chapel of the Holy Cross is unique.

== History ==
William de Stuteville, the Constable of Knaresborough Castle granted St Robert the piece of land on which the cave and chapel were built. King John is said to have visited St Robert at the cave and in 1216 granted him 40 acres of land. The first Royal Maundy ceremony is claimed to have taken place here. The chapel, dedicated to the Holy Cross, is a Grade II Listed Building that is reached via a narrow path and steps from Abbey Road.

In 1907 the OS records the Chapel of Our Lady of the Crag erroneously as 'St Roberts Chapel'. The aforementioned chapel has been much confused with the Holy Cross Chapel and cave of Knaresborough.

=== The cave ===
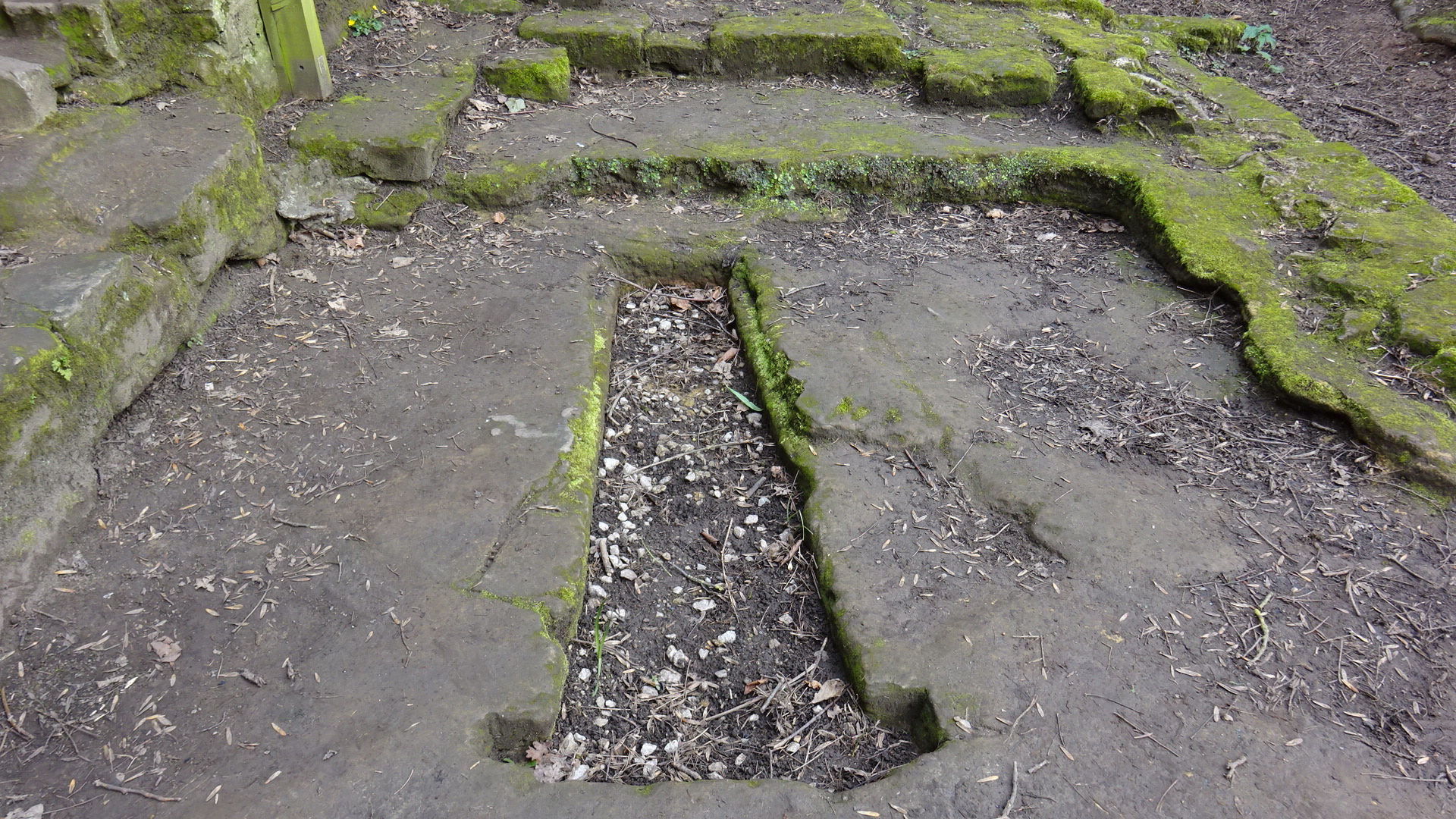
The saint's grave.

As a result of the fame of St Robert and reported miracles the cave and chapel were a very popular site of pilgrimage prior to the Reformation. Saint Giles' Chapel or priory is a name also associated with the cave.

A rock-cut bench and a set of steps in the domestic area have the cave entrance located between with further steps giving access to the rock cut floor of the cave. The bench outside is cut back into the rock face and is sheltered by the cliff above. The cave has effectively two sections, a domestic one and one for religious use. An alcove and bench have been cut into the back of the second chamber. The caves basic `L' shaped chamber is nearly 4m long east-west by 3m north-south at its widest, the second forming St Robert's living area. The cave's walls and ceiling (2.2m high) carry many carved niches and initials. One possibly 12th century incised cross with bored terminals exists. Clear tooling marks are present showing that the cave is not entirely natural in origin and it is recorded that the saint himself worked at enlarging the cave.

The associated chapel and in particular the cave have long been prone to flooding from the River Nidd despite the presence of an ancient drain that cuts across the site.

The use of the cave following the Reformation is not recorded however the various hollows in the cliff wall suggest that lean to structures were present at one time as the nearby Chapel of Our Lady of the Crag site.

=== The Chapel of the Holy Cross ===
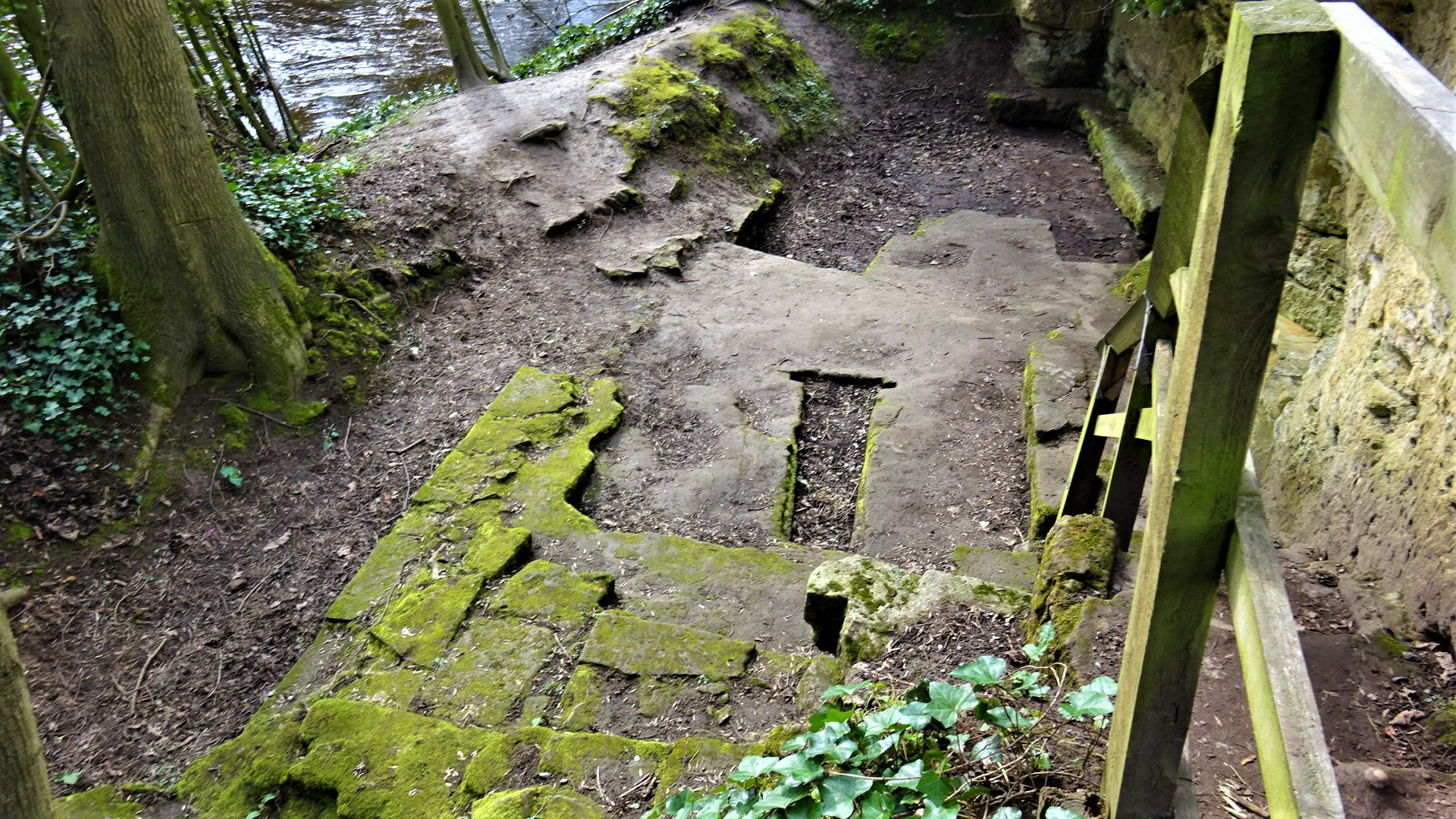
St Robert's grave and chapel

The brother of St Robert was Walter Flower, Mayor of York. To improve the facilities for his famous brother he paid for stonemasons to be employed to build a shelter where St Robert could meet with the poor and pilgrims as well as a chapel dedicated to the Holy Cross or Holy Rood.

No features survive that provide clear datable evidence. The foundations of the rectangular chapel of the Holy Cross building has a prominent grave recess cut out of it in front of the chapel's former altar. The grave, 2m long by between 0.35m-0.53m wide, was recessed at its sides to allow for a covering slab to be laid flush with the floor level as was the fashion with important burials at that time.

A few courses of worked stone remain on the south and east sides, however nothing survives above ground to the west. The Trinitarian Order who acquired the chapel and cave, reburied St Robert at their nearby establishment, the Priory of the Holy Trinity and St Robert, which had been founded prior to 1252. The Scots sacked the priory in 1318 and it was dissolved in 1538.

== Tourist attraction ==
The cave was previously a pilgrimage site. It became a popular tourist attraction after Eugene Aram was hanged in 1759 for the murder of Daniel Clark whose remains were found in the cave. It remains open to the public.

== See also ==
- Grade II* listed churches in North Yorkshire (district)
- Listed buildings in Knaresborough
- Cleeves Cove
- Dunton Cove
- The Holy Cave, Hunterston
- Peden's Cave (Auchinbay)
- The Chapel of Our Lady of the Crag, section on St Robert, http://chapelofourladyofthecrag.btck.co.uk/StRobert.
