= Chapel of Our Lady of the Crag =

Chapel in Knaresborough, North Yorkshire, England

- Chapel of Our Lady of the Quarry
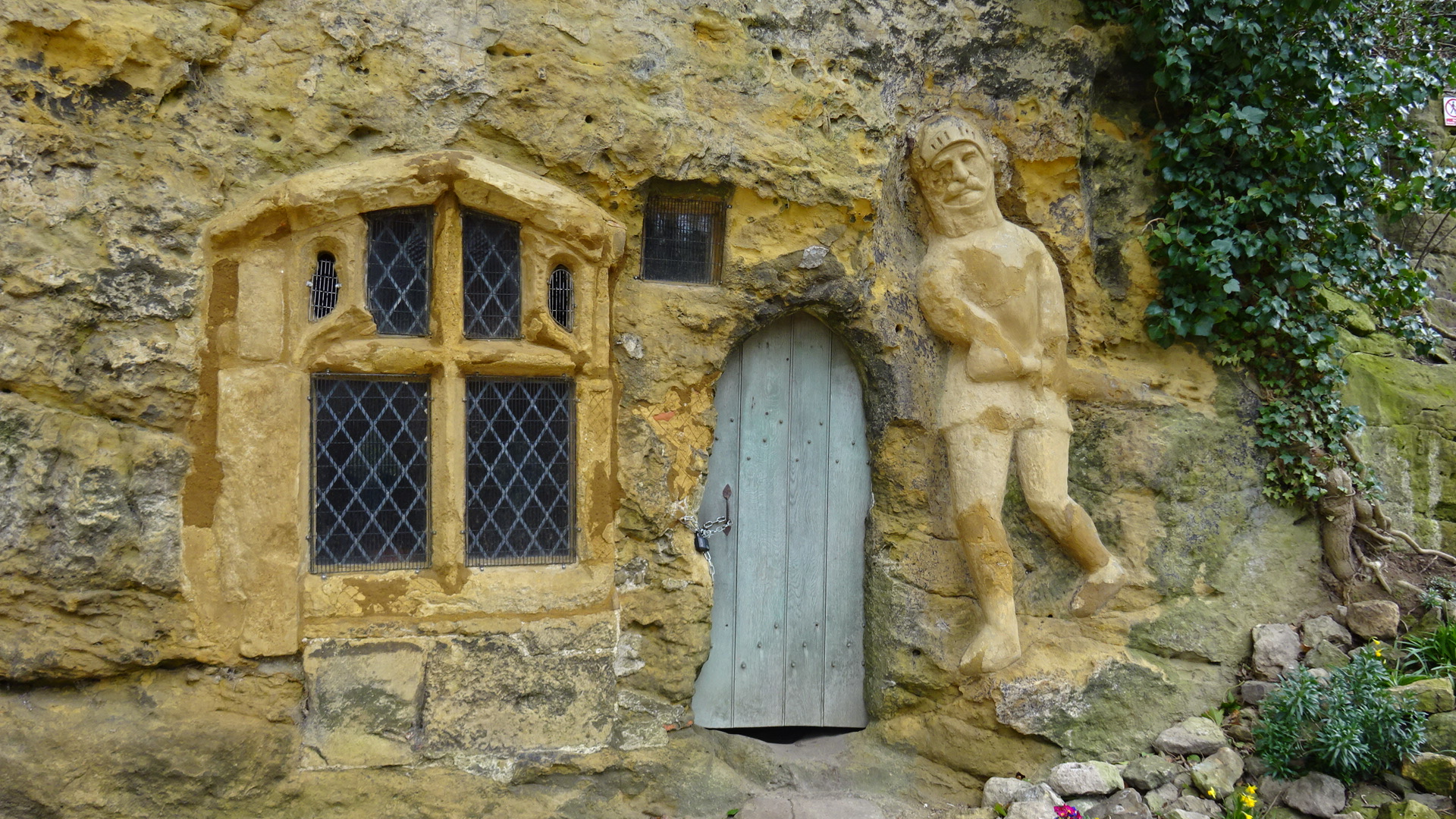
- The chapel entrance and the carved knight
- Interactive map of Chapel of Our Lady of the Crag
- Location: Knaresborough, North Yorkshire
- OS grid: SE351564
- Coordinates: 54°00′10″N 1°27′55″W
- Length: 12 ft long, 8 ft wide and 7 ft high
- Discovery: Man made
- Entrances: 1
- Difficulty: Restricted opening times
- Hazards: Caution required.
- Access: By a rough path and steps

The early-fifteenth century Chapel of Our Lady of the Crag is located in an old quarry on Abbey Road beside the Nidd Gorge at Knaresborough and is an early 15th-century-chapel cut out of the sandstone of the river gorge cliff face. It is a Marian shrine on the old pilgrim's route to the now demolished Knaresborough Priory and close to the ancient stone quarry that was used for building works at Knaresborough Castle, the parish church and elsewhere. It was also once known as Quarry Chapel or Our Lady of the Quarry.

== Cave and access ==
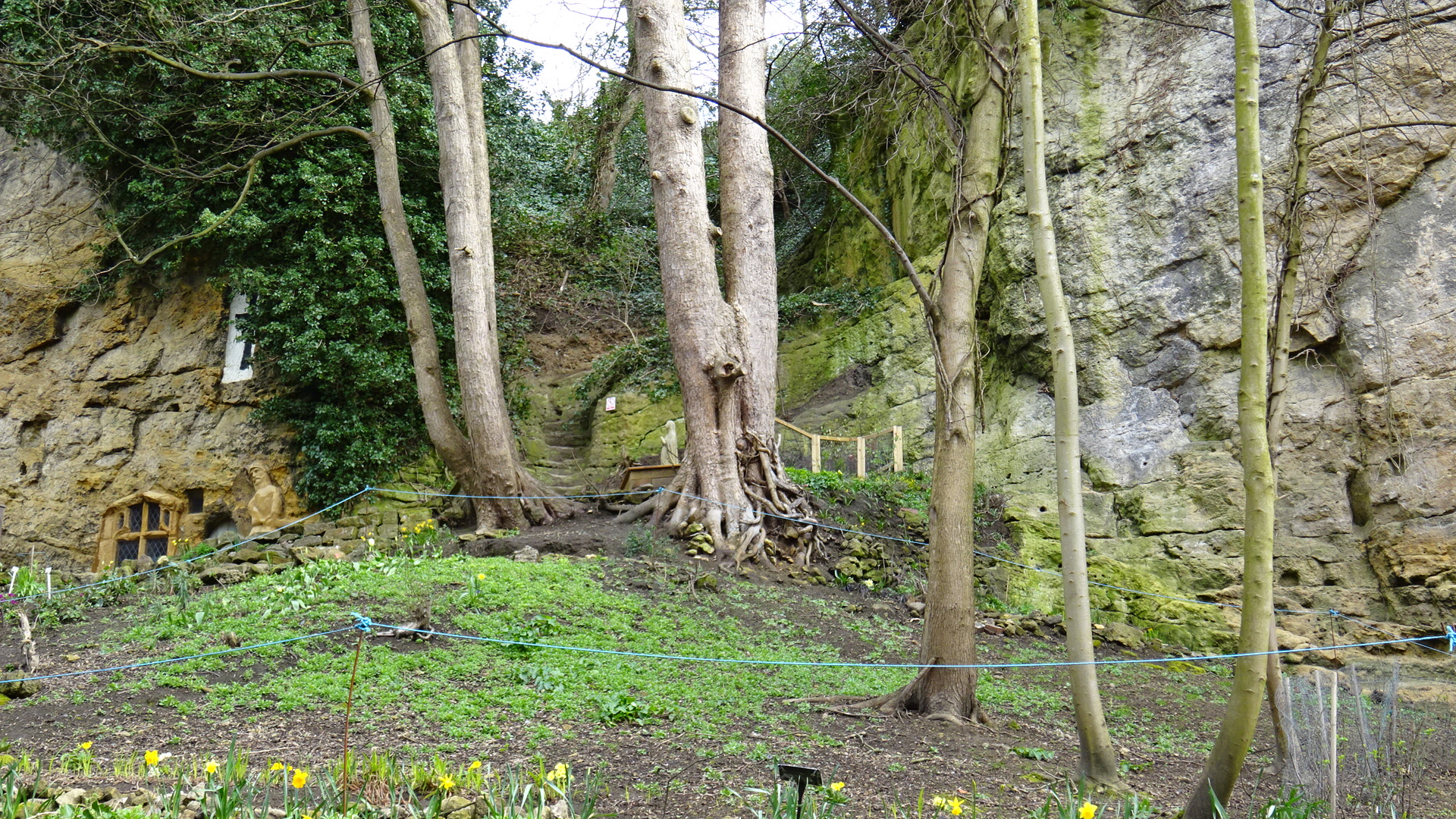
The exterior of the chapel site

The chapel, dedicated to St Mary, is a Grade I Listed Building that is reached via a narrow path and steps from Abbey Road.

The Chapel has a carved altar with a canopied niche, gargoyles, a vaulted ceiling, roof bosses, pillars with floriate capitals, a Celtic head, a piscina and externally a large carving of a medieval knight guards at the entrance. The vaulted ceiling is similar to that of Wallace's Cave at Auchinleck in Ayrshire.

The figure of the knight may be contemporary with the chapel, although Historic England dates it to between 1695 and 1739. It was certainly present in 1814 when it was mentioned by William Wordsworth. The head is separate from the body and may have been recarved in the Victorian times.

In 1907 the OS map shows a path running from the chapel to the nearby 'House in the Rock'. The steps cut into the sandstone are still present but very worn. This map records the site erroneously as 'St Roberts Chapel'.

== History ==
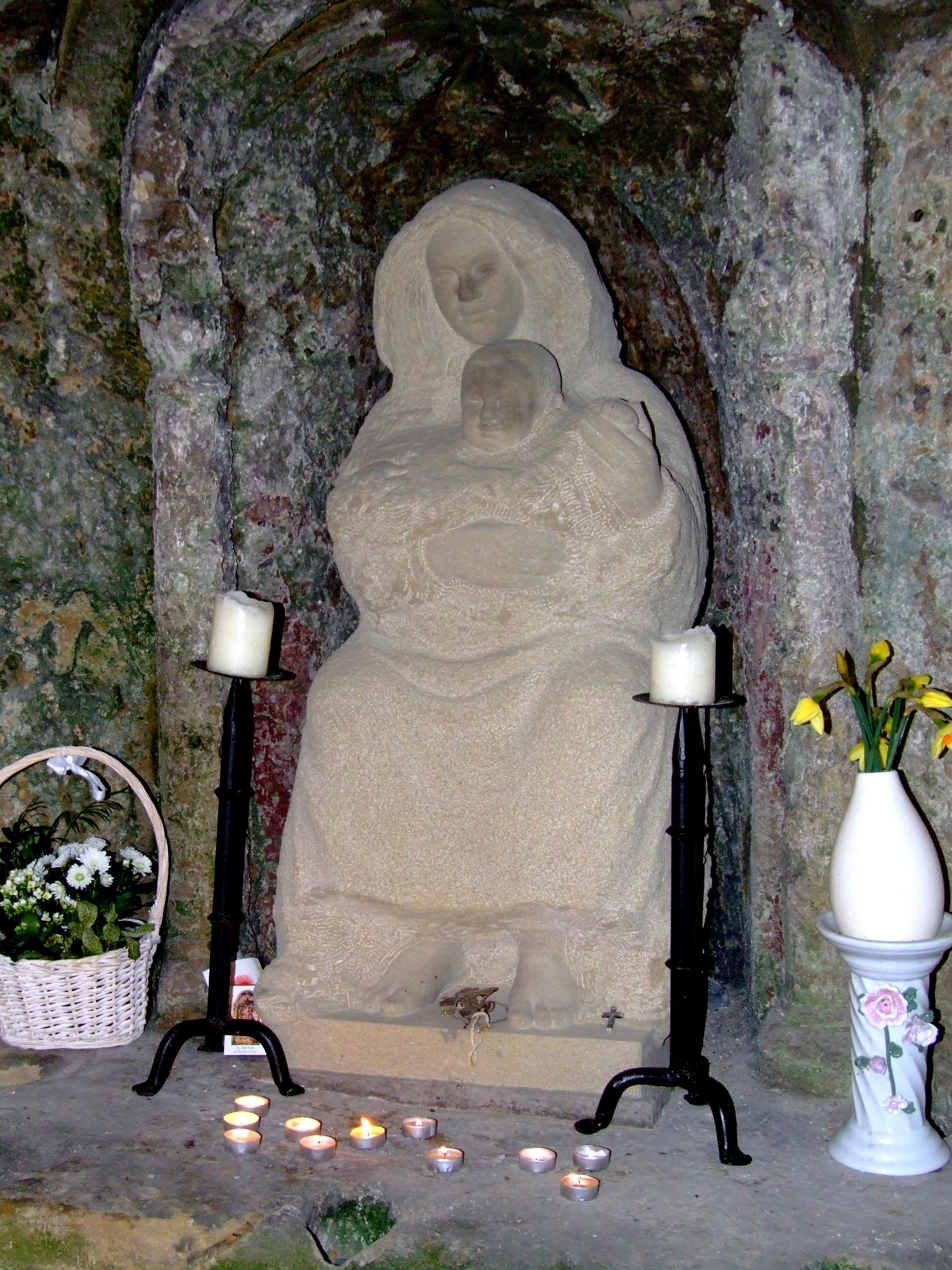
Madonna and child statue inside the chapel

This Oratory Chapel, a place for prayer, was built possibly by a master mason, known as 'John the Mason' or 'John Mason', in 1408 or 1409. The chapel was recorded in a charter of King Henry IV "John Mason received from the lord a piece of waste land below the quarry with licence to excavate there beneath the quarry in order to make and hold a chapel; which he and his assigns are to have and to hold for the term of their life for an annual rent." Various versions of the legend of its creation exist, one of which is that John the Mason was working in the nearby quarry when he saw that a rock fall was about to engulf and kill his son. Unable to reach him in time he prayed to the Virgin Mary and miraculously the stones changed direction and his son was saved. John pledged to create a chapel as thanks for the miracle.

It ceased to function as a chapel following Henry VIII's Reformation, however in 1916 it was reconsecrated as a Catholic place of worship after becoming the property of Ampleforth Abbey. Three carved heads located on the right-hand wall were taken away at this time. A new statue of Our Lady of the Crag was provided for the Chapel.

The chapel has had several mentions by travellers over the years and was visited by pilgrims between the sixteenth and seventeenth centuries. It has often been confused with the Holy Cross Chapel and cave of St Robert of Knaresborough that lie further down the River Nidd.

The crag has been the site of many rough dwellings over the centuries, such as simple shanty dwellings as evidenced by the many post holes cut into the sandstone of the cliff. The chapel cave's use is not recorded however by the end of the Victorian era the basic lean-to dwellings had been cleared away.

In 2019, the chapel was the subject of vandalism, with the glass in the medieval window frames smashed. However, the glass itself is not medieval as some media reports suggested.

=== Restoration ===
The windows have been conserved and the figure of the medieval knight restored. Internally a modern statue of Madonna and Child has been sculpted and was placed in the shrine in 2000. Since 2017 the site has been in the care of the Chapel of Our Lady of the Crag Trust.

The 1919 statue of 'Our Lady of the Crag' now stands in the grounds of St Mary's Catholic church.

== See also ==
- Grade I listed buildings in North Yorkshire (district)
- Listed buildings in Knaresborough
- Cleeves Cove
- Dunton Cove
- The Holy Cave, Hunterston
- Peden's Cave (Auchinbay)
- St Robert's Cave and Chapel of the Holy Cross
