= St Robert's Church, Pannal =

- St Robert of Knaresborough Parish Church
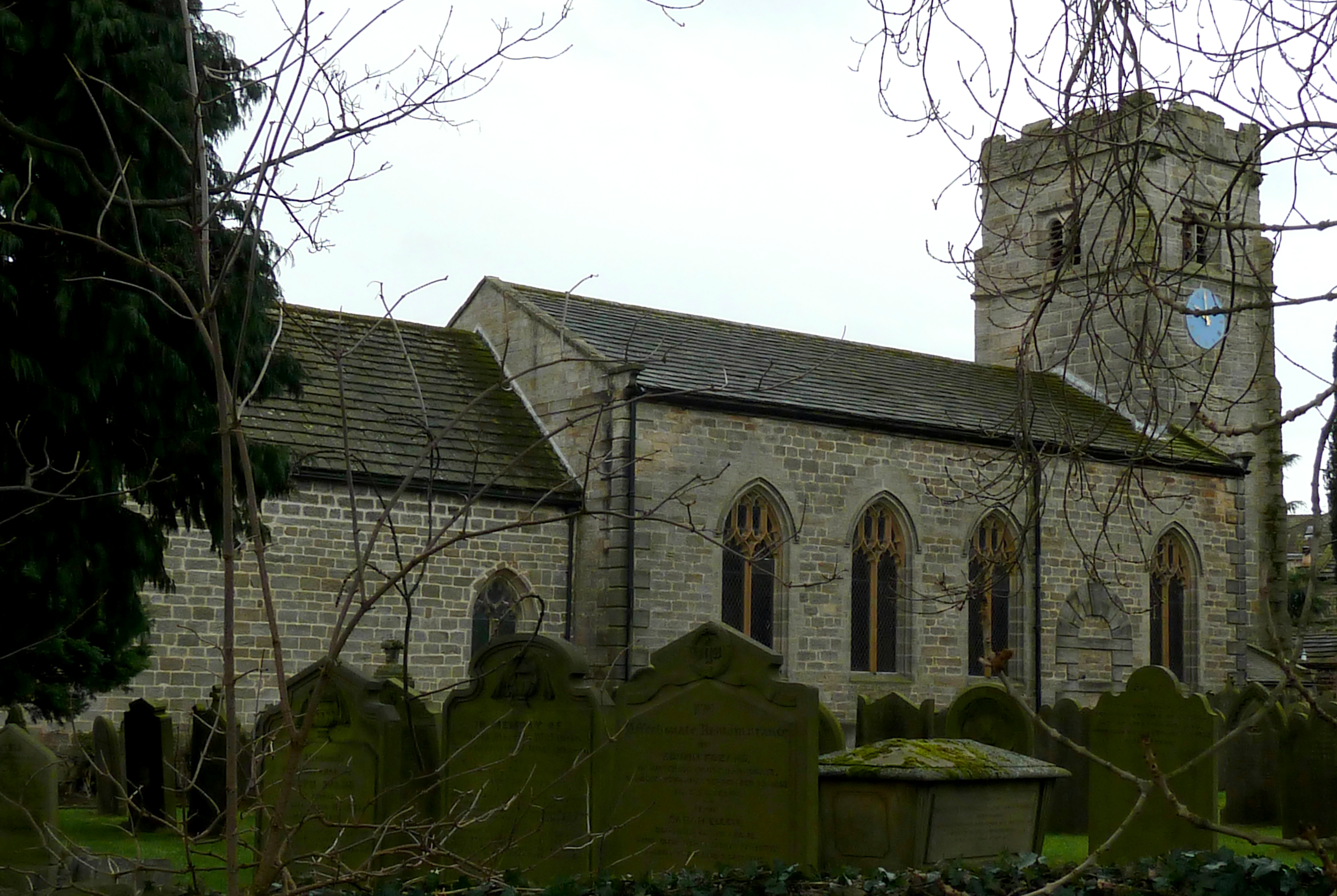
- St Robert’s Church, 2014

- Location within North Yorkshire
- 53°57′39″N 1°32′12″W
- OS grid reference: SE305517
- Location: Pannal, North Yorkshire
- Country: England
- Denomination: Church of England
- Previous denomination: Roman Catholic (13th century–1539)
- Churchmanship: Central
- Website: strobertschurch.co.uk

History
- Former name(s): St Michael the Archangel (or All Angels)
- Status: Parish church
- Founded: 13th century
- Dedication: Robert of Knaresborough
- Dedicated: 1319
- Consecrated: 1348

Architecture
- Functional status: Active
- Heritage designation: Grade II* listed 1149449
- Designated: 18 July 1949
- Architectural type: Parish church
- Style: Medieval

Administration
- Diocese: Diocese of Leeds
- Archdeaconry: Archdeacon of Ripon (301)
- Deanery: Harrogate (30104)
- Parish: Ecclesiastical parish of St Robert of Knaresborough, Pannal (300230 30/230)

Clergy
- Vicar: Reverend John Smith

St Robert's Church, Pannal, North Yorkshire, England, also known as St Robert of Knaresborough Parish Church, is a Grade II* listed building. A 13th-century wooden church dedicated to St Michael was rebuilt in sandstone in the 14th century by friars of the Trinitarian Order from Knaresborough Priory. It was perhaps then that it was rededicated to Robert of Knaresborough. Its nave was rebuilt in the 18th century, restored in the 19th and remodelled in the 20th. Extensions were added in the 20th century. It is a parish church, and the vicar also serves the Church of St Michael and All Angels, Beckwithshaw.

== Location ==
The church stands on Main Street in the historic core of the village of Pannal, at about 85 metres above sea level. Pannal is a "straggling linear" village among farms, woods and former quarries. The crenellated church tower is a significant landmark locally. The church stands opposite Pannal Hall, which from 1724 was the seat of the Bentley family: landowners whose memorials line the walls of the chancel. The Bentleys had the right to church tithes and the duty to maintain the chancel.

== History ==
The first record of the village is "Panhale" in the Pipe Rolls of 1170. A wooden church occupied the site of the present church probably in 1250, and definitely in 1271 when the archdeacon of Rochester Witton (or William?) de Santo Martino resigned the ministry of Pannal, and when the village was also called Rosehurst. The church was dedicated to St Michael and was called St Michael the Archangel (or All Angels) until at least 1304. Its vicar became Archdeacon of Rochester in 1271. Edmund Earl of Cornwall gave the church to St Robert's Priory in 1278. The present church was built before May 1318, when it was "said to have been damaged by a Scottish raiding party" who visited Pannal before or after attacking Knaresborough Castle, and left the village after stealing cattle and sacking and burning the church. The chancel was rebuilt in 1319 by friars from Knaresborough Priory. They belonged to the Trinitarian Order of St Robert of Knaresborough, and it may have been this event which inspired the rededication of the church. The priory received the church and its income from Edmund, 2nd Earl of Cornwall in 1319, and it was consecrated in 1348. The priory was dissolved in 1539, and Pannal Church became Protestant. In 1549 the Chantry of St James, Pannal, was dissolved. There are parish register transcripts for Pannal, dating from the 16th century onwards, at the Borthwick Institute for Archives.

Until the 19th century, this parish church was the village's civic and judicial centre. The parish chest held civil documents, and the vicar and warden held the keys. The church dispensed welfare monies and set up workhouses and poorhouses. The parish supported the village constable, and until the 1960s the old village stocks could be seen by the churchyard gate. In 1943 the 4th Harrogate (St Robert's) scout troop was located at the church.

=== St Robert ===
Pannal Church is the only one in the United Kingdom dedicated to Robert of Knaresborough (1170–1218). He was born in York, the son of Touk Flower. He was ordained subdeacon and served at Newminster Abbey near Morpeth in Northumberland for four and a half months. He returned to Knaresborough to become a hermit. His patron Juliana gave him the chapel of St Hilda at Rudfarlington. He became known as a holy man and lived in various places, including Spofforth near Pannal. He cared for the poor, and received support from King John, Sir William de Stuteville the son of Robert III de Stuteville, and his brother who became the Mayor of York.

== Structure ==
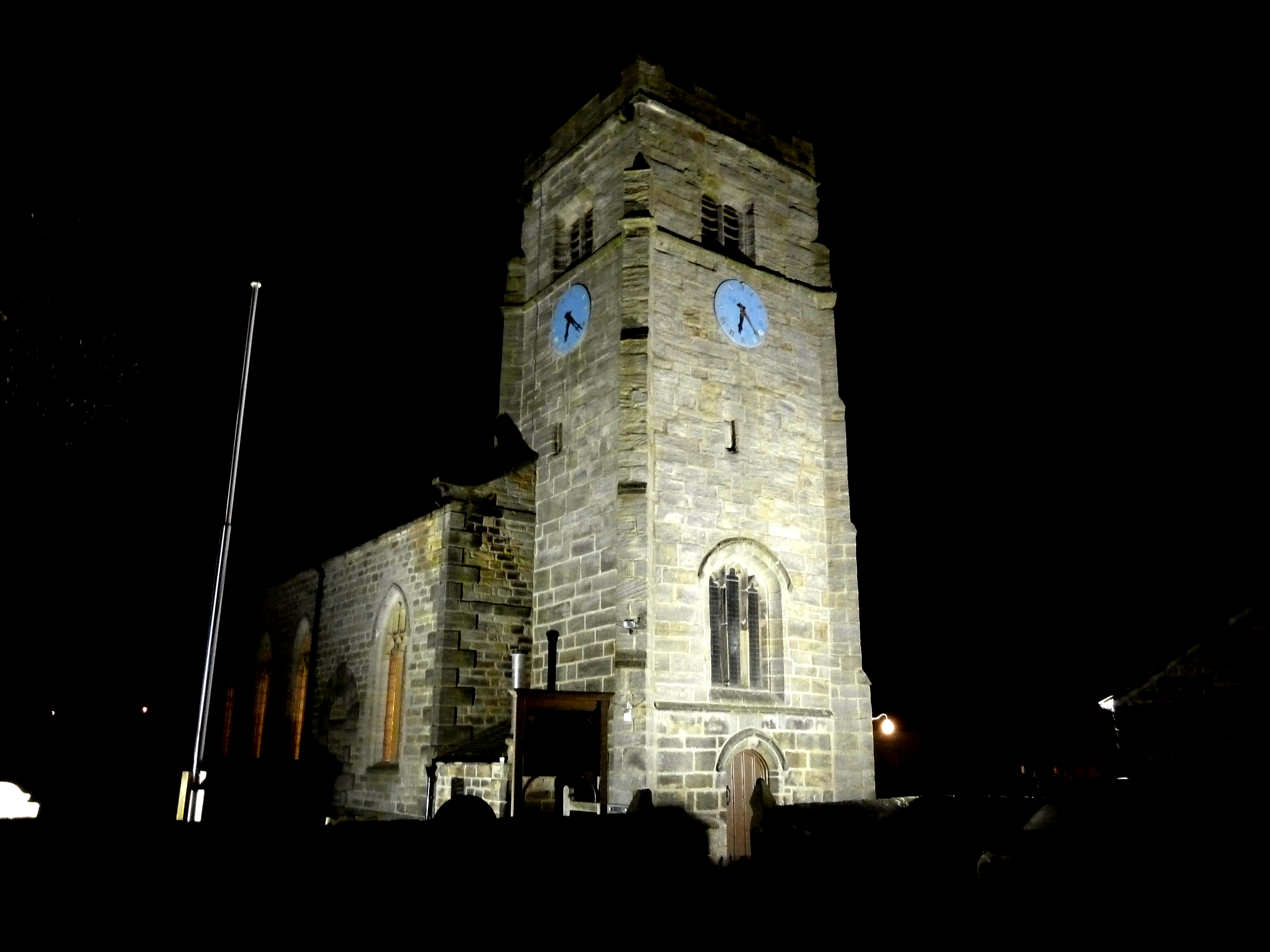
The floodlit church

The church was listed as Grade II*, number 1149449, on 18 July 1949 on the grounds that the tower and chancel constitute a medieval element of the dressed and coursed sandstone structure. It has graded-slate roofs. The chancel is lower and narrower than the nave, and was built in the 14th century, the east window tracery dates from 1350. Parts of the chancel may be remnants of the earlier 13th-century stone church. The tower was added at the west end in the 15th or 16th century. During the ministry of William Raper and after becoming derelict, the nave was rebuilt in 1772 with Georgian elements in the churchwarden style, including "rounded Georgian windows with amber glass, a plaster ceiling with a decorated cornice, box pews and a three-decker pulpit (all now gone). It was restored during the ministry of Mark Rowntree in 1882 to 1884 while the church was closed. He replaced the box pews with pitch pine ones and removed the three-decker pulpit. He lowered the nave floor by 2 feet (0.61 m) and raised the chancel floor and ceiling to create the Bentley's burial crypt below. It was probably at this time that the present arch-braced truss ceiling was installed. Before Rowntree's work, the nave floor was higher than those of the tower and chancel. The same section was remodelled again in 1929 when the ceiling and some oak roof beams were replaced, and electric light installed. In 1930 perpendicular windows replaced the Georgian ones. In 1934 the church acquired an organ loft in the tower arch and the ground floor of the tower became a vestry. On the south side a porch and choir vestry were added in 1952, the glazed and polygonal chapter house was built in 1977 and the parish meeting rooms and kitchen in 1988 or 1999.

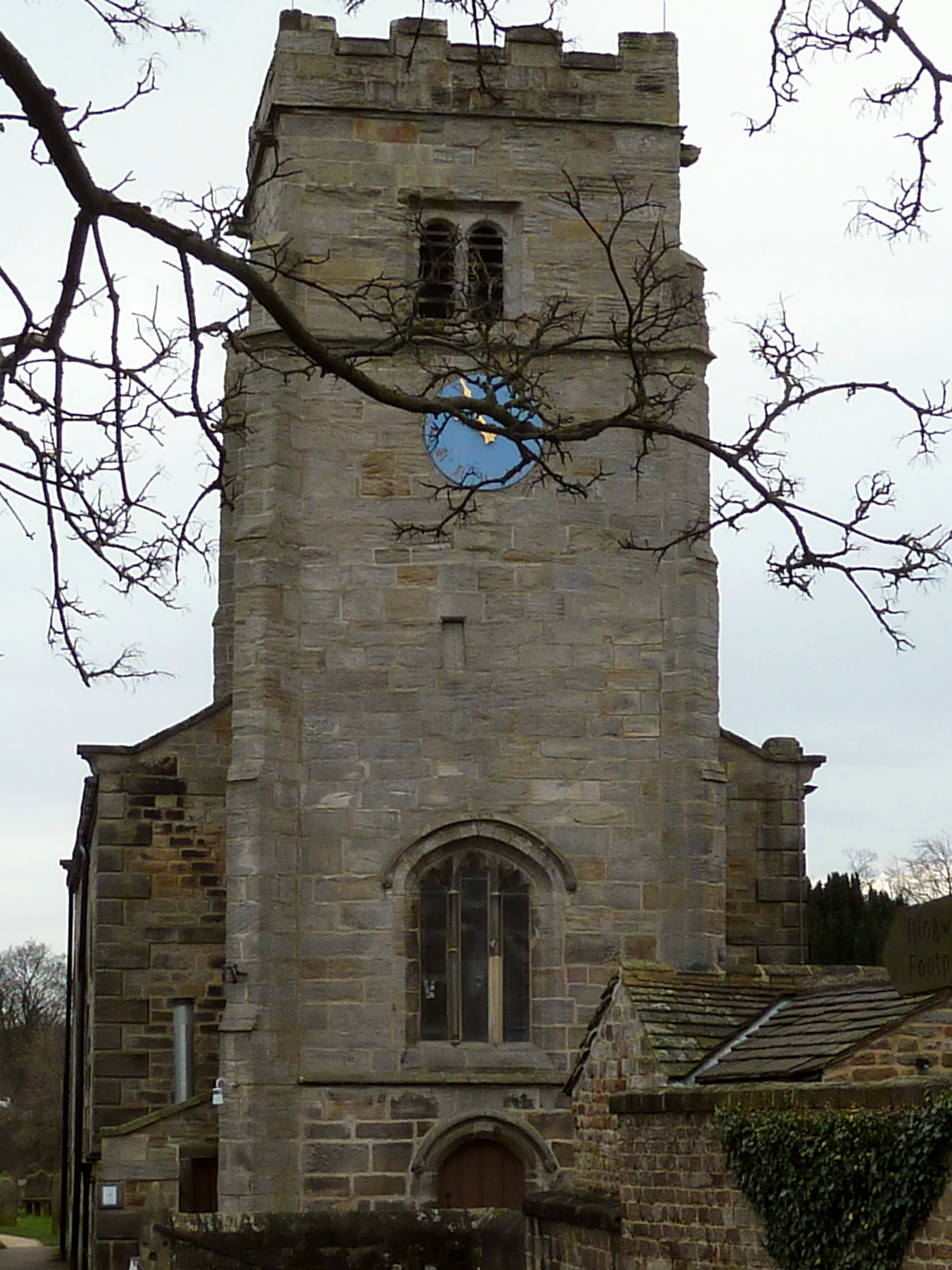
C15–C16 tower

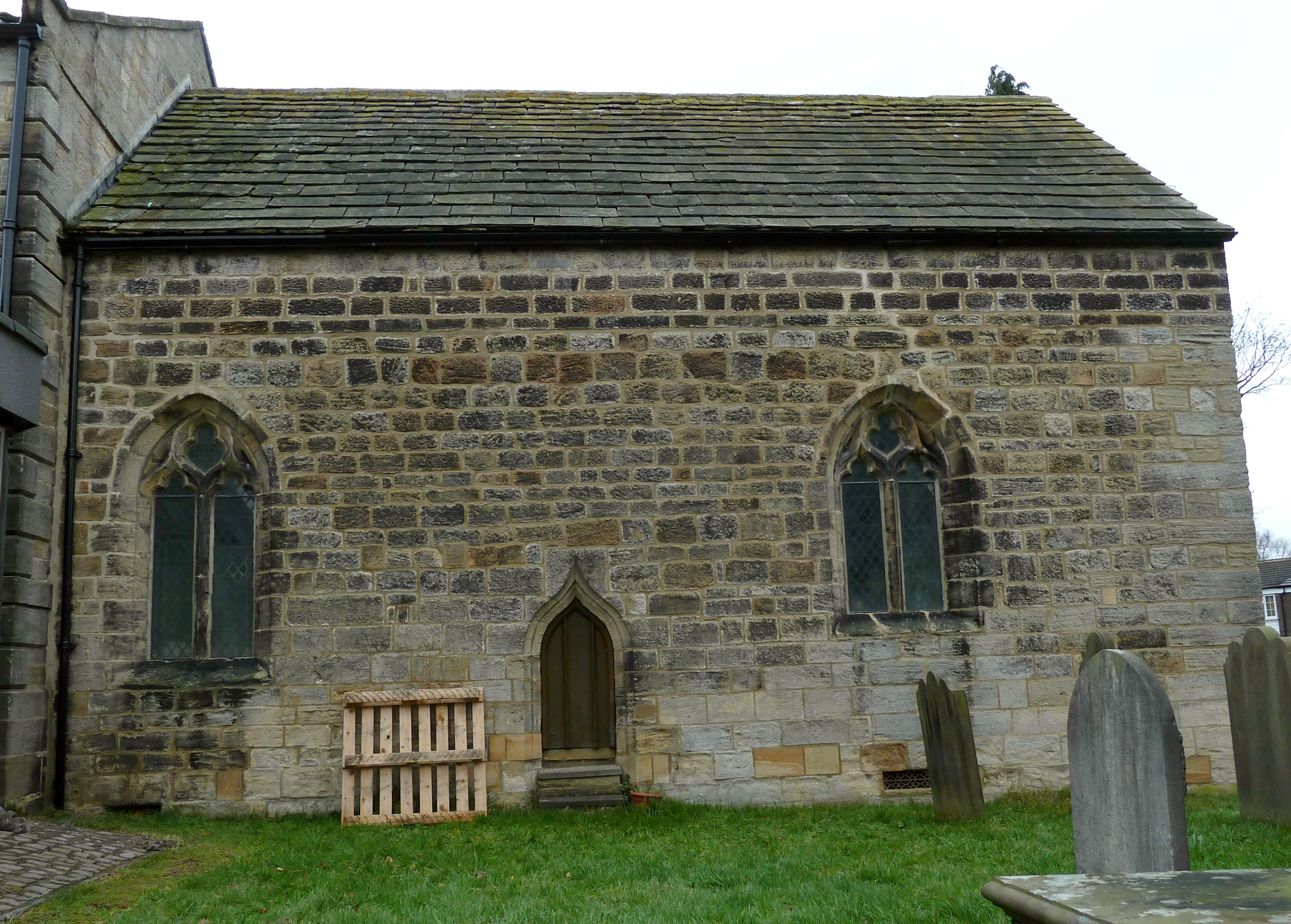
C14 chancel

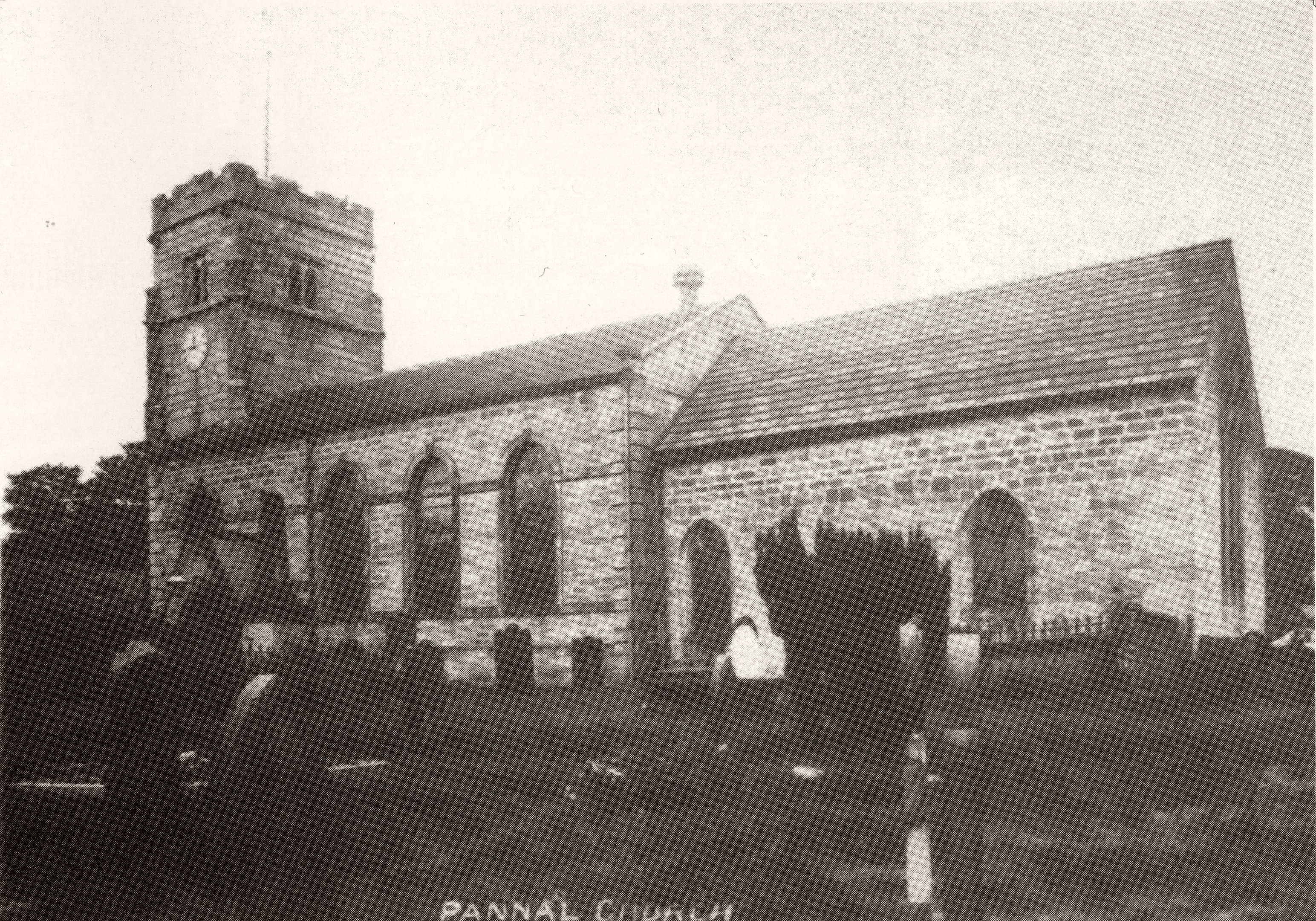
South elevation in early C20

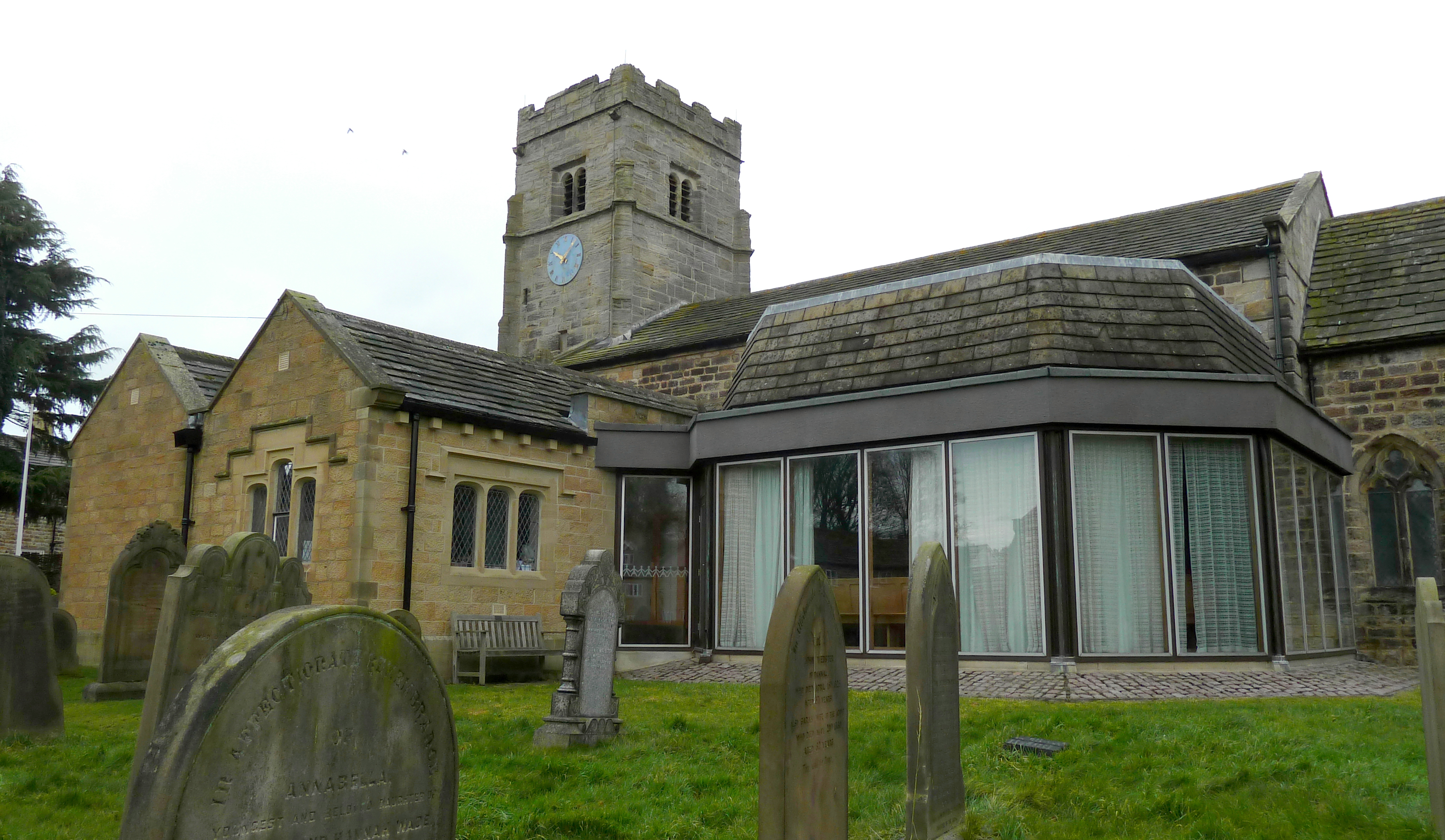
South elevation in 2014, showing extensions

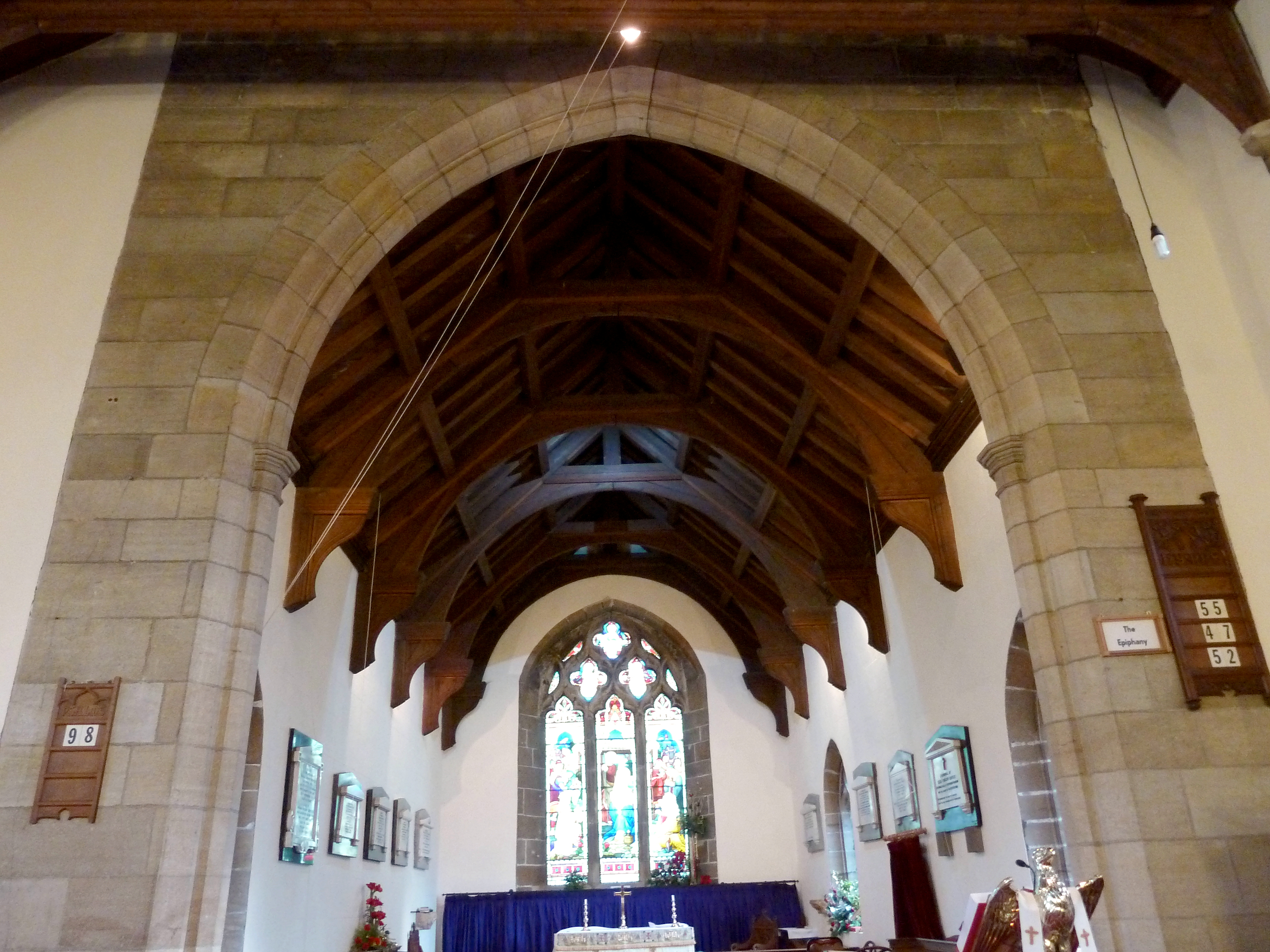
Arch-braced trusses in chancel

== Church exterior ==
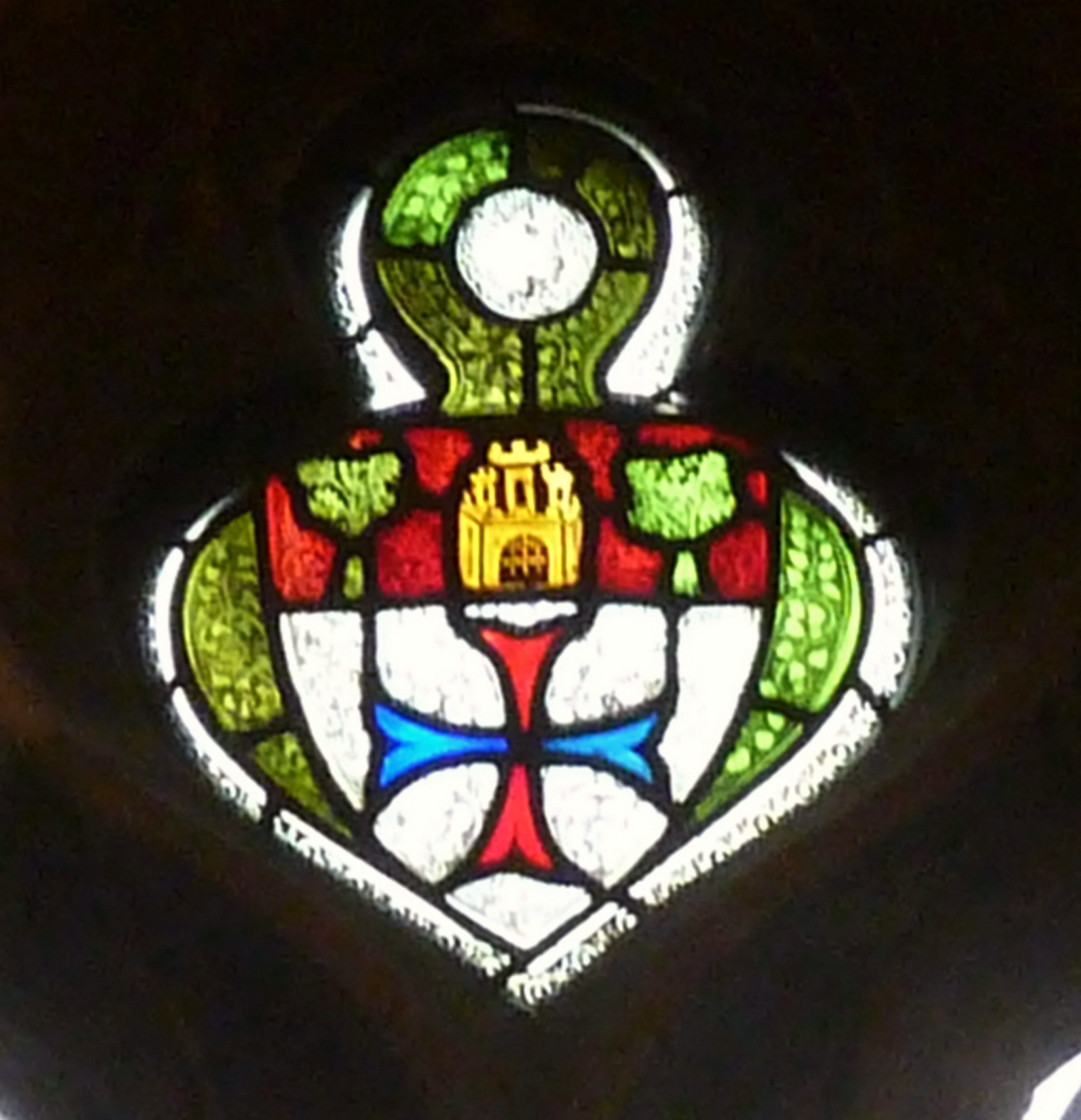
C14–C15 window with Trinitarian cross

The tower is in perpendicular style, in three exterior visual stages separated by stringing. On different levels it has three interior floors consisting of the vestry and its loft at the bottom, then a clock chamber whose floor is roughly level with the nave ceiling, and a bell chamber on the top floor. The bottom and middle floor levels are indistinguishable from the outside, because the diagonal buttresses run up the bottom two stages and half of the top stage, and there is exterior stringing halfway up the bottom floor but not between the bottom and middle floors. However, stringing on the exterior identifies the floor level of the bell stage. The interior chambers of the tower appear tiny because of the space taken by the spiral staircase inside its south wall. The church's ribbed west door, in a "segmental-pointed" arch with "broad chamfer" is in the lower exterior stage. The three-light window above is included in the exterior second stage with the spiral staircase windows and the blue clock faces. The three-light window is hidden in the interior, being inaccessible in the vestry loft. The third stage has double, uncusped, round-headed bell-openings on all four sides, and an embattled parapet. The tower is floodlit at night.

The nave was rebuilt in the Georgian era, and the visual evidence of this is the "rusticated quoins and the rusticated surround of a former blind north doorway." The two-light windows in perpendicular style were added in 1929, the south-east one having been shortened when the chapter house was added. The chancel is in decorated style. It has four windows, its east window having three lights and reticulated tracery, plus an ogee-headed priest's doorway on the south side. One of the chancel's stained glass windows is from Knaresborough Priory. It is a small window in the point of an arch, showing a coat of arms with two oaks above a red and blue Trinitarian cross. The oaks may commemorate the fact that "in August 1255 the king gave three oaks to the friars of the Holy Trinity for the fabric of the church of St Robert,". Pannal historian Anne Smith suggests that the object between the oaks is the gateway to the Priory.

On the south-west and north-west buttresses of the tower are ancient and almost-illegible carvings about 2.5 inches (6.4 cm) across, and about 3 feet (0.91 m) from the ground. They may be consecration crosses, following the tradition in which Anglican bishops have anointed each corner of the church with chrism as part of the consecration ritual, then commemorative crosses were placed at the same points. At first sight the carvings appear to be Tudor roses or the fleurs-de-lis used by English monarchs from the 14th to 18th century, but the raised "petals" may be the gaps between the curved arms of the deeply engraved cross.

== Church interior ==
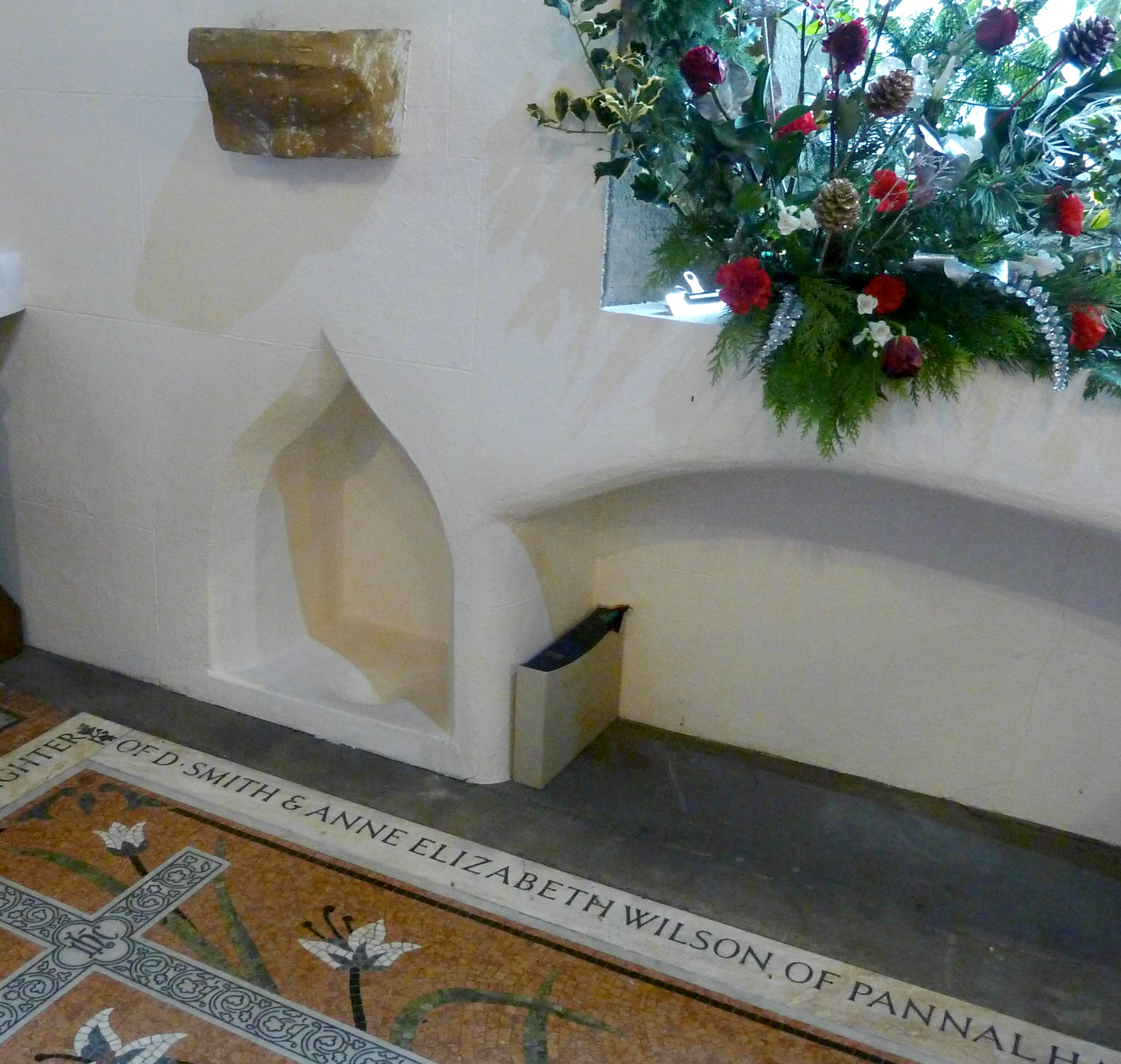
Piscina and top of sedilia

=== Sanctuary and chancel ===
In the walls of the sanctuary are two corbels which have been re-set, and they may indicate the use of a Lenten veil. On the sanctuary floor are early 20th century memorial mosaics, with a crypt below. The chancel contains a 14th century piscina with an ogee opening, but the piscina and the top of the sedilia are low on the wall to the right of the altar, indicating a raising of the stone floor which has 17th and 19th century ledgers. It has scribed render walls. The roof was restored in 1884, and is arch-braced with 4.5 bays.

=== Nave ===
The "tie-beam roof on corbelled brackets, with cusped arcading over the beams" of the nave has been rebuilt and remodelled several times, but may perhaps be mainly attributed to the 19th century works. The walls are plastered and there are floorboards under the pews. Between the nave and the tower's ground-floor vestry is an organ, built against the tower arch. English Heritage describes the fixtures in the nave and chancel as follows:

The font, probably of 1772, is of polished marble and of unusual oval shape. Its wooden canopy has a finial surmounted by a dove. The C19 pulpit is polygonal Perpendicular with a figure of the Good Shepherd. Pews are mainly C19 and their ends have notional poppy heads. Choir stalls have ends with scrolled foliage to the tops, and Gothic blind-panelled frontals. The C19 altar table incorporates C17 panels. The east window shows the Nativity (1883). There are C19 and C20 memorial tablets, and a memorial tablet to the Symeson/Simpson family set up after the death of William Simpson in 1886, by Day of Knaresborough.^{English Heritage listing details 1149449}

The tower and chancel arches are on polygonal shafts and built in 1929.

The font is made of limestone from Derbyshire, and the stone contains small fossils. The church accounts of 1686 refer to "putting a loop ring" on the font for two pennies; the loop fitted on the rim of this rare oval font is still in situ, dating it to before that date. The church leaflet mentions legends of its origin in Fountains Abbey or in a mansion where the font was once a wine cooler. Contrary to the above listing description, it is the wooden cover and not the font which was made in 1772 and restored in 1975. The brass eagle lectern was presented to the church in 1875. The pulpit, presented to the church in 1955, is the work of Norval Paxton; this is possibly architect Norval Paxton of Tadcaster who designed the church hall (dedicated in 1947 and now demolished) at Foundry Mill Street in Seacroft. The east window in the chancel was presented by Eliza Bentley in 1883.

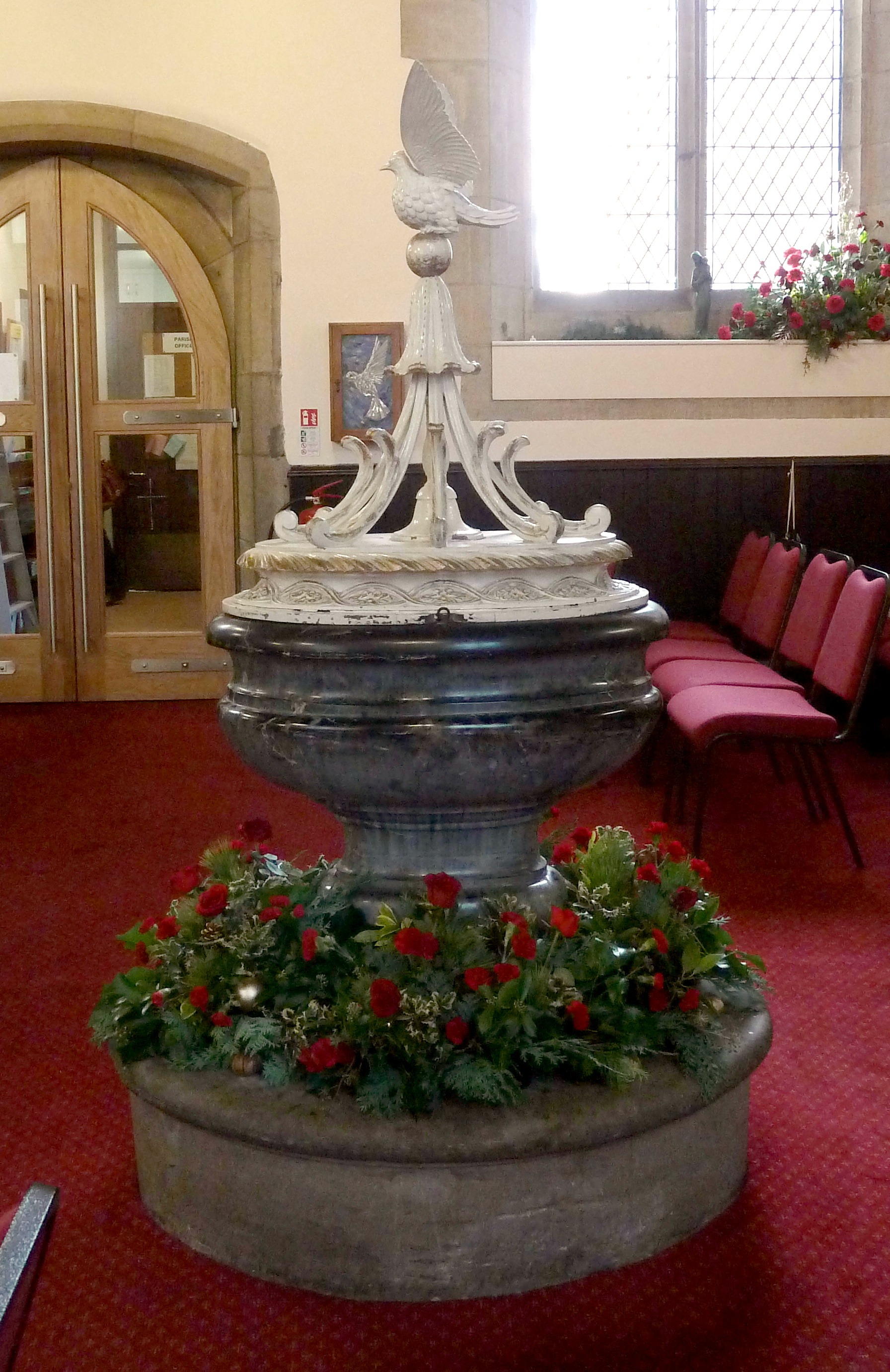
Oval font

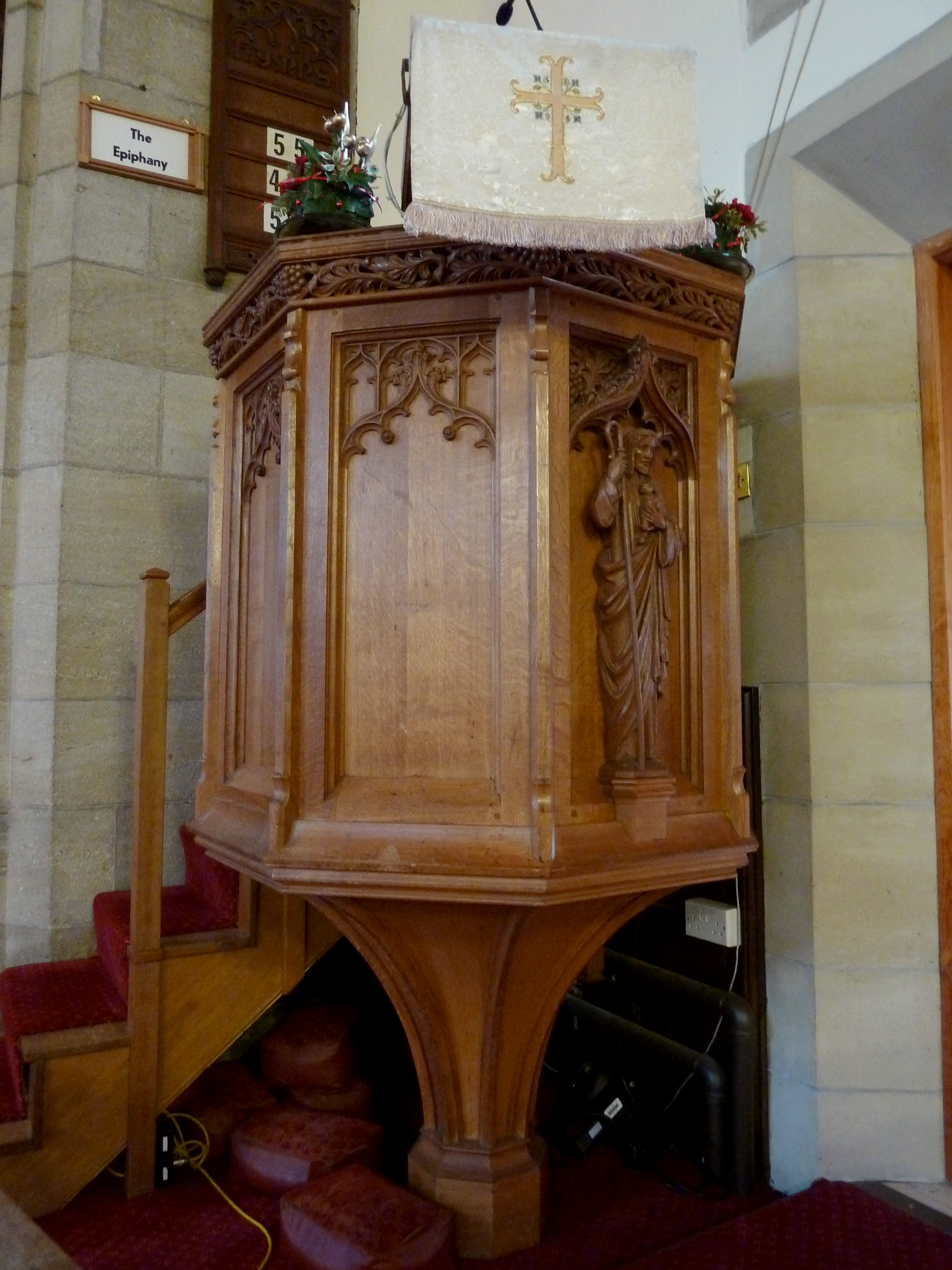
Pulpit by
Norval Paxton

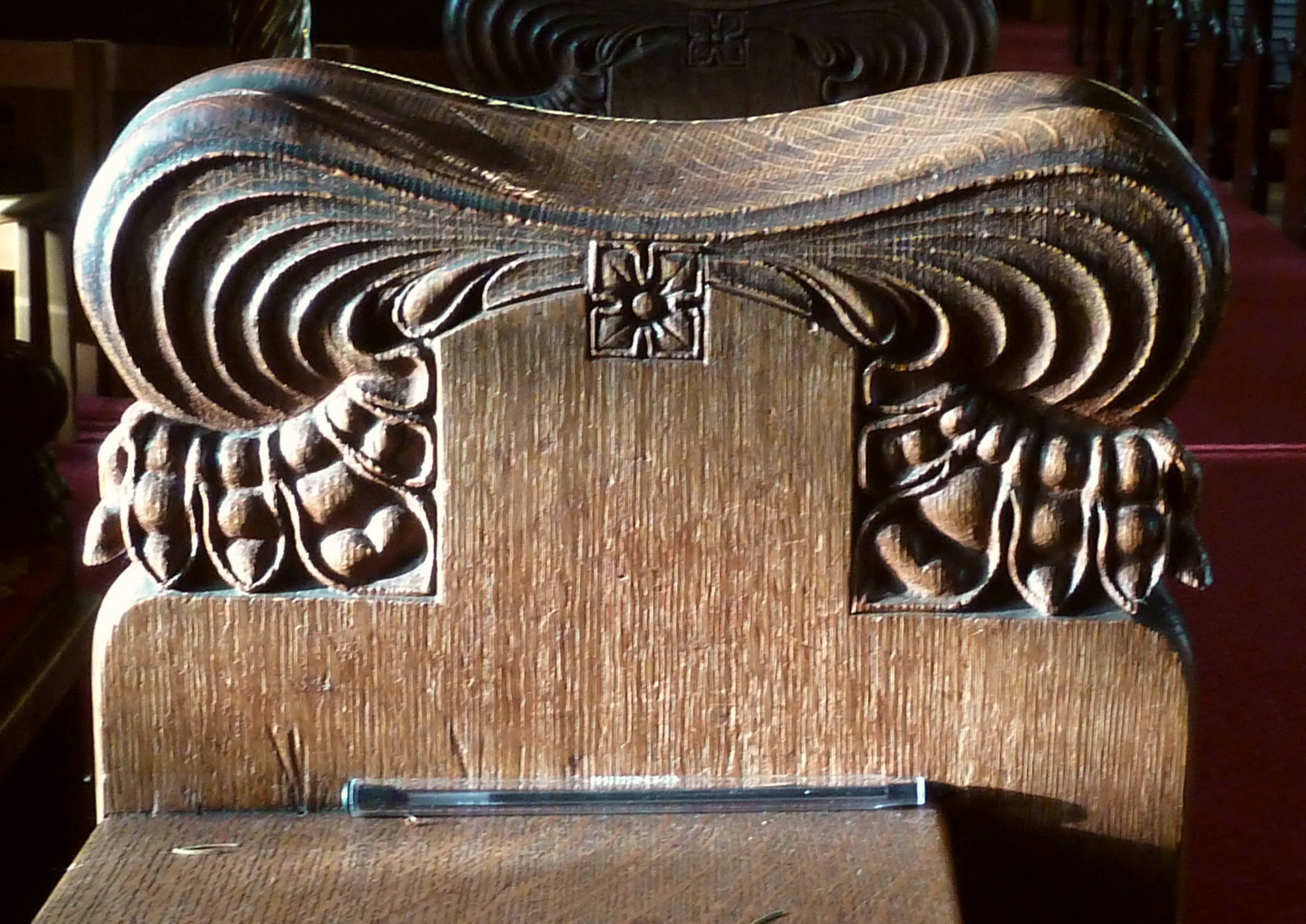
Choir stall carving

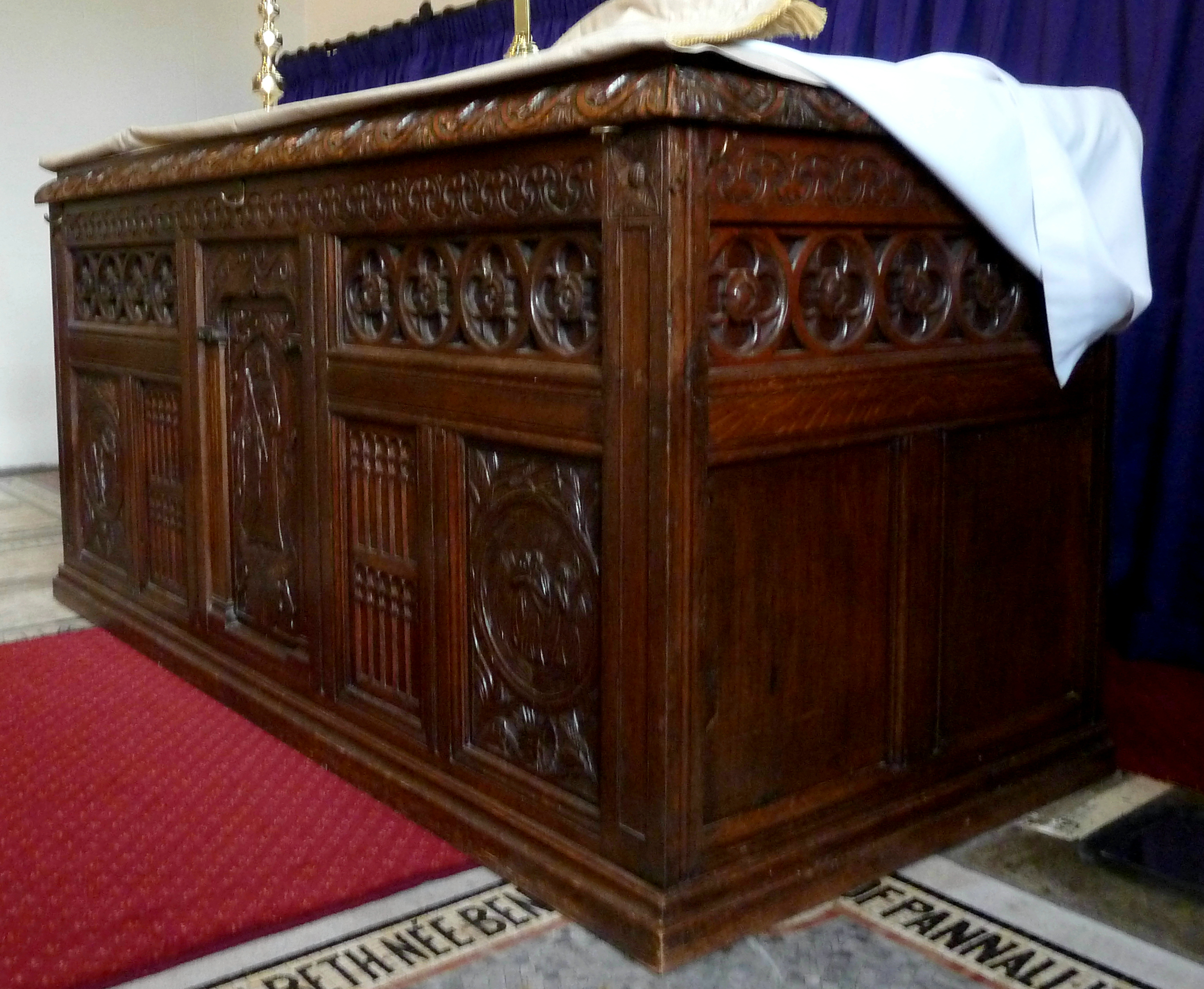
Altar table

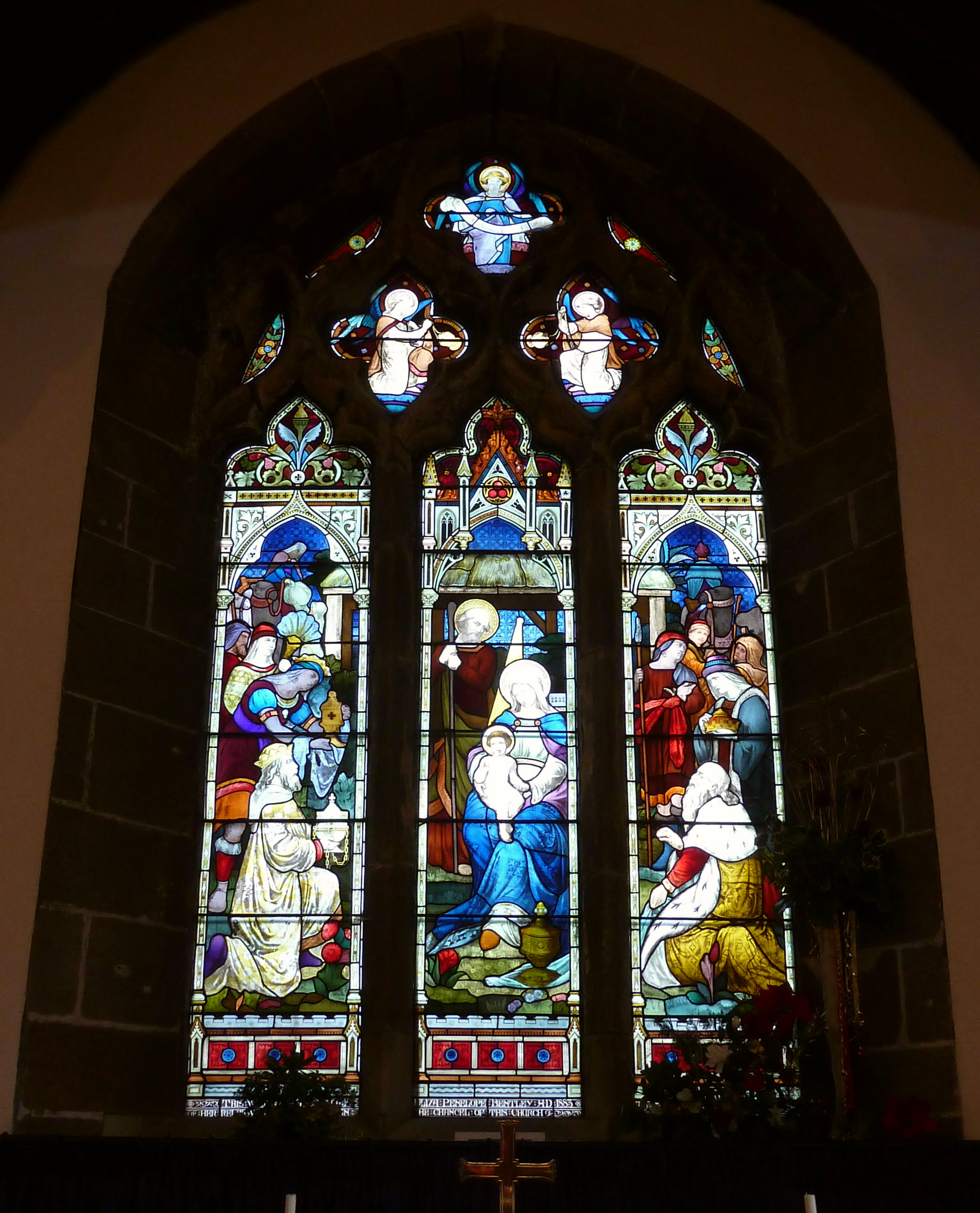
East window

=== Tower ===
There is no public access to the interior of the tower. It contains three floors, a very narrow stone spiral staircase on the south side, and a roof area with a trapdoor. The staircase has steep risers and is naturally lit when the sun is in the southern quarter by three very small glazed windows, however at other times all or part of the staircase is pitch dark. The ground floor contains the vestry with its own loft above, incorporating the west window which is inaccessible to visitors. The middle floor is the clock chamber, containing a turret clock mechanism serving the three blue clock faces of the tower, and chiming on the hour. It probably dates from the 19th century, and has been wound and maintained for generations by the local Shutt family. In recent years the cranks and clock weights were removed to Pannal Hall (where they were lost) and the clock and chime mechanism is now driven by two electric motors. The clock employs a clapper mechanism on the largest bell to chime the hour. The top floor of the tower is the bell chamber. Two of the three hung and functioning bells are dated 1669 and 1703, both re-cast by Samuel Smith of York. This might imply that the smallest bell could be contemporary with the 15th to 16th century tower.

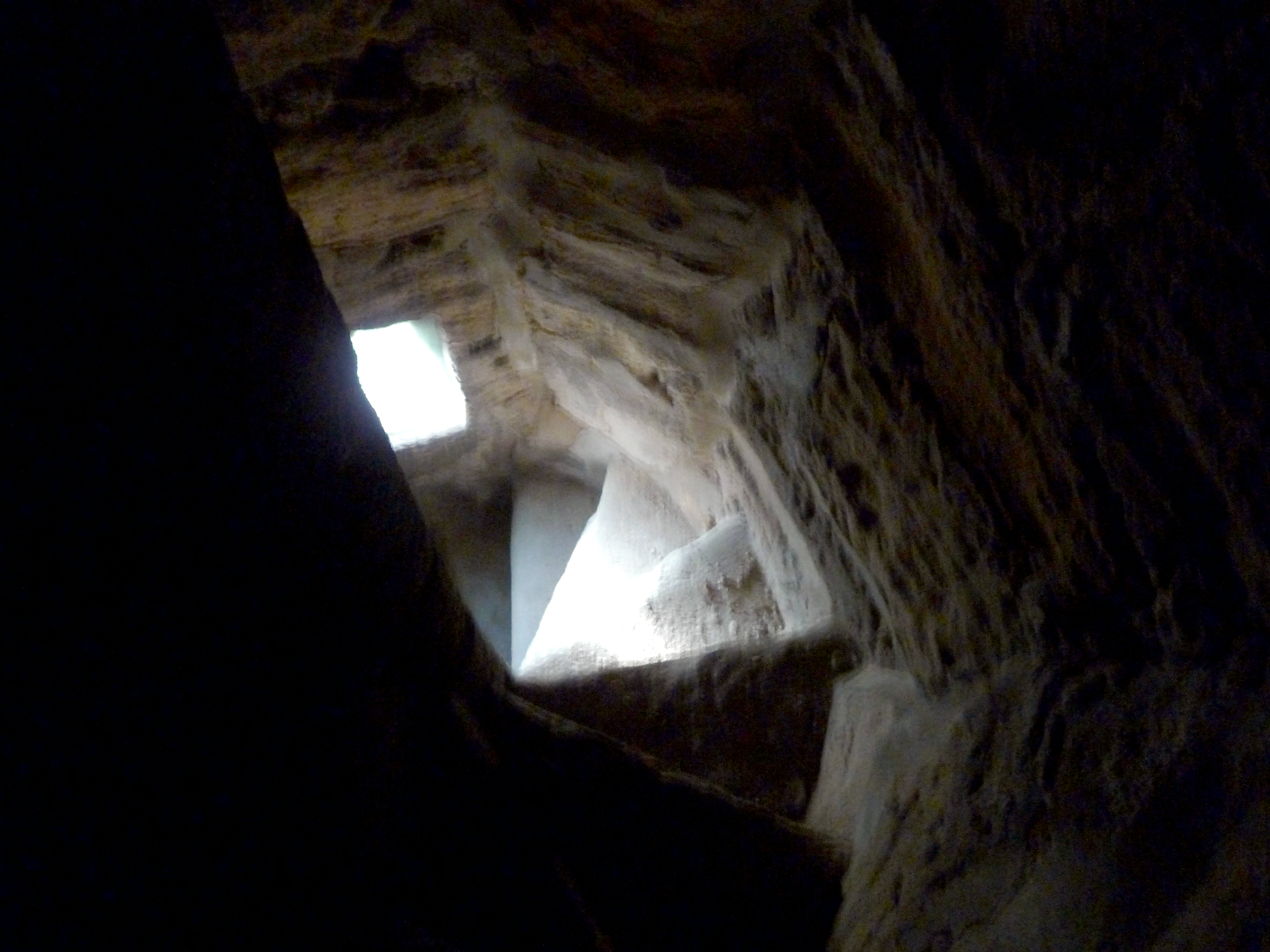
Spiral stairs in tower

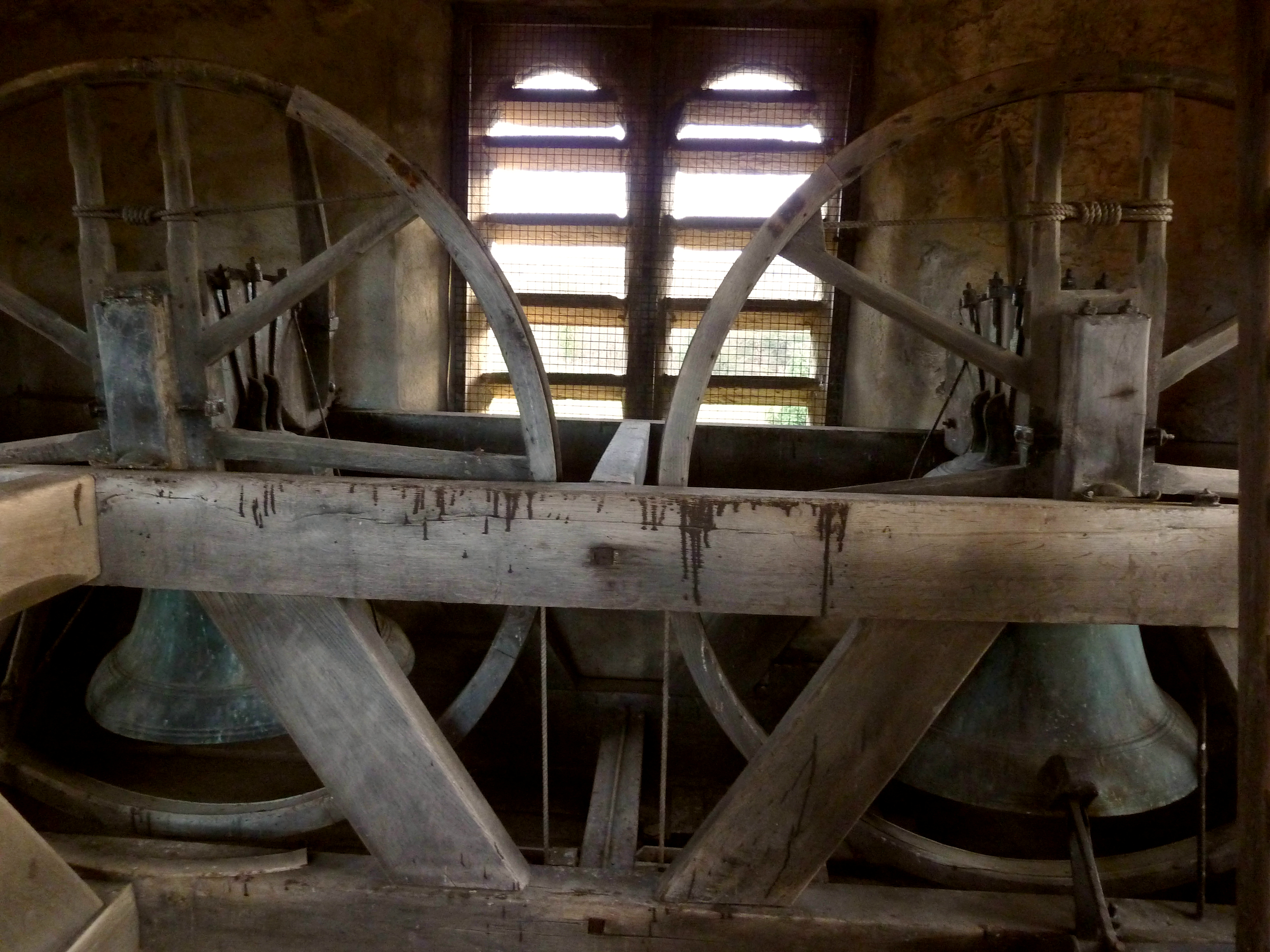
Bell chamber

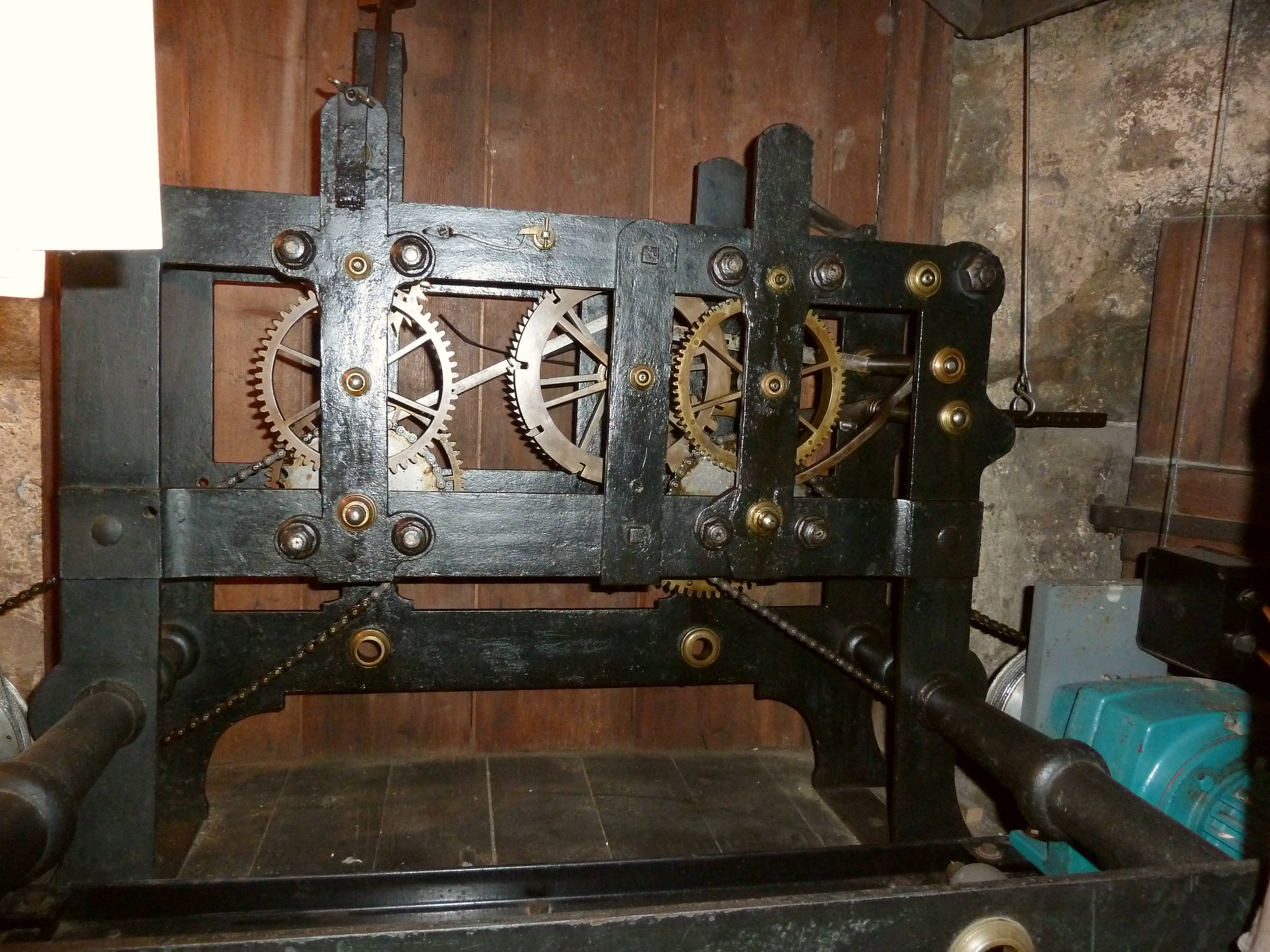
Clock mechanism

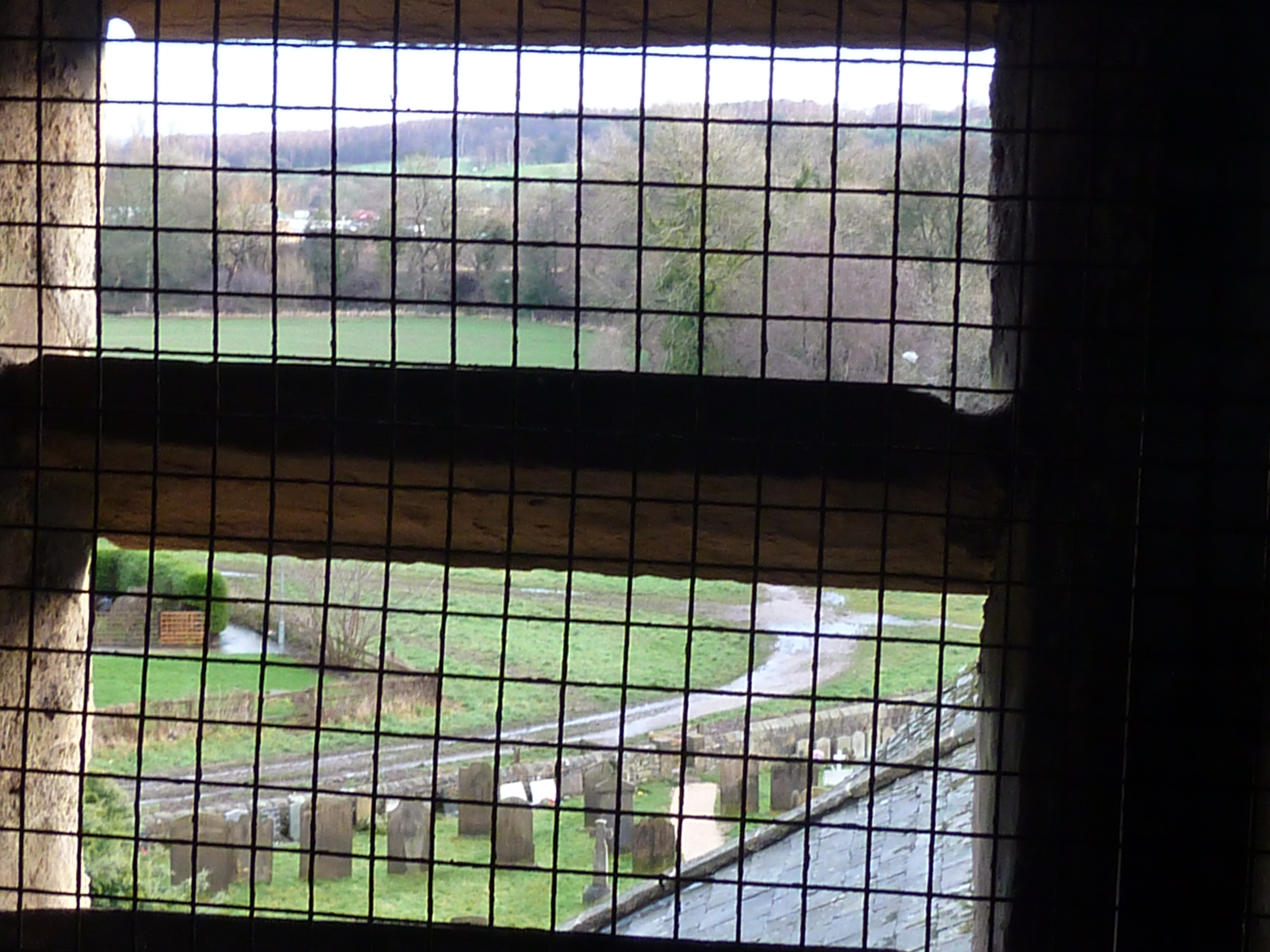
View north from bell chamber

=== Chapter house ===
Here is displayed a pair of handcuffs and a truncheon once used by 18th and 19th century constables of the parish, who were employed by the churchwarden.

== Churchyard and environs ==
Three stone cottages and a forge used to stand in front of the church; these were demolished in 1970 and the stone was re-used to build the church's present car-park wall. The gateposts leading from the car-park to the churchyard were once reputedly the posts for the original village stocks, which have been replaced with a replica. The churchyard was enlarged by half an acre on the south side with land given by Eliza Bentley in 1868. Near the south entrance there is an old sundial-base, which once said, "PB 1675, Redime Tempus", referring to St Paul in Ephesians V.16: "redeeming the time, because the days are evil". The foot-scrapers by the south entrance utilise the bases of columns from the original nave of 1319. Joseph Thackeray of Harrogate's sulphur well was buried here in 1791, and Betty Lupton, "Queen of Wells" and manager of the spa at Harrogate, in 1843.

== Clergy ==
=== Historical clergy ===
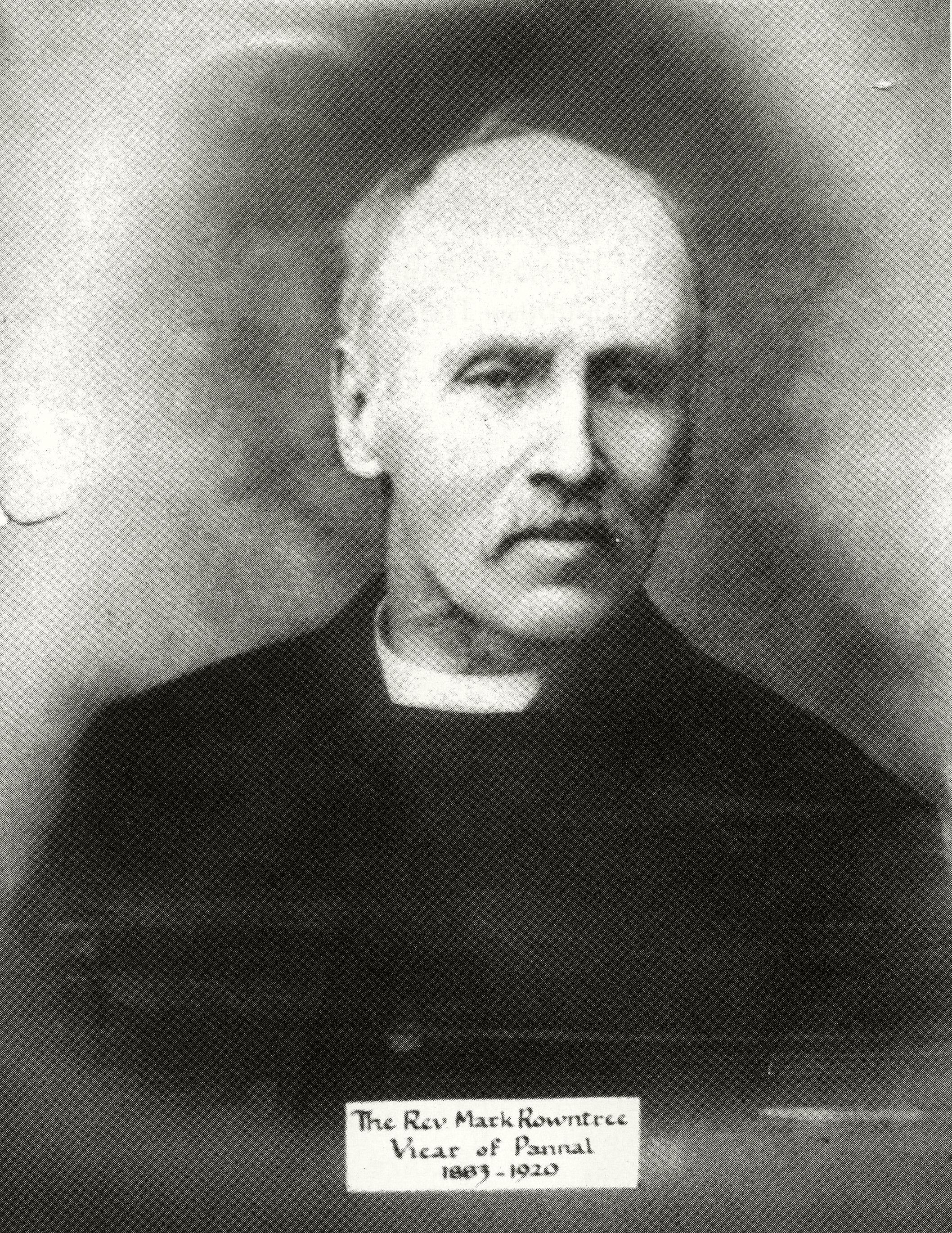
Rev. Mark Rowntree was vicar 1883–1920

This list is taken from a plaque in the nave of the church. The archdeacon of Rochester resigned the rectory of Pannal in 1271, and thus begins the list of clergy. The first in 1271 was William de Sancto Martino, listed as Monsigneur Martyn of St Clements Priory. There followed on 5 January 1311 Thomas of Skelthorpe, a brother of Knaresborough Priory. Then came brother John Brown in 1348, the first paid vicar of Pannal, who died of the Black Death in 1349, then brother William of Kent in 1349 and brother William of Pudsey in 1364. In 1369 it was brother Richard of Wakefield; in 1370 concurrently brothers William of Berkshire and William Brott. In the 15th century it was brother John Strensall 1421, brother Will Windus 1451, brother Peter Patrington 1459, brother Lawrence Screwton or Scruton 1474, brother Christopher Craven 1475 and brother Will Yorke 1493. The 16th century begins with brother Henry Bell in 1511, then brother John Godbehere in 1515, brother Percival Dibbs in 1524 and Prior Will Lambert in 1535. St Roberts Priory was dissolved in 1539, and in 1549 the Chantry of St James, Pannal, was dissolved. In 1677 and 1683 the ministers were William Cheldrey and William Parsons, beginning the Protestant era of the church. These were followed by a number of curates: Thomas Green 1694, Christopher Jackson, 1696 and John Wright in 1699 (d.1707). It is not known whether there was then another gap with no vicar.

The next curate was Lister Simondson in 1728. The same Reverend Lister Simondson was "instituted vicar on the presentation of the king" George II in 1745. Succeeding vicars were William Loup 1750, Robert Midgeley 1756, William Raper 1758, John Umpleby 1789, Ralph Bates Hunter 1816, and Thomas Simpson 1835. In 1836 Pannal left York diocese, and joined the renewed Ripon diocese. The following clergy were William Vawdrey 1862, G.O. Brownrigg 1875, L.F. Harrison 1876, and Mark Rowntree (1838–1923) in 1883. Rowntree wrote Pannal, Past and Present: or, the past and present of an ancient Yorkshire Parish (1921). In the 20th century it was Charles Wright 1920, Charles E. Dixon 1928, G.W.L. Martin 1948 and J.R. Shearman 1957.

Vicars of Pannal and Beckwithshaw churches

Rev. John T. Scott took office in Pannal in 1978. From 1980 onwards, Pannal and Beckwithshaw churches operated as a joint benefice, sharing one vicar. After Scott came Rev. Mark De la Poer Beresford-Peirse (born 1945) 1990; he was descended from an aristocratic family. The most recent was Rev. Nigel C. Sinclair who served from 2002 to 2013. In the 2008 Anglican debate over Ordination of women and homosexuality, he did not want to take sides.

=== Current clergy ===
The patrons of the church are: the Bishop of Leeds Nicholas Baines, Peache Trustees; jointly. As of 2018 the vicar is the Reverend John Smith, previously curate of Holy Trinity Church, Idle, in the former Diocese of Bradford - now Leeds. He was licensed to the benefice on Monday, 20 January 2014. The vicar also serves the Church of St Michael of all Angels at Beckwithshaw. As of 2018 the curate was The Revd Abbie Palmer. She was ordained deacon at Bradford Cathedral in July 2017, and ordained priest at Ripon Cathedral on 23 June 2018. The benefice is Pannal with Beckwithshaw (30/153BH).

== Access and facilities ==
Viewing of the church is by appointment, except during the summer months when the church is kept open for visitors throughout the day; the tower is inaccessible to the public. There is a toilet but no café. Coffee and drinks are available at the Co-op store next to Pannal station.

The church has a Junior Church (Sunday school), a youth group and a choir. It has an organ and presents concerts. There is wheelchair access, and a hearing induction loop. There are large-print hymn books, toilets and baby-changing facilities, plus a car park.

== Events ==
=== Regular events ===
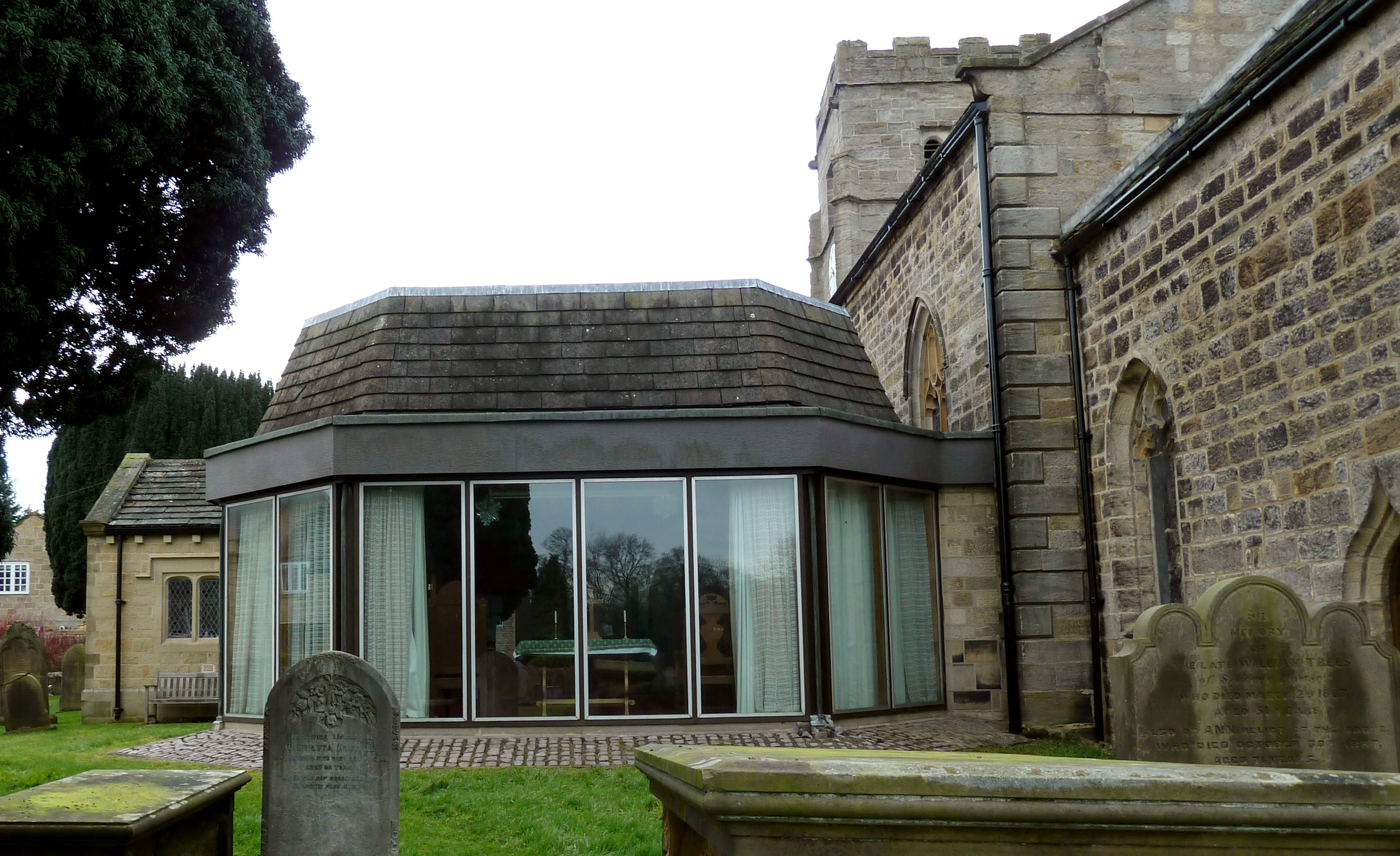
The chapter house

The church hall hosts local events, including the annual beer festival in the chapter house. Until 2011 the mobile library stopped regularly outside the church. St Roberts Autumn Fair, the Mothers' Union, Pannal Women's Fellowship, Pannal Wives' Group and the Pannal Friendly Club meet at the chapter house, where the Pram Service is also held. Pannal Village Society has sometimes used the chapter house for public discussions regarding local development. Coffee mornings are regularly held at the church. Pannal Textile Group meets regularly at the chapter house, and sometimes holds exhibitions.

=== Local happenings ===
On 24 October 2005, vandals broke glass on the church noticeboard, but it was quickly repaired. In 2012 the church hosted an exhibition featuring local history. In 2013 St Roberts Church won the bronze Community Grounds award: one of the Harrogate in Bloom awards. In March 2013 there was a Red Nose Day tea in the chapter house, and local people played pranks, wearing their children's school uniform.

== See also ==
- Grade II* listed churches in North Yorkshire (district)
- Listed buildings in Pannal and Burn Bridge

== Bibliography ==
- Lee, H.; Norris, H. (1994). St Robert of Knaresborough Parish Church.
- Pevsner, N. (1967). The Buildings of England: Yorkshire, West Riding. Yale University Press. p. 390. ISBN 978-0300096620.
- Rowntree, Rev. Mark (1921). Pannal, Past and Present: or, the past and present of an ancient Yorkshire Parish. Robert Ackrill (modern reprint).
- Smith, Anne (1999). Postcards from Pannal. Pannal: Anne Smith (self-published).
