= Robert of Knaresborough =

Yorkshire hermit

Saint Robert of Knaresborough
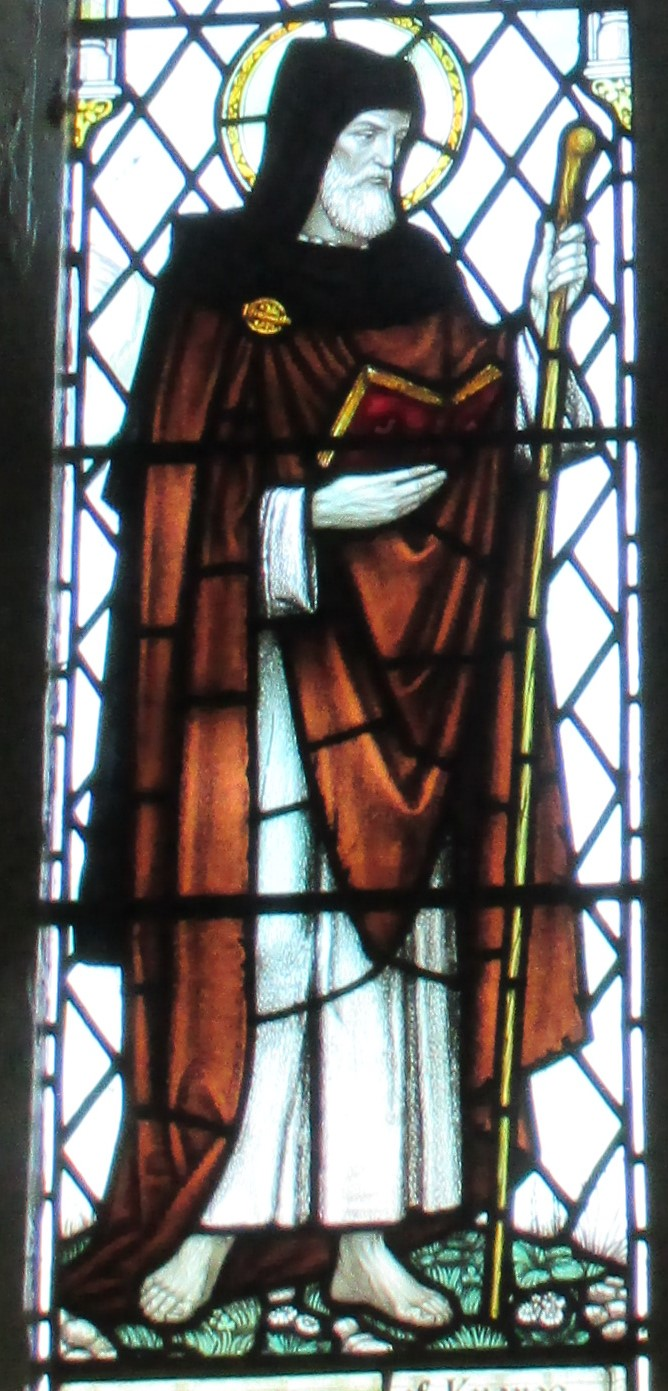
- A modern stained-glass depiction of St. Robert in Holy Trinity Church, Lower Beeding, West Sussex
- Born: c. 1160; York, North Yorkshire
- Residence: a cave at Knaresborough
- Died: 1218 (aged 57–58); Knaresborough, North Yorkshire
- Venerated in: Anglican Communion; Roman Catholic Church
- Major shrine: Knaresborough
- Feast: 24 September
- Attributes: a bearded monk holding a book

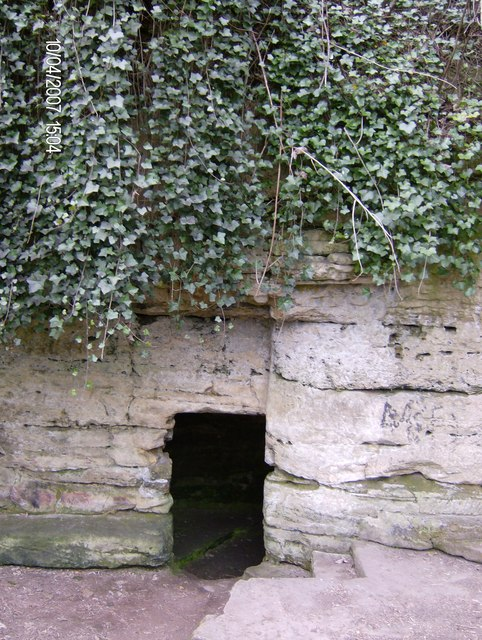
St Robert's Cave

Robert of Knaresborough (St Robert, born Robert Flower, c. 1160 – 24 September 1218) was a British hermit and saint who lived in a cave by the river Nidd at Knaresborough, North Yorkshire. Though not formally canonised, he is celebrated as a saint through popular acclaim in both the Anglican and Roman Catholic traditions, his feast day being the 24th of September. Robert was born in York to wealthy parents but shunned that life, living instead as a hermit with a strong following and founding a holy order belonging to the Trinitarians in the market town of Knaresborough. He is also notable in that, after his death, his body exuded a healing oil, making him a myroblyte saint.

== Life ==
He was born Robert Flower (Floure or Fleur) in York, the son of Touk Flower, mayor of York, around 1160.

Very early in his life he became a sub-deacon and a novice at the Cistercian Newminster Abbey, but he stayed there only a few months.

Seeking a life of solitude, he visited a knight-hermit who lived in a cave by the River Nidd at Knaresborough, hiding from King Richard the Lionheart. On the death of the king, the knight returned home to his family leaving Robert on his own. The cave had a small chapel dedicated to St Giles, the 7th century Greek hermit, built around it. He continued to live there for some years, until a wealthy widow, Juliana, offered him a cell at St Hilda's Chapel in nearby Rudfarlington. There, he developed a reputation as a wise and holy man who cared for the poor. He stayed just a year before his hermitage was destroyed by bandits. Robert, dispossessed of his home, lived for a time under the church wall at Spofforth, and then he tried living with the monks at Hedley, near Tadcaster, but he found them too easygoing for his style of life. By this time, the area had calmed down and he returned to Rudfarlington.

Robert was well known for his charity to the poor and destitute. His favourite form of charity was to redeem men from prison. For a time, Robert prospered, having four servants and keeping cattle, but he was soon in trouble again, this time with William de Stuteville, the constable of Knaresborough castle, who accused him of harbouring thieves and outlaws. Having his hermitage destroyed for the second time, this time by the forces of law and order under William de Stuteville, Robert returned to the cave at Knaresborough, where he stayed for the rest of his life.

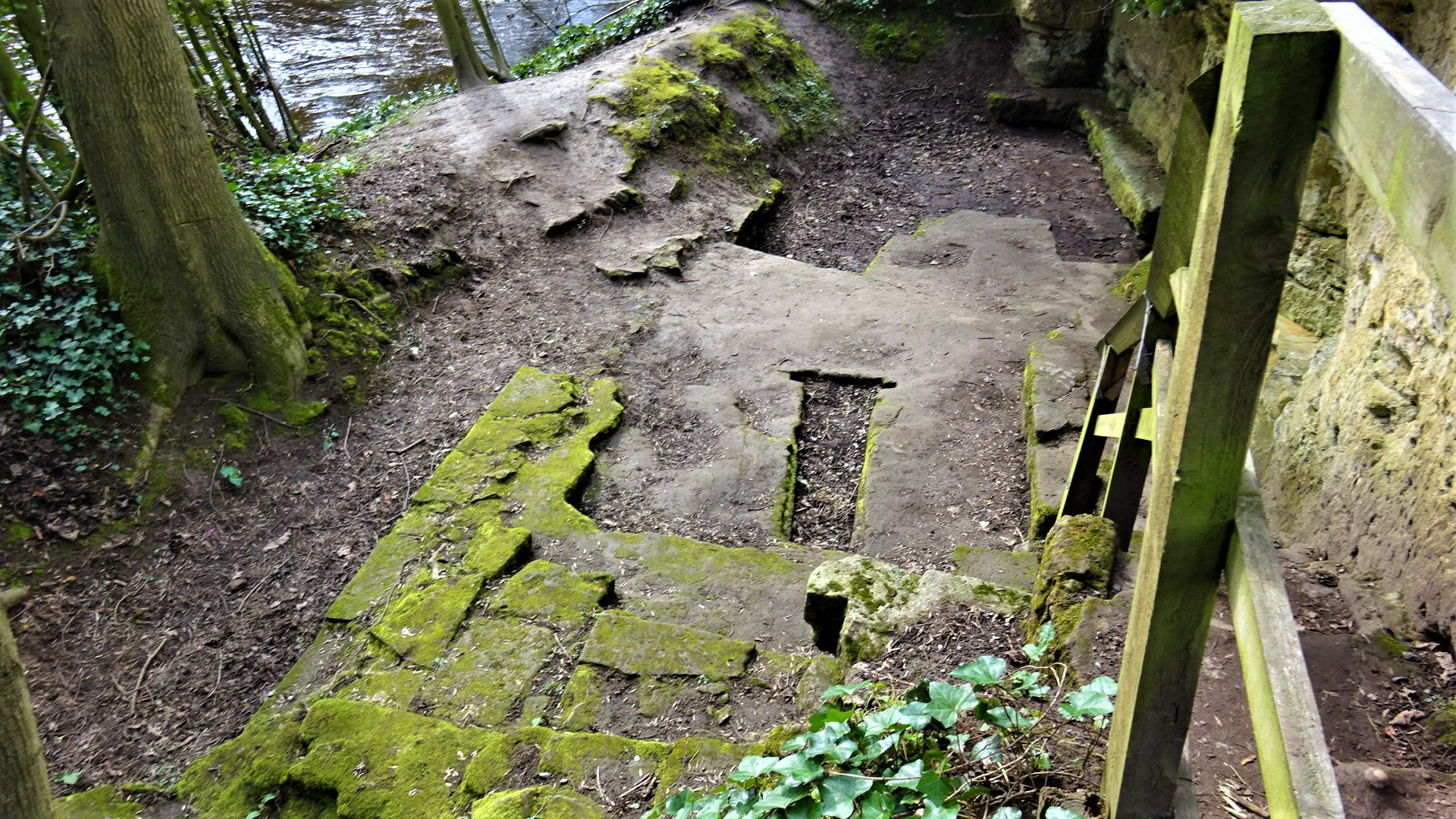
St Robert's grave and chapel

As a hermit, Robert survived on a simple diet of herbs, roots and water. Although living as a recluse, his piëty soon attracted followers and gifts from local benefactors, gifts that included land alongside the river. A number of stories of St Robert exist both in Latin and early English verse. One concerns his complaining about the King's deer eating his crops. Sir William, making fun of the saint, invites Robert to catch the offending beasts. Robert manages not only to herd the deer into his barn as if they were a tame flock of sheep but also harnesses them to his plough and sets them to work.

Robert died on 24 September 1218. Before his death, St Robert established an order of Trinitarian Friars at Knaresborough Priory, but he warned them that, when his time came, the monks of Fountains Abbey would try to carry his body away to their own establishment. He urged his followers to resist them, which they did, and so St Robert was buried in his chapel cut from the steep rocky crags by the river, where, it was said, an oil flowed from his tomb; pilgrims came from near and far to be healed by it.

== St Robert's Cave ==
Robert lived in various places in the vicinity of Knaresborough before taking up residence in a cave by the river Nidd (then known as St Giles' Priory). It is said that King John visited him and Trinitarian friars also venerated him. His brother Walter, then Mayor of York, came and paid for some new buildings, including a chapel dedicated to the Holy Cross. The floorplan of this can still be seen alongside Robert's cave in Knaresborough.

== St Robert's Well ==
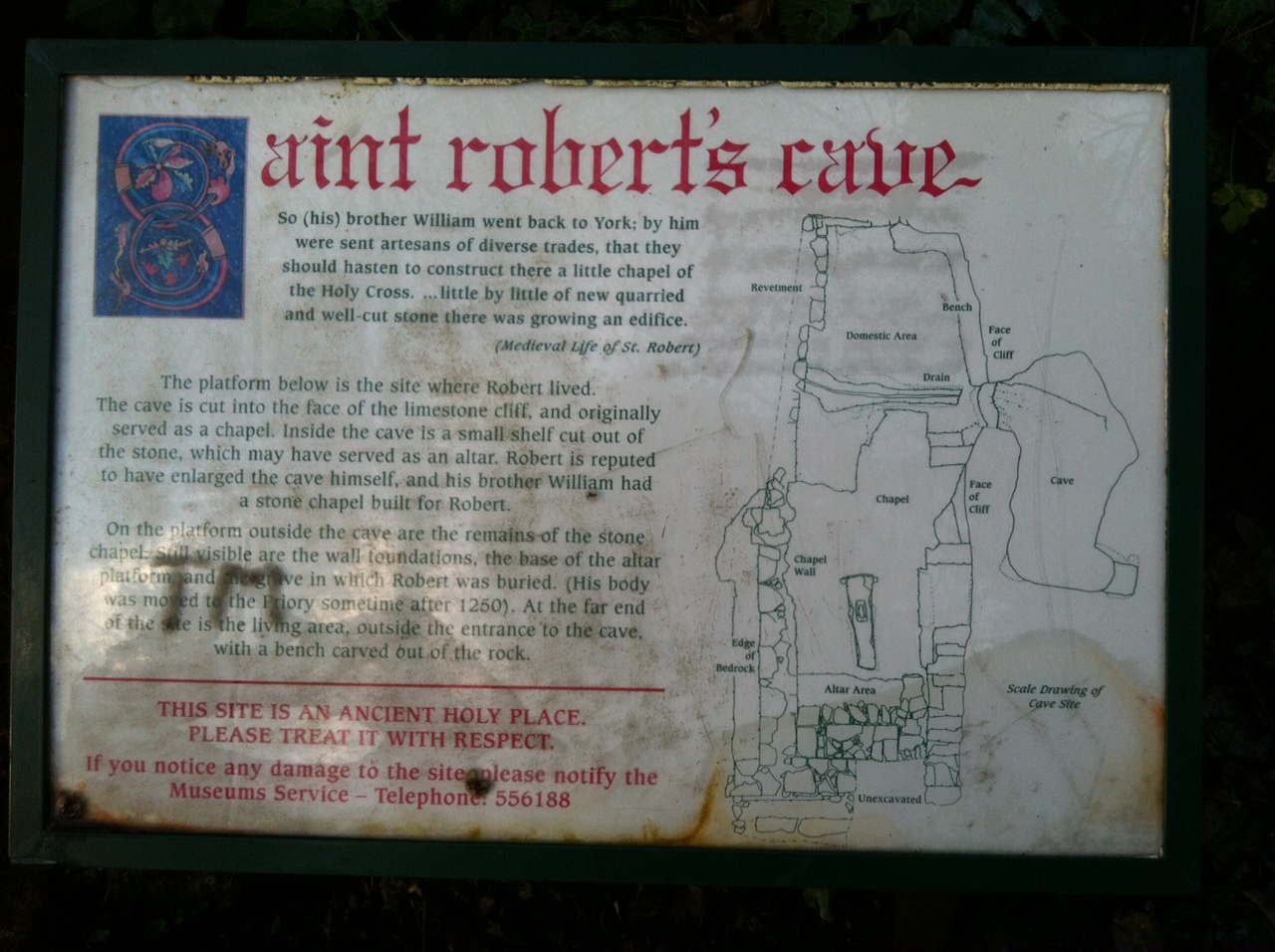
Sign at St Robert's Cave

Michael Calvert's History of Knaresborough (1844), describes St Robert's Well as being near the York Road, about one mile from the town. Calvert also writes that prior to 1791 it had been an open well about two feet deep, but in 1791 bathing facilities were built at the well because of its value as a cold bath. An 1850s OS map marks a "Cold Bath" near the York Road, as described by Calvert, and this site was connected by a track to St Robert's cave and chapel 400 m (1,300 ft) to the south-west.

The Monkswell business park was built on the site of St Robert's well or Cold Bath, where a well shaft preserves the site of the spring that fed it. Visitors drop coins (as well as litter) through the metal grid that covers the wellshaft.

== Cult ==
During his time living in Spofforth, Robert began attracting large crowd who praised him. At first fearful of this attention, he fled to Headley Priory. Upon returning to the wilderness, taking residence in Rudfarlington, he grew a small community of hermits. This community grew following his relocation to Knaresborough, and it began to be attested the he could perform miracles and tell prophecies.

Towards the end of his life, pilgrims flocked to see Robert to seek spiritual guidance and to be healed of physical ailments. Although Robert was not a Trinitarian, his following originated a Trinitarian community in Knaresborough. By the time of his death, this following had become a cult, after which management was adopted by the Trinitarian Order,

== Veneration ==
The earliest religious order to venerate Robert was likely the Cistercians, recorded in the thirteenth century text MS Harley 3775. The Trinitarian Order too venerated Robert, as well as recording his life multiple times. The three records known were written in Latin prose, Latin verse and Middle English verse. Both orders portrayed his life uniquely based on his ties to their own tradition: the Cistercians emphasising Robert's hermetic nature; the Trinitarian emphasising his charismatic nature. Trinitarians recorded two separate interpretations of Robert's life: the first meant to be circulated internally within the order, minimising his care for the poor and emphasising his spirituality; the other intended to be circulated outside of the order, emphasising his charity work, and encouraging others to take up a similar lifestyle.

Acclaimed as a saint through popular acclaim, neither the Church of England nor the Roman Catholic Church have officially canonised St Robert. His feast day is the anniversary of his death, the 24th of September. Seven stained-glass panels of his life, originally from Dale Abbey, survive at St Matthew's Church in Morley, Derbyshire.

== Legacy ==
St Robert is often listed among the most influential Knaresborians, alongside prophetess Ursula Southeil and civil engineer John Metcalf.

St Robert's Cave, carved into the limestone of the Nidd Gorge, is now a Grade II* listed building and is accessible to the public. The small chapel, evidence of a small living area, and the location of St Robert's tomb are all that survive.

In North Yorkshire a small number of churches are dedicated to St Robert. These include the 14th century parish church in Pannal and a Roman Catholic church in Harrogate.
