= Knaresborough Priory =

Former monastic house in North Yorkshire

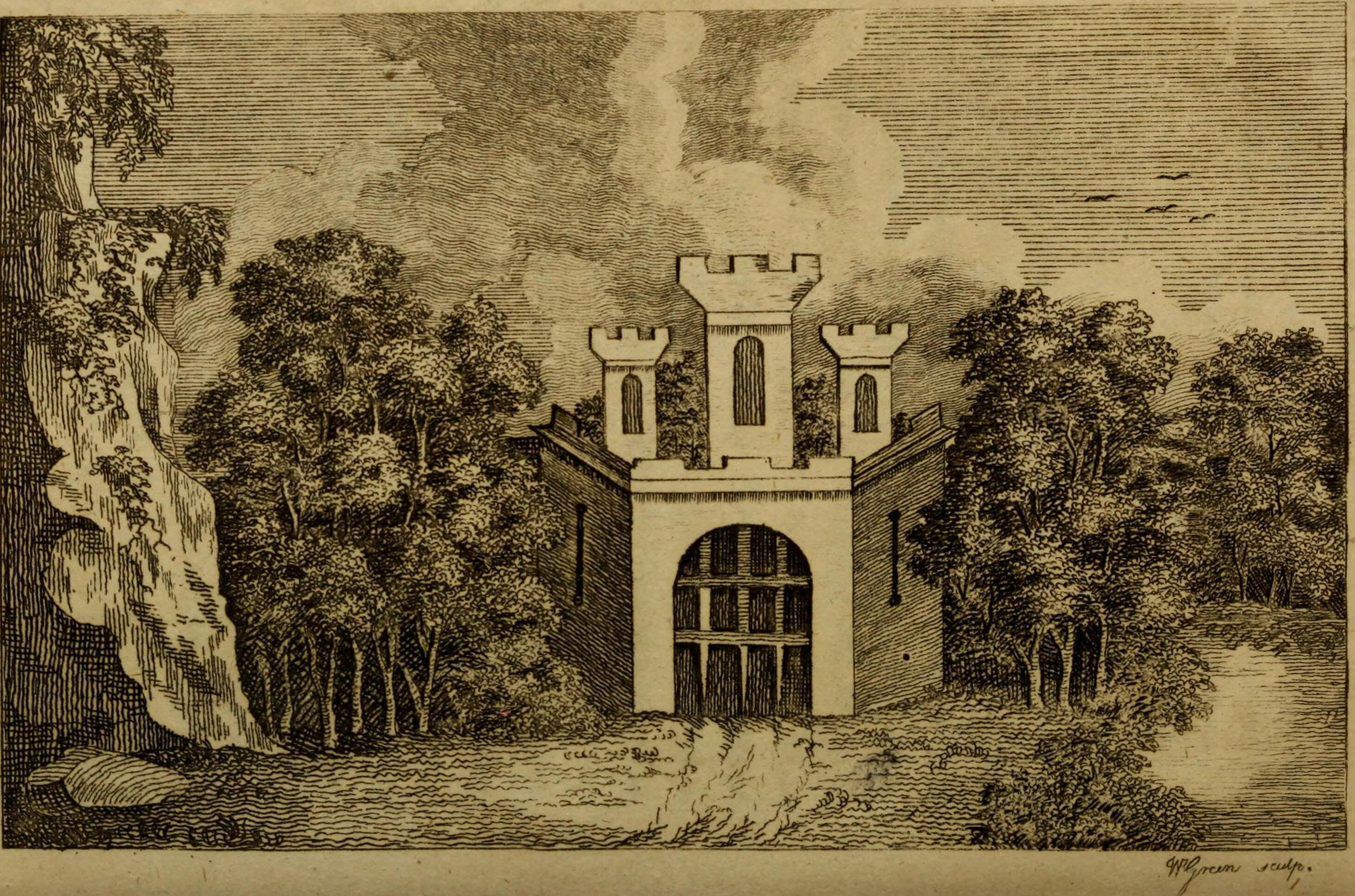
- The Gateway of the Priory at Knaresborough
- Interactive map of Knaresborough Priory

Monastery information
- Order: Trinitarian
- Denomination: Christian
- Established: c. 1257
- Disestablished: 1538

Site
- Location: Knaresborough, North Yorkshire
- Country: England
- Coordinates: 53.995°N 1.457°W

Knaresborough Priory was a Trinitarian House in the town of Knaresborough, North Yorkshire, England. The priory at Knaresborough was the only Trinitarian house in the entire Yorkshire region. The house was founded c. 1257 and dissolved in 1538.

== History ==
The priory had its roots in Knaresborough when Robert of Knaresborough, who was said to have been the son of Toki Flos, once the Lord Mayor of York in the 12th century, created a hermitage at Rudfarlington. (Note: Robert was said to have been born in 1159 to Took Floure, or Tockless Flower, and Robert himself is described as being named Robert Flower.) Originally intending to be a Cistercian monk, Robert set about being a hermit (although he had servants) and devoted his time to god. In 1216, King John is recorded as having instructed his constable in the West Riding, Brian de L'Isle, to award Robert with half a carucate of woodland as close as possible to his hermitage. However, the landowner William de Stuteville subjected Robert to attacks at his hermitage, so he sought refuge in a cave on the north bank of the River Nidd, just south of Knaresborough, where his brother paid to have a chapel built. In the 13th century, c. 1257, a priory of the Trinitarian order (or The Order of the Holy Trinity for the Redemption of Captives (Note: The order was founded in France in 1197, and they were also occasionally referred to as Maturines, and locally as The Robertines, named in honour of Robert of Knaresborough.)) was founded at the site of the caves by Richard of Cornwall, and the monks inherited Robert of Knaresborough's hermitage and effects, which according to Hunter Blair was odd as "he, [Robert of Knaresborough] did not found any Trinitarian houses and does not appear to have had contact with the order during his lifetime."

The priory was the only Trinitarian house within the Yorkshire region, and was also conferred with the right of advowson upon the churches in Hampsthwaite, Fewston, Pannal and Whixley. The order also owned a mill to the east of the priory on the bend of the River Nidd (at 53.9967°N 1.4517°W) known as Abbey Mill.

The priory was sacked and destroyed by Scottish Raiders in 1318, and then also suffered under the Black Death when the number of friars totalled just five in 1360, although they recovered a little by 1375 when they numbered eleven. When the priory was dissolved in December 1538, the last prior was Thomas Kent, and the house was valued at £35, 10s and 11d, making it one of the poorest houses in Yorkshire during the Dissolution. One of the priory's bells is thought to have been given to the Church of All Saints, Spofforth, during the Reformation. Stone from the priory was re-used in barns and walls in the immediate area.

== See also ==
- List of monastic houses in North Yorkshire
- List of monastic houses in England
