= Wallace's Cave, Auchinleck =

Building in East Ayrshire, Scotland

Wallace's Cave
- Wallace's Grotto
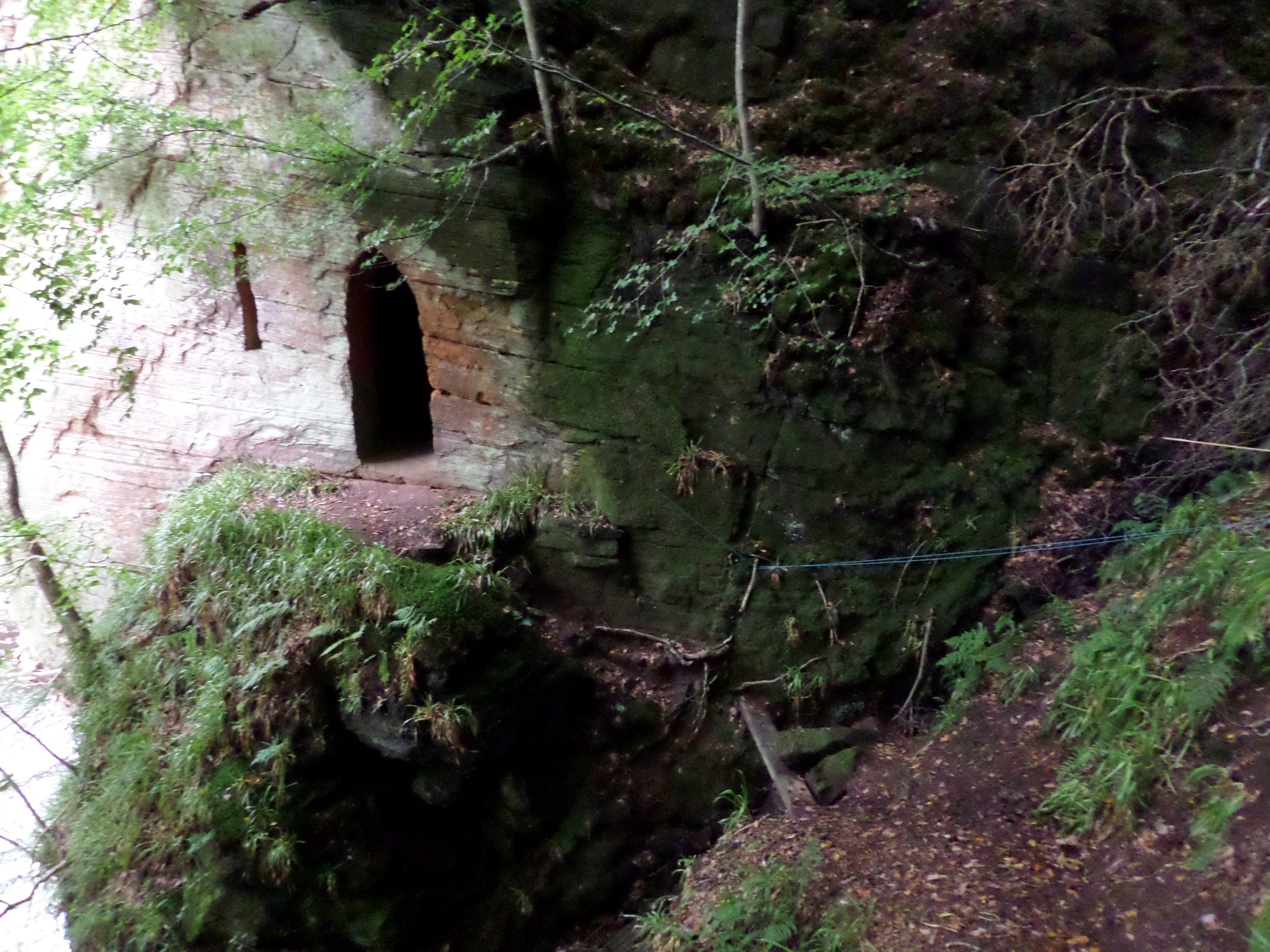
- The cave entrance and window
- Interactive map of Wallace's Cave
- Location: Auchinleck, East Ayrshire
- OS grid: NS498233
- Coordinates: 55°28′50″N 4°22′39″W
- Length: 12 feet (3.7 m)
- Elevation: 40 feet (12 m)
- Entrances: 1

Wallace's Cave is an 18th-century grotto on the grounds of Auchinleck House in East Ayrshire, Scotland. It shows superior workmanship and is possibly an enlargement of a pre-existing cave. It lies in the gorge of the Lugar Water, downstream of its confluence of the Dippol Burn, and is reached via a cliffside path. Access is now hazardous due to the condition of the path and the vertical drop into the river.

The cave is B-listed.

== Cave and access ==
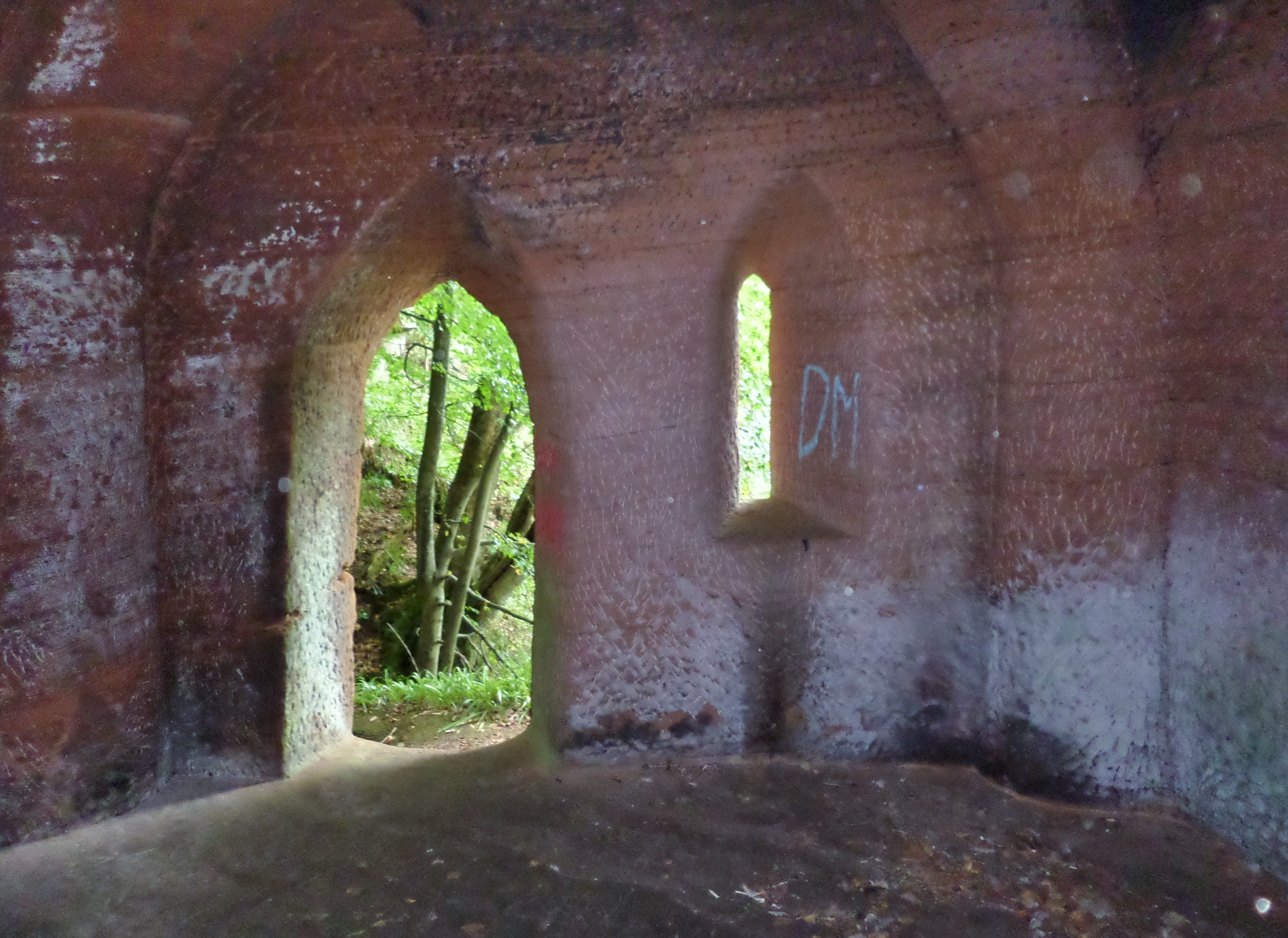
The interior of Wallace's Cave

The cave is reached via a narrow path and some rock-cut steps that follow the Lugar Water. Lying in a side gorge cut by a small burn, the final approach requires the crossing of the burn. The masons' chisel marks are very clear on the walls. Their work created a chamber with a floor area of approximately 14 square feet and a height of approximately 10 feet. Prominent rib vaults rise from the four corners of the chamber and meet at the centre of the ceiling, creating the impression, deliberately or not, of a cross or saltire. The chamber is entered through a seven-foot-high doorway, now lacking a door, in the form of a pointed arch. There is a small, similarly shaped window to the left, as viewed from the outside. The window shows no obvious sign of having been glazed.

The eminent antiquarian John Smith visited the area circa 1895, recording historic sites but making no reference to the two caves on the estate. It has been suggested that this or a previous cave dates from the late 13th or 14th century. Warrick, writing in 1899, makes no reference to Wallace's Cave at this site although he mentions one near Lugar in the Cubs' Glen on the Glenmuir Water.

John Thomson's map of 1832 does not mark the cave; however, the natural feature Kemp's Castle and the ruins of Ochiltree Castle and Auchinleck Castle are shown. The 1857 OS map shows a path leading to the site with no cave indicated; however, by 1896 it is recorded. The 1908 map records the cave, but the access path is no longer shown.

== History ==
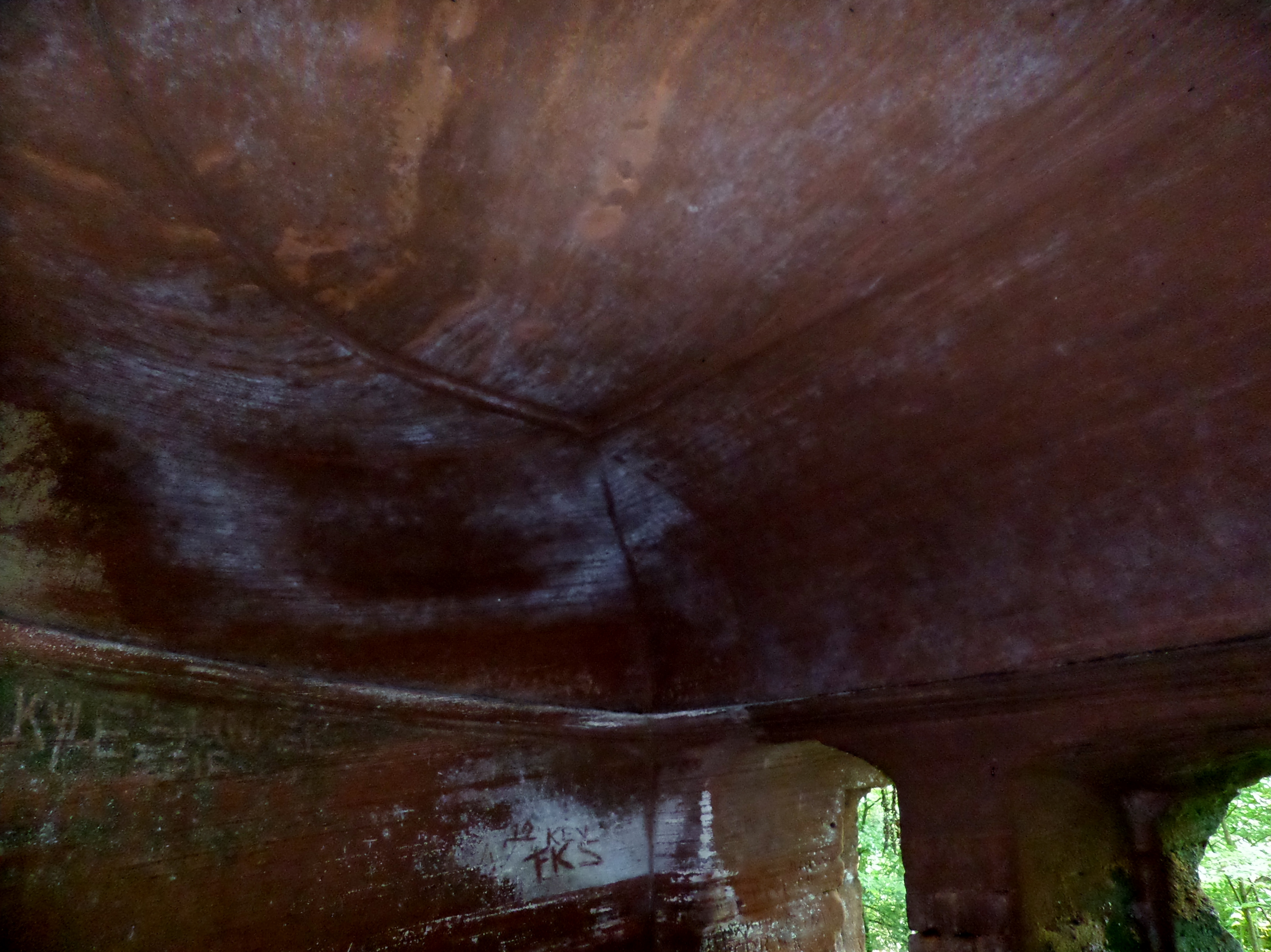
The interior of Boswell's Summerhouse

The cave has been estimated as dating from around 1760, having been hewn from soft red sandstone in the Gothic style as a man-made folly or grotto, although the possibility remains that it was an extension of a natural cave. The RCAHMS Canmore site classifies the site as post-medieval and holds no details of the grotto. There is another grotto known as "Boswell's Summerhouse" further up the Dippol Burn. The two were presumably hewn at the same time to enhance the picturesque landscape laid out around the new Auchinleck House.

The original Auchinleck Castle stands upstream of the cave. It was common practice during times of war or unrest to hide valuables, charters, etc. in safe locations, and it is possible that Wallace's Cave may have been first made for this purpose, as was the case with Bruce's Cave at Kirkpatrick Fleming.

The first laird of Auchinleck on record was Nicol de Achethlec, who was a great supporter of Scottish independence and is said to have been related to Sir William Wallace. It is known that Nicol rode with Wallace to Glasgow and fought with him against the English in the "Battle of the Bell of the Brae". It has been surmised that the grotto's name patriotically commemorates Auchinleck's association with the national hero.

== Micro-history ==
A visitor to one of the caves in circa 1947 describes a walk that takes him to "a staircase of broad wooden steps built into the steep bank, but so deep in leaves that the stepping places were hard to distinguish. It led down to the water's edge, and gave access to a large cave hewn in the solid rock. A fine dry apartment it was, and to sit on the carved ledge and watch the wagtails dipping from stone to stone, the burn clear as a sheet of crystal, was most restful." This may refer to Boswell's Summerhouse.

== Other Wallace's Cave sites ==
- A rock shelter near Lugar, East Ayrshire in the Cubs' Glen on the Glenmuir Water.
- On the opposite side of the River Ayr from Wallace's Heel Well; it is said that Wallace used it to hide from English troops. No sign of it remains.
- Bothwell Parish on the South Calder Water, Lanarkshire, to the west of Cleland and close to the site of the old Ravenscraig steelworks.
- A natural cave in the Cartland Craigs, South Lanarkshire (NS 8691 4454) ravine.
- Corra Linn near New Lanark, Lanarkshire.
- A Wallace's Cave or Hawthornden Castle Cave exists in Roslin Glen, Midlothian, The castle stands nearby and the patriot took part in the Battle of Roslin on 24 February 1303.
- Crawhill in Lothian, said to have been used by him after the Battle of Falkirk.

== See also ==
- Bickering Bush
- Cleeves Cove
- Dunton Cove
- The Holy Cave, Hunterston
- Peden's Cave (Auchinbay)
