= The Holy Cave, Hunterston =

Cave in North Ayrshire, Scotland

The Holy Cave
- Hawking Craig Cave
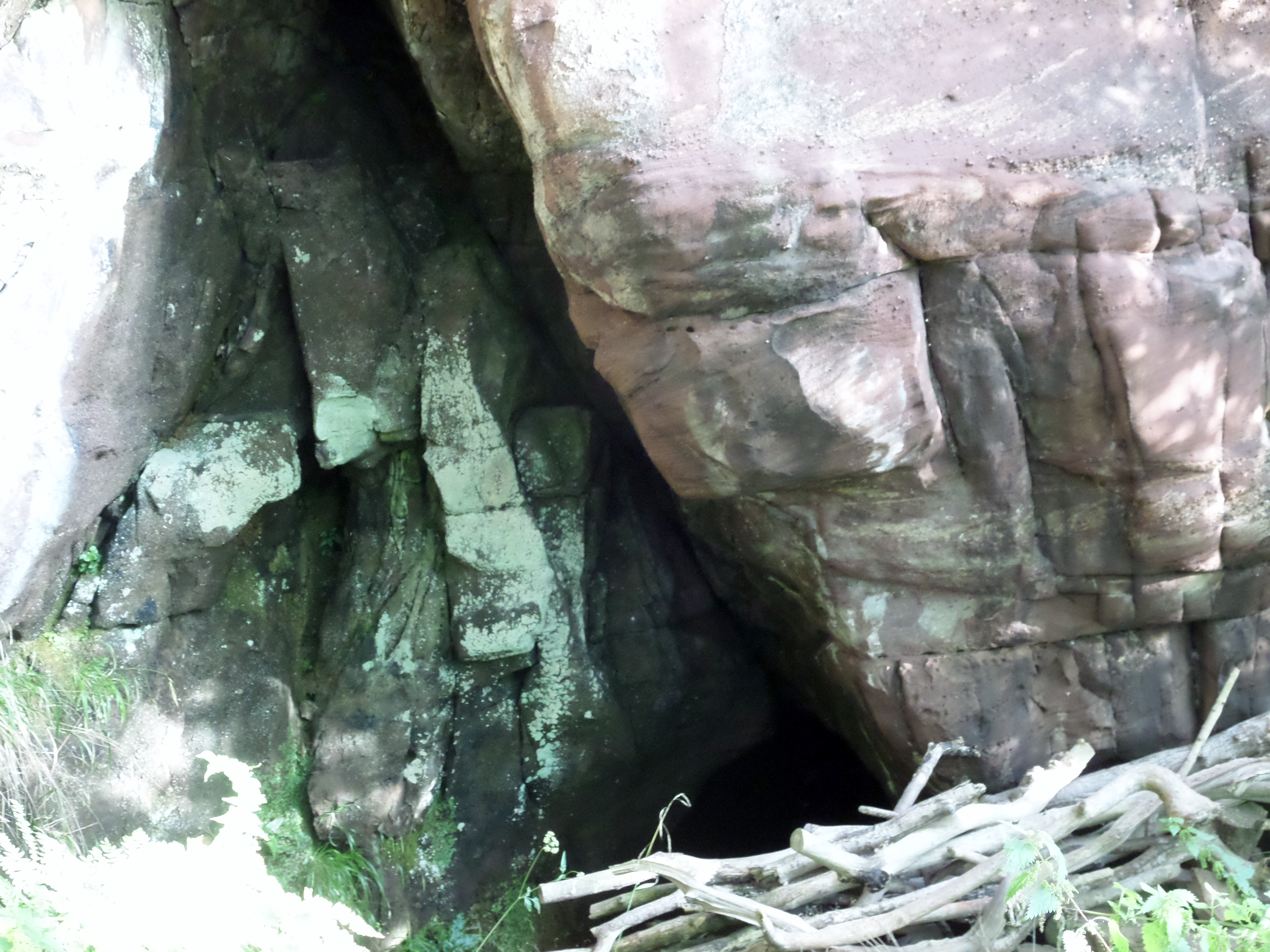
- The opening to the Holy Cave
- Interactive map of The Holy Cave
- Location: Hunterston, North Ayrshire
- OS grid: NS 1794 5079
- Coordinates: 55°42′58″N 4°53′59″W
- Length: 27 feet (8.2 m)
- Elevation: 10 feet (3.0 m)
- Entrances: 1
- Difficulty: Caution required
- Hazards: Access to site
- Access: By rough path

The Holy Cave at Hunterston in the Parish of West Kilbride is associated with Saint Mungo, also known as St Kentigern. It is often referred to as the Hawking Craig Cave; however two caves exist in the Hawking Craig Wood and 'Three Sisters' area of the cliffs, the other being Smith's Cave, better described as a rock shelter lying a short distance to the south. The main cave has been excavated, and the finds indicate three periods of occupation over many centuries.

== Cave and access ==
The cave stands about 300 yards from the northern end of the red sandstone cliffs and was formed by wave action working at a weak point, a fissure, at the base of red sandstone cliffs that run from the Brigurd Point to Portencross; however it now stands about 10 feet (3.0 m) above the level of the old raised beach that runs down to the sea. The cave is not very large (6 feet (1.8 m) high, 6 feet (1.8 m) wide and about 27 feet (8.2 m) long.) It is currently best accessed by entering the Hawking Craig Wood near the 'Three Sisters' cliffs and carefully walking along the base of the escarpment.

== The Wishing or Holy Well ==
A spring known as the 'Wishing Well' was located near the rock shelter or cave. One reference states that this deep well is actually located within the cave or at the entrance. The name 'Wishing Well' has been interpreted as deriving from Saxon and meaning the "Wise man or Instructor's Well". The most popular time to visit the well was on the first Sunday in May when water was collected for its supposed curative properties, and it is further recorded that on occasions the local minister was persuaded to visit the well to baptise children using its holy water. The well's name also implies the common practice of making wishes and offerings of coins and other items.

== History and excavation ==
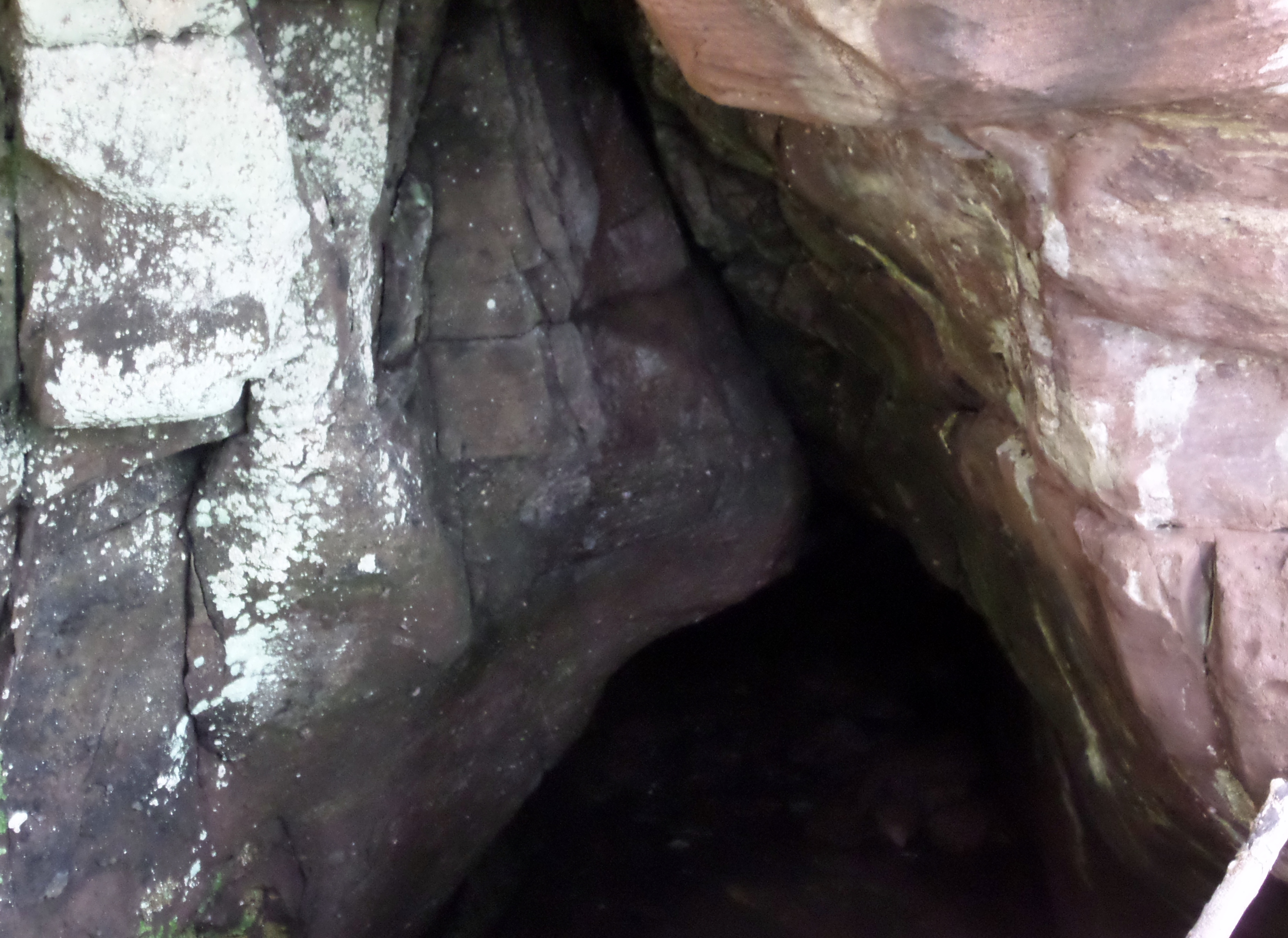
The entrance to the Holy Cave.

When it was first excavated in 1879, the cave was measured at 27 ft long and 6 ft high and wide for 15 ft to the rear. The excavation went down to a depth of 6 ft before hitting bedrock and three levels were discernible, each made up of layers of well-trodden ashes and seashells, the first at 18 in, a second at 30in, and the basal layer at 39ins deep. Many bones were found, including deer, cat, pig, horse, sheep, goat, ox, and rabbit bones. The horse bones were found between the upper and second level with dog bones between the middle and basal levels.

A significant find was a bone object with a rectangular hole at one end found on the second level and a flint object was found just above the basal level. An object made of slate was found. Some pottery fragments were found including a coarse, unglazed, reddish appearance and a thinner example with a green-brown glaze similar to Scottish Medieval pottery. The National Museum of Scotland holds the bone implements and some pottery fragments (Accession Numbers. HM 3-4).

A shelter would most likely have once existed at the cave entrance although no recognisable signs survive of concavities etc used to support such an arrangement. Some apparent man-made workings on the rock face exist close by; however, there is an absence of religious symbols or graffiti of any kind. However, the soft red sandstone is easily eroded by rain and wind action, and any such markings may have been lost even if they ever existed.

The Ardeer Cave

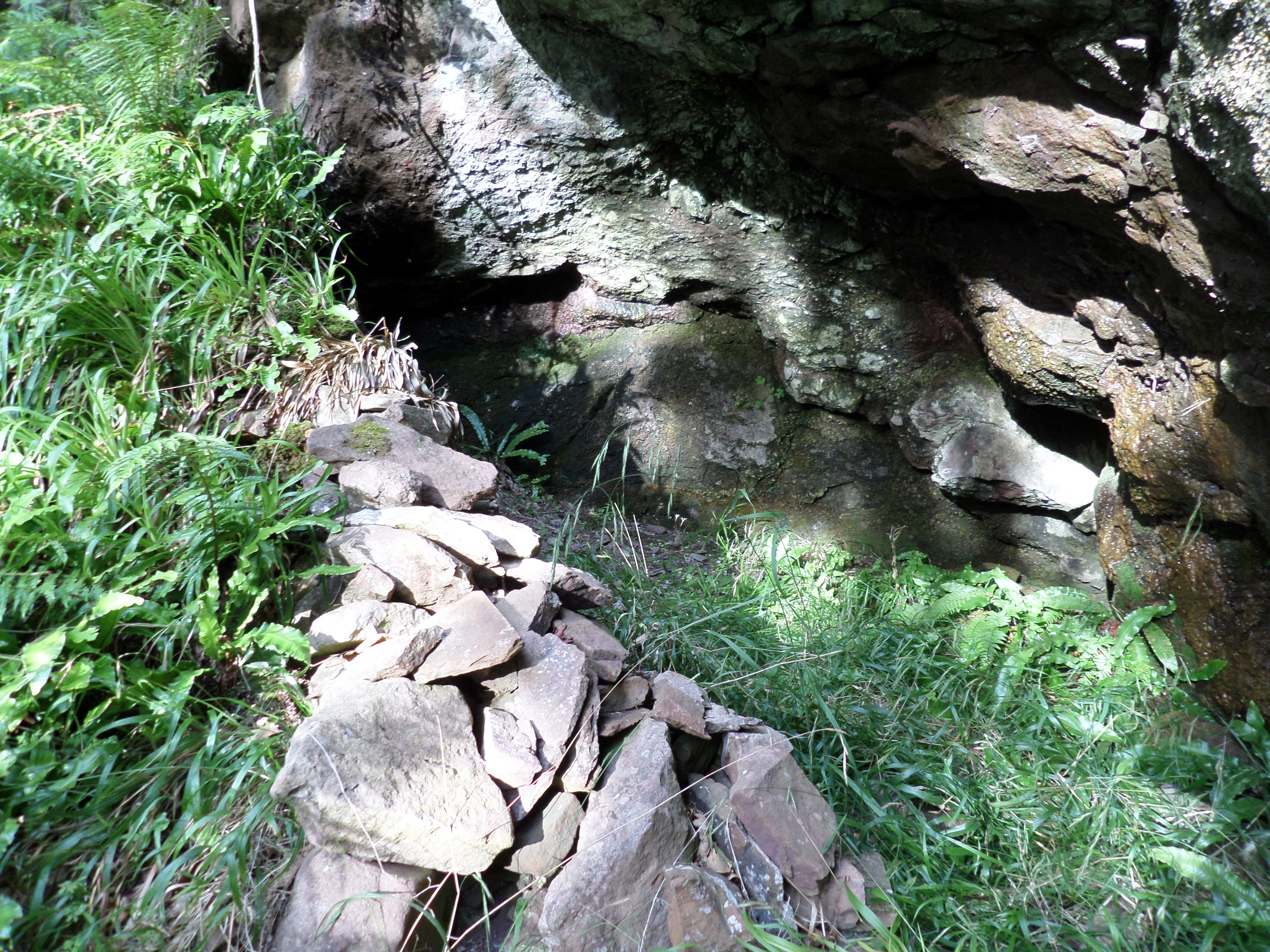
Smith's Cave or rock shelter at the Hawking Craig.

A cave exists near the site of the old Ardeer House in Stevenston. Until covered over the remains of a dressed stone frame formed an iron grille over a hole in the cave roof suggesting its use as a grotto in the 19th century. The visible remains suggested a souterrain, but the near absence of records of these in south-west Scotland make this unlikely. The passage is lined with corbelled drystone walling, roofed with capstones, and leads into a natural cave section which may have been formed by wave action as it shows a water-scour likely to have been created by wave action. Some areas of undisturbed stratified deposits have been found, together with evidence of occupation, such as a hearth, bones, and a fragment of glass.

St Molaise's Cave

A similar cave or rock shelter survives on Holy Island (off the east coast of Arran) where Saint Molaise, an early Irish saint and abbot of Old Leighlin in Co. Carlow, who is supposed to have lived in the 6th and 7th centuries. Parallels can also be drawn with Saint Ninian's Cave at Glasserton in Dumfries and Galloway.

== Micro-history ==
The name 'Hawking Craig' refers to the medieval practice of collecting young sparrowhawks and goshawks for the sport of falconry.

The famous Hunterston Brooch was found by workmen at the Hawking Craig in 1826.

Prior to the Battle of Largs in 1263 a skirmish is said to have taken place on the raised beach area in front of the cave and a cairn or cairns once stood here that were said to be the graves of Vikings killed during the engagement. Wilson records in the early 19th century seeing several graves made of six stones that only contained ashes and a large cairn at the base of the cliff where the skirmish took place in which coins were found. These were removed when the author was a boy. Local legend has it that three sisters, Meg, Jean and Lizzie, were witches and whipped up the storm that caused such havoc amongst King Haco's fleet. The 'Three Sisters' are named for them.

== See also ==
- Cleeves Cove
- Dunton Cove
- Peden's Cave (Auchinbay)
