= Anima locus =

Concept of the soul of a place

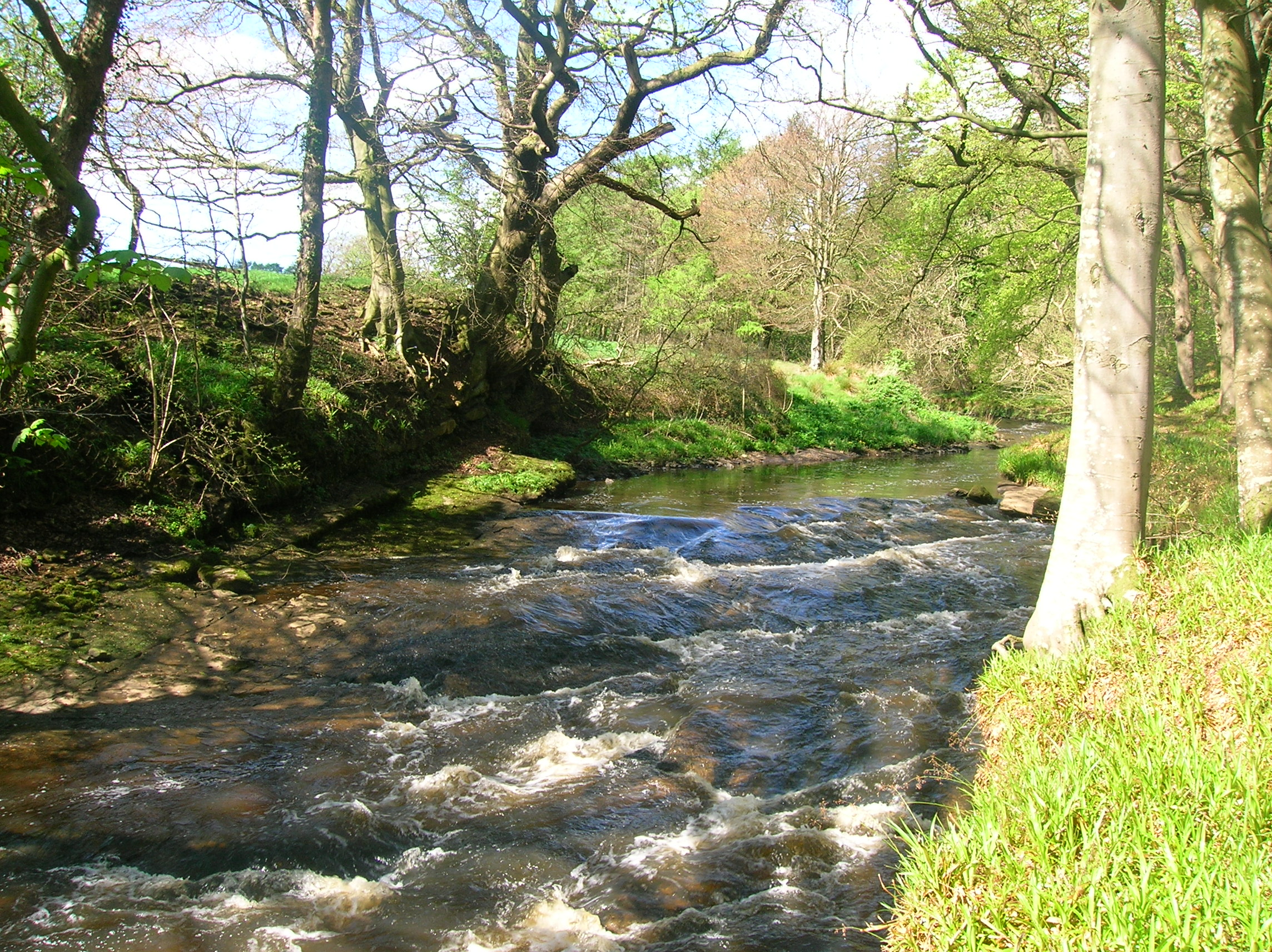
A dike on the Lugton Water near old Montgreenan castle.

The anima loci or animus loci is the "soul" of a place, its essential personality. A concept linked to the supernatural spirits of nature as residing in stones, springs, mountains, islands, trees, etc.

This practice is found in religions that have gods that may be more animal than man, like the Japanese Shinto. These beliefs are held throughout some modern religions too. Some of the Catholic Church has some beliefs like these. A country that follows these beliefs is Ireland, "there are several sites sacred to St. Patrick, but investigation has revealed that these were sites devoted to the worship of various Celtic gods and spirits long before the Catholic Church co-opted the location."

== Witchcraft ==
In witchcraft, the anima loci is often referred to a spirit of the place, sprite, fairy, guardian.

== Sites with strong anima loci ==
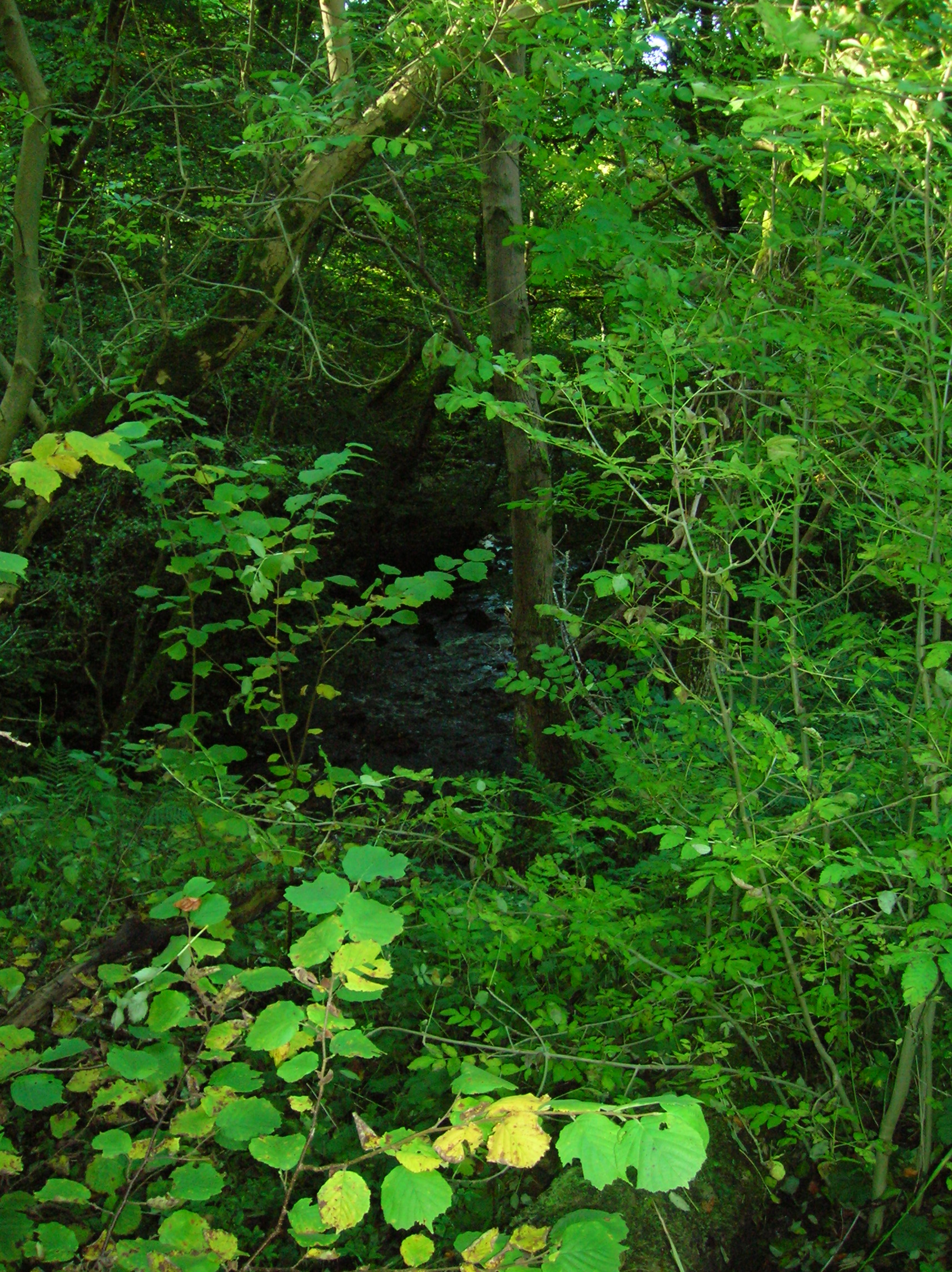
A view taken in the Dusk Water gorge from the Cleeves Cove cave.

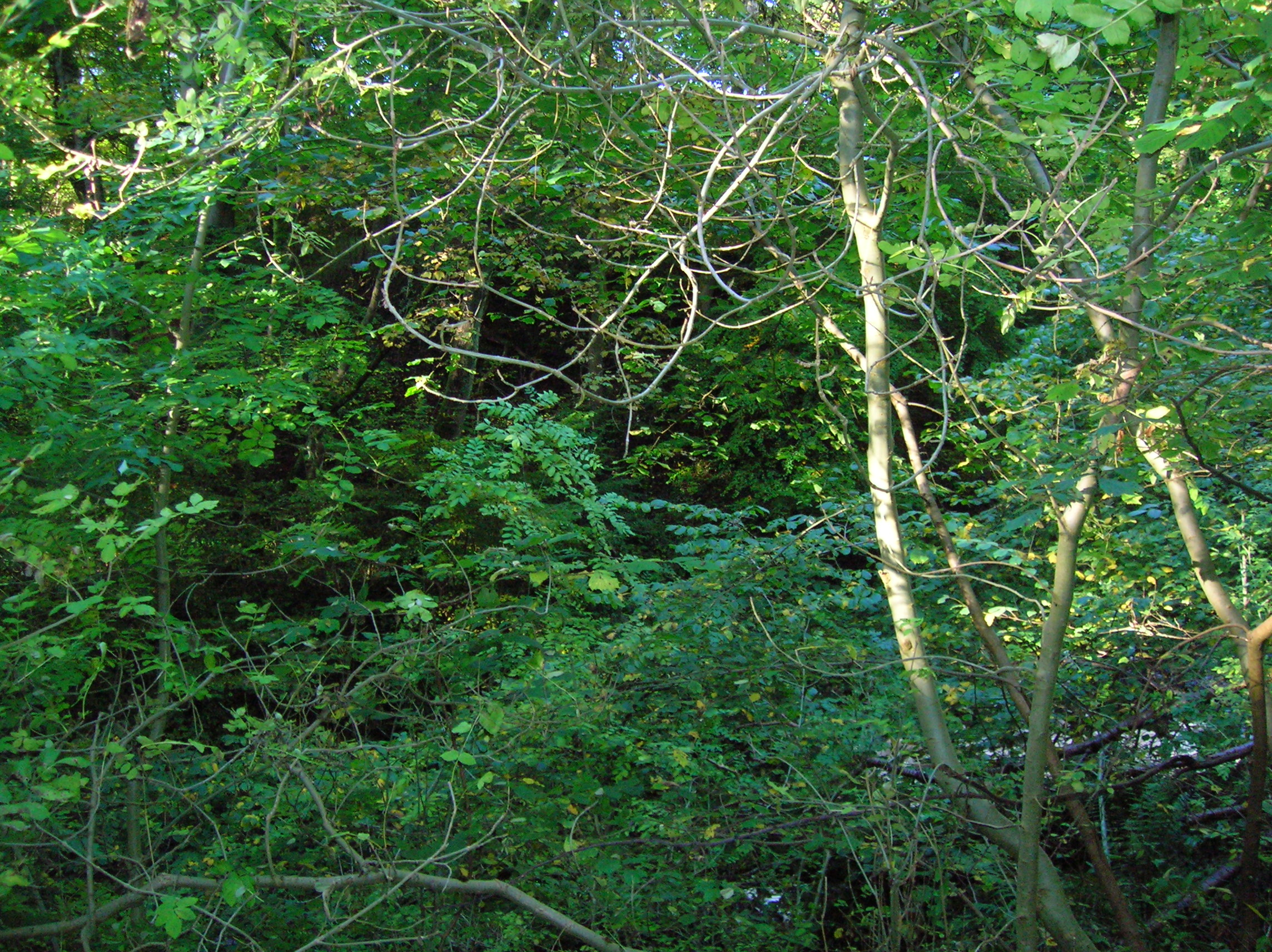
A view taken in the Dusk Water gorge from the Cleeves Cove cave.

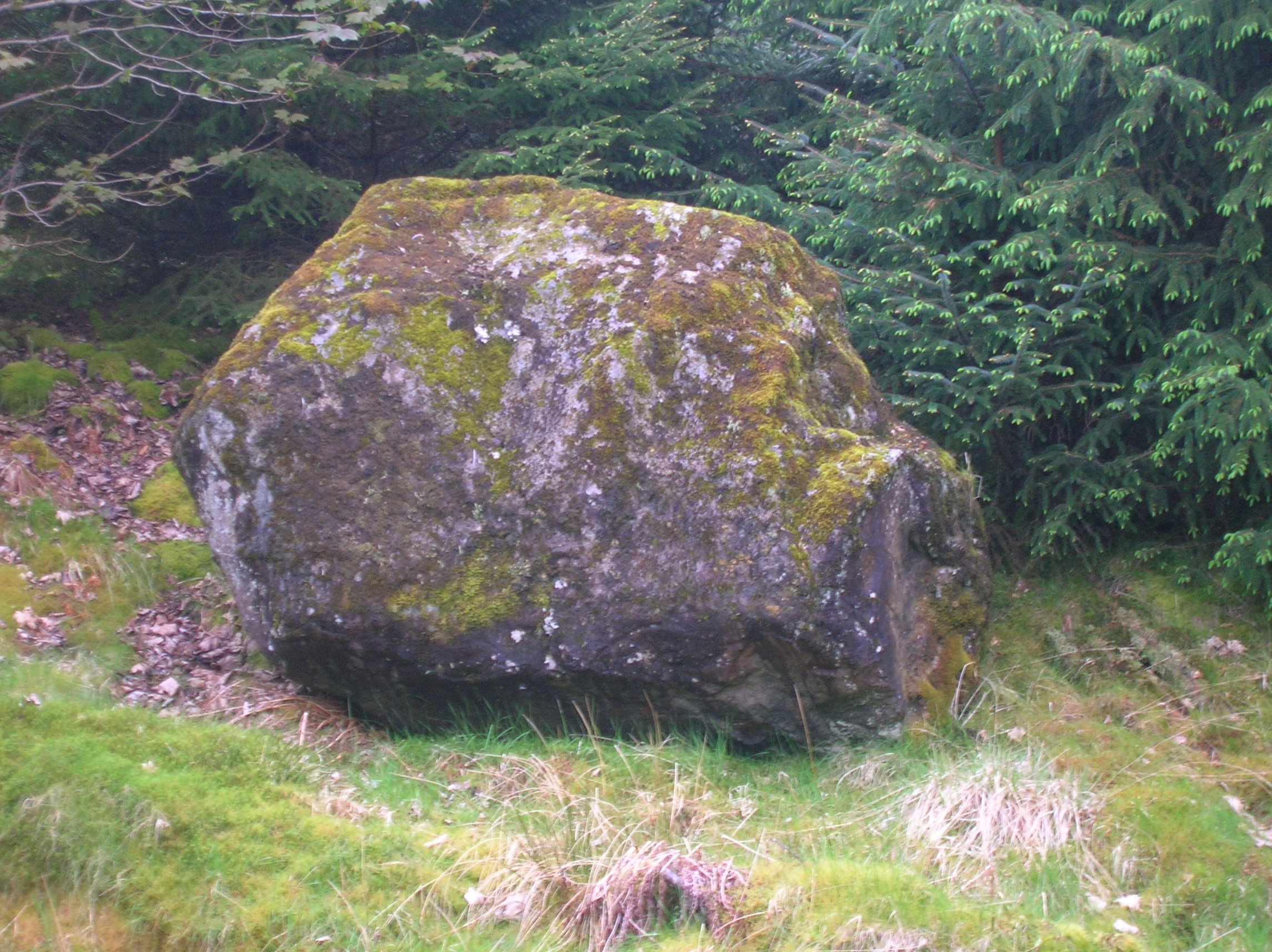
The Carlin stone near Craigends Farm, East Ayrshire, Scotland.

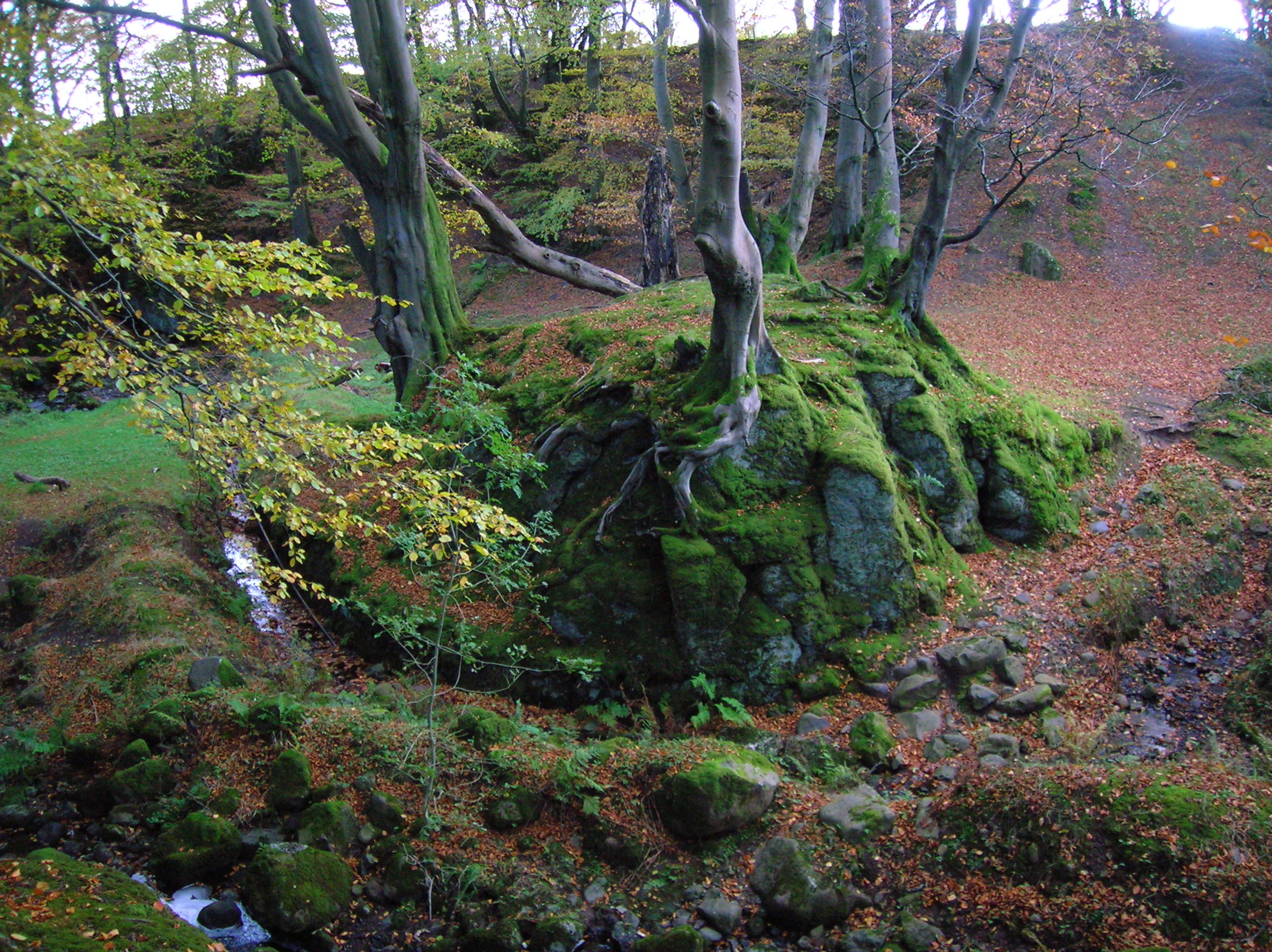
A semi-natural moot hill in the Giffordland Glen with old beech trees and the Auldmuir Burn.
