= Wallace's Cave =

Cave in Midlothian, Scotland

Coordinates: 55.8566°N 3.15078°W

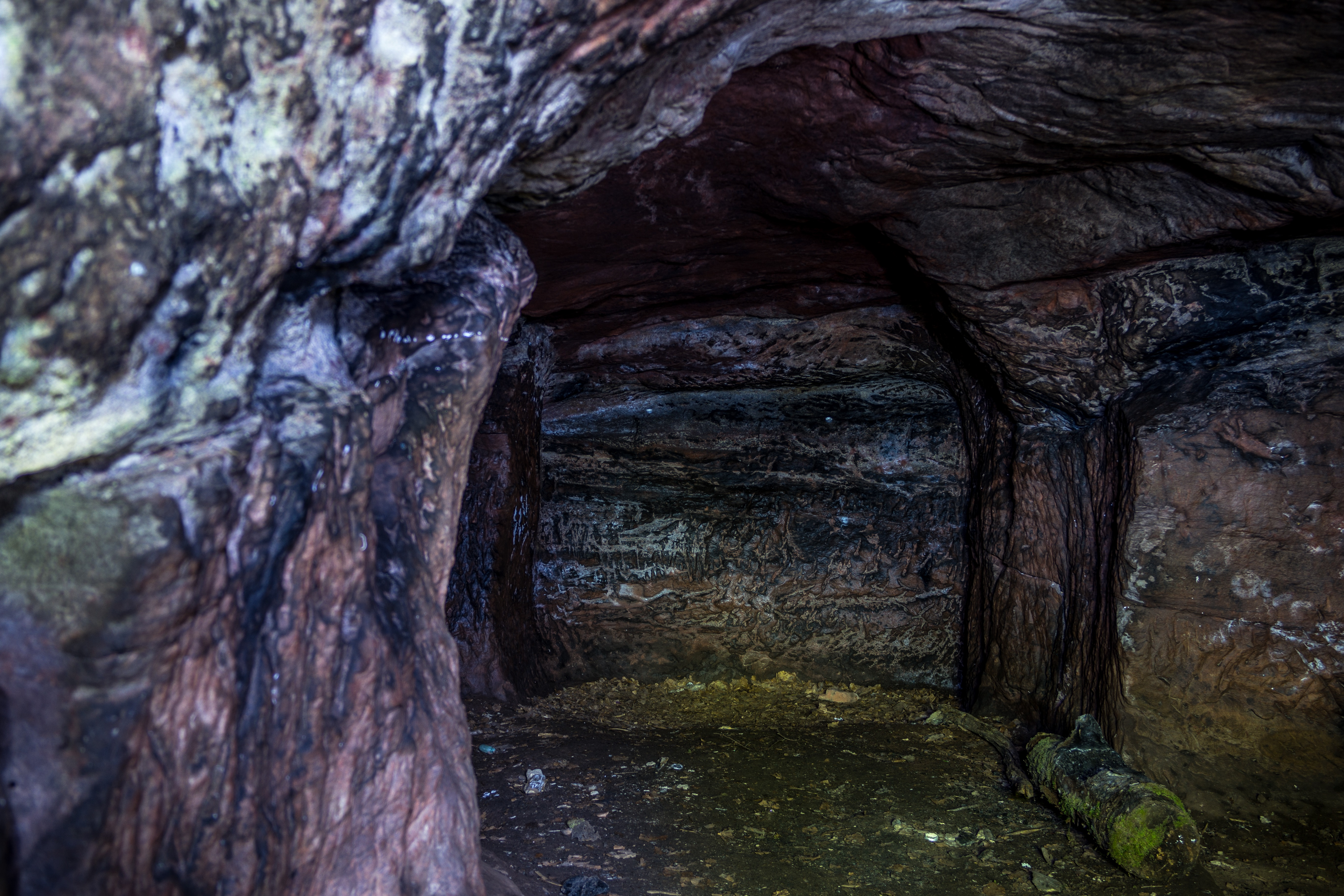
Wallace's Cave

Wallace's Cave is situated in Roslin Glen, in Midlothian, Scotland beside the River North Esk. It is also known as Hawthornden Castle Cave, after the nearby castle. It takes its name from William Wallace who participated in the Battle of Roslin, which took place nearby on 24 February 1303. The cave was formed under water from limestone between 363 and 325 million years ago.

== Other Wallace's Cave sites ==
- Wallace's Cave in Auchinleck, East Ayrshire
- A rock shelter near Lugar, East Ayrshire in the Cubs' Glen on the Glenmuir Water.
- On the opposite side of the River Ayr from Wallace's Heel Well; it is said that Wallace used it to hide from English troops. No sign of it remains.
- Bothwell Parish on the South Calder Water, Lanarkshire, to the west of Cleland and close to the site of the old Ravenscraig steelworks.
- A natural cave in the Cartland Craigs, South Lanarkshire (NS 8691 4454) ravine.
- Corra Linn near New Lanark, Lanarkshire.
- Crawhill in Lothian, said to have been used by him after the Battle of Falkirk.
