= Auchinleck House =

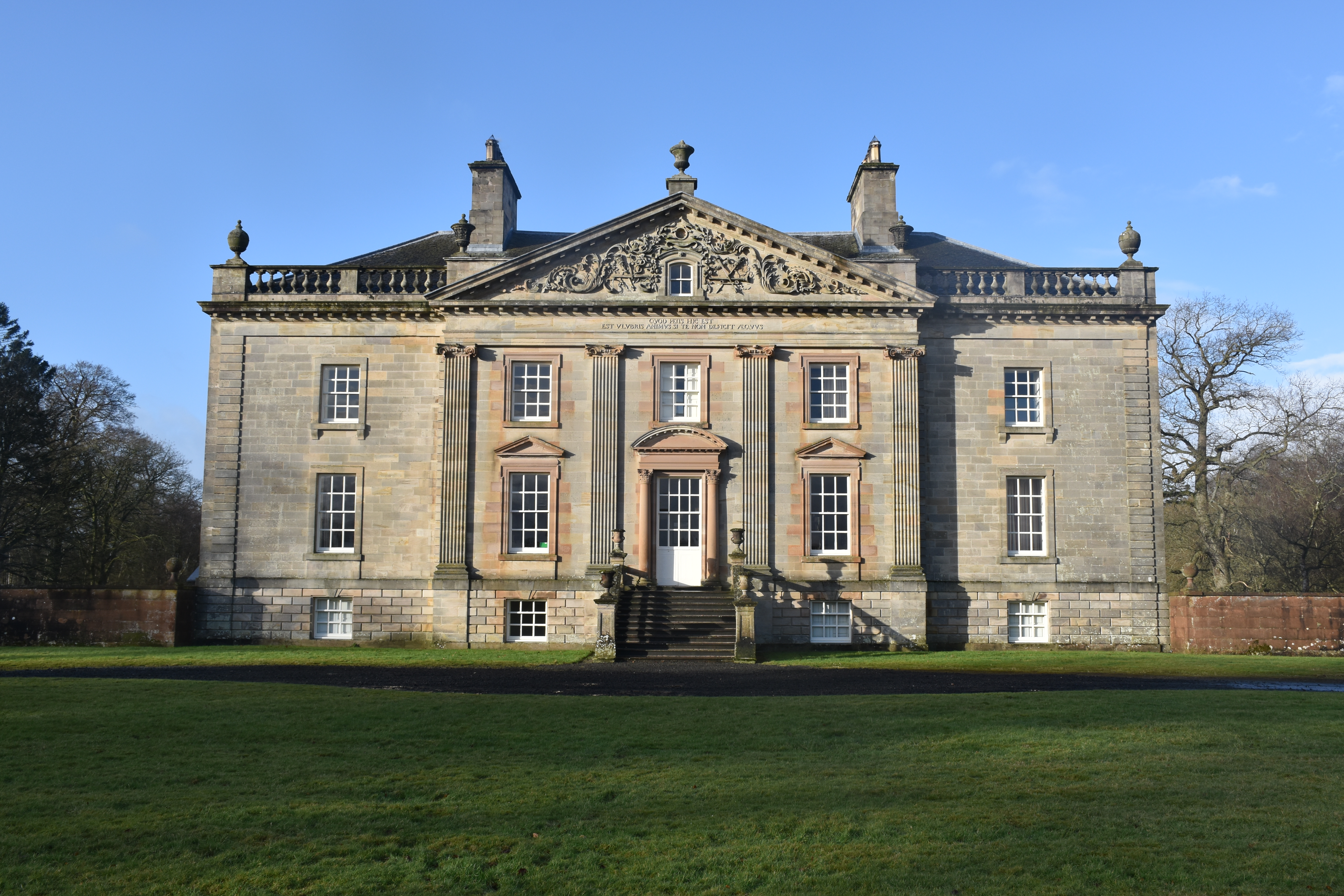
- The front facade of Auchinleck House in 2023

- Location in East Ayrshire
- 55.4781°N 4.3634°W

Listed Building – Category A
- Designated: 14 April 1971
- Reference no.: LB948

Scheduled monument
- Official name: Auchinleck Castle
- Designated: 1992
- Reference no.: SM5269

Scheduled monument
- Official name: Auchinleck Old House
- Designated: 1992
- Reference no.: SM5468

Auchinleck House is an 18th-century mansion in Scotland. It is situated near the town of Auchinleck near Cumnock and Ayr in East Ayrshire. The Auchinleck Estate has been inhabited since the 13th century, and the remains of Auchinleck Castle and Auchinleck Old House stand in the estate. The house is protected as a category A listed building, while the two ruined dwellings are scheduled monuments.

== History ==
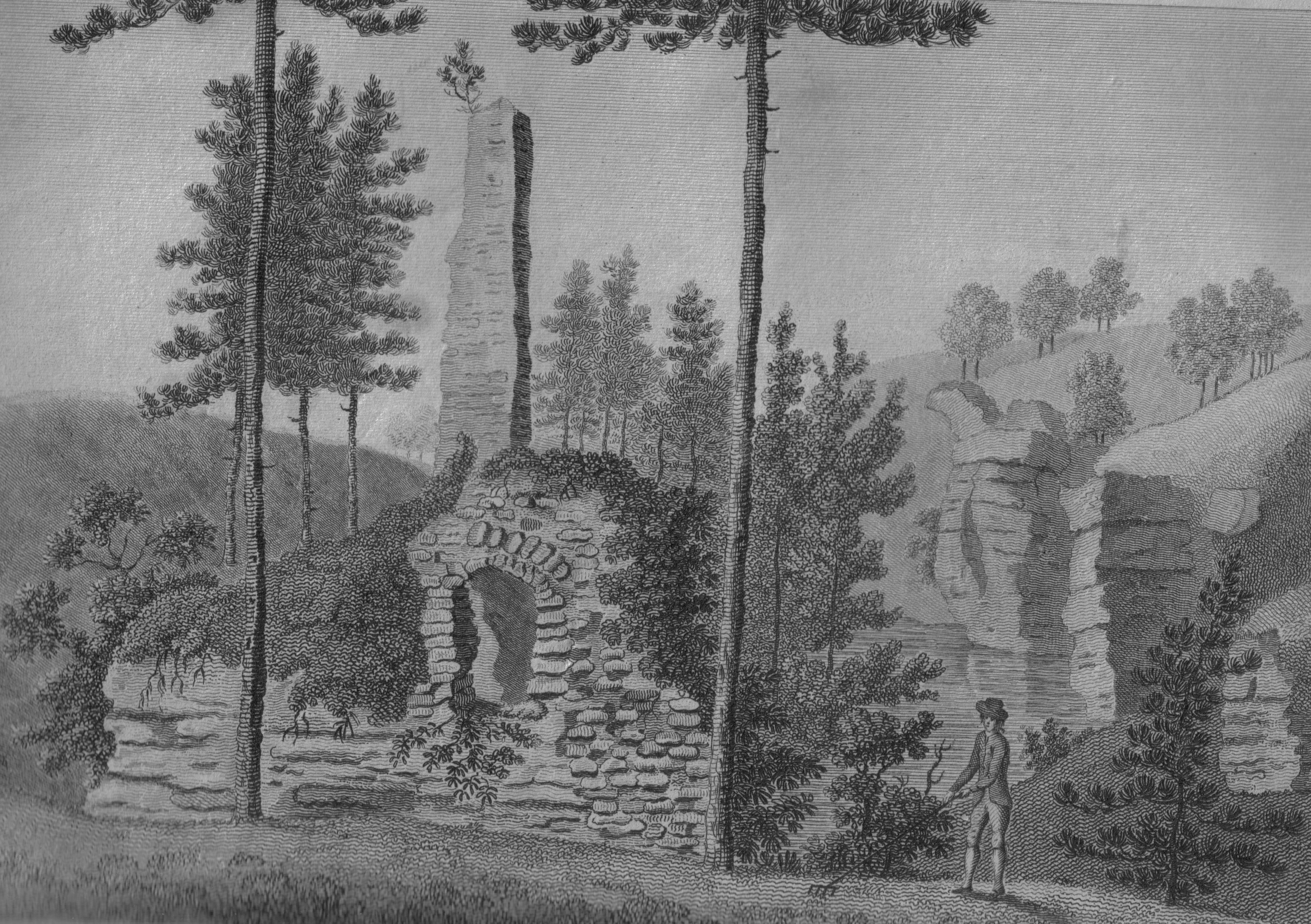
Auchinleck Castle

Auchinleck Castle was recorded as being extant in 1241. At that time, the castle was the seat of the Auchinlecks of that Ilk, who had held the barony since at least the 13th century and possibly earlier. The castle, and the barony, remained within the Auchinleck family until 1504 when due to a failing Auchinleck male line, and the marriage of a daughter of Sir John Auchinleck to a Thomas Boswell, the estate and the title were granted to Boswell by King James IV. Boswell assumed the title of laird from that date. It is not known when Auchinleck Castle ceased to be inhabited. The ruins still stand within the grounds of the Auchinleck estate, on the low sandstone cliff which overlooks the confluence of the River Lugar and the Dippol Burn.

=== The Boswells ===
In 1591 John Boswell was in trouble with the Privy Council for practising witchcraft, sorcery and enchantments, consulting with witches and taking part in other devilish activities. Richie Graham, the most notorious wizard of his day, admitted to having raised the Devil at Auchinleck. Boswell's response to these allegations was to flee the country.

Auchinleck Old House was built in 1612, and was the home of the Boswell family prior to the building of the current Auchinleck House. Again, the ruins are still standing within the estate.

The "new" Auchinleck House was built circa 1760 by Alexander Boswell, Lord Auchinleck, 8th Laird of Auchinleck. It later passed on to his son, James Boswell, the biographer of Samuel Johnson. Boswell and Johnson visited the house in 1773 on their way back from their journey to the Hebrides. In 1782, James Boswell became the 9th Laird of Auchinleck. His wife Margaret Boswell catalogued the houses's valuable library of books in 1783. The design of the house has been attributed to Robert Adam, although it may have been designed by Alexander Boswell himself.

=== Auchinleck House in the 20th century ===
During the Second World War, the then Laird of Auchinleck gave permission for Officers from the armies of Poland, Canada and France to live in Auchinleck House.

In 1986 the remains of the buildings were turned over to the Scottish Historic Buildings Trust by James Boswell, a descendant of the 18th-century Boswells. The Trust repaired the roof, and thus ensured the survival of the building. In 1999 Auchinleck House was bought by the Landmark Trust, a building preservation charity whose aim it is to "rescue historic and architecturally interesting buildings and their surroundings from neglect and, when restored, to give them new life by letting them for holidays." Now restored, Auchinleck House is used for holiday lets, and is occasionally open to the public.

== See also ==
- Wallace's Cave, Auchinleck
