= John Boswell (freemason) =

Scottish gentleman and one of the first Freemasons

John Boswell, 4th Laird of Auchinleck (1532?–1609), was a Scottish gentleman. He is considered by some scholars to be the first recorded non-operative Freemason.

== Biographical details ==
John Boswell, 3rd laird of Auchinleck was the son of David Boswell and Janet Hamilton. In 1562 he married Christian Dalzell, and his marriage contract was signed by Thomas McCalzean of Clifton Hall, Gavin Hamilton, Commendator of Kilwinning, and others. His son, also John Boswell, married secondly, Christian Stewart, a sister of James Stewart, Earl of Arran.

On 5 March 1591 John Boswell, younger, was accused by the Privy Council of practising witchcraft, sorcery, and enchantments, consulting with witches, and taking part in other devilish activities. Boswell's response to these allegations was to flee the country. The Privy Council heard that he had, "not only has oft and diverse times consulted with witches, but also by himself practised witchcraft, sourcery, enchantment, and other devilish practices, to the dishonour of God, slander of his word, and great contempt of his Highness, his authority and laws."

== Freemasonry ==
Boswell's signature and mark are found on the records of a meeting of the Lodge of Edinburgh held at Holyrood on 8 June 1600. According to many masonic historians, this is the earliest authentic record of a non-operative (or accepted) Mason attending a Masonic Lodge. There are others, however, who disagree. It is not clear in what capacity Boswell was in attendance at this meeting. It was not an ordinary masonic meeting of the lodge, but a trial of its Warden 'Jhone Broune'. While it is possible that he was there as a member (or an honorary member) of the lodge, it is also possible that he was there only as counsel for prosecution or defence (or for some other reason), and was not a member of the lodge at all. There is no evidence of his initiation in the lodge on that occasion or any other occasion, and the meeting of 8 June 1600 was the only occasion to which Boswell’s connection with the masonic Craft can be traced.
