= Peden's Cave (Auchinbay) =

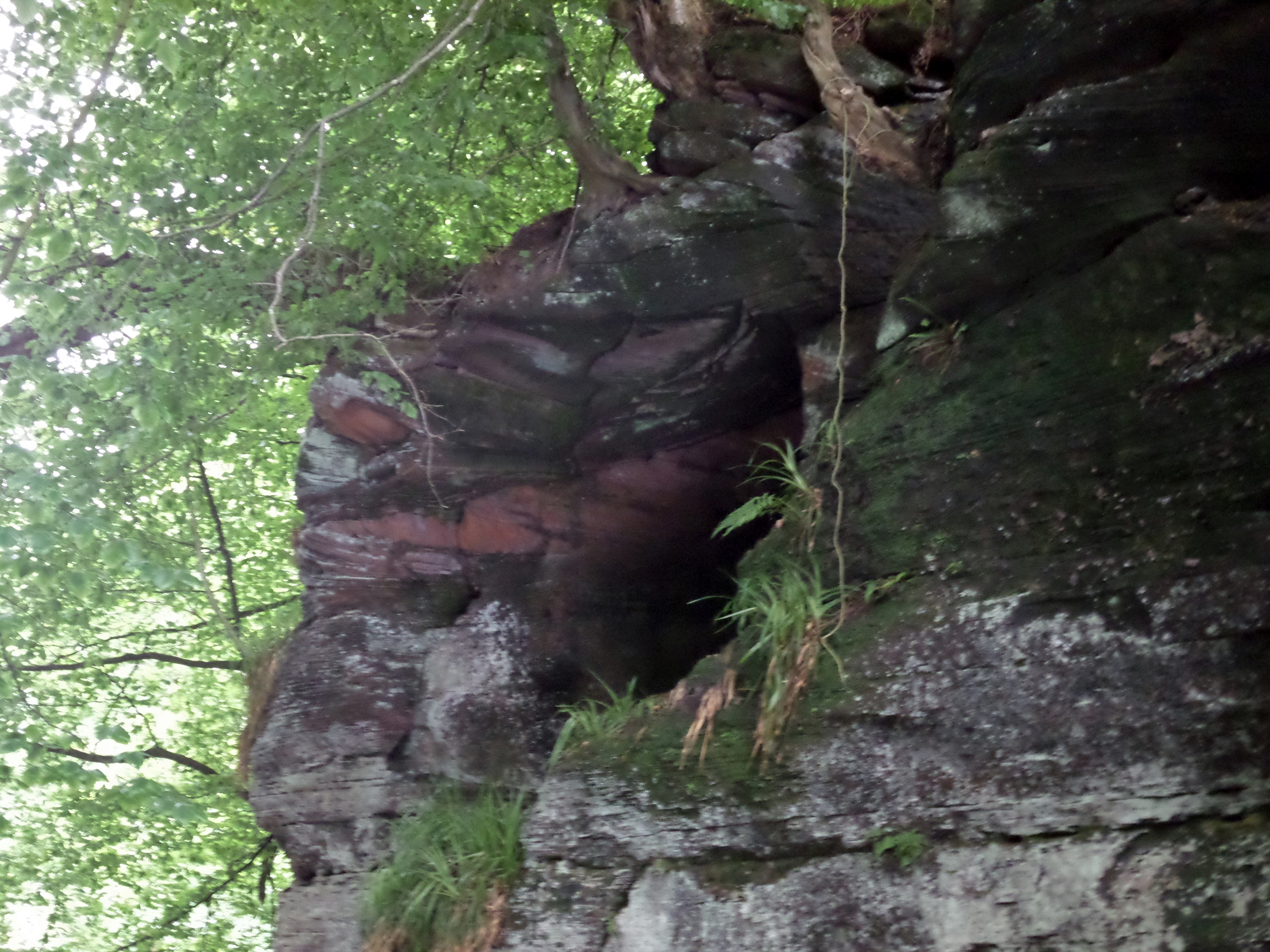
- The opening to Peden's Cave overlooking the River Lugar
- Interactive map of Peden's Cave (Auchinbay)
- Location: Ochiltree, East Ayrshire
- OS grid: NS 4880 2362
- Coordinates: 55°28′59″N 4°23′39″W
- Length: 8 feet (2.4 m)
- Elevation: 10 feet (3.0 m)
- Entrances: 1
- Difficulty: Caution required
- Hazards: Access
- Access: By carved steps

Peden's Cave is at least partly artificial and is set into a craggy outcrop of red sandstone rocks overlooking the River Lugar just below the farm of Auchinbay in East Ayrshire, Scotland, close to the town of Ochiltree. Traditionally it is said that this cave was used as a hiding place for Covenanters, including the famous Covenanter minister Alexander Peden in the 17th century, mainly during 'The Killing Time' of the 1680s.

== Cave and access ==
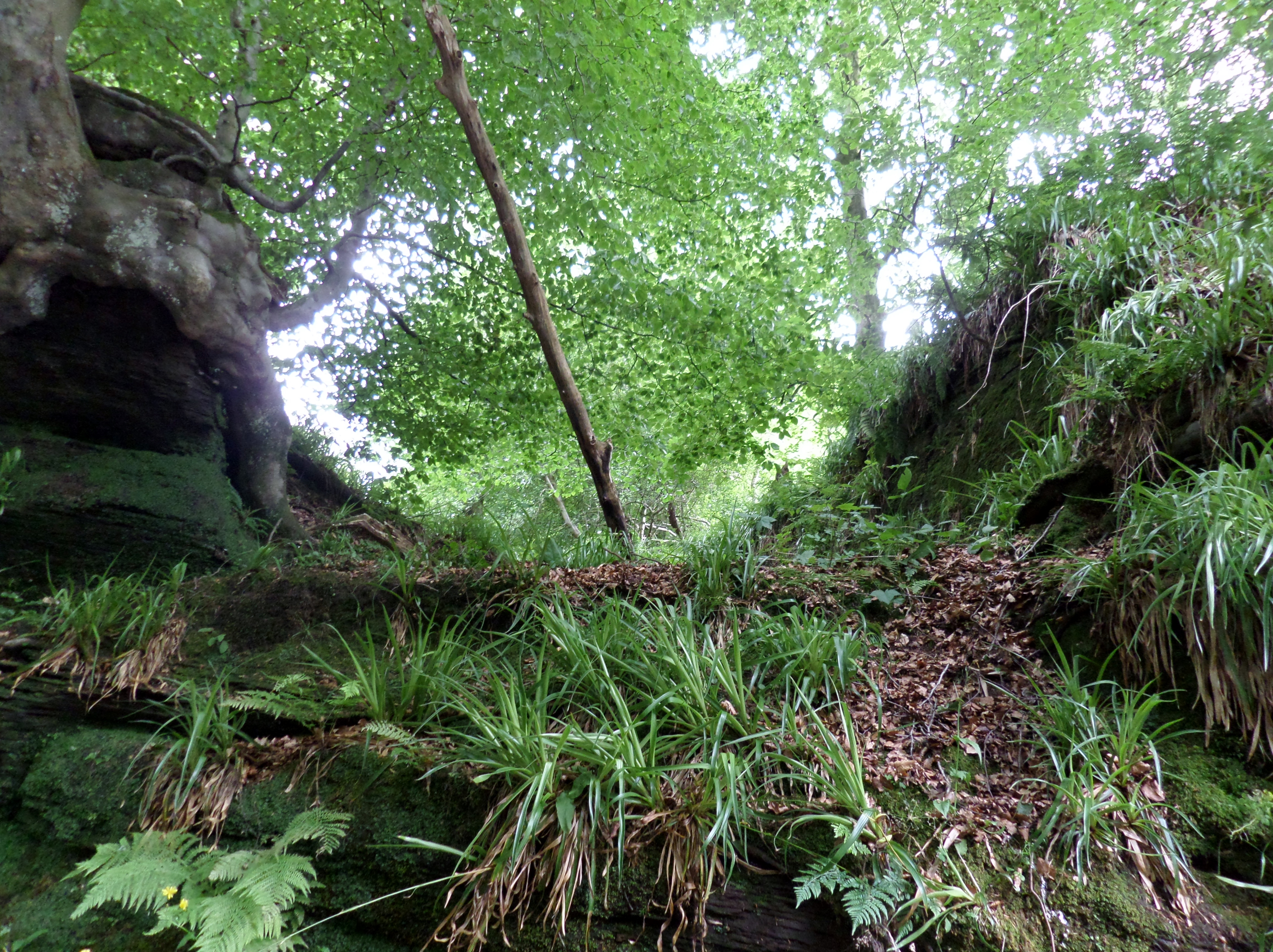
The stable or store next to the cave

Peden's Cave is located near the top of a much eroded red sandstone cliff, the cave floor being around 10 feet (3.0 m) above the River Lugar on the south-western side of this water course, just off the old road that ran from Stair past Auchinbay Farm and over the old Slatehole Ford, later replaced by the now ruined Slatehole Bridge and its associated lodge, running into the Auchinleck Estate. The cave is well camouflaged from directly above. The well known Wallace's Cave' is located at the junction of the River Lugar and the Dippol Burn, a short distance upstream.

The cave is not very large (6 feet (1.8 m) high, 4 feet (1.2 m) wide, and about 8 feet (2.4 m) long) and the chisel marks add emphasis to its artificial origin or creation from a smaller natural cavity. A bench or shelf has been cut inside and six steps have been cut into the rock face leading down to it, however access is still hazardous.

The opening is obvious from the opposite side of the Lugar Water however this is difficult to access and it is likely that, as at Dunton Cove, a bush such as gorse or willow would be cut and then pulled up and tied with ropes over the entrance as camouflage. Next to the cave is a sizeable rectangular area which it has been noted has features indicating that it may have been artificially shaped or quarried and even roofed over for use in stabling of horses, storage of food, etc.

== History ==
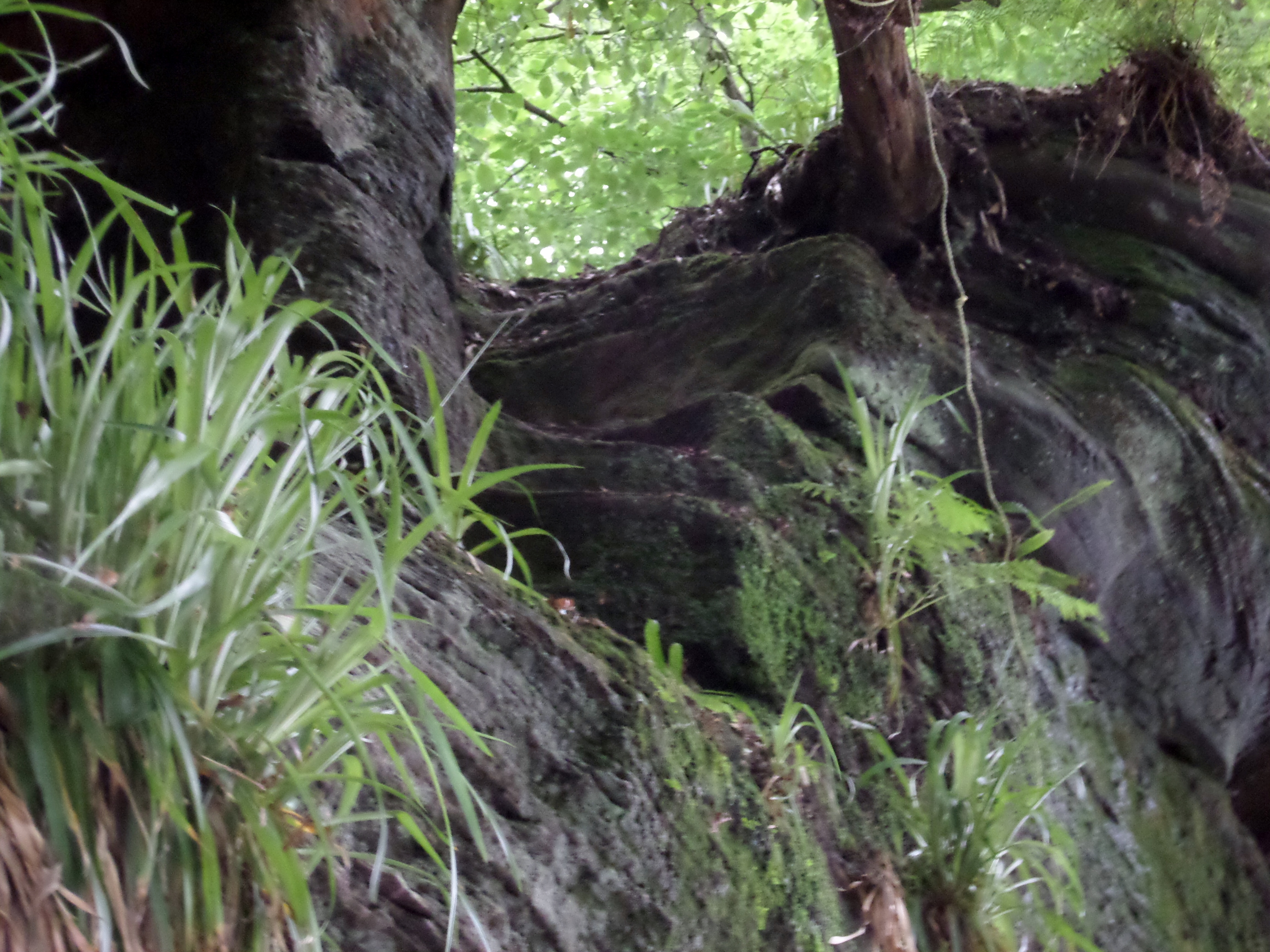
The steps down to the cave.

As a Covenanter minister preaching at various outdoor conventicles, Alexander Peden is said to have used a number of other caves as places of concealment during his years on the run from the King's soldiers, including Barskimming, one on Craigie Hill near the village, another at the Nick of the Balloch, a further example near the Water of Girvan and his final cave hiding place may have been the Cleuch Glen in Sorn Parish which he reportedly asked to be made when he sensed that his illness was terminal, supposedly hiding beneath some straw when it was searched by soldiers.

The facts remain unclear, however one telling of the history is that a brother of the Covenanter minister lived at Tenshilling Farm, the surviving Ten Shilling Bridge lies close to the estate's so called Deer Cave. Alexander's brother is said to have brought food to the cave to feed him and the various other Covenanters who hid with Peden from time to time.

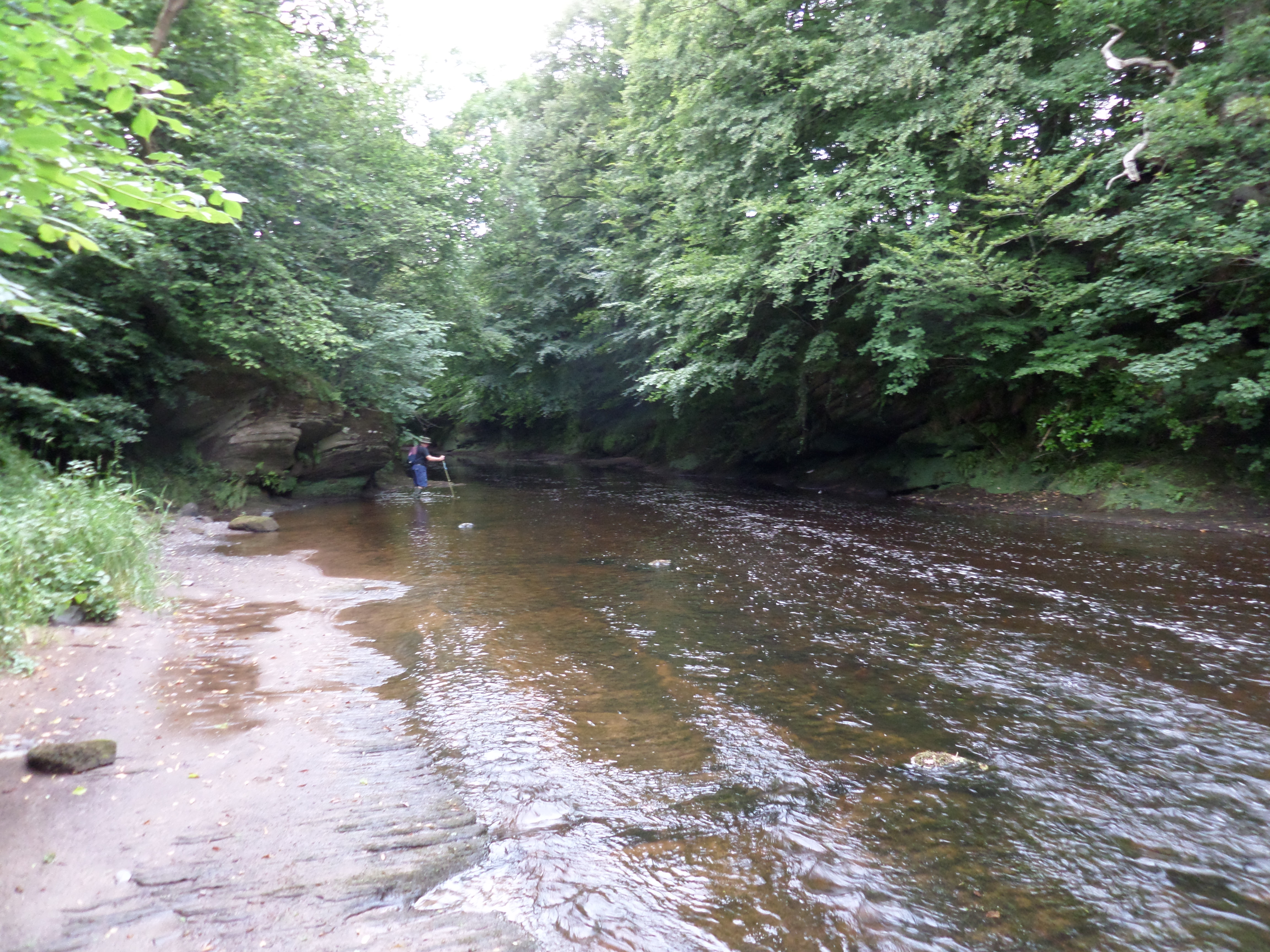
The old Slatehole Ford.

It may have been this cave where he took ill before moving closer to his brother's farm where he died on 26 January 1686. He was secretly buried at Auchinleck in the churchyard however he was later exhumed by the King's soldiers and later buried at the foot of the gallows tree in Cumnock where a graveyard is now located with memorials to Alexander Peden and several over Covenanters. The soldiers had intended to hang the minister's corpse from the tree however William, second Earl of Dumfries prevented this.

Several other caves in Ayrshire and beyond are said to have been used as places of concealment by Covenanters in general, such as the Cleeves Cove on the Dusk Water near Dalry and Dunton Cove on the Craufurdland Water near Waterside in East Ayrshire.

The cave's location is close to one of the few local fording places over the River Lugar that existed before any bridges were constructed, making it a surprising location for a hiding place and in addition Dumfries House, Auchinleck House and Ochiltree House were all in the immediate vicinity.

The cave may have seen various uses after the time of the Covenanters such as shelter for travellers or a base for people assisting travellers who were crossing the river by the ford, especially when the water was high or when it was in spate, certainly local anglers have found it to be a convenient shelter.

Many other sites have Peden's name attached to them such as the Peden's Pulpit near Failford, another at Dalry and a Peden's Stone as well as Peden's Hut, etc.

== Micro-history ==
The mound that is all that remains of Ochiltree Castle lies upstream opposite Auchinleck Castle and the impressive red sandstone boulder known on the old maps as Kemp's Castle is located between Ochiltree Castle and Peden's Cave. A 'Kemp' in Scots is a hero or a champion of great strength and is a name applied to many hill forts, mottes, etc. throughout Scotland.

== See also ==
- Cleeves Cove
- Dunton Cove
- Hallhill Covenanter Martyrs Memorial
