= Auchinleck Castle, East Ayrshire =

Castle in East Ayrshire, Scotland

Auchinleck Castle
- East Ayrshire, Scotland
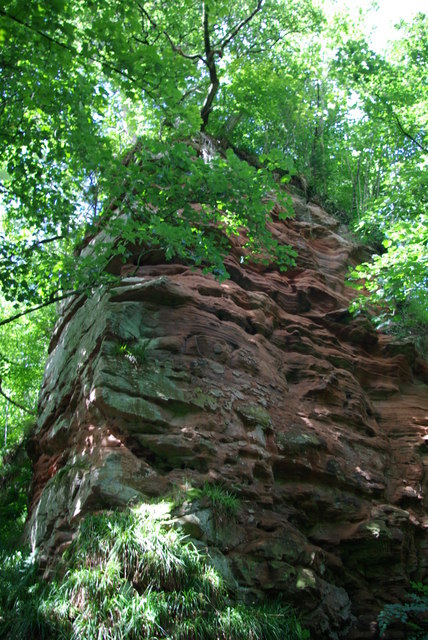
- Fragmentary remains of Auchinleck Castle

Site information
- Condition: Ruined

Location
- Coordinates: 55.4795°N 4.3758°W

Site history
- Built: 13th Century

Scheduled monument
- Official name: Auchinleck Castle
- Type: Secular: castle
- Designated: 19 March 1992
- Reference no.: SM5269

Auchinleck Castle was a castle built on a rocky promontory on the eastern bank of the Lugar Water, East Ayrshire, Scotland across the river from Ochiltree Castle. It was built by the Auchinleck family in the 13th century.

The remains of the castle are designated a scheduled monument.

== See also ==
- Wallace's Cave, Auchinleck - lies just downstream from the castle.
