= Dunton Cove =

- The Covenanters' Cave
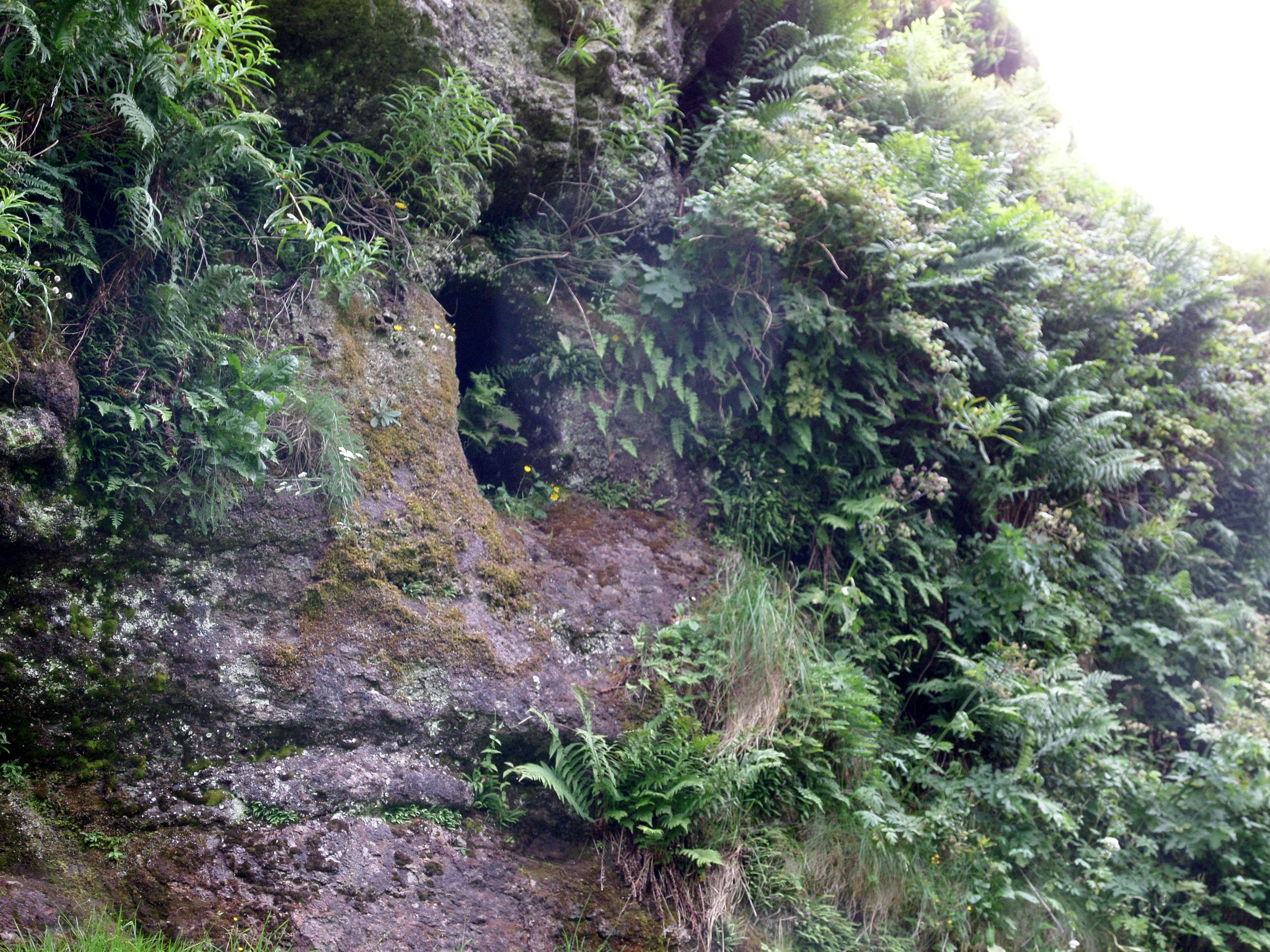
- The entrance into Dunton Cove Covenanters Cave.
- Interactive map of Dunton Cove
- Location: Waterside, East Ayrshire
- OS grid: NS 509 448
- Coordinates: 55°40′27″N 4°22′20″W
- Length: 10 feet (3.0 m)
- Elevation: 20 feet (6.1 m)
- Entrances: 1
- Difficulty: Challenging
- Hazards: Access
- Access: By hand and foot holds

Dunton Cove or the Covenanters' Cave is an artificial cave in a craggy outcrop of rocks overlooking the Craufurdland Water just below the confluence of the Dunton Water and the Calf Fauld Water in East Ayrshire, Scotland, close to the village of Waterside. Traditionally it was used as a hiding place for Covenanters in the 17th century during 'The Killing Time' of the 1680s.

== Cave and access ==
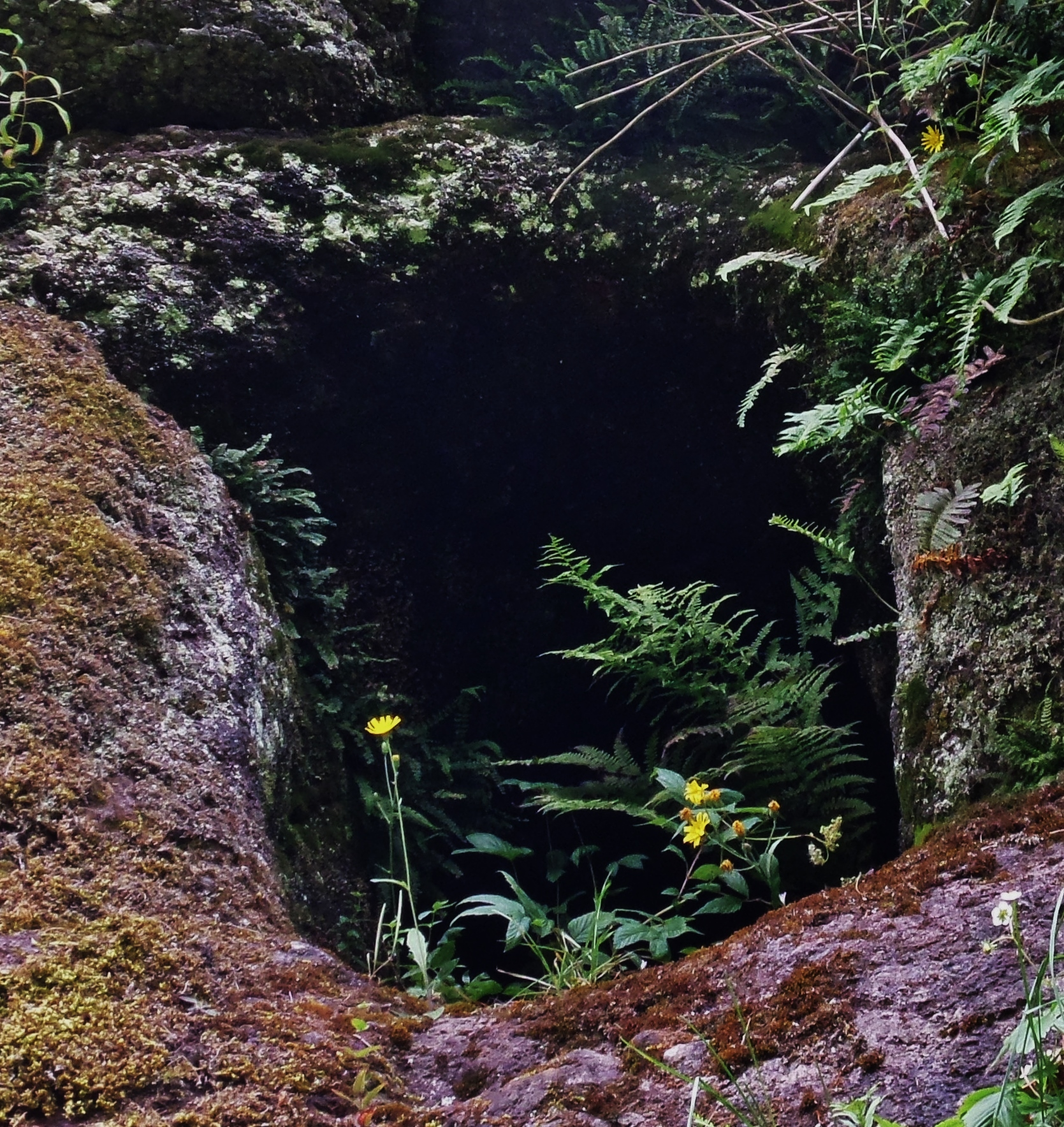
Rectangular entrance to the cave.

The Dunton Cove is located in a stone cliff above the Craufurdland Water on the east side of the water course, just off the private road leading from Airtnoch Farm through the forestry plantations to Craigendunton and the old reservoir.

The cave is only large enough for a few people and the regular lines of the rectangular opening add emphasis to its artificial origin or creation from a pre-existing cavity. Several hand and foot holds have been cut into the rock face however access is difficult. Internally the cave has no special features such as a shelf for sitting and its therefore seems to have been used as a short term refuge used whilst soldiers were temporarily in the vicinity.

The opening is obvious from the level of the Craufurdland Water and it is said that a bush such as gorse or willow would be pulled up and tied with ropes over the entrance as camouflage.

== History ==
The word cove in Scots means 'cave'.

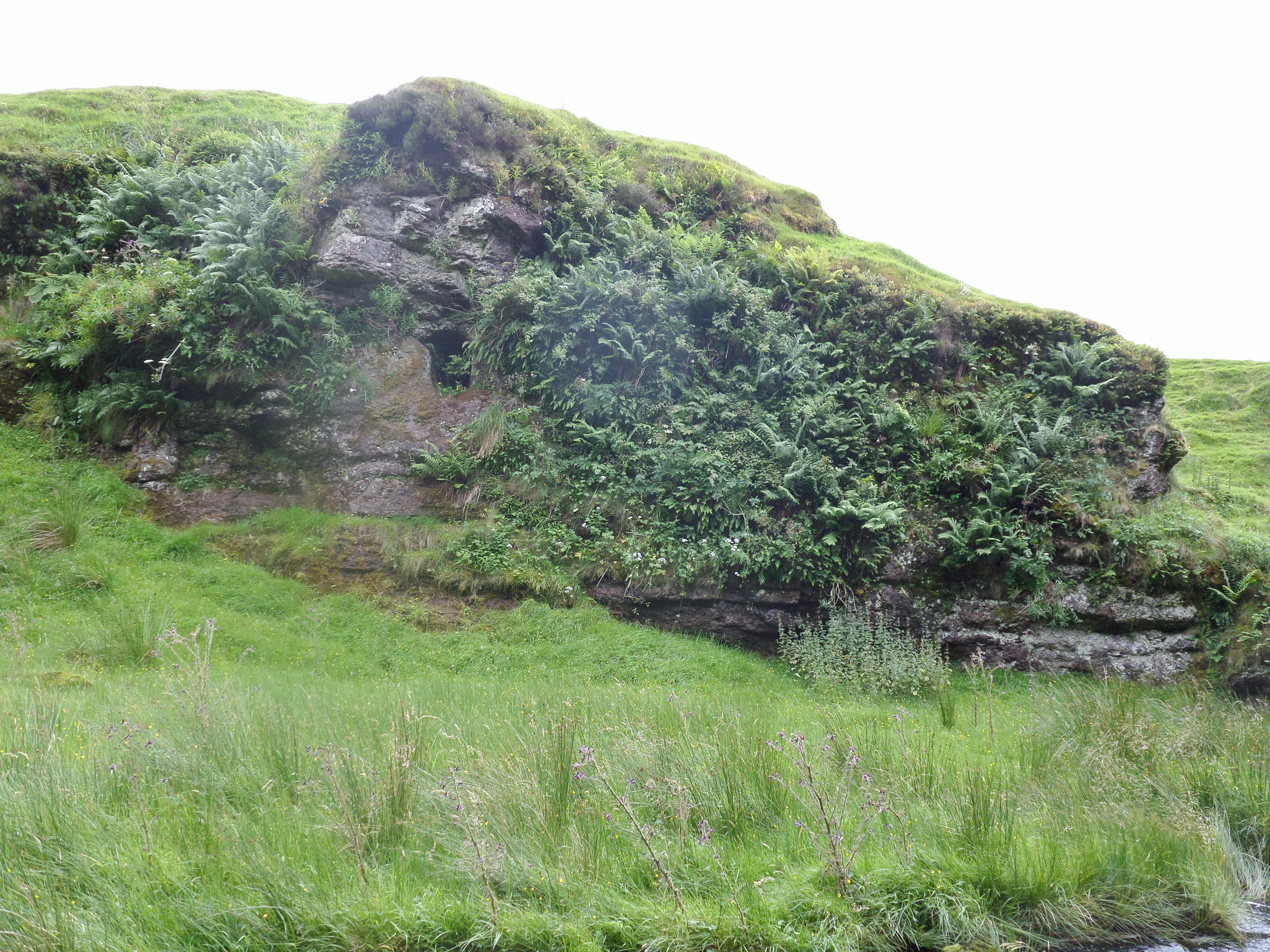
The cave within the cliff face.

It is noted in the 1856 Ordnance Survey 'Name Book', Volume 27 as being recorded on "Mr. Craufords' Estate" map and local information of its use by Covenanters and its artificial origin was provided by Matthew Dunlop of Craigendunton and John Dunlop of Waterside.

No specific record of the cave's use are recorded however Covenanter sympathies were strong in the area and the 'Fugitive Roll' of May 1684 records "Andrew Gemmil, in Bembreich (Benbeoch); James Lindsay and his son Thomas in Glerfin (Clanfin), and his son, Thomas Lindsay; James Howie and his son, John Howie at Lochgoin Farm and also living at Lochgoin was Isobel Howie, who is known to have gone into hiding after a raid on Lochgoin. Meadowhead and Airtnoch farms were rented by the Covenanter, John Paton."

A story is recorded by one author of soldiers pursuing a group of Covenanters across the moors and upon reaching the Craufurdland Water they became aware that their prey had entered this cave and rather than soak their uniforms crossing the water course they instead fired a number of rounds into the opening and left satisfied that the men had been killed however having laid themselves on the floor they were in fact unscathed.

Several other caves in Ayrshire and beyond are said to have been used as places of concealment by Covenanters, such as the Cleeves Cove on the Dusk Water near Dalry and Peden's Cave on the Lugar Water near Ochiltree.

== See also ==
- Cleeves Cove
- Peden's Cave (Auchinbay)
- Hallhill Covenanter Martyrs Memorial
