= Cleeves Cove =

Geological feature in Scotland

- Blair Cove
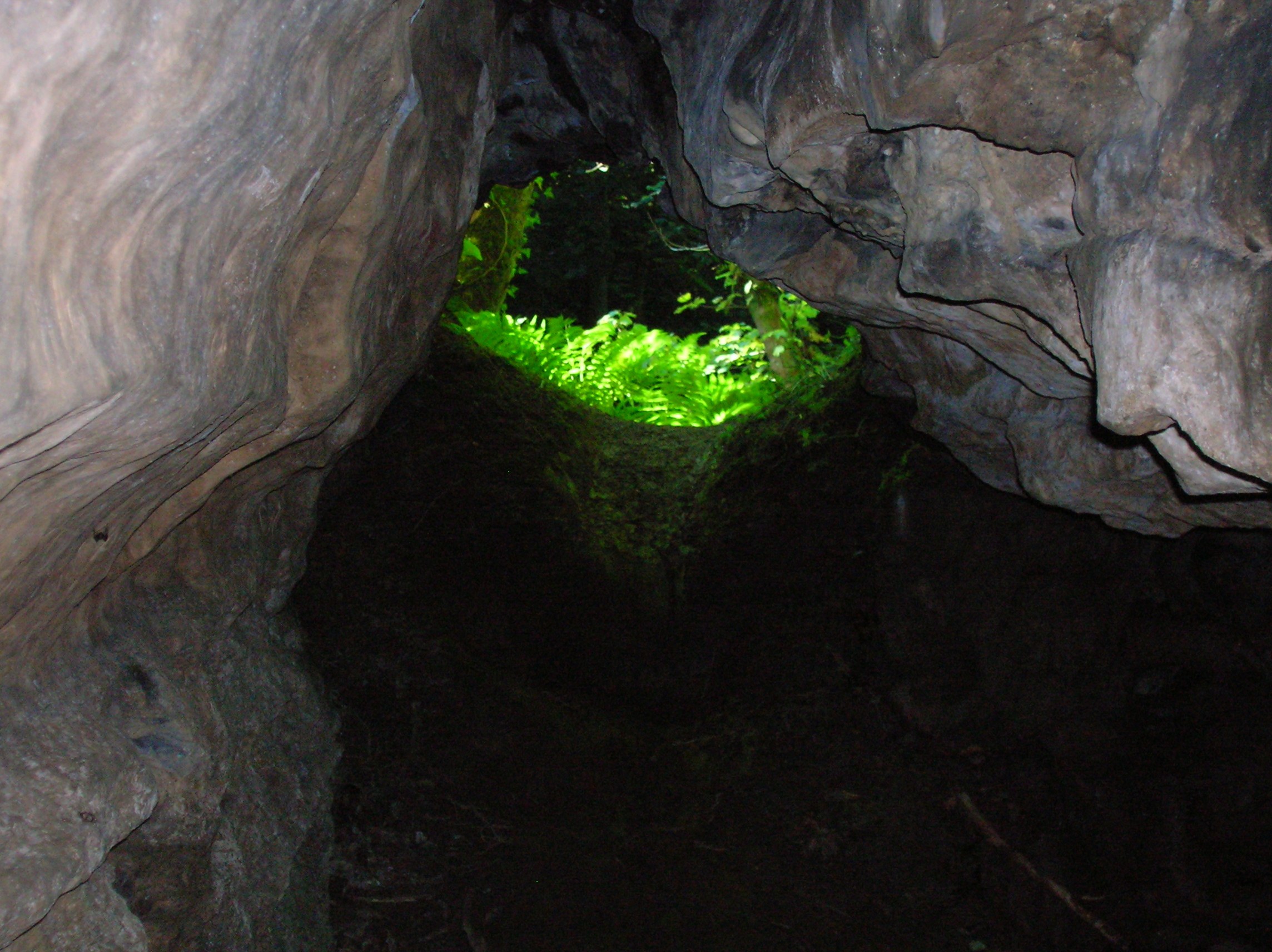
- An entrance into Cleeves Cove
- Interactive map of Cleeves Cove
- Location: Dalry, North Ayrshire, Scotland
- OS grid: NS 3717 4745
- Coordinates: 55°41′29″N 4°40′46″W
- Length: 500 feet (150 m)
- Elevation: 190 feet (58 m)
- Entrances: 3
- Difficulty: Easy
- Hazards: Access path
- Access: Hazardous

Cleeves Cove or Blair Cove is a solutional cave system on the Dusk Water in North Ayrshire, Scotland, close to the town of Dalry.

== Cave system ==
The Cleeves, or Cleaves Cove (Scots) cave system is situated in the lower beds of Carboniferous limestone. It has a total passage length of around 500 feet (150 m). The caves are now well above the level of the Dusk Water and lie close to Cleeves Farm and Blair Mill on the Blair Estate. Many of the stalactites and stalagmites have been damaged by visitors. The cave has three practical entrances facing onto the Dusk Water.

A number of older books refer to the romantic sylvan dell of Auchenskeigh, now Auchenskeith, derived from Achadh-na-sgitheach - the field of thorns. The calcareous incrustations in these caves were compared with Gothic fretwork. A number of old limestone quarries lie close to the modern day farm of Auchenskeith, but it is likely that Auchenskeigh is a synonym for Cleeves Cove.

== History ==
The word cove in Scots means 'cave'. John Smith published a monograph entitled Cleaves Cove Stalactites and Stalagmites, published by Elliot Stock in which he provided drawings and a detailed description of these structures within the cave system, many of which have been destroyed. The site was previously known as the 'Elfhouse' or 'Elfhame' the locals at that time believed that these magical creatures had made this their abode. Ness calls the site Glen O'Dusk or the Elf-hame, the caves being the Elf-house.

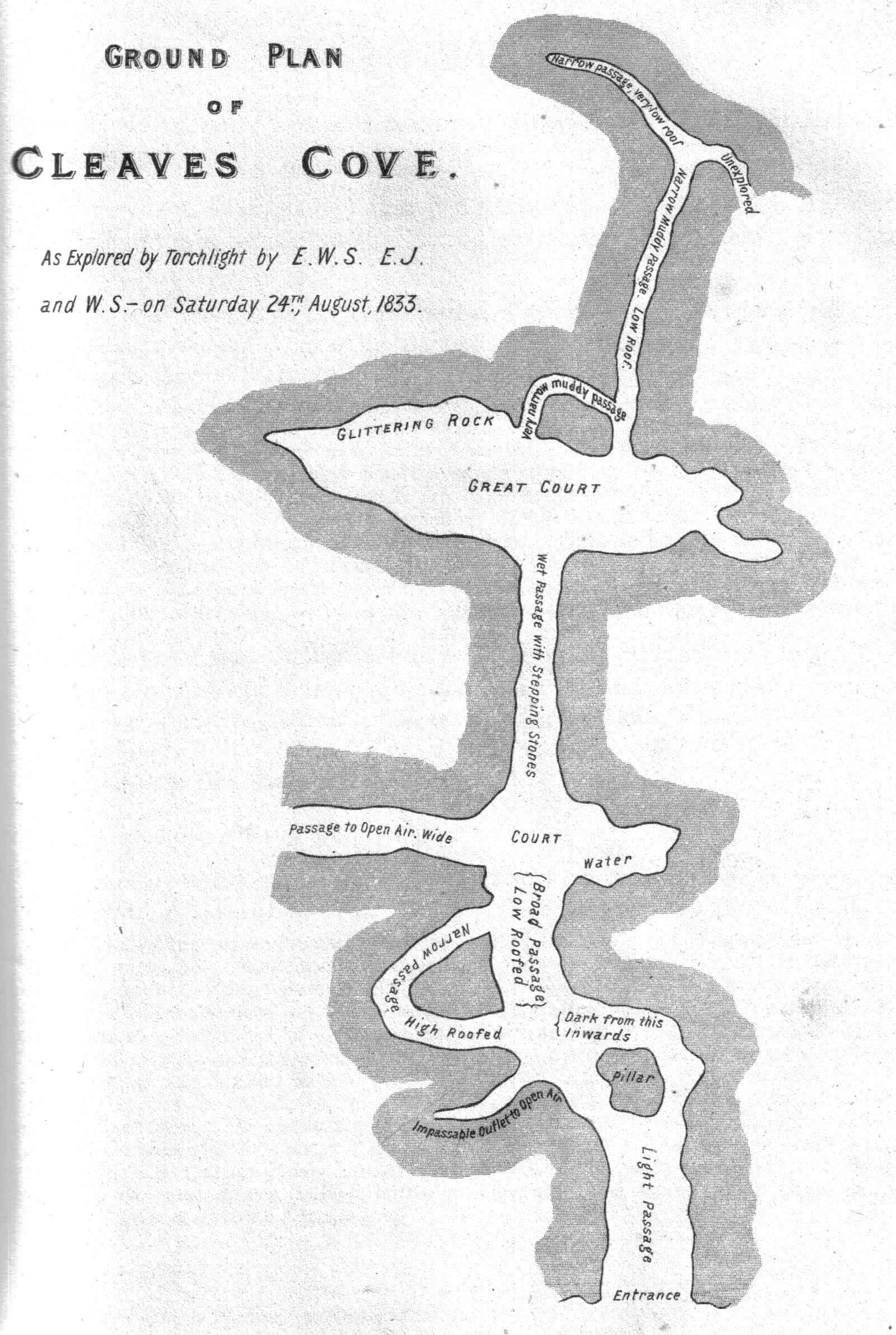
The 1833 plan of the cave system before it was excavated by John Smith

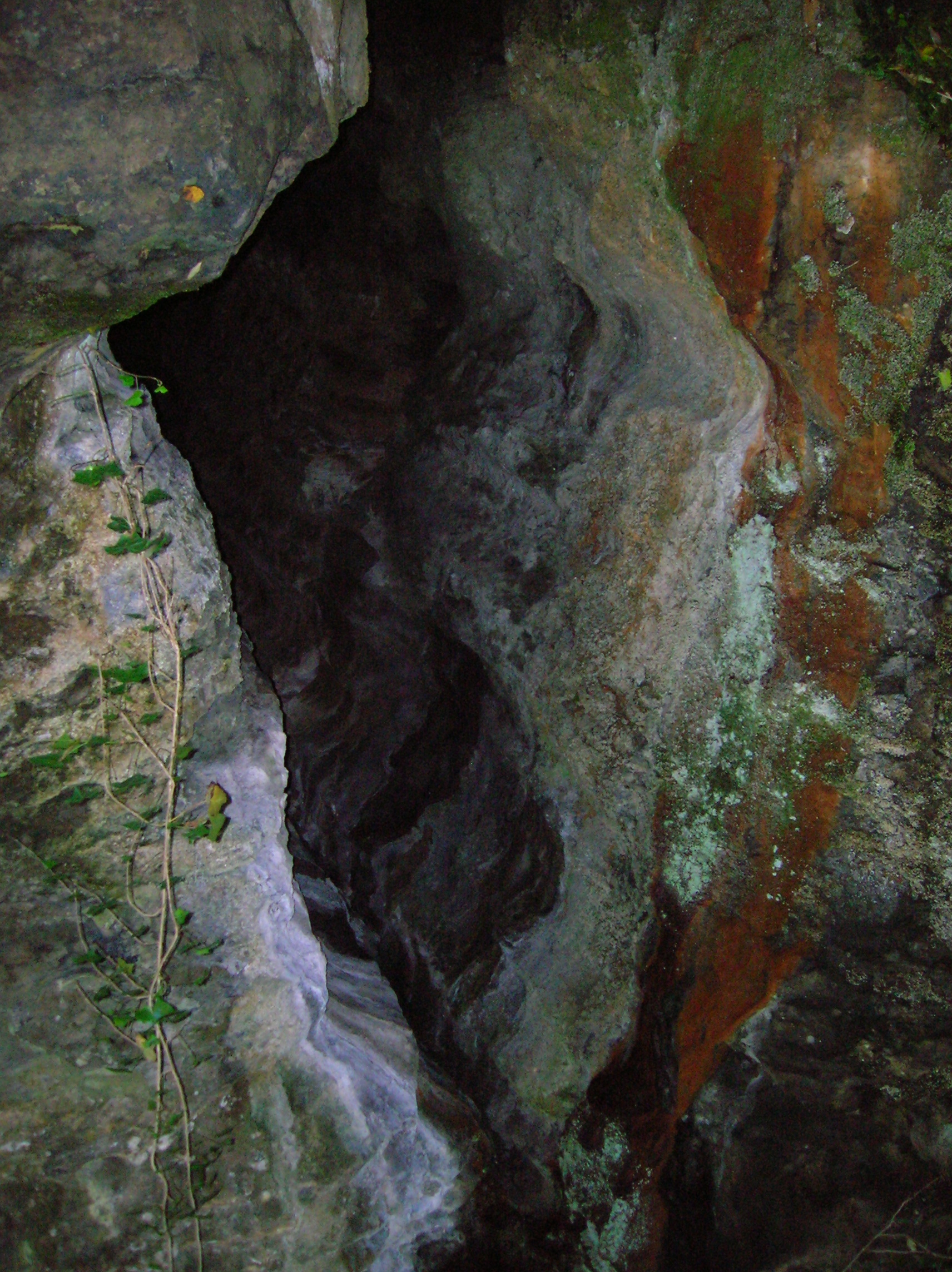
One of the cave system entrances

The cave system was formed in Dusk Glen when the waters of the Dusk (Dubh-Uisge, Gaelic for 'black water') ran through and eroded the limestone, followed by a period when it was relatively dry allowing the stalactites and stalagmites to form and finally a progressive infilling with soil washed in from above, resulting in a partial infilling of the caves and passageways; at this point John Smith obtained permission from Captain Blair, R.N., of Blair House to explore and ultimately remove some 300 tons of material. The cave now lies 40 feet (12 m) above the Dusk Water due to the excavation of the gorge by the river. Near the middle is a spacious chamber, 35 feet (11 m) long by 27 feet (8.2 m) broad and 12 feet (3.7 m) high. The internal surfaces of the chambers and passageways are covered with calcareous incrustations and numerous crevices branch off in all directions. It was regarded in Victorian times as one of the greatest natural curiosities in Ayrshire.

An emerald, bronze finger-ring and two iron spears from John Smith's excavations

The fictional Dr Duguid refers to "Smith's Room" in the caves, although he did not know if Smith was a hermit, smuggler or covenanter. The name is a coincidence as the recollections are before John Smith's time.

=== Excavations ===
Smith started in January 1883, working at night, with six volunteers, removing and sifting through 300 tons of deposits over a period of six months. He organised a trip on the Clyde as a reward to his helpers. He recorded his work in several journals and books, producing a map and giving names to some of the features and entrances.

During his excavations John Smith unearthed a number of man-made objects such as a flint knife, spindle-whorl, bone spoon, bronze finger-rings, a stag's horn handle, spear heads, parts of a bridle, an iron battle-axe and a cut-glass emerald. Various bones were found, including those of beaver, sheep, hare, rabbit, cat, rat, dog, weasel, pheasant, partridge, duck, goat, ox, pig and goose. The seeds of fourteen species of plants were found, but none were from edible cereals.

=== Human and animal occupants ===
Charcoal deposits were found, suggesting that fires had been lit within. The evidence suggests that the caves were used at some point by humans for either temporary shelter, refuge at times of crisis or both. Dobie records that the cave system was used as a refuge for the local Covenanters during the times of their persecution by the government of Charles II (1630–85) and Paterson confirms this, indicating that the Statistical Account of Ayrshire, written by the local ministers, was his source. Cummell records that the Covenanters held Conventicles in the glen.

The cave system has been the haunt of foxes, bats, cave spiders, moths, and other animals.

=== Elfhame ===
Robin Cummell records that the caves were the "Elfhame o'the Blair", and that at Halloween they would come riding out of the caves on horses that were the size of mice, their long yellow hair straming or tied in knots with crimps of gold. Their quaichs were acorn cups and they drank wine beneath the toadstools. Their clothes were green velvet and their arrows were made of moss-reed tipped with flint arrow heads that were dipped in hemlock poison. The bows were made from the rib bones of unbaptised babies who had been secretly buried in the shaws and glens.

=== Cholera pit ===
The burial at Cleeves Cove is located within a low stone wall close to the Dusk water, and is said to be that of a member of the family who lived at Cleeves Farm. Tradition has it that "A prediction was uttered many long ages ago, that Cleaves (sic), on three successive occasions, would be the first place in the parish visited by the pestilence. The cholera of 1832 was called the fulfillment of the second visitation: accordingly, many of the older inhabitants talk of one still being in reserve." It is said locally that a group of trees mark one of the cholera pits.

== Views of the cave complex ==
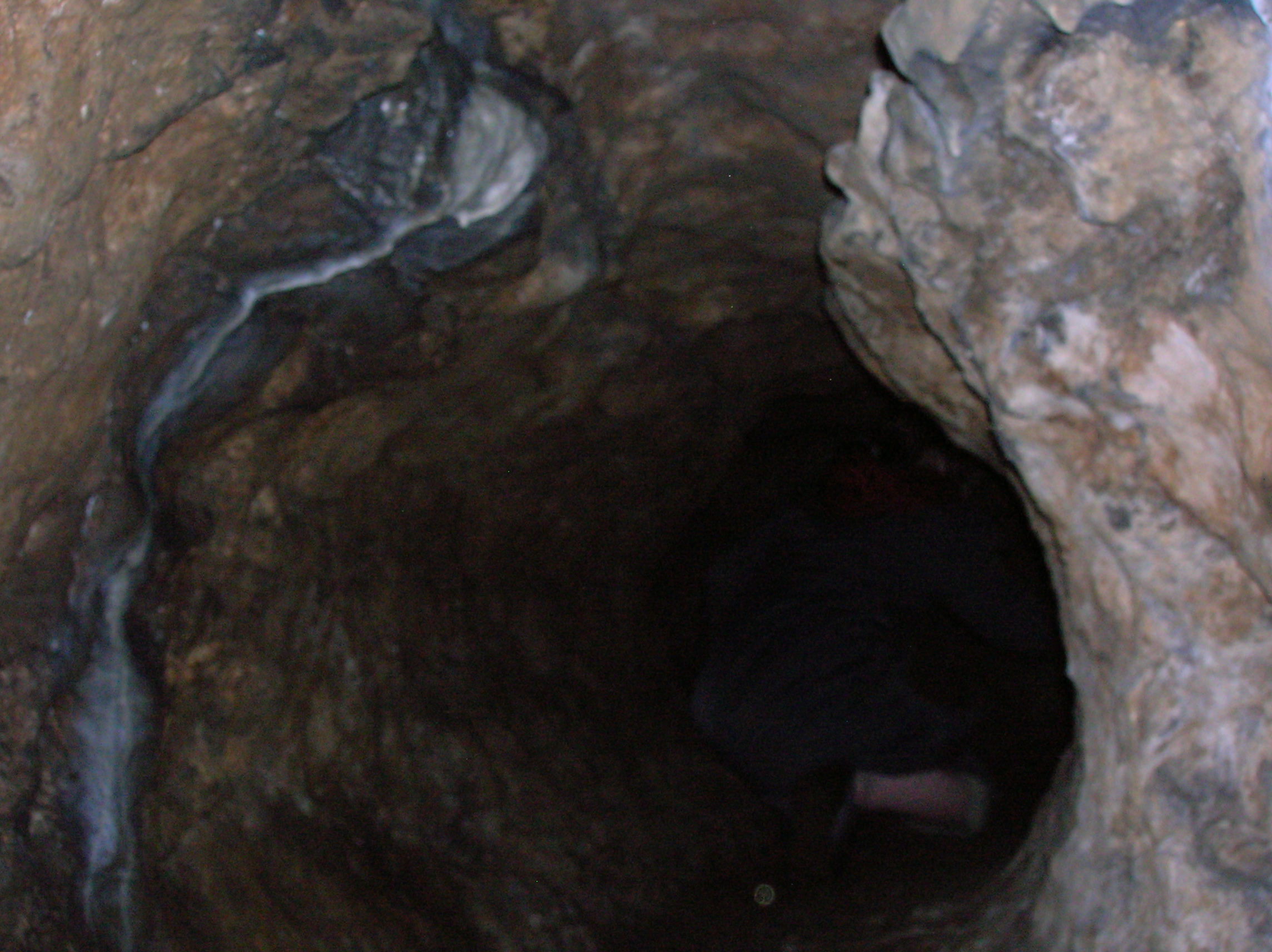
A passageway within the cave system

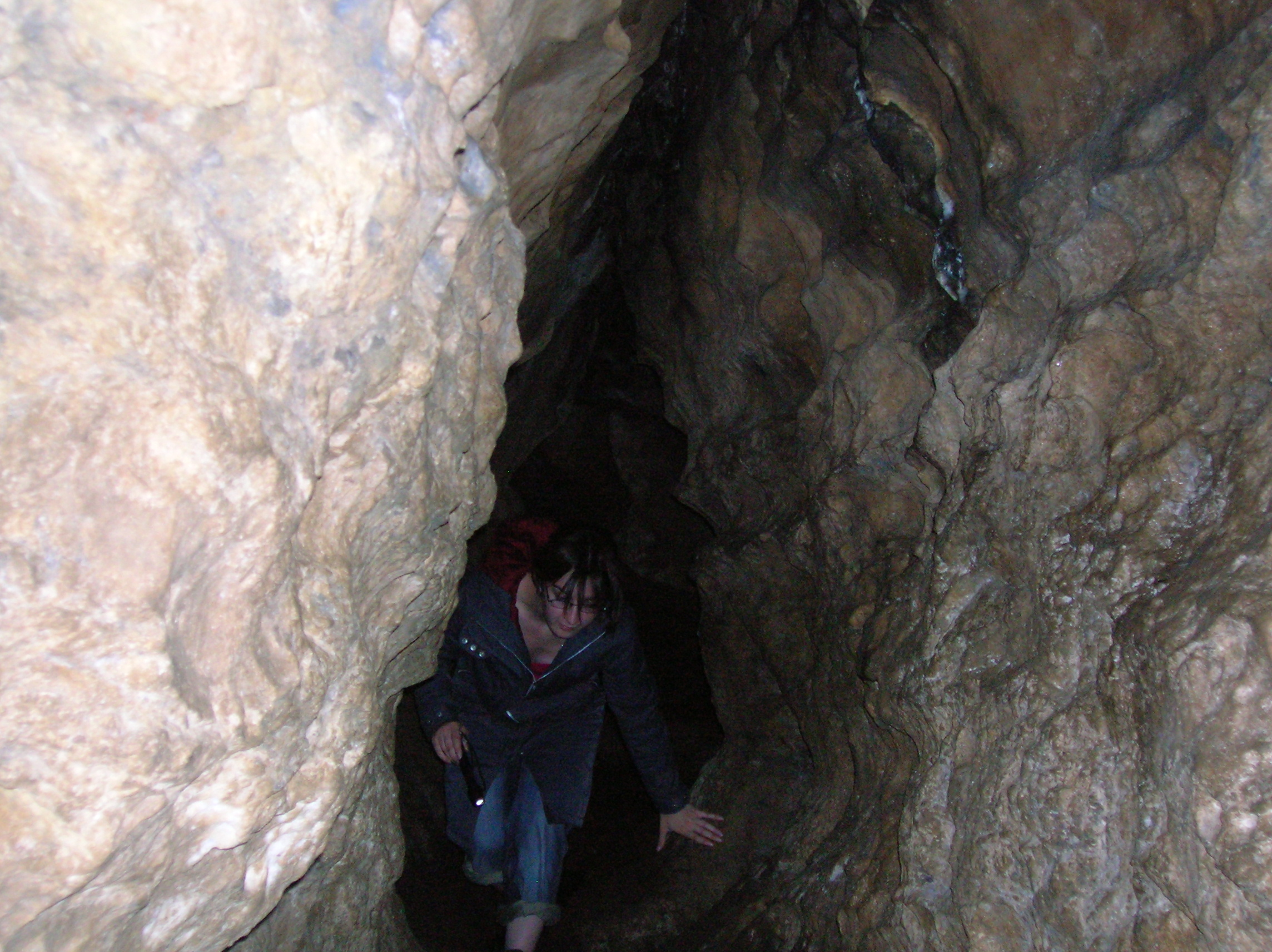
A passageway showing erosion features

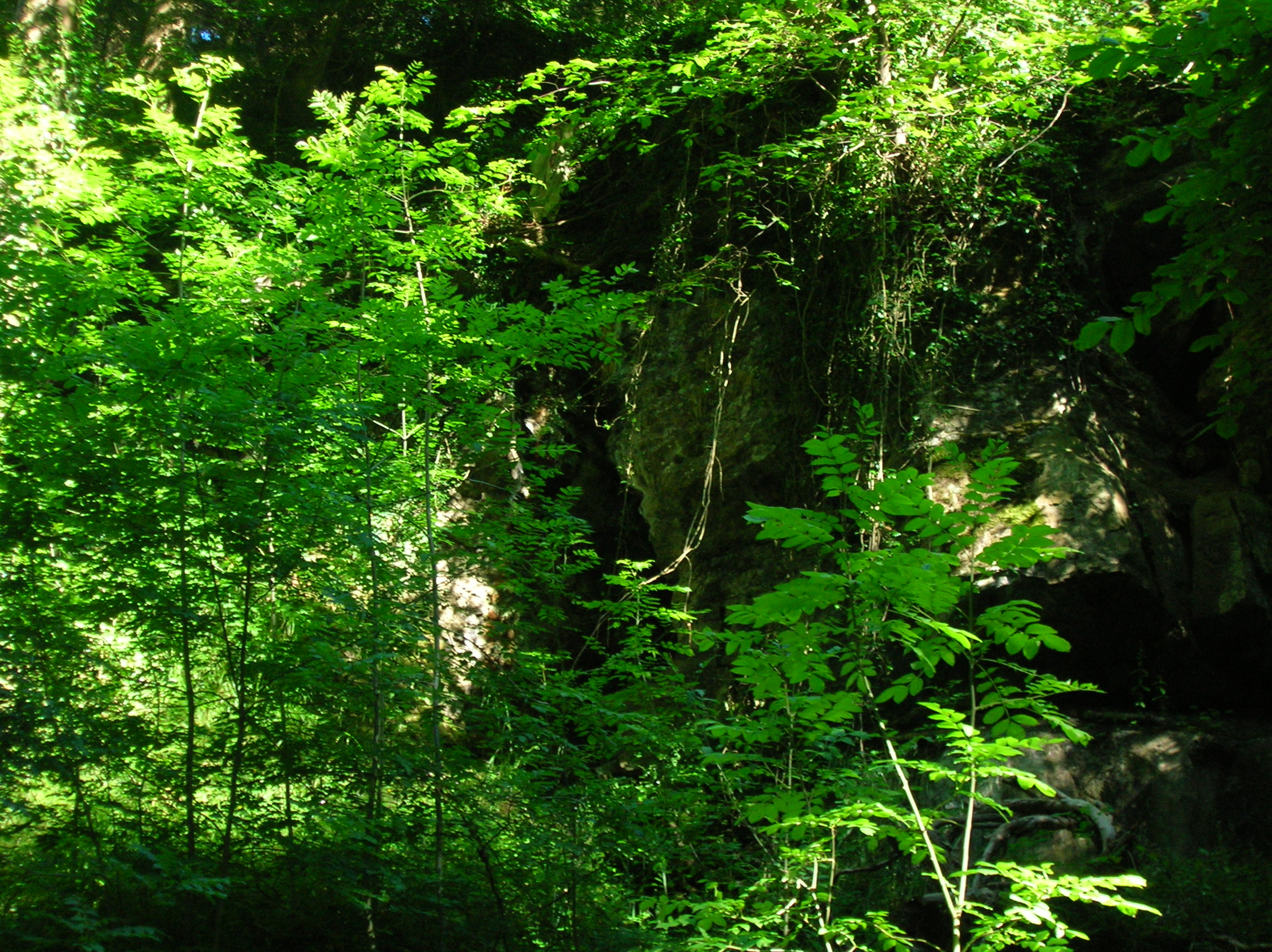
One of the entrances to the cave system as seen from the Dusk Water

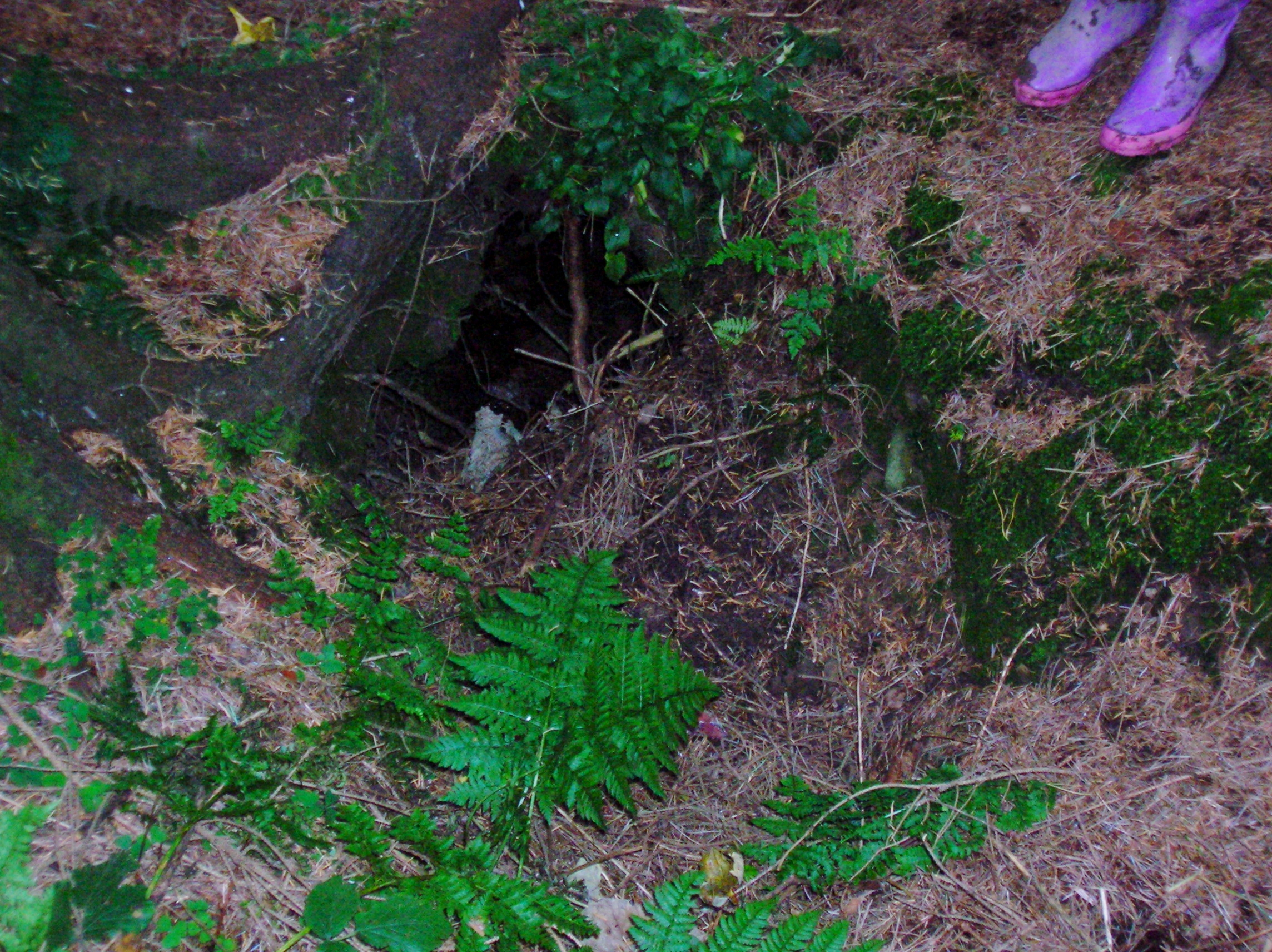
An area of subsidence corresponding to soil entering the cave system.

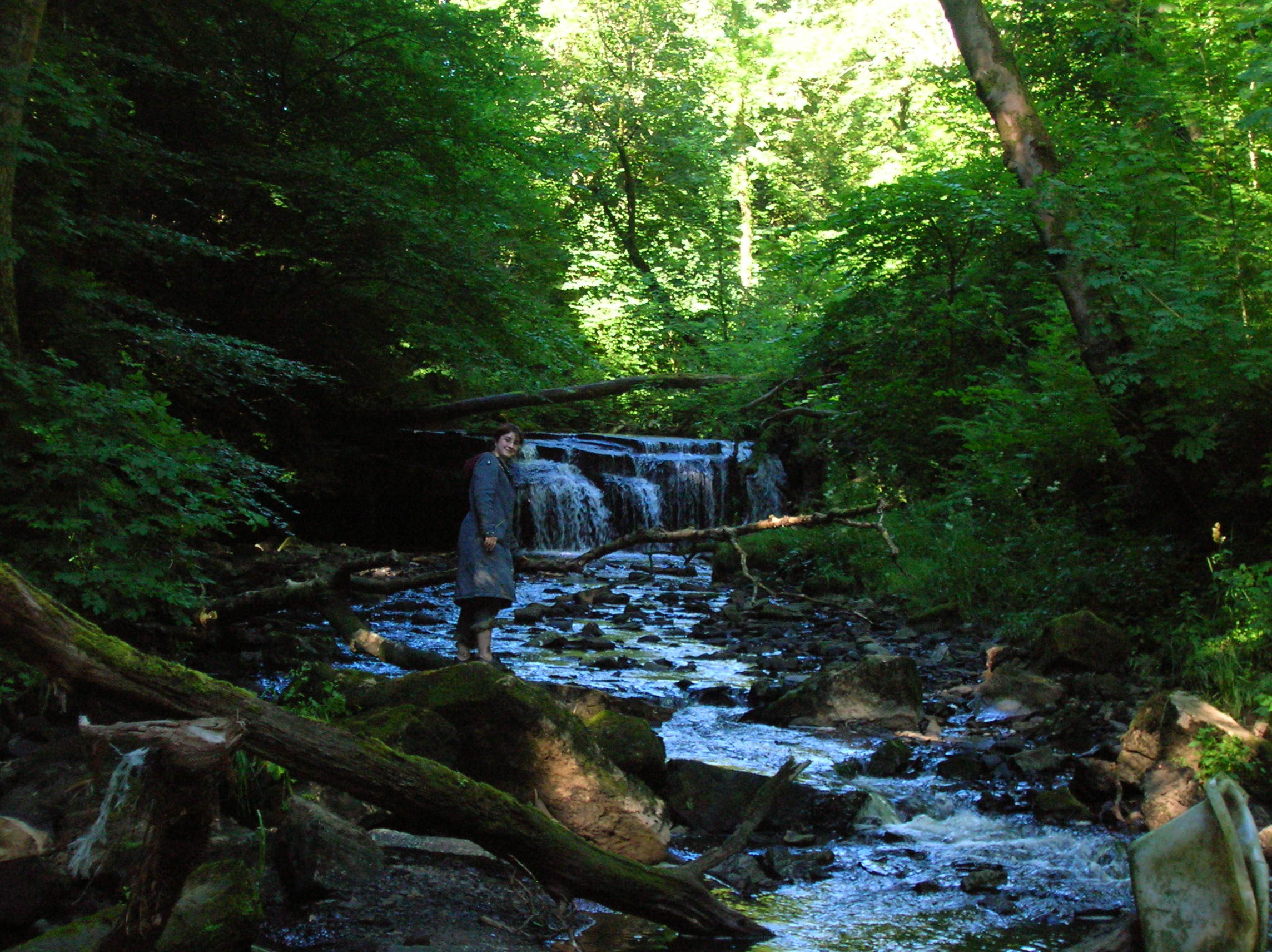
The Dusk Water below Cleeves Cove caves

== Auchenskeith Quarry ==
A mineral line ran to this old limestone quarry and its associated limekilns in the mid 19th century.

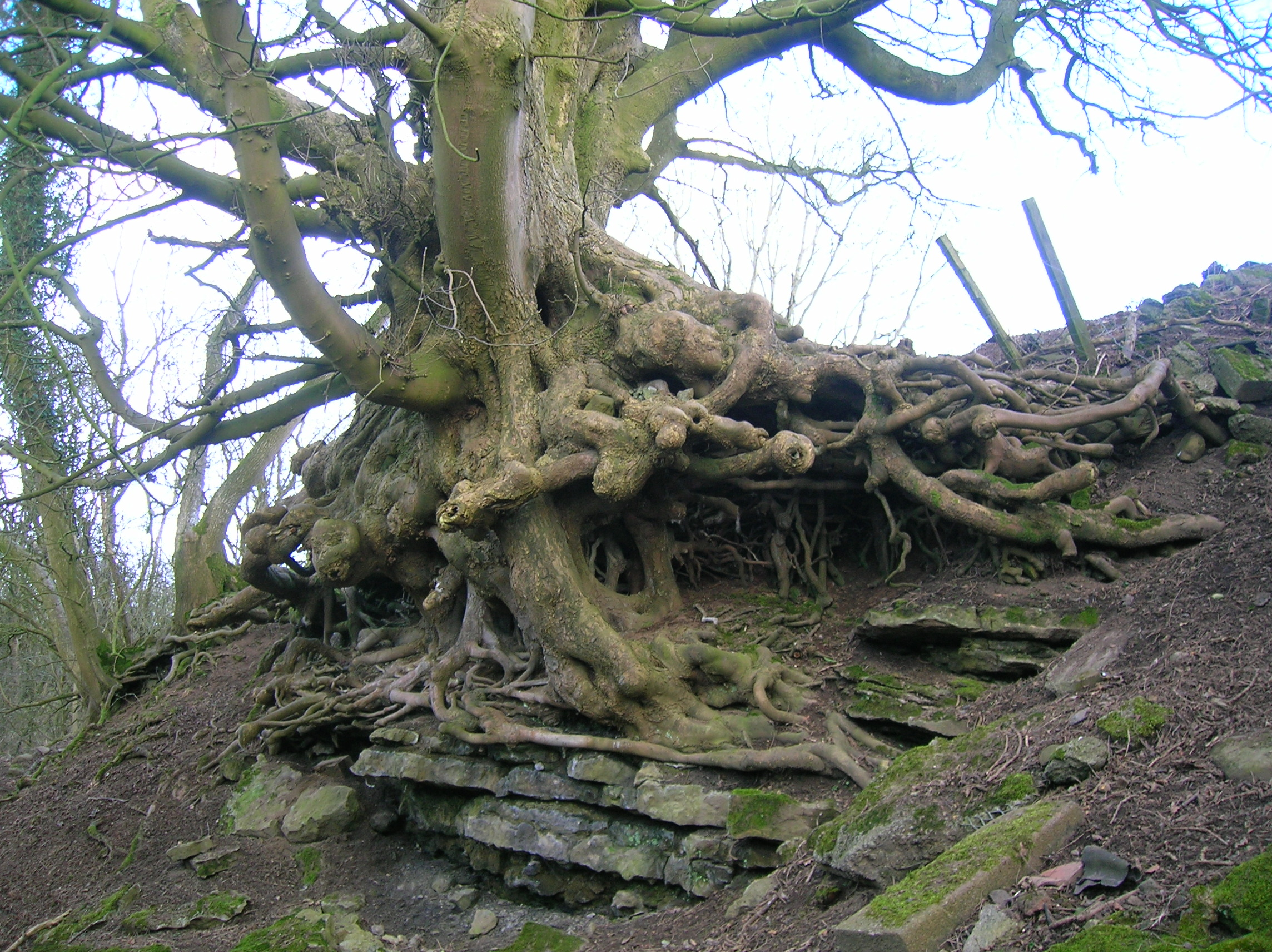
Sycamore root system at Auchenskeith.

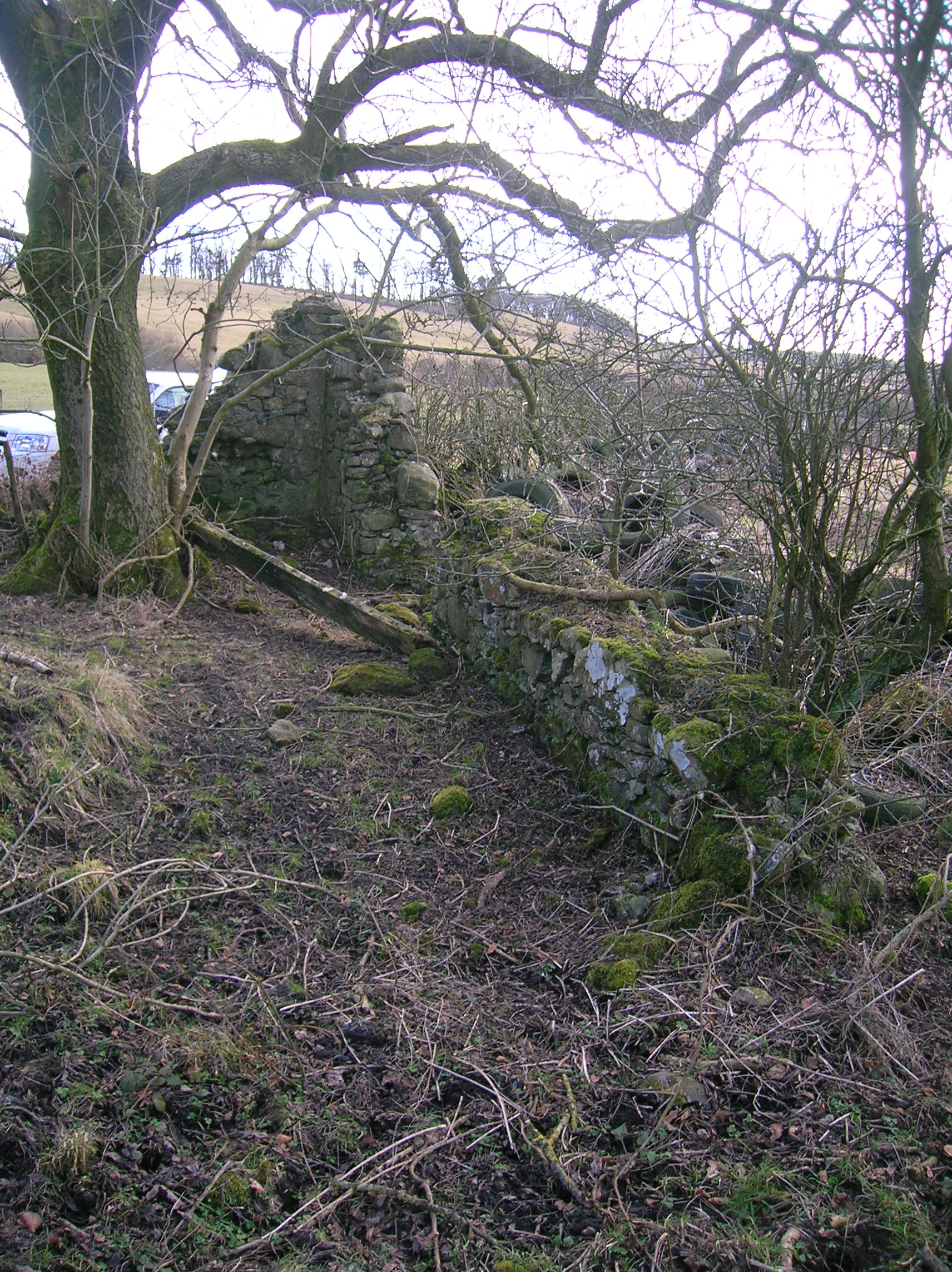
Old quarry buildings.

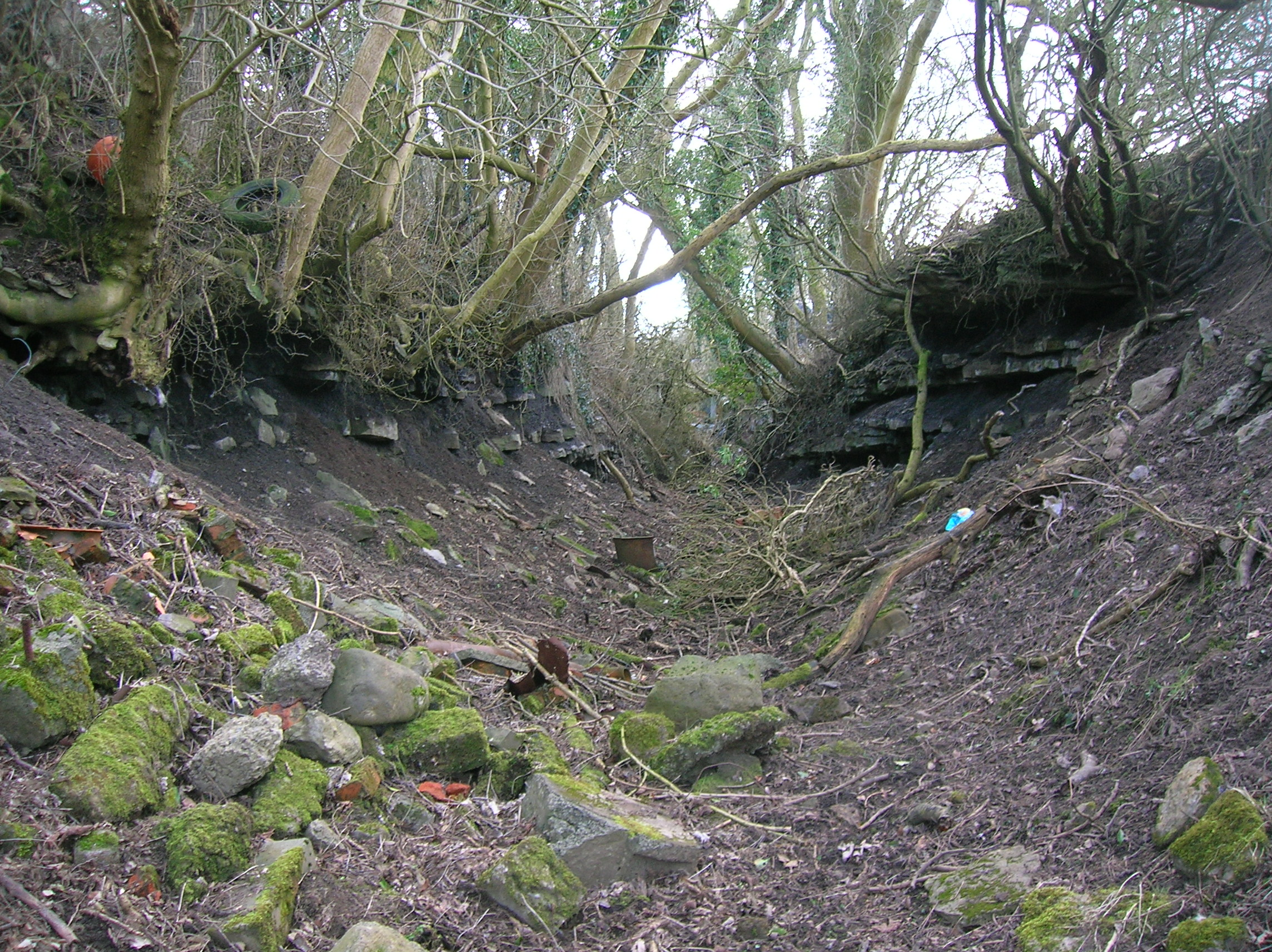
Old railway cutting.

== Covenanters Caves ==
Several other caves are found in Ayrshire and elsewhere in Scotland that are associated with the Covenanters and the 'Killing Times' of the 17th century, these include Dunton Cove near Airtnoch Farm and Peden's Cave on the River Lugar near Ochiltree.
