= GAV =

Gav or GAV may refer to:

== Economics ==
- Gross annual value, a municipal value of the actual rent or fair rental value
- Gross asset value, a value of consolidated properties a company owns

== Film ==
- Gāv, a 1969 Iranian film
- Govindudu Andarivadele, a 2014 Telugu Indian film

== Organisations ==
- General Assembly of Victoria, of the Presbyterian Church of Australia
- Grup d'Acció Valencianista, a Spanish political group

== People ==
- Gavin, a male given name
- Gav-Paradhi, an Indian tribe

== Places ==
- Gav, Iran, north-western Iran
- Gav, Sistan and Baluchestan, south-eastern Iran
- Granville railway station, Australia
- Gymnazium Andreja Vrabla, a school in Slovakia
