= Charles Farrar Forster =

Curate of the parish of Lockwood (1848-1894)

- Vicar of Beckwithshaw
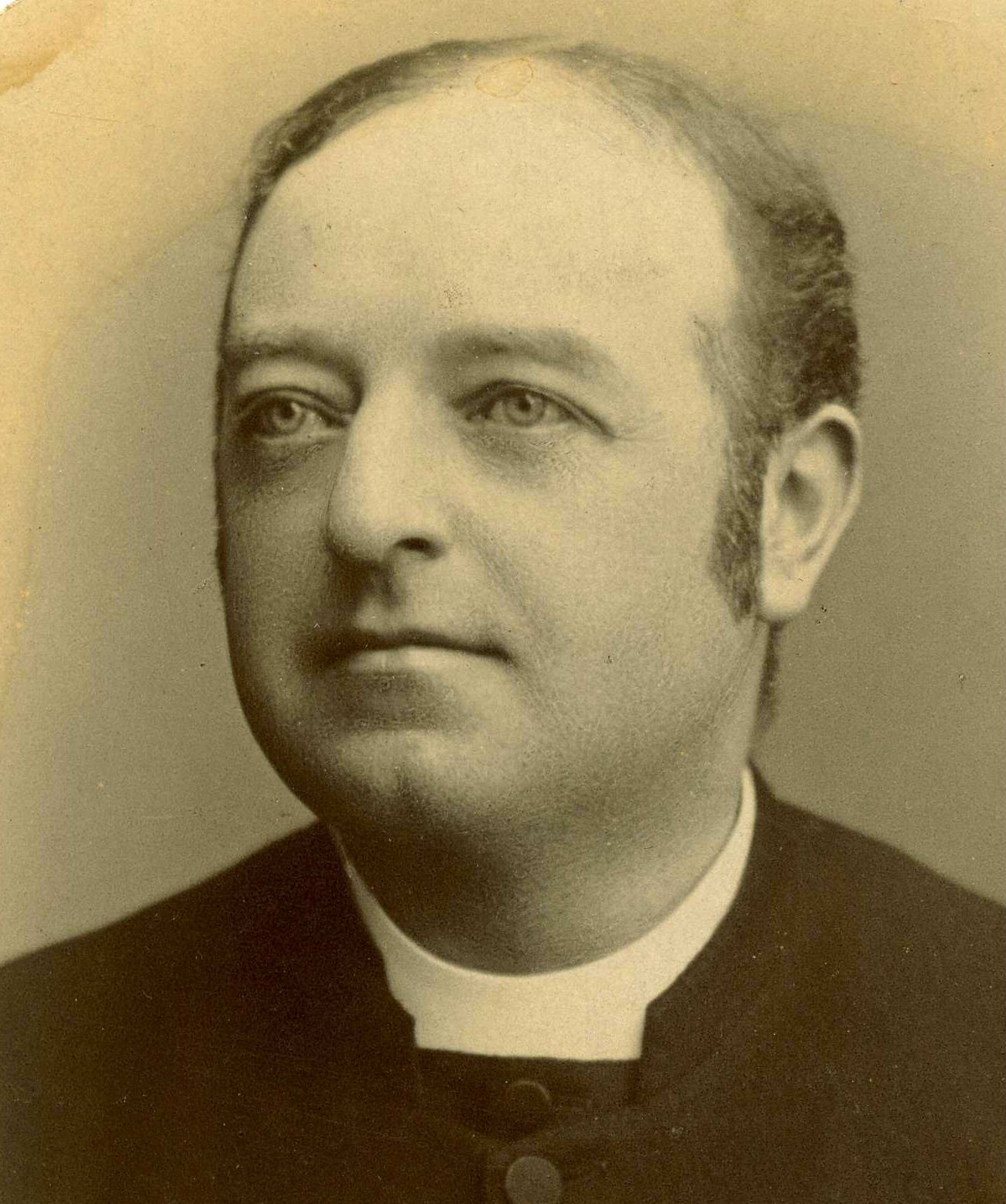
- In office: 1887–1894
- Other posts: Curate at Lockwood (1873–1878); Curate at St Mary's, Deane (1878–1880); Curate/vicar at St Andrew's, Huddersfield (1878–1887)

Personal details
- Born: 29 February 1848 Knaresborough, Yorkshire, United Kingdom
- Died: 28 August 1894 (aged 46) Bournemouth, Hampshire, UK
- Buried: Harlow Hill Cemetery, Otley Road, Harrogate; 53°58′50″N 1°33′54″W
- Denomination: Church of England
- Education: St Bees Theological College

Charles Farrar Forster FRGS FSSc (29 February 1848 – 28 August 1894) was curate of the parish of Lockwood near Huddersfield, vicar of St Andrew's Church in Huddersfield, and the first vicar of the Church of St Michael and All Angels, Beckwithshaw.

In spite of suffering severe pain due to heart disease during his working years, he was known for his dedication to parochial work and for the large congregations who came to hear his sermons. For all his bodily fragility he was notable for his personal charisma, causing various newspapers to remark upon the numerous friends among his past and recent parishioners and among his fellow clergymen who formed part of his life and who attended his funeral and memorial services.

== Life ==
=== Ancestors ===
Charles' paternal grandfather Daniel Forster, an inspector of weights, was born in Otley, West Yorkshire in 1776, and died in 1844. He was buried on 30 December 1844 in the same town. His wife Bella, a school mistress and Charles' grandmother, was baptised in Otley in 1796, and died aged 78 in 1866 in Otley.

Their seventh child was Henry Highmore Forster, Charles' father, who was born on 14 October 1821 in Otley and baptised on 11 August 1823 at All Saints Church, Otley. In 1841 at the age of 15, Henry was a grocer, as was his older brother. Henry died in Burmantofts aged 48 on 14 March 1869. Charles' mother was Martha Ann Farrar, who was born in 1825 in Halifax, West Yorkshire and died in Guisborough in North Yorkshire in 1897 aged 72. Henry and Martha married in 1846 in Halifax and had six children, of which Charles was the eldest. One of Charles' brothers was Edward Eustace Forster (1849–1916), chairman and managing director of printers Knight & Forster Ltd., of Leeds.

=== Charles and his wife ===
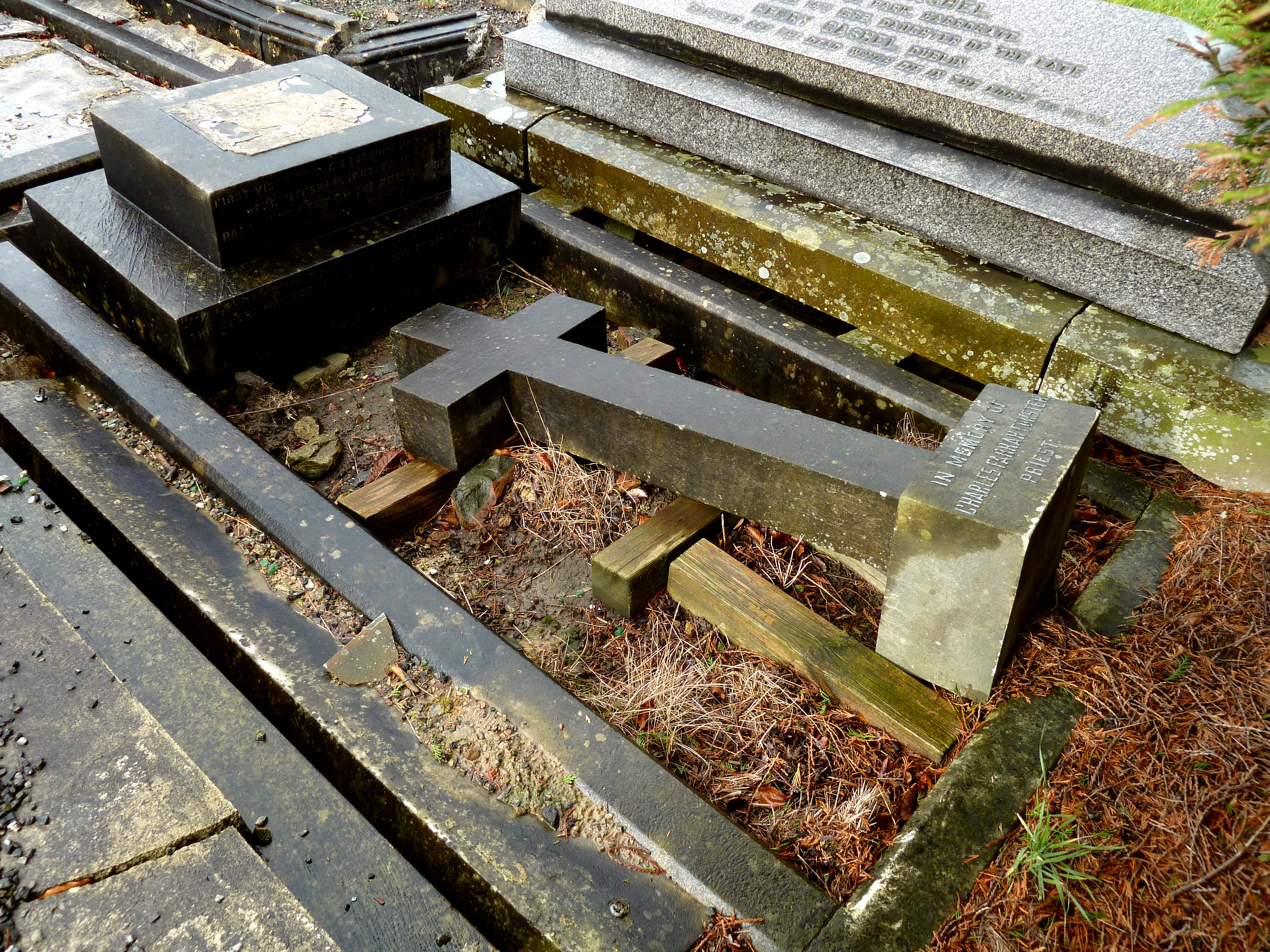
Grave of Forster at Harlow Hill Cemetery, 2014

Charles Farrar Forster was born on 29 February 1848 in Knaresborough. On 6 October 1880, in Lockwood parish church, he married Mary Priestley, who was born in 1858 in Lockwood and was the eldest daughter of James Priestley, JP. In honour of this marriage, 438 workers at B. Vickerman & Son, a woollen mill in Huddersfield, were given a day out by special train from Berry Brow to Southport.

The 1891 Census shows them living at Pannal vicarage with one servant: Ellen Tupper, aged 46, from Wiltshire. He is aged 43, Mary is 33, and he is described as a clerk in holy orders.

Farrar had a weak heart. In July 1894, just before evening service at Beckwithshaw he had a "bad attack" in the church, and the service was postponed. With some difficulty his parishioners carried him to the vicarage and called for medical aid. He was too ill to work, and was taken to Bournemouth for a rest and the sea air in the hope of improving his health.

He died in Bournemouth on the morning of Wednesday 28 August 1894, leaving his wife a widow with no children. His funeral at 3pm at Beckwithshaw Church on 1 September 1894 was brief: he was buried just half an hour later at 3.30pm at Harlow Hill Cemetery, Harrogate.

At Armitage Bridge, West Yorkshire on 30 September 1902 at the age of 44, Mary Forster née Priestley took a second husband, a widower who had been married twice before: Sir Thomas Brooke, baronet (31 May 1830 – 16 July 1908), of Armitage Bridge House, near Huddersfield, a Deputy Lieutenant and Justice of the Peace. Mary died on 12 March 1938, aged 80.

== Work ==
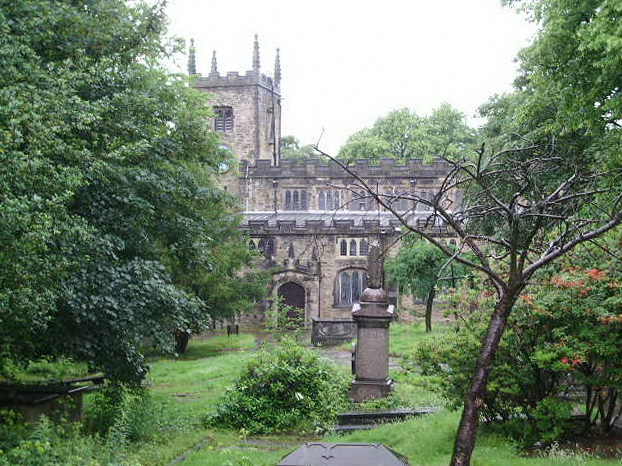
St. Mary the Virgin, Deane

Forster studied at St Bees Theological College. In 1873 or 1875 he was ordained deacon at Ripon. From 1873 or 1875 to 1878 he served as curate of Lockwood parish near Huddersfield. In 1877 he was ordained priest. When T.B. Bensted died in 1878 he resigned his first curacy at Lockwood, and from 1878 to 1880 served as curate or vicar at St. Mary the Virgin, Deane, Bolton le Moors in Lancashire.

=== St Andrew's, Huddersfield ===
From 1878 to 1880 he was curate-in-charge at St Andrew's parish in Huddersfield, a "typical working class district", then on Monday 28 June 1880 was licensed to sole charge of the parish by the Bishop of Ripon and appointed to the living by five trustees. He was vicar until 1887. The living had a gross annual value of £260, but by the time his resignation was announced, it had fallen to £257. He became well known there and had many friends. In spite of having an acute form of heart disease, his parochial work did not go unnoticed. The Huddersfield & District Chronicle said: "indeed he raised the organisation of St Andrew's parish to such a pitch of perfection that it became noted throughout the borough for the efficiency and thoroughness of its church life." He was described as ". . . a most assiduous and energetic parish worker," and as "an able and interesting preacher." He was noted for "his forcible pulpit utterances and earnest parochial work in attracting and maintaining a large congregation, in addition to the various organisations which an efficiently worked parish always possesses." Due to being "handicapped very considerably" by his poor health he was assisted in the fulfilment of his duties "in the most hearty manner" by his wife.

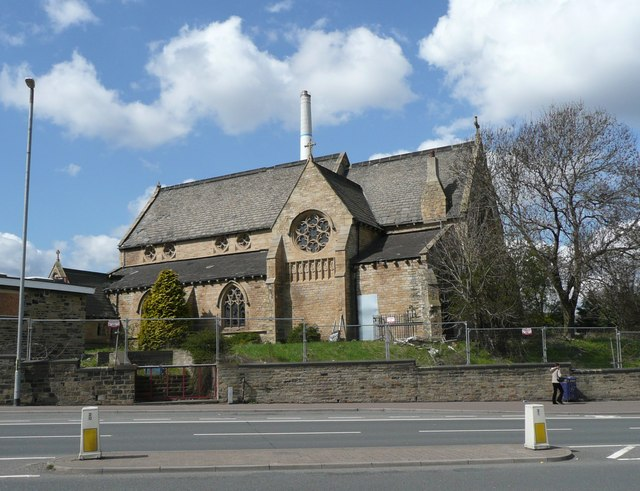
St Andrew's Church, Huddersfield, now disused

When he left this position, a subscription was held among his congregation and 80 people, many of them poor, contributed small sums towards two testimonials which were presented to Charles and his wife on the evening of 25 March 1887. Due to Charles' delicate state of health the presentation could not be public, so a deputation of gentlemen was sent to his house. They brought Charles a "handsome and valuable" gold watch, on the back of which was engraved his monogram, with the text inscribed inside: "Presented by the congregation of St Andrew's Church, Huddersfield, to the Rev Charles Farrar Forster, vicar, in token of their appreciation of his seven years' earnest work amongst them. March 1887." For Mary they brought a "chaste and artistic" lady's inlaid rosewood davenport. It carried the inscription: "Presented to Mrs C.F. Forster (on her leaving Huddersfield) by the congregation of St Andrew's Church, as a mark of their affection and esteem, March 1887." In their speeches of thanks, both Charles and Mary alluded to the great accord and friendship that they had experienced in the parish.

To demonstrate the kind of ceremonial life which Forster experienced during his ministry, here is an account of a funeral which he attended. On Wednesday 3 September 1890, he returned to Huddersfield with his father-in-law, James Priestley JP, to attend the grand funeral of Alderman John Varley JP (1836–1890), a wealthy, "brusque" and "rugged" coal-merchant with his finger in many pies, who had died of apoplexy. This involved a very long procession, robed or uniformed, winding its way on foot to the tolling of muffled bells from Varley's house, Springfield, Newsome to the church of St John the Evangelist, Newsome. It was headed by eighty policemen, nine firemen, over forty members of Huddersfield Borough Council and several Freemasons. Next came two carriages bearing priests and doctors, then the hearse flanked by walking bearers from the mill of Vickerman & Sons. About eight carriages containing chief mourners and local VIPs followed the hearse; then came many more VIPs on foot, including local politicians, and six private carriages containing more VIPs followed these. All along the road house-blinds were closed as the hearse drew near. When the procession passed by the mills, machinery stopped, flags dropped to half-mast and the workers lined the route, heads bowed. The surpliced choir met the procession at the church lychgate. Forster was waiting in the church to attend the service, being too infirm to take part in the procession.

After Forster died, he was well-remembered at St Andrews:

[At St Andrew's] he ministered in season and out of season according to his strength and power . . . labouring patiently and diligently as an able preacher, a vigorous organiser, a wise manager of the schools, a painstaking parish priest, and in all things approved himself to be a Man of God. In those days this church was crowded to overflowing, for many came from far to hear his wise and loving words.^{Huddersfield Chronicle, 18 September 1894}

The Church Times published an In Memoriam for Charles:

Mr Forster had for some years suffered a painful and distressing malady which he bore, however, with remarkable fortitude . . . A man of strong will, sound judgement and prompt decision, he influenced to no slight extent the Church life in Huddersfield while vicar of St Andrew's in that town; where he will ever be remembered for the definiteness of his teaching, the heartiness and reverence which characterised the services of his church, and for the well organised and successful day and Sunday schools connected therewith.^{Huddersfield Chronicle, 18 September 1894}

=== St Michael and All Angels, Beckwithshaw ===
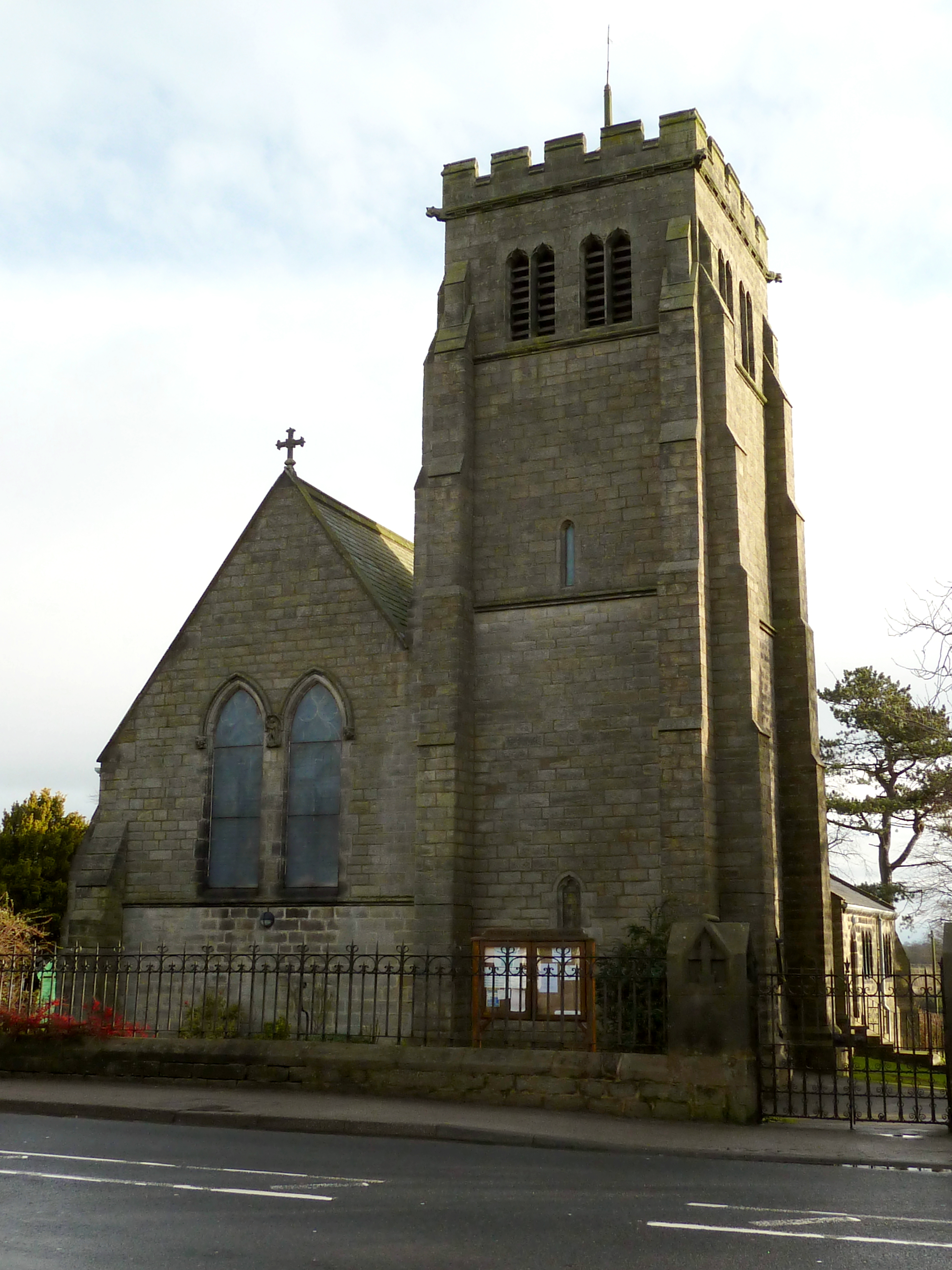
St Michael and All Angels, Beckwithshaw

In 1887 he resigned the living at St Andrew's and became the first vicar of the recently consecrated St Michael and All Angels Church at Beckwithshaw, because it was hoped that his health would improve in the "comparative retirement" of this "quiet and secluded parish". He was nominated to the living of £200 per annum and the promise of a future vicarage by Dr Williams of Moor Park; his preferment was announced on 7 January 1887 and he was licensed to the post by the Bishop of Ripon on 17 March 1887. He was a fellow of the Royal Geographical Society and was one of many members of that society to be innocently duped by the Society of Science, Letters and Art, London. He was a member of the Pannal School Board, and he concerned himself with the welfare of the Church. It was his success in dealing with parochial institutions and his "practical pulpit utterances," making St Andrew's a foremost church in its district, which recommended him for this new position.

However, village life was not as tranquil as Forster might have expected. On 1 June 1887, after collecting some scrap metal, blacksmiths Thomas Sadler and Anthony Pratt of Harrogate were drinking at the Smiths Arms opposite Beckwithshaw Church. On the way home, Pratt appeared too inebriated to walk and was left in a field by his friend. Sadler returned to find Pratt foaming at the mouth and dying. It was concluded that the cause of death at age 42 was excessive drinking.

Forster took an interest in clerical matters. On the afternoon of 11 April 1889, he attended a large Anglican church meeting at Harrogate Church Institute, headed by the Earl of Harewood, the Bishop of Ripon, the Bishop of Penrith, Mr Joseph Dent Dent of Ribston Hall, and a large contingent of local clergy. The stated subject of the meeting was the reorganisation of the Ripon Diocesan Societies, but the content was a move by the Bishop of Ripon for funds to support pensions for retired clergy, nine-tenths of whom did not have independent means. The meeting enthusiastically supported this motion. Sadly, Forster was not to live long enough to benefit from this improvement of the clerical lot. He supported the Church Institute which in turn supported the clergy, and he attended the annual bazaar, a three-day occasion in aid of its building fund.

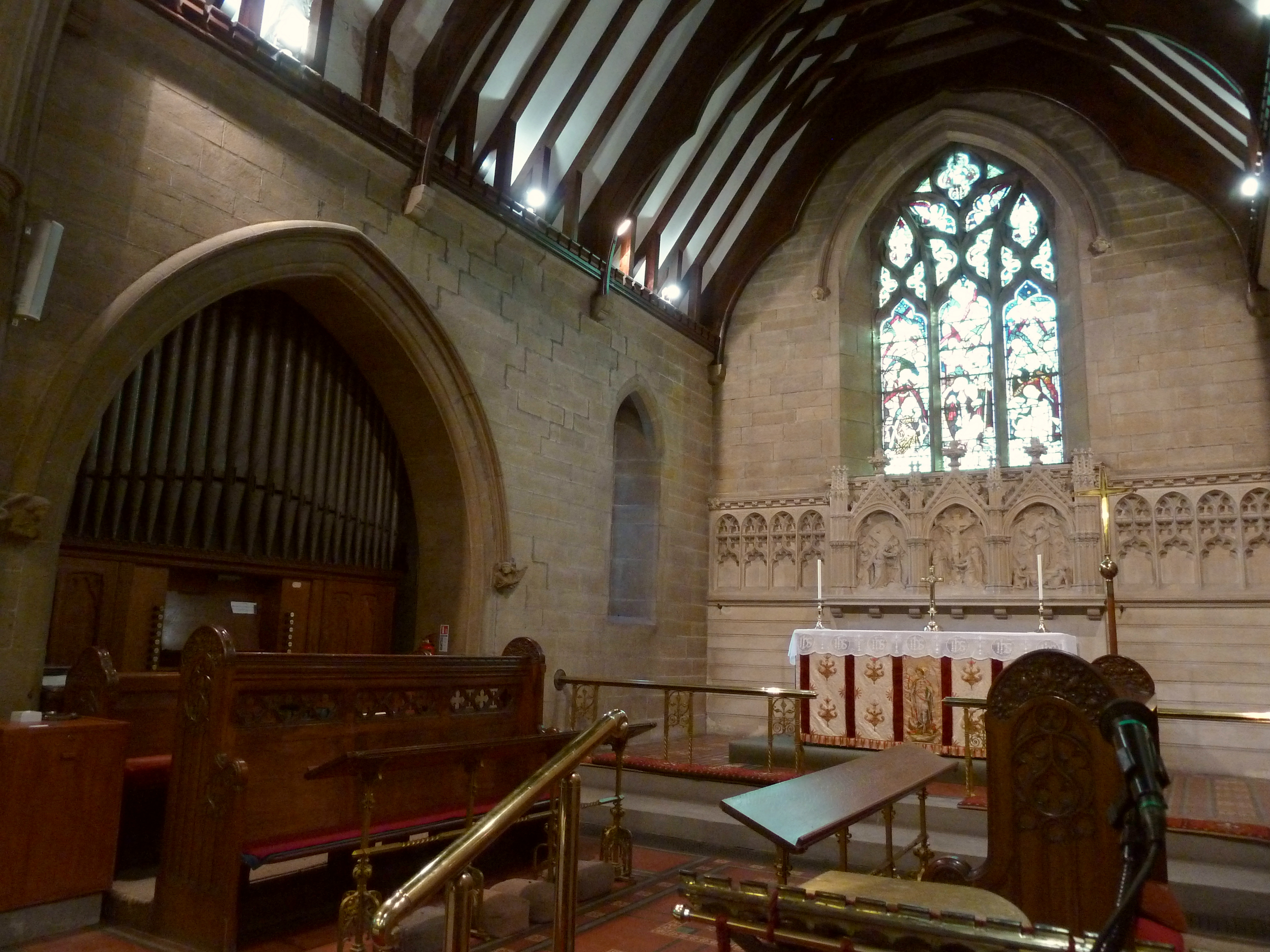
Chancel where altar rails were covered with wreaths at Forster's funeral

Forster served in Beckwithshaw for just seven years, and died on 28 August 1894. His funeral and interment took place on 1 September. In Beckwithshaw, "in all absence of gloom" the church was crowded at the funeral service, while in the village blinds were drawn and "signs of marked sorrow were visible on every hand." While the body was laid in the chancel, the congregation laid wreaths of flowers along the altar rail. Charles Wesley's hymn Blessing, honour, thanks and praise was sung, and Mark Rowntree read the lesson before the choir sang the canticle Nunc Dimittis. At the graveside service were medical officers from the local hospitals, an alderman, a councillor, numerous curates and vicars including Frank Shaw of St Andrew's, Huddersfield, D. M. Thomas, the curate of Beckwithshaw, and Mark Rowntree, vicar of Pannal. Mr and Mrs Henry Williams, patrons of the living of Beckwithshaw, were there too.

The funeral cortège travelled on foot more than a mile to the cemetery. The clergy and choir were robed; the choirboys carrying all the flowers: a "picturesque appearance of reverential sorrow." At the cemetery, the grave was lined with ivy and flowers, and W. Binner conducted the service in "a most impressive manner." Numerous relatives of Charles and his wife were present, although newspaper reports do not say that Mary herself was there. The choir sang For All the Saints. The polished oak coffin had heavy brass mountings and a brass cross on the lid. According to the Huddersfield Chronicle of 1894, the cross and its pedestal were inscribed, "Charles Farrar Forster, priest, born 29th February 1848; passed to rest 28th August 1894." However the existing inscription as of 2014 is as follows:

"In memory of Charles Farrar Forster, priest. First vicar of the adjoining parish of Beckwithshaw 1887 to 1894. Passed to rest on the 28th day of August 1894 aged 46. My presence shall go with thee and I will give thee rest. This cross was erected by the members of his congregation."

On the evening of Sunday 9 September 1894 a memorial service was held for Forster at St Andrew's Church, Huddersfield. There was a large congregation. The organist, H. J. Wood, ARCO, played the voluntary Cantilene Pastorale by Guilmant. There were psalms and hymns, and lessons were read by the vicar, W. F. Shaw. The choir sang an anthem which was followed by a sermon from the vicar. The congregation stood while the organist played the Dead March from Saul. The closing voluntary was Guilmant's Funeral March. At Beckwithshaw he was remembered thus:

[At Beckwithshaw] he preferred to labour on and to die in harness . . . He was troubled with a dangerous disease which at times caused him agonies of excruciating pain. Yet through it all he was calm, patient, collected.^{Huddersfield Chronicle, 18 September 1894}

The Church Times said:

Appointed first vicar of the new parish of Beckwithshaw in 1887, he set himself to build up, slowly but surely, the life of his people . . . and while he taught the fulness of the truth, and symbolised it in simple yet reverent form, he failed not by the bright example of his own life - so consistent, so nobly patient under the severest trials - to give a forcible illustration of the yielded will and godly endeavour of a Christian man.^{Huddersfield Chronicle, 18 September 1894}

In July 2005, over a hundred years after Forster's death, his great-nephew visited Beckwithshaw Church, showing that he is still remembered by his family.
