= Pram service =

Informal Anglican Church religious service

A pram service is an informal Anglican Church religious service, such as eucharist or morning prayer, specifically tailored for babies and toddlers (up to five years of age), along with their parents, guardians, or child minders, and which is named for the British word for what Americans call a baby carriage. The short, informal service typically includes communion or prayer, singing, and age-appropriate Biblical stories, followed by a snack and hot beverages, play time, and informal conversation.

The service may be led by the vicar, or, more often, by a layperson, or Mothers Union volunteer. The mothers may lead the service themselves. Women in the priesthood may have gotten their first experience leading religious services with such forms of worship.

== History ==
Pram services have been conducted in Anglican and Methodist churches for at least thirty years, since the 1980s. Today, non-denominational Christian churches may also hold pram services. In 2014, it was called a "Messy Church and Pram Service". It is sometimes referred to as a 'toddler service'.

== Setting ==
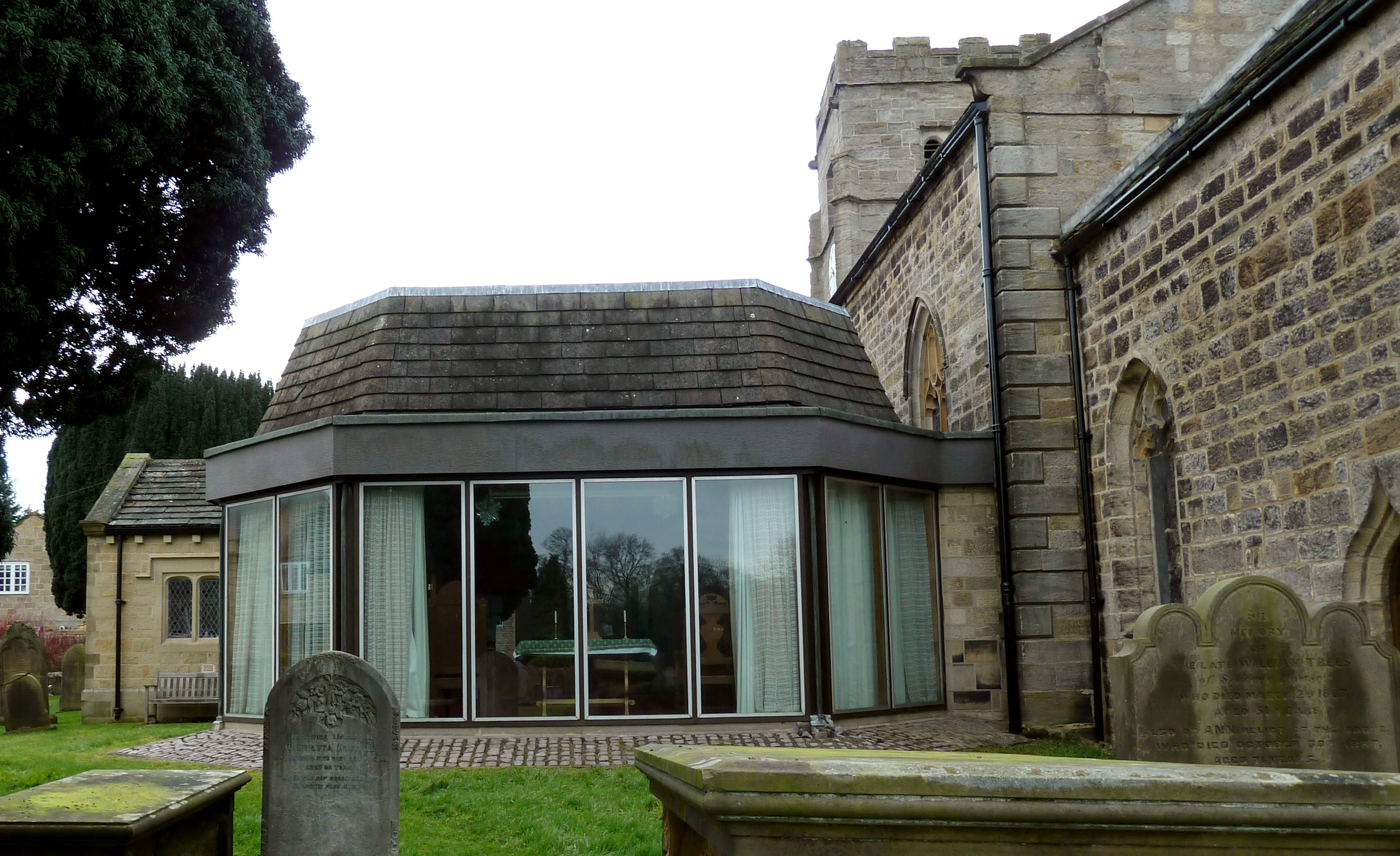
The chapter house of St Robert's Church, Pannal, at which a pram service is conducted.

A pram service is often held on a weekday morning, but may be held mid-afternoon (2:00 or 2:15 p.m.), with sufficient time for the children's guardians to pick up older children after the end of the school day. While it can be held in the church, the informal service can also be conducted in the chapter house the chancel, church house, or community center. A popular "how-to" guide to children's programming advises that when running a monthly pram service, make it as simple and in familiar circumstances as possible, to draw in parents who might "not feel at ease in a church."

The purposes of the service are to provide an opportunity for adults to meet others, as well as catechism and new friends for the children. Some parents just use the chance to get away from housekeeping for an hour. The cost is usually free; however, the church may ask for a small donation. The service can be used for evangelism of younger people.

== Notable churches with pram services ==
- Church of St Michael and All Angels, Beckwithshaw
- St Robert's Church, Pannal
- Wymondham Abbey
- St Oswald's Church, Sowerby

== In popular culture ==
Pram services may be used as a plot device or back story in British fiction. For example, in the novel Heaven Spent by Janice B. Scott, Polly uses the service to entice young parents with "an old-fashioned high tea" that church was worth attending on Sunday afternoons, but it involved hours of preparation. The Harlequin novel, A Secret Infatuation, includes a scene in which a parishioner must see the priest about helping the Mothers Union form a pram service. In the dramatic novel The Dark Mirror, the church starts a successful pram service.

== See also ==
- Early childhood education
- Sunday school
