= Beckwithshaw =

Village and civil parish in North Yorkshire, England

Coordinates: 53.973460°N 1.593210°W

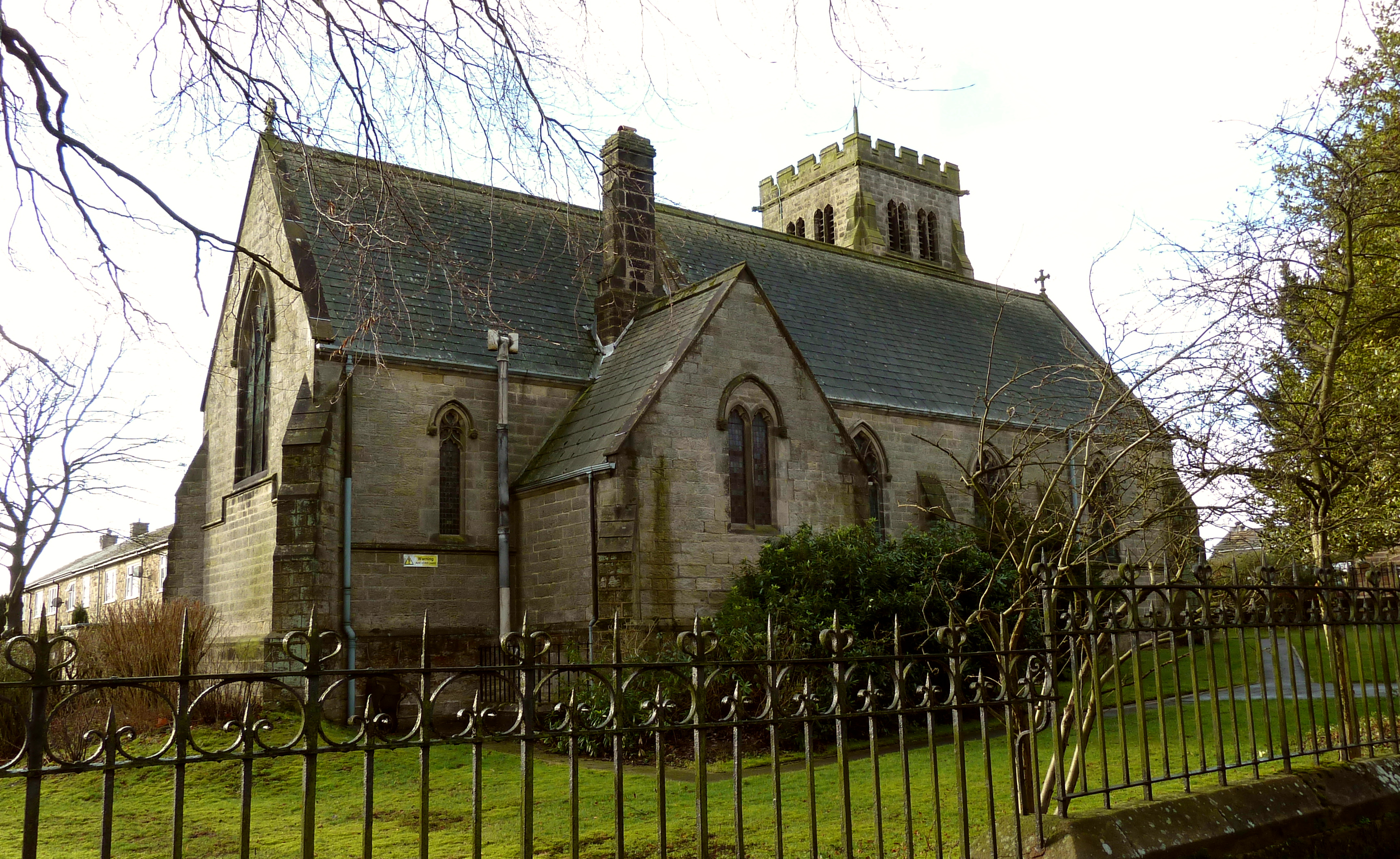
- Church of St Michael and All Angels (2014)

- Location within North Yorkshire
- Area: 3.43245 sq mi (8.8900 km^{2})
- Population: 425 (Including Haverah Park 2011 census)
  - Density: 124/sq mi (48/km^{2})
- OS grid reference: SE267531
  - London: 181.51 mi (292.11 km)
- Civil parish: Haverah Park with Beckwithshaw
- Unitary authority: North Yorkshire
- Ceremonial county: North Yorkshire
- Region: Yorkshire and the Humber
- Country: England
- Sovereign state: United Kingdom
- Post town: HARROGATE
- Postcode district: HG3
- Dialling code: 01423
- Police: North Yorkshire
- Fire: North Yorkshire
- Ambulance: Yorkshire
- UK Parliament: Skipton and Ripon

Beckwithshaw is a village and civil parish in the county of North Yorkshire, England, about 2.5 miles (4 km) south-west of Harrogate. In 2021 the parish had a population of 497.

== History ==
Beckwithshaw takes its name from the now smaller settlement of Beckwith, 1 mile (1.6 km) to the east. The suffix "shaw", first recorded in 1323, is from the Old English sceaga, meaning a copse.

Beckwithshaw was historically a hamlet in the ancient parish of Pannal. When the village of Pannal was removed from the civil parish of Pannal in 1937, Beckwithshaw became the largest settlement in the parish. The name of the civil parish was changed from Pannal to Beckwithshaw in 2010. The parish now shares a grouped parish council with Haverah Park. Until 1974 it was part of the West Riding of Yorkshire. From 1974 to 2023 it was part of the Borough of Harrogate. It is now administered by the unitary North Yorkshire Council.

In 1875, a reservoir was built to the west of the village. Known as Ten Acre Reservoir, it actually only covered 7.7 acres (3.1 ha). In 2016, a report was commissioned into its future as the dam head was known to be failing. In 2019, it will be drained so that it only contains 176,573 cubic feet (5,000 m^{3}) of water to relieve pressure on the dam head and will also be converted into a wildlife area.

== Amenities ==
The village has a primary school, a pub (The Smiths Arms) and the Anglican Church of St Michael and All Angels. A board in the church names all the vicars, the first being Charles Farrar Forster, who served from 1887 until his death in August 1894. The church benefice is shared with St Robert's Church, Pannal. A post office was opened in the village in 1887 but closed in October 1978.

== Sport and leisure ==
=== Cricket ===
Beckwithshaw Cricket Club is an English amateur cricket club founded in 1885. The club ground is on Killinghall Road. Beckwithshaw fields three senior teams in the Airedale & Wharfedale Senior Cricket League, a midweek evening team in the Harrogate & District Amateur Evening League, a women's team in the Yorkshire Women's Soft Ball Cricket league, and a junior training section that plays competitive cricket in the Nidderdale Junior Cricket League.

=== Eventing ===
Beckwithshaw Horse Trials, organised by British Eventing, is an annual cross country event held at Beaver Horse Shop on Windmill Farm.

== See also ==
- Listed buildings in Beckwithshaw
