= Church of St Michael and All Angels, Beckwithshaw =

Anglican church in North Yorkshire, England

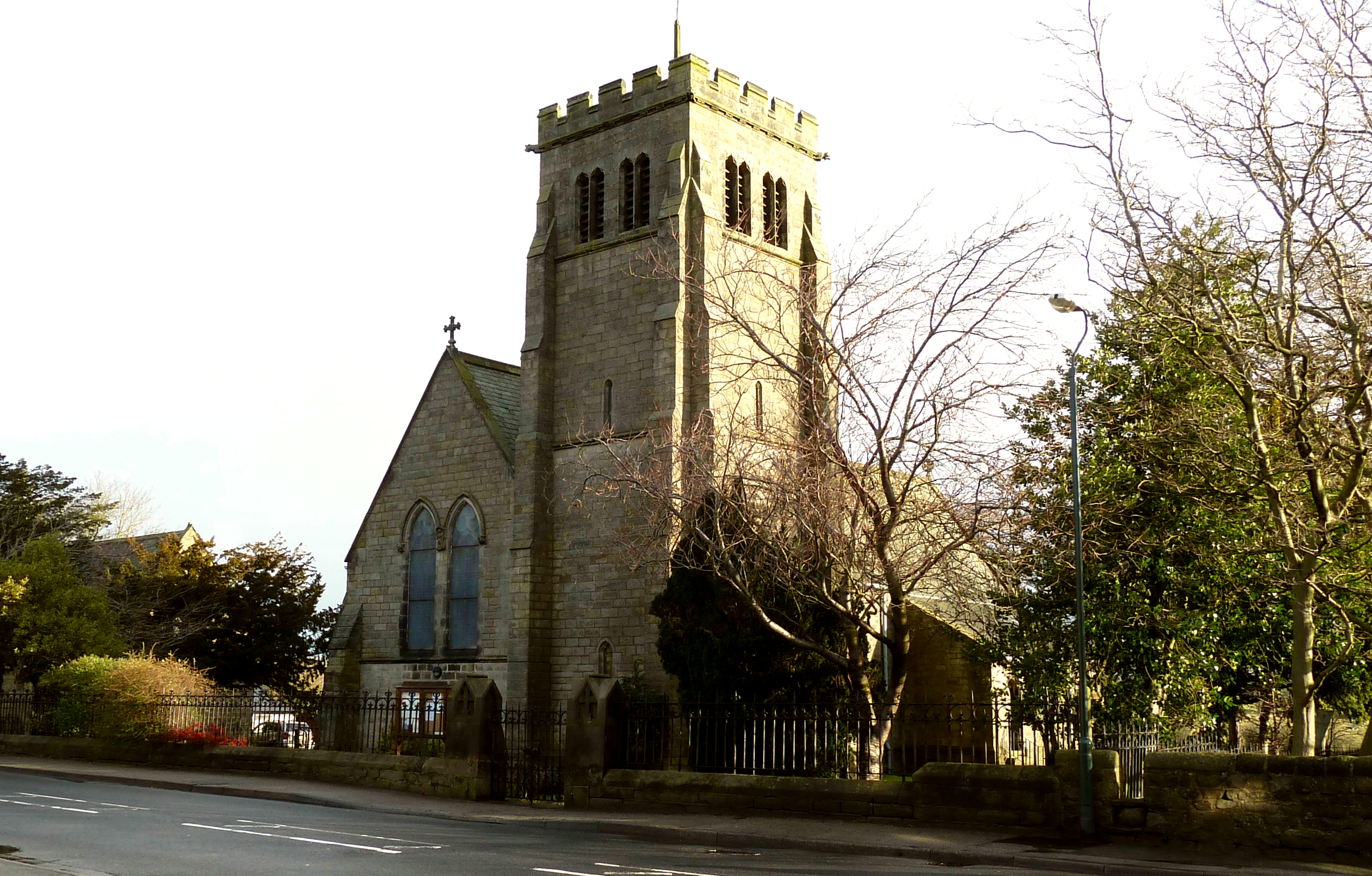
- Beckwithshaw Church, 2014

- Location in North Yorkshire
- 53°58′25″N 1°35′36″W
- OS grid reference: SE267625
- Location: Church Row, Beckwithshaw, North Yorkshire, HG3 1QW
- Country: England
- Denomination: Church of England
- Churchmanship: Central
- Website: stmichaelsbeckwithshaw.org

History
- Status: Parish church
- Founded: 1886
- Dedication: St Michael and All Angels
- Dedicated: 1886
- Consecrated: 1886

Architecture
- Functional status: Active
- Heritage designation: Grade II listed
- Architect(s): W. Swinden Barber, FRIBA; Contractor: James Simpson
- Architectural type: Church of England parish church
- Style: Arts and Crafts movement Gothic Revival

Administration
- Diocese: Leeds
- Archdeaconry: Richmond (301)
- Deanery: Harrogate (30104)
- Parish: Ecclesiastical parish of St Robert of Knaresborough, Pannal (300230 30/230)

Clergy
- Vicar(s): The Revd John Smith (with Pannal)

The Church of St Michael and All Angels, Beckwithshaw, North Yorkshire, England, also known as Beckwithshaw Church, is an Anglican church built and furnished between 1886 and 1887 by William Swinden Barber in the Gothic Revival style as part of the Arts and Crafts movement. The stained glass windows in the same style were added in 1892. The church is listed as a Grade II historic structure; it is a pristine and unchanged example of an Arts and Crafts church retaining all its original furnishings, apart from one missing statue. However, in 2018 the church officers gained planning permission for changes which included removing all of the original pews. The first vicar of this church, from 1887 to 1894, was Charles Farrar Forster.

== Location ==
When the church was built in the late 19th century, Beckwithshaw was a little hamlet, about two and a half miles from Harrogate, and its ecclesiastical district had to be carved from Pannal parish. In 1886 the view was described thus:

"In the immense sweep of country which meets the view from the higher grounds lying between Harrogate and Otley and which, beautiful as it is, conveys an idea of loneliness to the mind from the very few habitations that are seen, the eye rests with a sense of relief upon the newly-erected edifice at Beckwithshaw."^{The Yorkshire Post and Leeds Intelligencer, 1886}

However, in January and February 1885 there had been an outbreak of scarlet fever, and the school was closed for at least six weeks. As of 2014 Beckwithshaw is a small village.

== Funding, design and construction ==
=== Donors ===
Dr Henry Williams and his wife lived at Moor Park House, built in 1859 in Beckwithshaw, and acquired by them in 1882. The household and estate, expanded in 1882, employed many local people until the late 1970s when Harrison Developments of Leeds bought the buildings and converted them into flats. The church was built "entirely at their own expense." They funded the building at £8,000, with an endowment of £5,000.

Mrs Williams insisted that there should be no graveyard at the church site, and a contemporary local tendency to fear of the subject may have some bearing on this decision. Arabella Elizabeth Tetley, a Beckwithshaw schoolmaster's wife, died of puerperal fever at age 23 years and was buried at Woodhouse Cemetery on Friday 17 April 1888. However gravedigger Fred Posey thought he saw "an upheaval of the earth which he had placed upon the coffin and heard a creak which led him to believe that the buried woman was alive and trying to wrench the lid away." He raised the alarm, saying that he had heard "rattling" in the coffin, and a "knocking such as I never heard afore in a grave" in 42 years of gravedigging. There was an exhumation and an inquest which ruled that there had been no disturbance within the coffin, so that the verdict was "natural causes."

=== Architect ===
The architect was William Swinden Barber, FRIBA (fl.1855–1898) of Halifax. His listed works include at least fifteen other buildings, mostly Anglican, Neo-Gothic, Arts and Crafts churches within West Yorkshire. Barber designed and commissioned all interior decoration and furnishings for his buildings.

=== Builder ===
The contractor for the work was James Simpson (1825–1891) of Harrogate. In 1881 he was aged 56 and living at 22 Parliament Terrace, Harrogate, near Bettys, with his wife Ellen aged 53, and his son David aged 21, a stonemason. He and his son were born in Harrogate; his wife was born at Burniston near Scarborough. He was an Alderman whose daughter died in 1890 by falling from a railway carriage at Starbeck, and Simpson won £100 damages for negligence from the North Eastern Railway Company.

== History ==
Before this church was built, the congregation had to travel to the Church of All Saints, Harlow Hill, and then to a local school room for services. The foundation stone for this church was laid on 29 September 1884. The day was the feast day of St Michael and Mrs Williams' birthday.

=== Consecration in 1886 ===
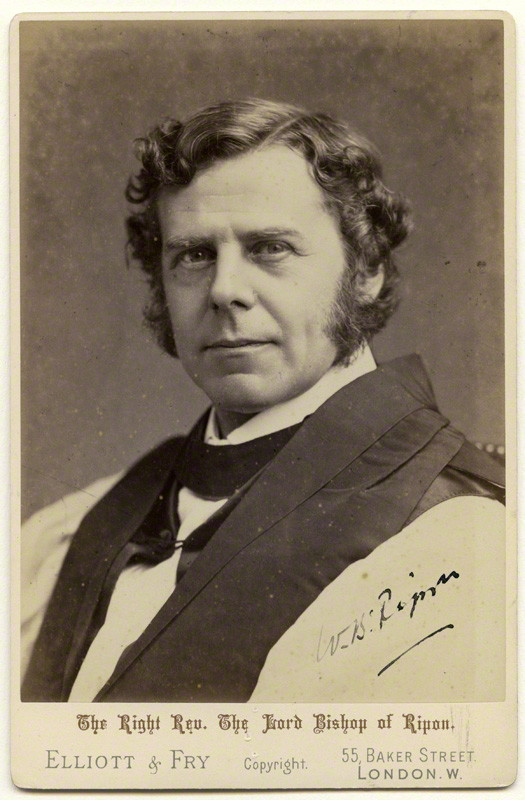
William Boyd Carpenter, Bishop of Ripon 1884–1912

The church was completed in 1886 and it was dedicated and consecrated by Mrs Williams' uncle, The Bishop of Ripon, at Michaelmas, Thursday 29 September. (On the afternoon of the same day, the bishop consecrated another church also dedicated to St Michael and All Angels at Cottingley, near Bingley.) The church was filled, although Beckwithshaw was at that time just a hamlet with a few surrounding farmhouses. There was a grand procession into the church, headed by the robed choir. Behind them came the churchwardens, one of which was Henry Williams the donor, then the Bishop of Ripon in full vestments. Behind them followed many robed clergymen, including Samuel Owen Madden the Dean of Cork, Henry Stewart the Dean of Dromore, Rev. Canon William Winter Gibbon, MA, vicar of Christ Church, High Harrogate, Rev. Dr A. Buck of St Mary's Church, Stainburn, Rev. Mark Rowntree, MA, of St Robert's Church, Pannal, Rev. G.O. Brownrigg, MA, vicar of St Mary's Harrogate, Rev. R.G. Brownrigg of St Mary's, Harrogate, Rev. A. Robinson of St John the Evangelist Church, Bilton, Rev. T.F. Buckton of Christ Church, High Harrogate, and Rev. H. Kershaw of St Mary's Church, Greenhow Hill. Gibbon, Rowntree and Buck conducted the service, because the church did not yet have its own vicar. The organ was not yet installed, so a Miss Burnley played a harmonium, which may at that time have been placed within the organ arch. The choir was made up of local residents who had been trained by the new choirmaster, Mr Halliwell. The bishop preached the sermon, after which there was a collection amounting to £11 13s., for the Wakefield Bishopric Fund.

=== Jubilee in 1936 ===
The jubilee of the church's consecration was celebrated on the evening of 30 September 1936, with a special service conducted by the Rev. H.R. Stott who had served as vicar of the parish for the preceding forty-two years. The Bishop of Ripon gave the sermon. By this time Mr and Mrs Henry Williams of Moor Park had died, but in the intervening years since funding the building and endowing the vicar's living, they had given a vicarage, the church furnishings, and the village institute. Since their deaths, their relatives had made more "substantial gifts" to the church and increased the value of the benefice. In the same year the church fabric and the organ were renovated at a total cost of £360.

== Building ==
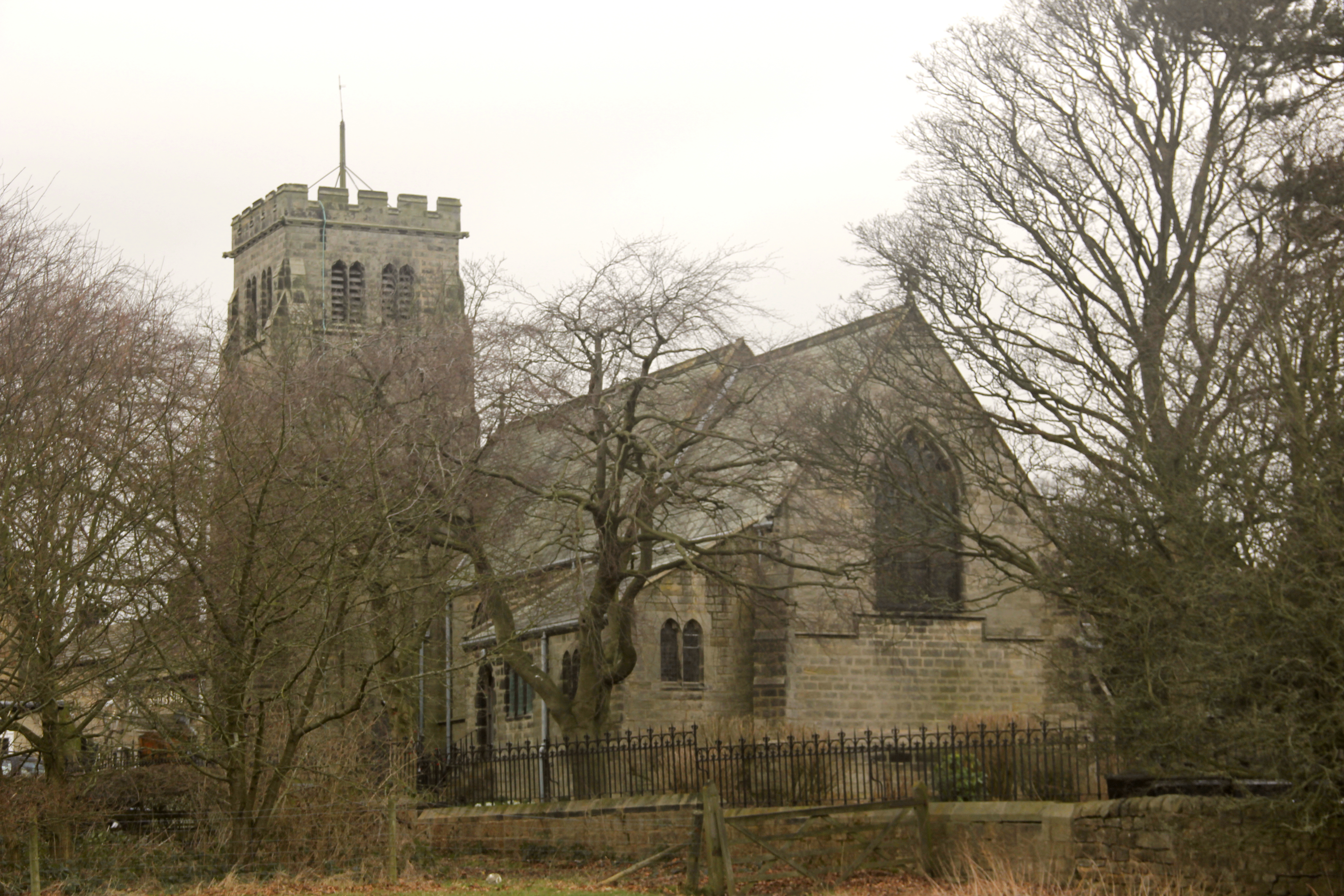
View from field behind church

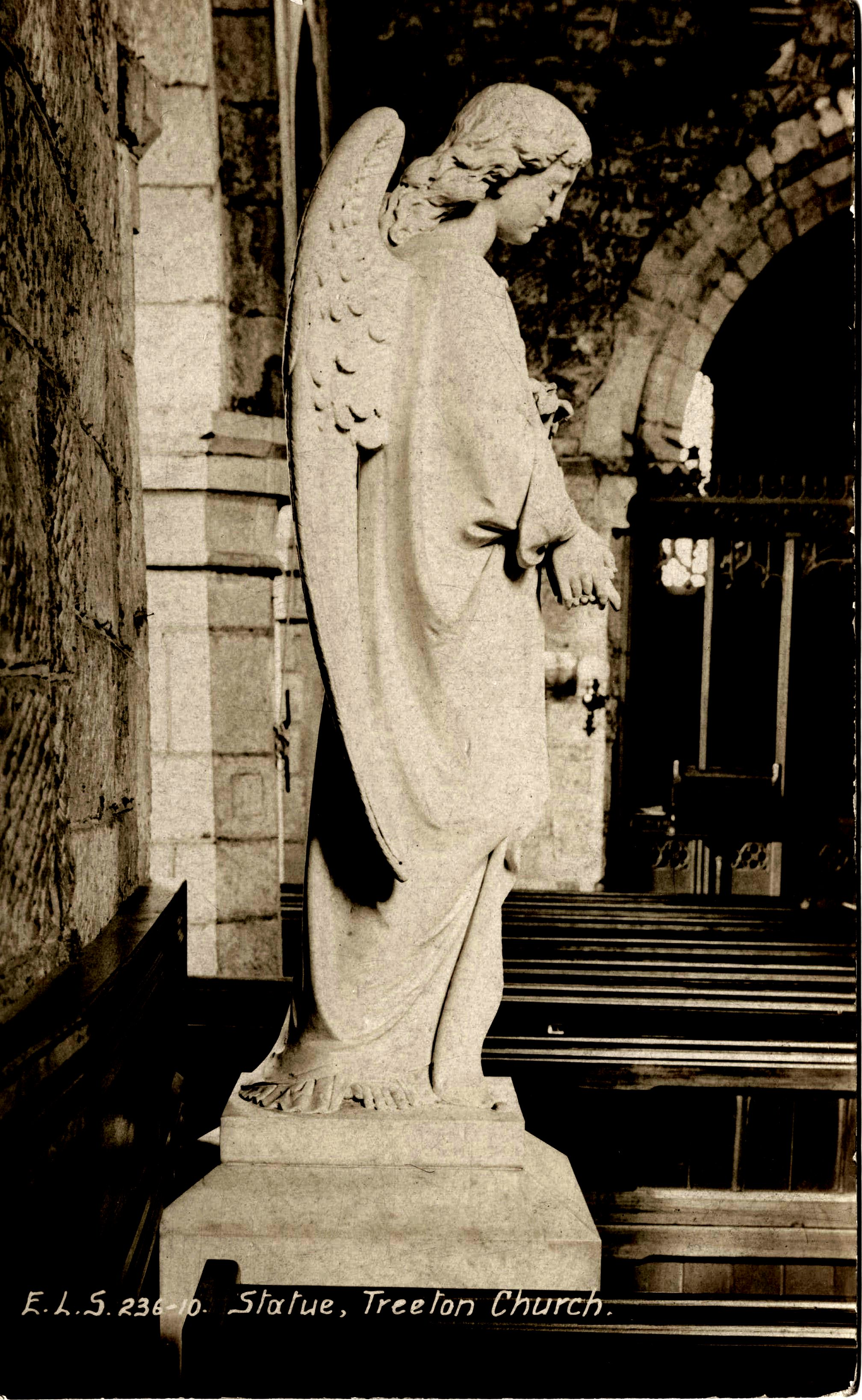
St Michael and dragon (just visible behind left arm) in Treeton Church before 1914. This is similar to the missing statue; it is not known whether it is the same one.

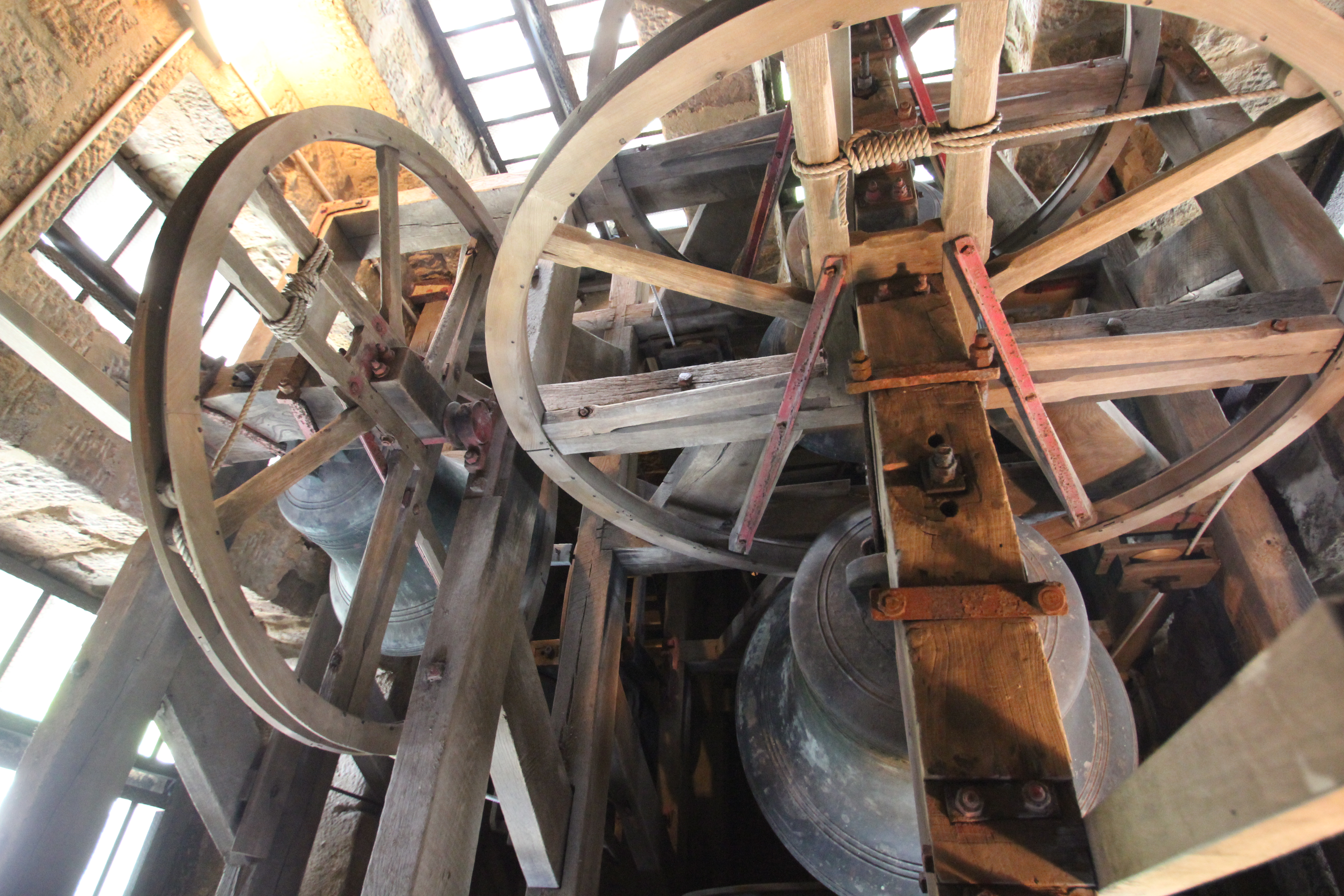
View looking south over top tier of bells, with bell 5 bottom right (hung over bell 6), bell 3 top right (hung over bell 4), and bell 1 left (hung over bell 2)

This structure is fairly similar to its medieval parish church, St Robert's Church, Pannal, with a few exceptions: the tower is attached to the south-west side of the church, and it has a purpose-built organ chamber and vestry which St Robert's does not. It is built of local sandstone from Killinghall quarry. It was described by the York Herald as a "substantial structure, well furnished in the interior, and in every respect suitable as a parish church." However the donors did not want an elaborate building in this countryside location, but settled on a "neat, plain and substantial structure." The building is in pristine condition and remains exactly as it was built and furnished on the day of its consecration in 1886, except for a missing statue described as a "group of St Michael overcoming the Dragon, placed between the west windows of the nave."

=== Tower ===
The exterior shape of the tower is similar to the 15th to 16th century tower of St Robert's Church, Pannal, except that this one has an exterior staircase to the ringer's chamber and belfry. The main western entrance to the church is through the tower, so the ground floor doubles as entrance lobby. There is no public access to the tower.

==== Bells ====
There is no public access to the bellringers' chamber, the belfry or the tower roof. In the tower's bell chamber there are six bells, variously described as "nicely-toned" and "richly-toned," which have been hung for full circle ringing. They were cast at the Whitechapel Bell Foundry in 1886. The name of the company, Mears and Stainbank, is cast into the bells, along with the names of Henry and Ellen Williams the donors, and their children. The diameters of the bells, from smallest to tenor, are: (1) Joshua 28.25in., (2) John 30.75in., (3) Annie 33.25in., (4) Mary 34.75in., (5) Ellen 37in. and (6) Henry 42.75in. The round is D#, C#, B, A#, G#, F#. The tenor bell weighs 13 long cwt 15 lb (1,471 lb or 667 kg). In the bell chamber is a wooden frame consisting of two tiers of three bells each. 1, 3 and 5 hang above 2, 4 and 6, such that 1 is above 2; 3 is above 4; 5 is above 6, putting the heavier bells upon one side, that is, the west side. They are hung thus: "each bell hangs from its original wooden headstock though a restoration has seen the fitting of independent crown staples and ball bearings. The third has an SG clapper whilst those of the others are wrought iron. Traditional stays and sliders."

The reality in the bell-chamber is a very small and roughly-finished room, only partially protected from gales by louvred, unglazed windows on all sides. A massive and braced hardwood frame fills the room completely from west to east. The frame is over 6 feet (1.8 m) high and is smooth and polished to the touch. On the south and north sides there are narrow squeeze spaces of about 1 foot (0.30 m) between the frame and the wall. There is no aid to access to the top of the frame. The wheels of the top tier of bells project above the frame. The frame exactly fits the room, and the bells exactly fit the frame, but only because their wheels are arranged in different directions to allow fit. Access to the roof would require a slim and agile climber who would then climb a ladder, and from the ladder lift and slide with one hand a very heavy insulated trapdoor. The trapdoor is weatherproofed by being shaped to overhang the lips on which it is seated. The survival of the frame and consequently the safety of the bells depends on the condition of this trapdoor and the roof. It is likely that the tower's floors were installed after hanging the bells: the frame could then be built in place, the bells winched from the floor of the tower, and the floors would then be put in. Winching the bells up through the tower would require a massive beam across the tower roof to support the pulley; no such beam exists now.

There is a bell-ringing group which practises on Mondays at 6.30 pm; Ann McGeogh is tower bell captain.

=== Nave ===
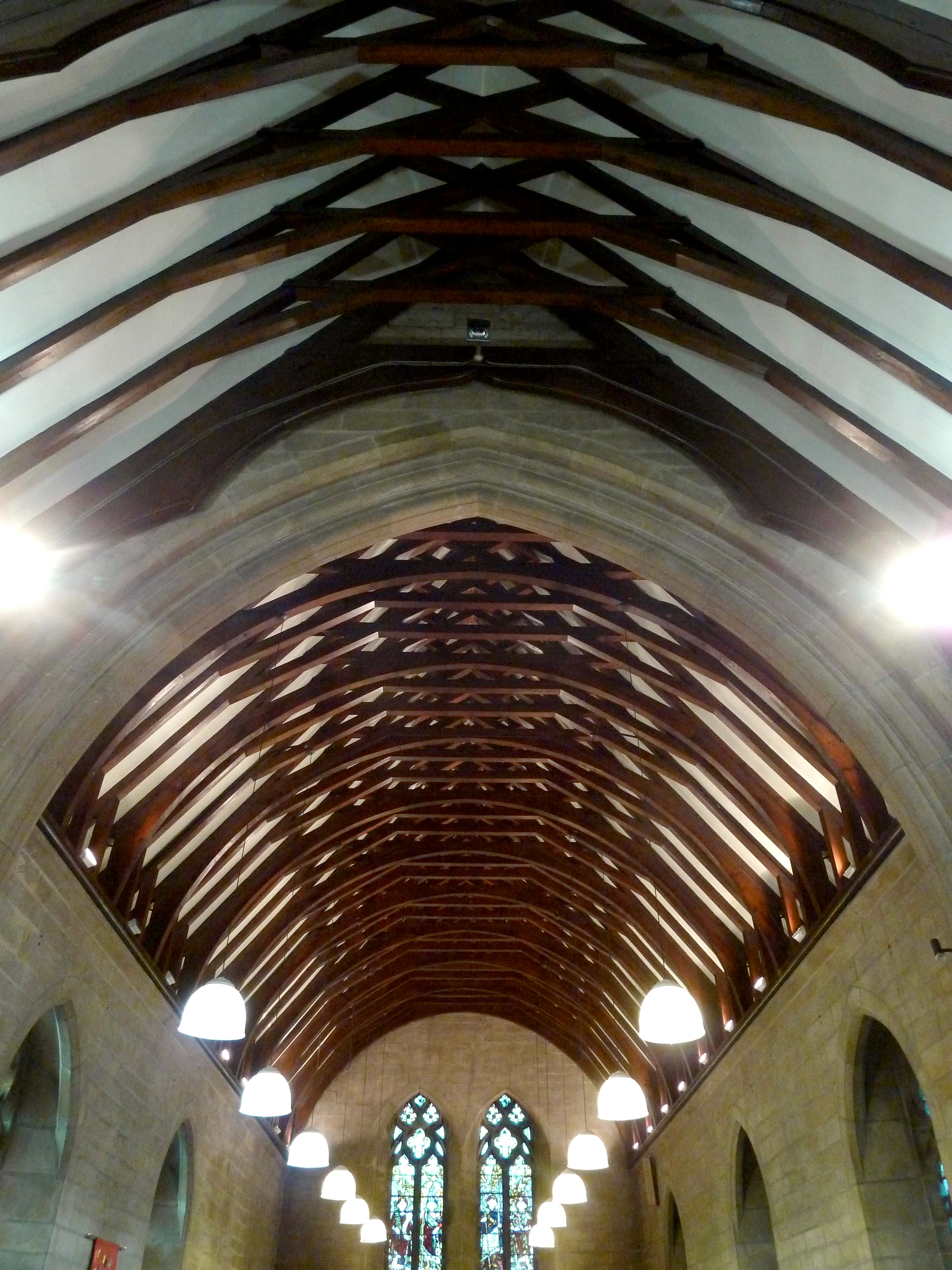
Chancel and nave ceilings

The interior of the building is lined with dressed local stone, and was designed for a congregation of 120 to 150. The pulpit and font were carved by William Pashley in 1886 in Caen stone. At the time of consecration in 1886, there was a carved statue "placed between the west windows of the nave," described as a "group of St Michael overcoming the Dragon." This statue is now missing. To be able to stand between the west windows it would have to be at least 6 feet (1.8 m) on a 3 feet (0.91 m) pedestal, because the windows are 9 feet (2.7 m) from the floor. The name of the artist is unknown, but it may have been carved by William Pashley of Harrogate and Leeds, who also carved some roundels in Leeds Minster.

=== Chancel ===
There is a Caen stone reredos by William Pashley, with "sculptured panels under moulded and crocketted canopies, the walls on either side being enriched with traceried panels. The subjects being presented on the reredos, which is a beautiful work of art, are Bearing the Cross, the Crucifixion, and The Resurrection." "The choir stalls and nave seats are of oak and have sunk traceried panels and foliated ends. The altar-rail, gas standards and rich scroll-work supporting the pulpit rail are of wrought brass. The aisles and chancel floors are paved with tiles in simple patterns."

==== Organ ====
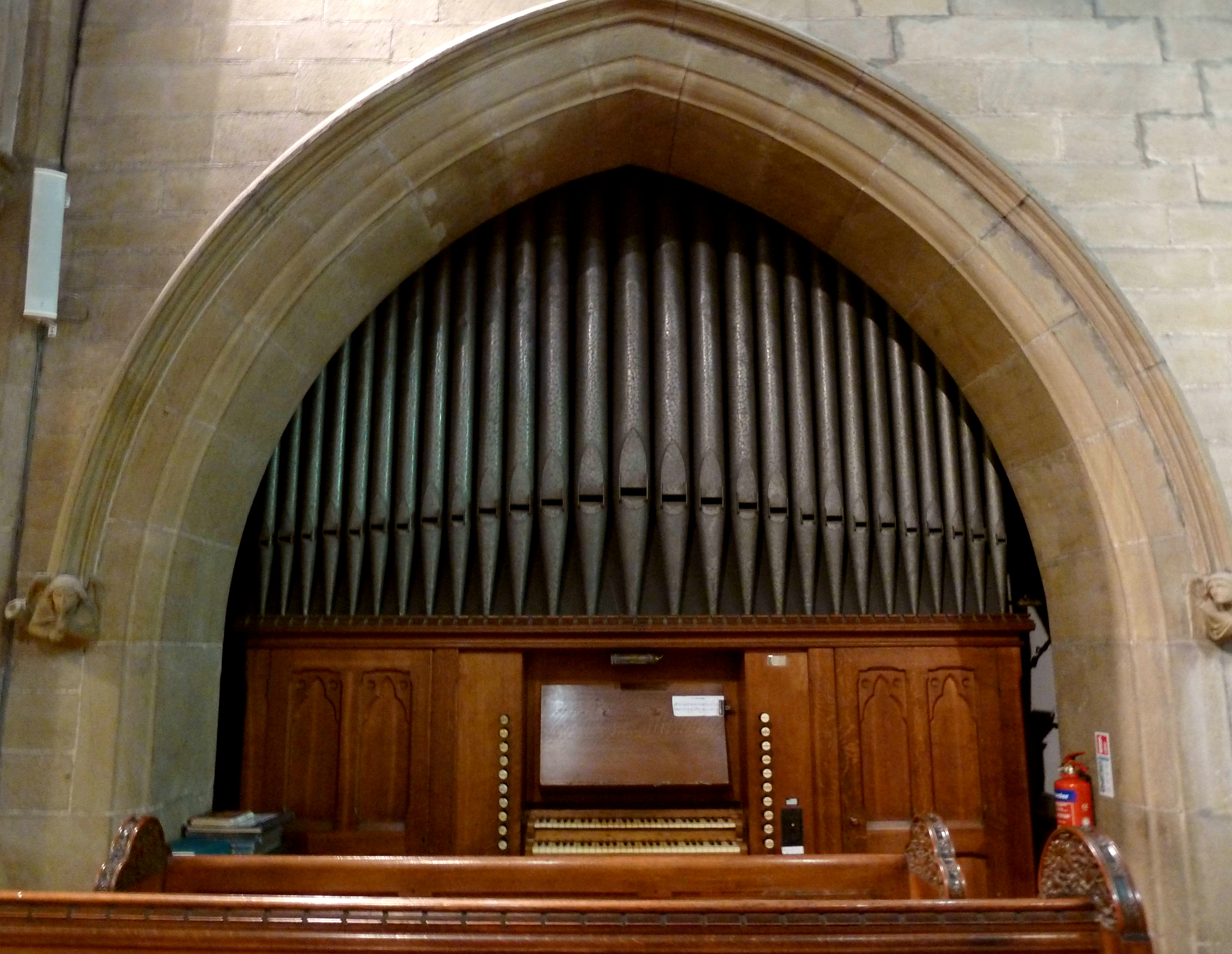
Organ

On Tuesday 20 December 1887, just over a year after the church's dedication, a new organ built by Father Willis of Messrs Willis and Sons of London was installed as a further gift by Mrs Williams. The organ was not an afterthought. It is housed in a lean-to structure against the north wall of the chancel, and its manuals and pipes peer through a specially-cut arch in that same north wall; all this was part of the original design. The lean-to is comfortably blended into the exterior design, and the organ fits neatly into the arch, flush with the wall and sitting close enough to the choir stalls to be used by the choirmaster in rehearsals. It was described as a "very fine instrument . . . contained in a handsome oak case with spotted metal pipes." It has two manuals from CC to G with 56 notes, and 2.5 octaves of concave and radiating pedals from CCC to F: 30 notes. The stops are the original ones, as follows:

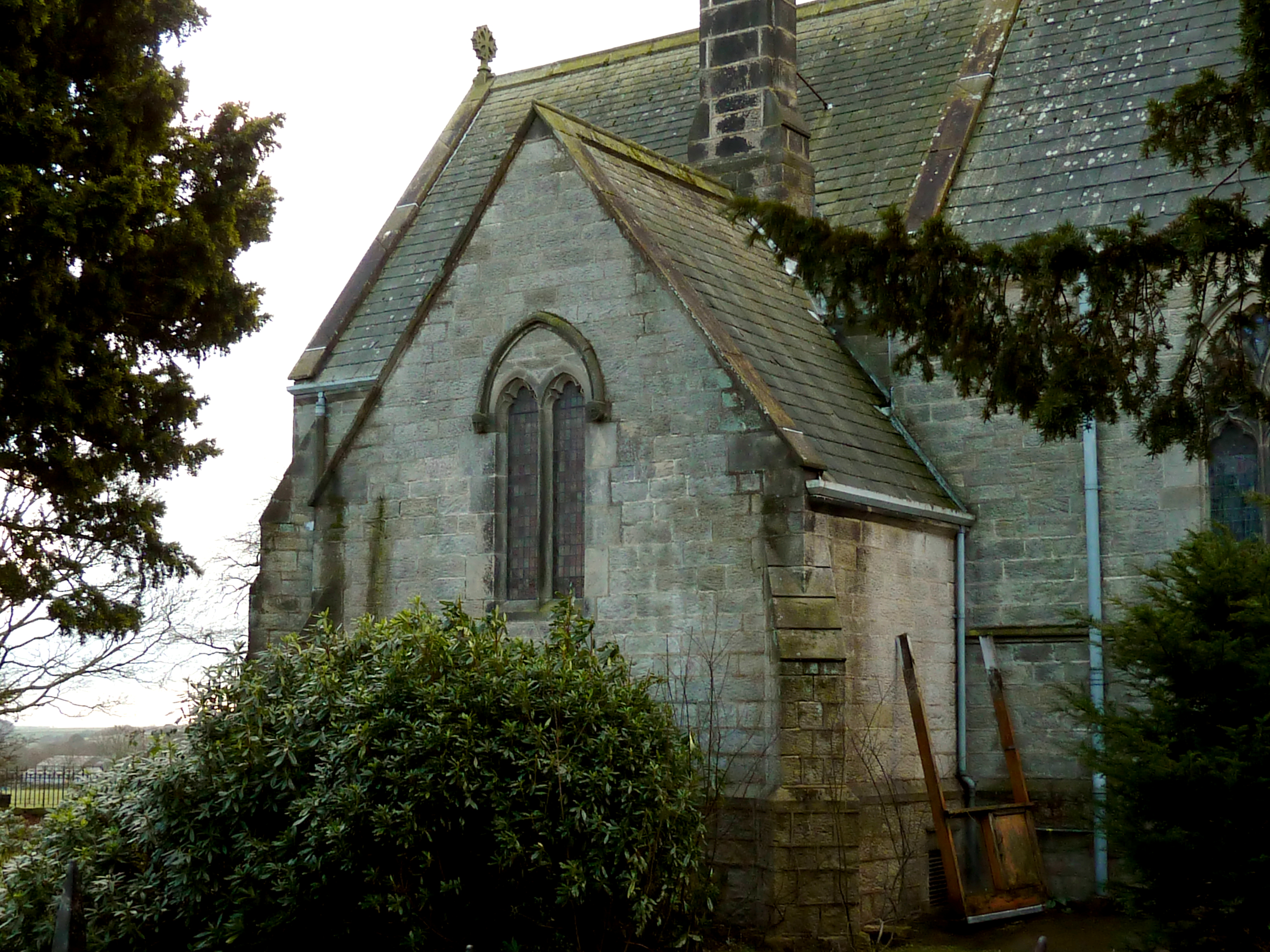
Organ housing

"Great Organ: 1 open diapason 8ft; 2 dulcians 8ft; 3 claribel flute 8ft; 4 flute harmonique 4ft; 5 principal 4ft; 6 fifteenth 2ft; 7 corno-de-bassetto 8ft; Swell: 8 open diapason 8ft; 9 lieblich gedackt 8ft; 10 salicional 8ft; 11 vox angelica 8ft; 12 gemshorn 4ft; 13 flageolet 2ft; 14 cornopean 8ft. Pedals: 15 soubasse 16ft; 16 bourdon 16ft. Couplers: 17 swell to great; 18 swell to pedals; 19 great to pedals. Three composition pedals to great organ."^{York Herald, 24 December 1887}

The Bishop of Ripon returned for the organ's opening day, along with the church's vicar Rev. Charles Farrar Forster and Rev. Mark Rowntree, vicar of Pannal, who read the lesson. As of 2014 the organist was Nigel Duce, who gives regular recitals at Halifax Minster.

==== Windows and carvings ====
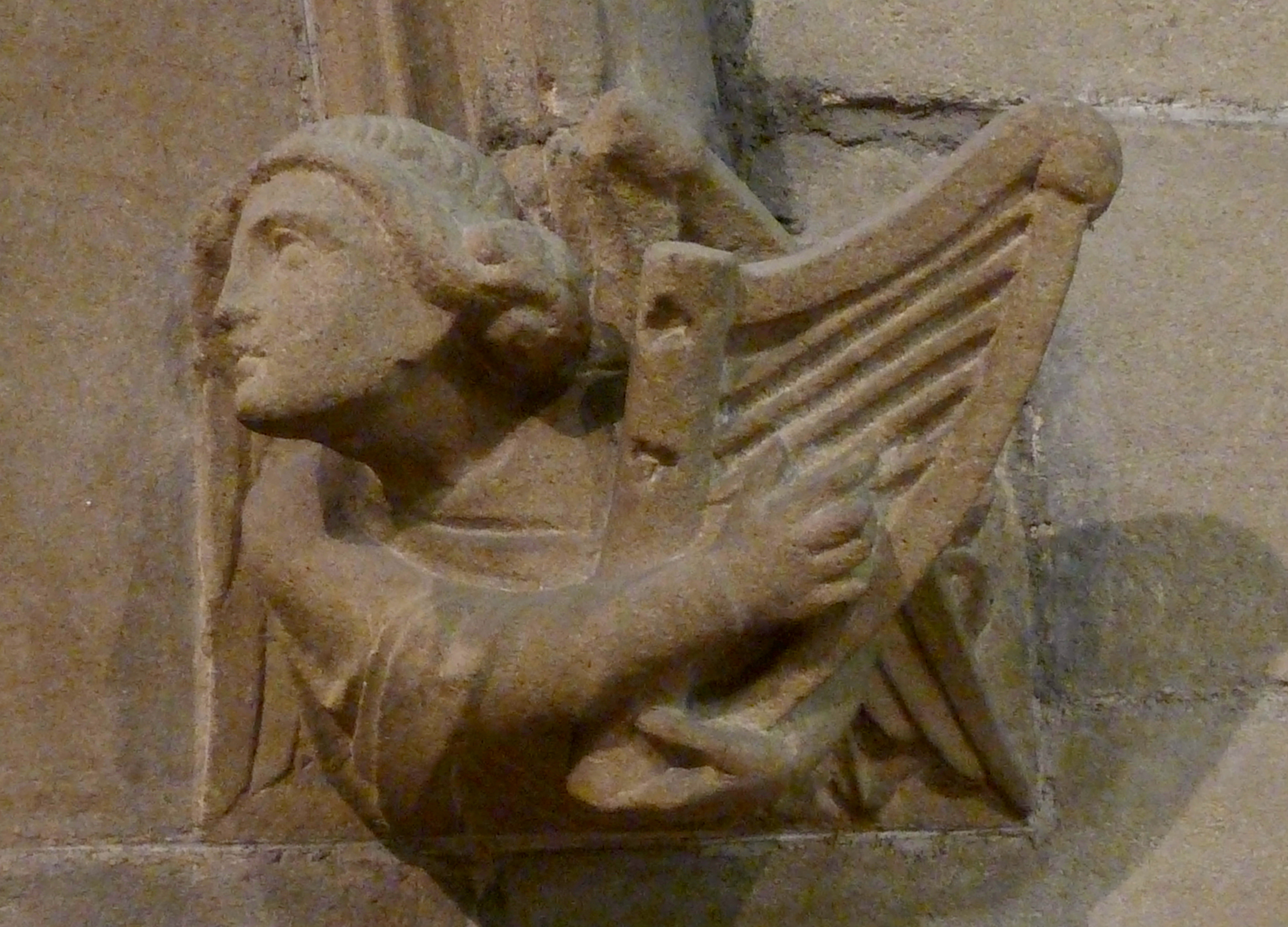
Carving on organ arch

When the window tracery and the carving of the reredos, pulpit and font were created in 1889, they were intended to imitate the style of the mid 14th century in keeping with the Gothic Revival movement.

The east window, installed in 1886, depicts St Michael and all Angels, the Nativity and the Adoration of the Magi in stained glass, drawn and painted by Charles Eamer Kempe. The two lights of the west window, also installed in 1886, show archangels Gabriel, Uriel, Michael and Raphael.

On Sunday 26 June 1892, five new stained glass windows, also by Kempe, were dedicated at a special service with a choir and large congregation. The vicar of Luddenden gave the sermon, the Rev. C.F. Forster, vicar of St Michael's, read the prayers, and Mr G.H. Wood was organist. The windows had been presented by Henry Williams of Moor Park, John Dugdale and Master J. Appleyard-Williams. the subject for the images is taken from Revelations: St John's visions in the Isle of Patmos.

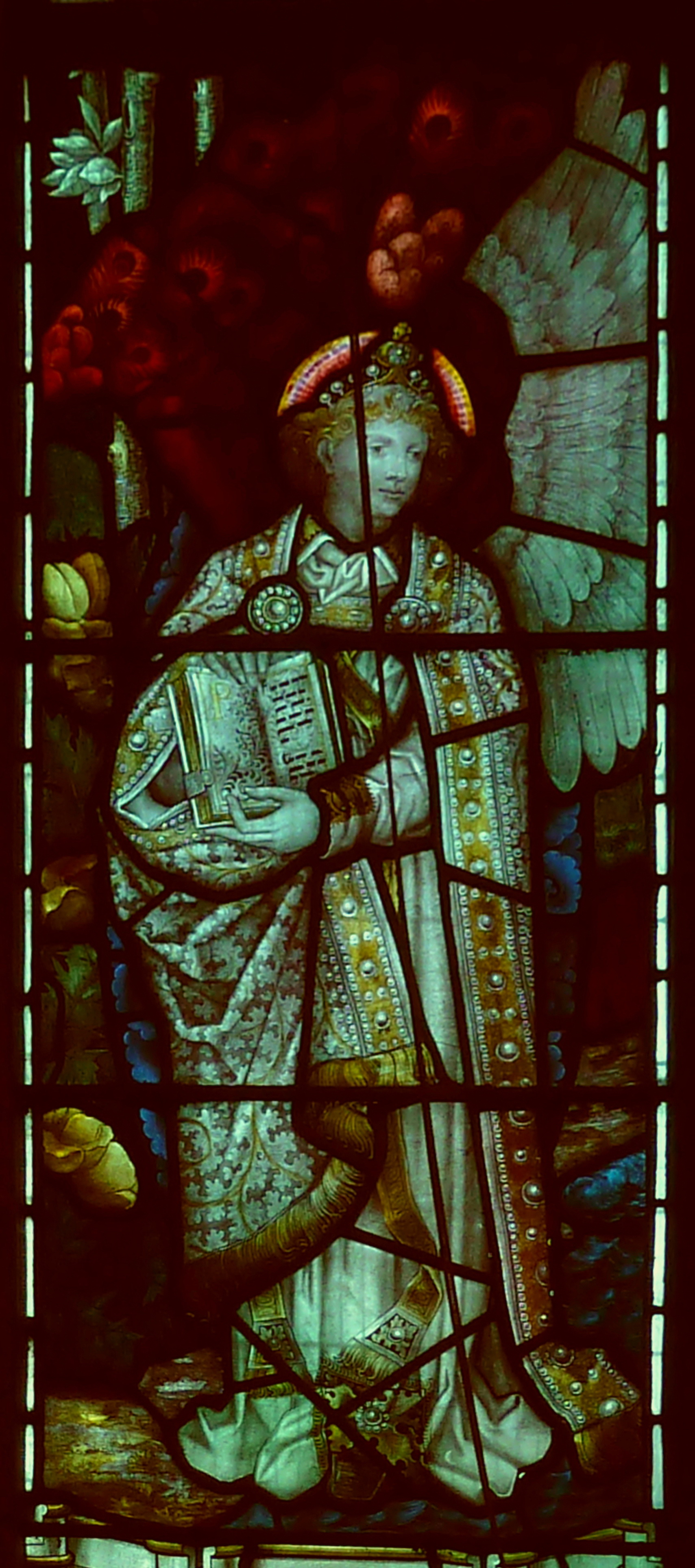
Second light of north-west window, by Charles Eamer Kempe

"The south-east window represents St John viewing the great city, holy Jerusalem, which is depicted in the distance, with the river flowing from the Throne of God, and on either side of the river is the Tree of Life. Standing opposite to St John is an angel with a golden reed with which to measure the city and the gates and the walls thereof. In the other window on the south side St John is represented as falling at the feet of the angel on the bank of the River of Life, the tree being in the midst. He is in the attitude of prayer, but the angel with the uplifted hand is repelling any worship or reverence to himself . . . Each window has two lights and on the north side each light has a separate subject. The first light of the north-west window portrays the angel with his right foot on the sea and the left on the earth. In his hand is a little book containing the message he was about to deliver. The second light depicts the angel with the key of the Bottomless Pit in one hand and a great chain in the other. Laid at his feet is the Dragon whom he has subdued and whom he is about to cast into the Bottomless Pit. The subjects of the two lights of the north-east window are borrowed from Revelations XIV.19 and XVIII.21. The first delineates the angel standing outside the city wall and with a sickle cutting a cluster of grapes to cast into the winepress of the Wrath of God. The second illustrates the angel holding in his hand the great millstone which he is about to cast into the sea . . . The first light of the centre window is an illustration of Revelations VIII.13 which describes the Apostle's vision of an angel flying through the midst of heaven, uttering a solemn proclamation of coming woes. The second light represents another angel standing before the Golden Altar upon which he is offering incense. Suspended above is a golden censer to which a long chain is attached and held by the angel."^{Pannal Parish Magazine, August 1892}

== Vicars of Beckwithshaw ==
Past clergy are listed on a memorial board at the back of the church.

=== First vicar ===
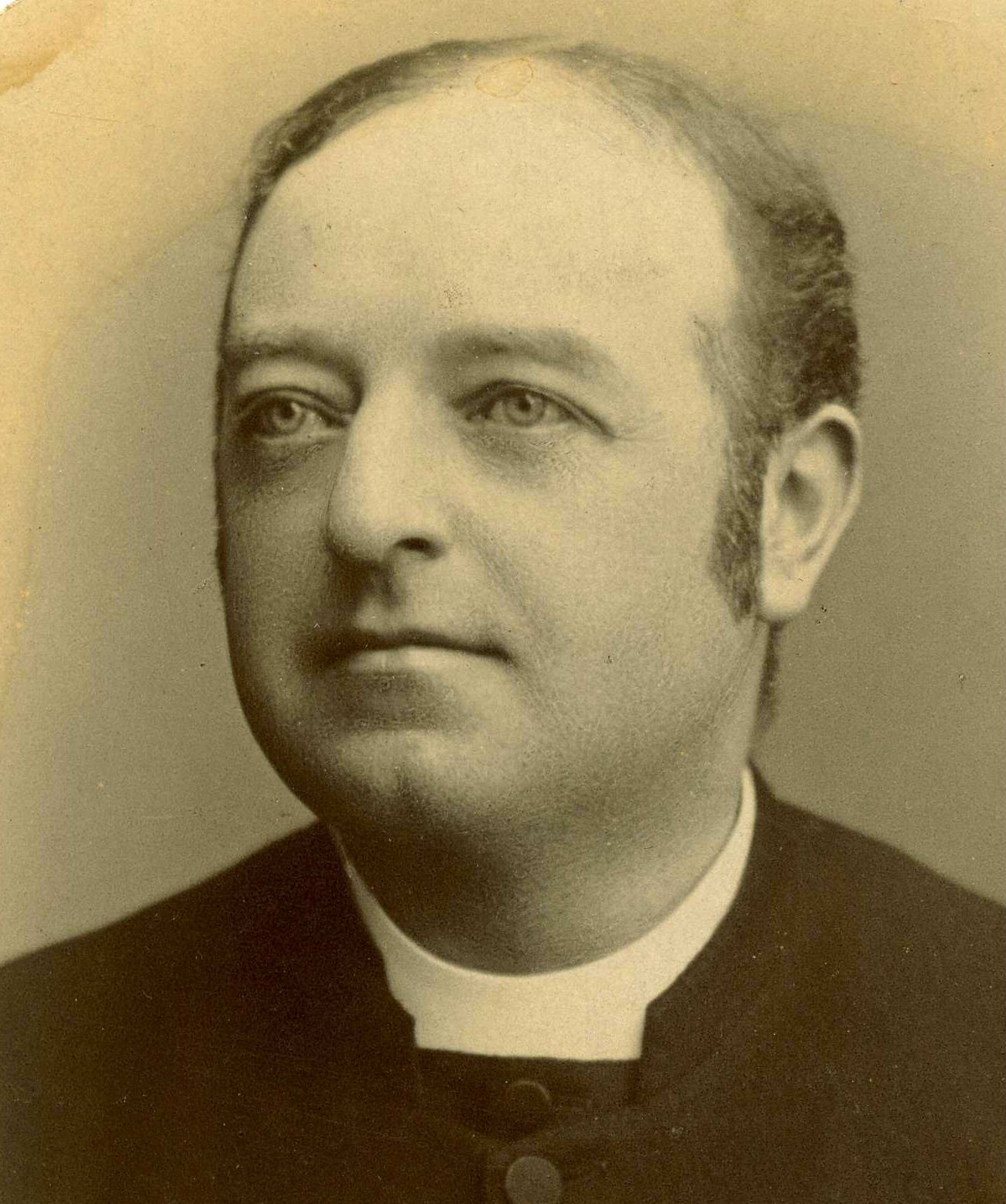
Rev Forster

The first vicar who served from 1887 to 1894 was Rev. Charles Farrar Forster (1848–1894), a man fragile of body who had suffered heart disease and excruciating pain for some years, and who had transferred his service from the busy St Andrew's in Huddersfield to this quiet parish in the hope of improving his failing health. He was said to be "a most assiduous and energetic parish worker, and . . . an able and interesting preacher." He was concerned with the welfare of the church, he was a member of the Pannal School Board, and was a fellow of the Royal Geographical Society. His funeral, interment and memorial services were well-attended by crowds of family, friends and his congregation. He is buried at Harlow Hill Cemetery, in Section A. When new, his grave would have been very noticeable; its cross, pedestal and surrounds being made of strongly-figured black and white marble. Weathering has now hidden the marble pattern, except for the unweathered section on the pedestal, where the cross has been removed by the council for safety reasons.

=== Subsequent vicars ===
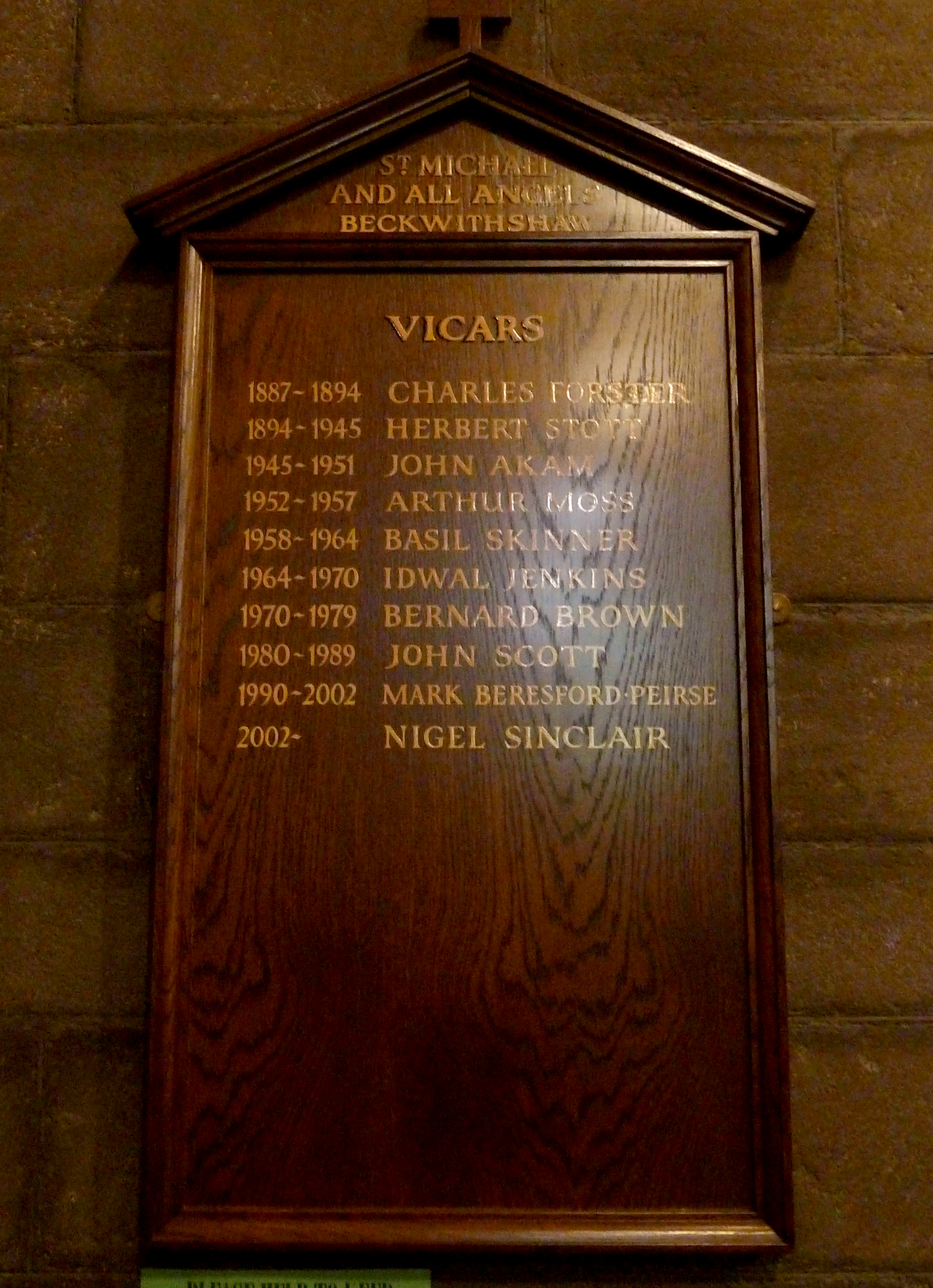
List of Vicars at Beckwithshaw Church

Rev. Herbert R. Stott followed, serving from 1894 to 1945. His wife was Mrs C.F. Stott. Their son Philip Harle Stott had a promising future, having been a prefect and head boy of St. Bees School, and an exhibitioner of Merton College, Oxford, but was killed in World War I on 25 April 1918. He was a second lieutenant of the 4th Battalion, attached to the 1st and 5th Battalions of the West Yorkshire Regiment. He is named on the Tyne Cot and Beckwithshaw memorials.

After Stott came Rev. John Akam from 1945 to 1951, and Rev. Arthur Moss from 1952 to 1958. From 1958 to 1964 it was Rev. Basil Skinner, and from 1964 to 1970, Rev. Idwal Jenkins. Rev. Bernard Brown held the post from 1970 to 1979.

=== Vicars of Pannal and Beckwithshaw ===
In 1978, John T. Scott became vicar of Pannal, and from 13 November 1980 to the end of his tenure in 1989 Pannal and Beckwithshaw shared Scott as vicar in a joint benefice. The same arrangement has continued to the present day. Rev. Mark Beresford-Peirse was in office from 1990 to 2002. Nigel Sinclair was vicar from 2002 to 2013, followed by Rev. John Smith who was installed on 20 January 2014.

== Gallery ==
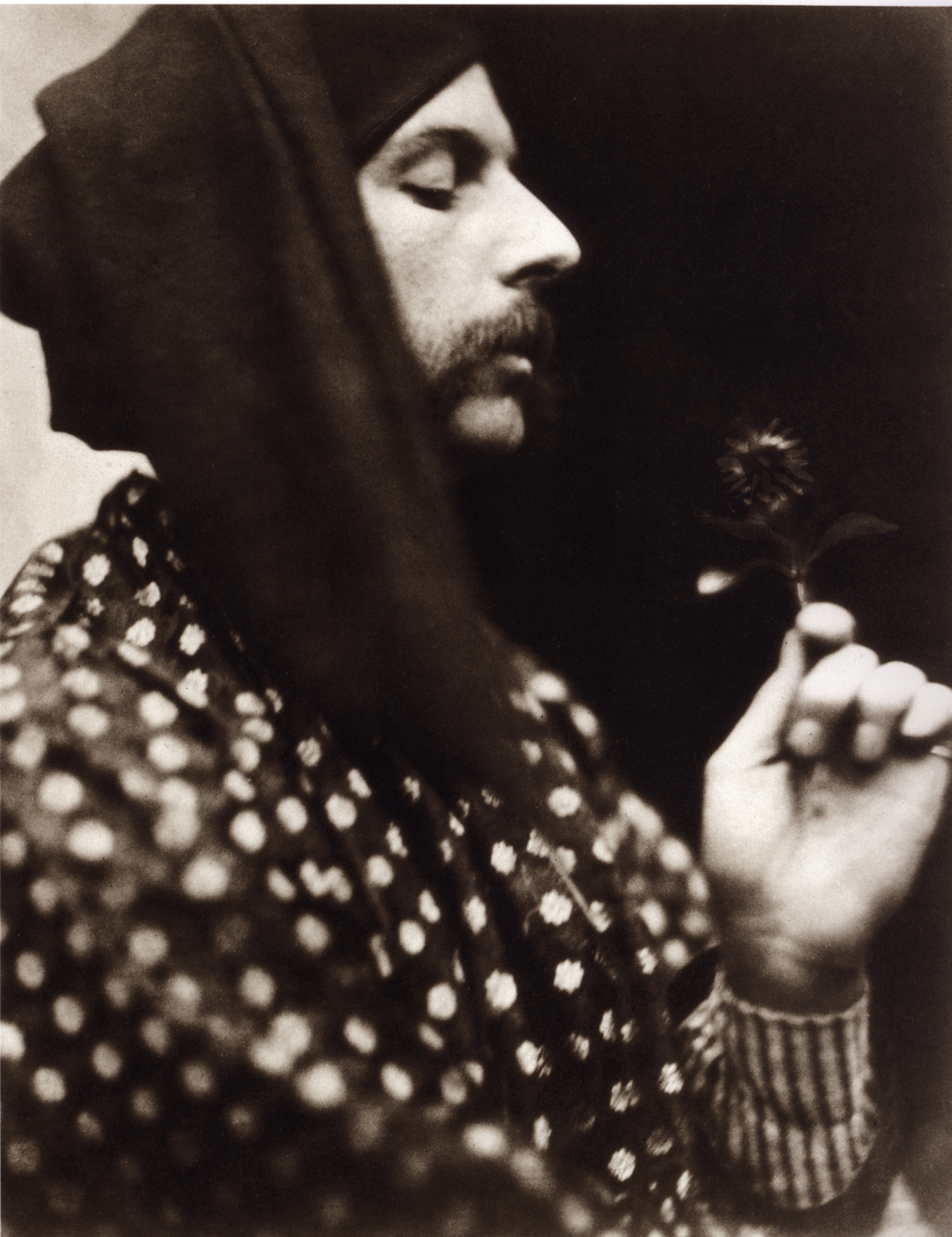
William Swinden Barber, architect

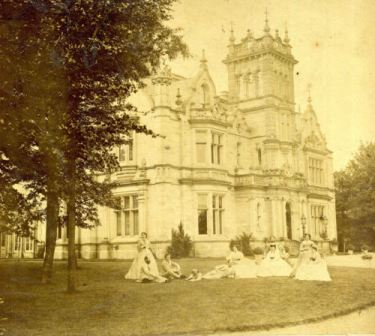
Moor Park, from 1882 home of the Williams family who funded the church

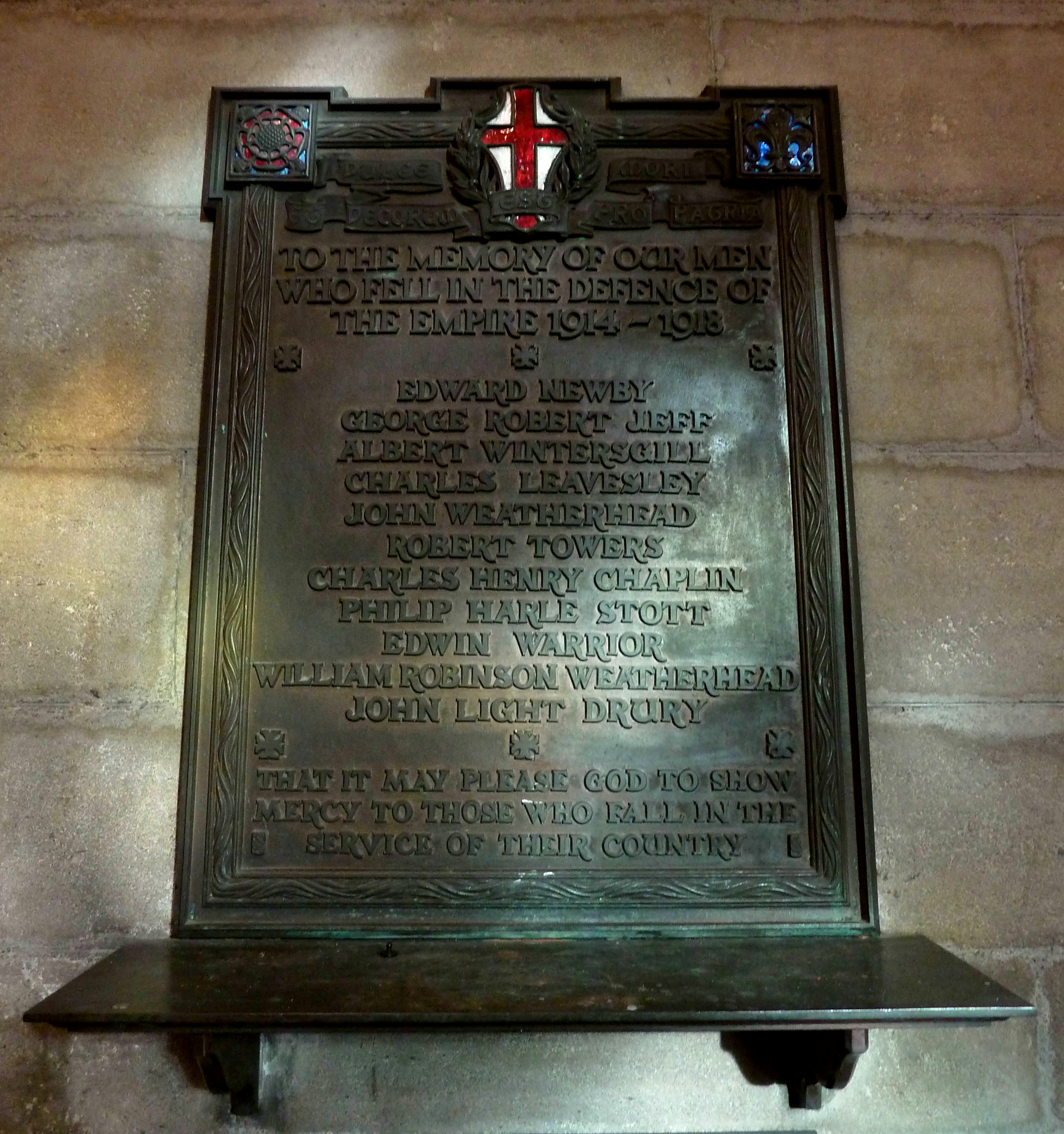
World War I war memorial in nave

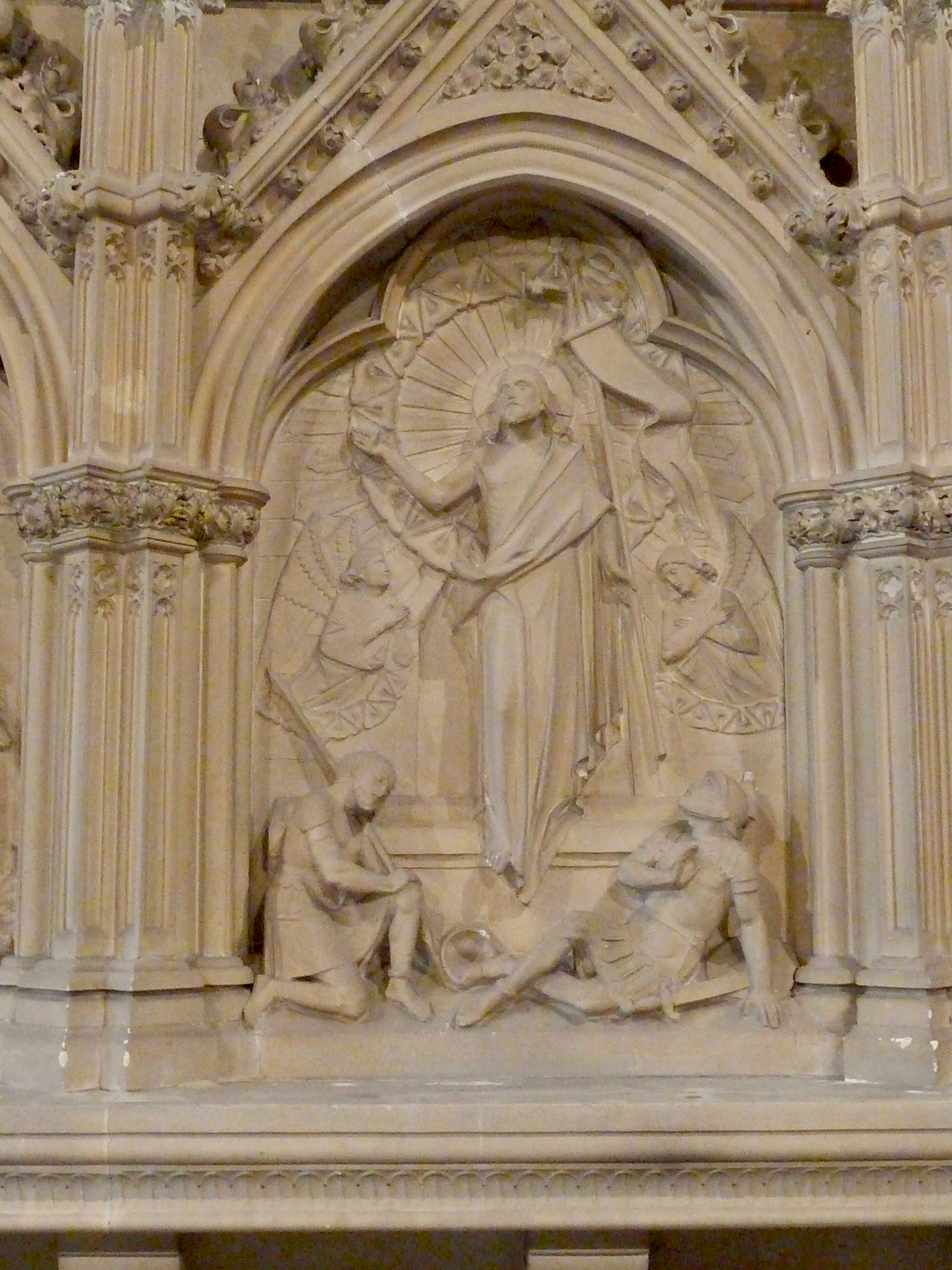
Resurrection scene from reredos, by William Pashley

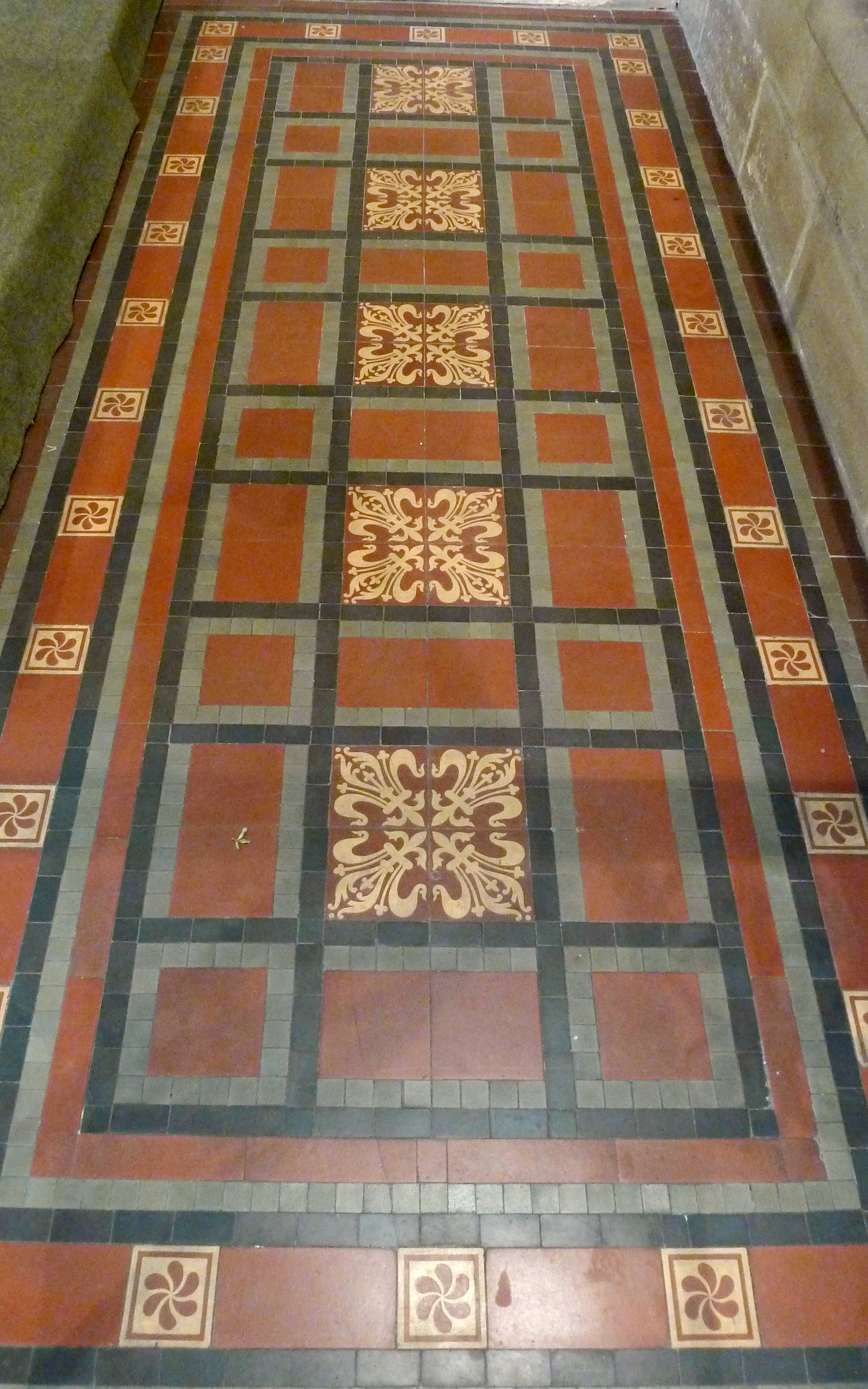
Encaustic tiles on chancel floor

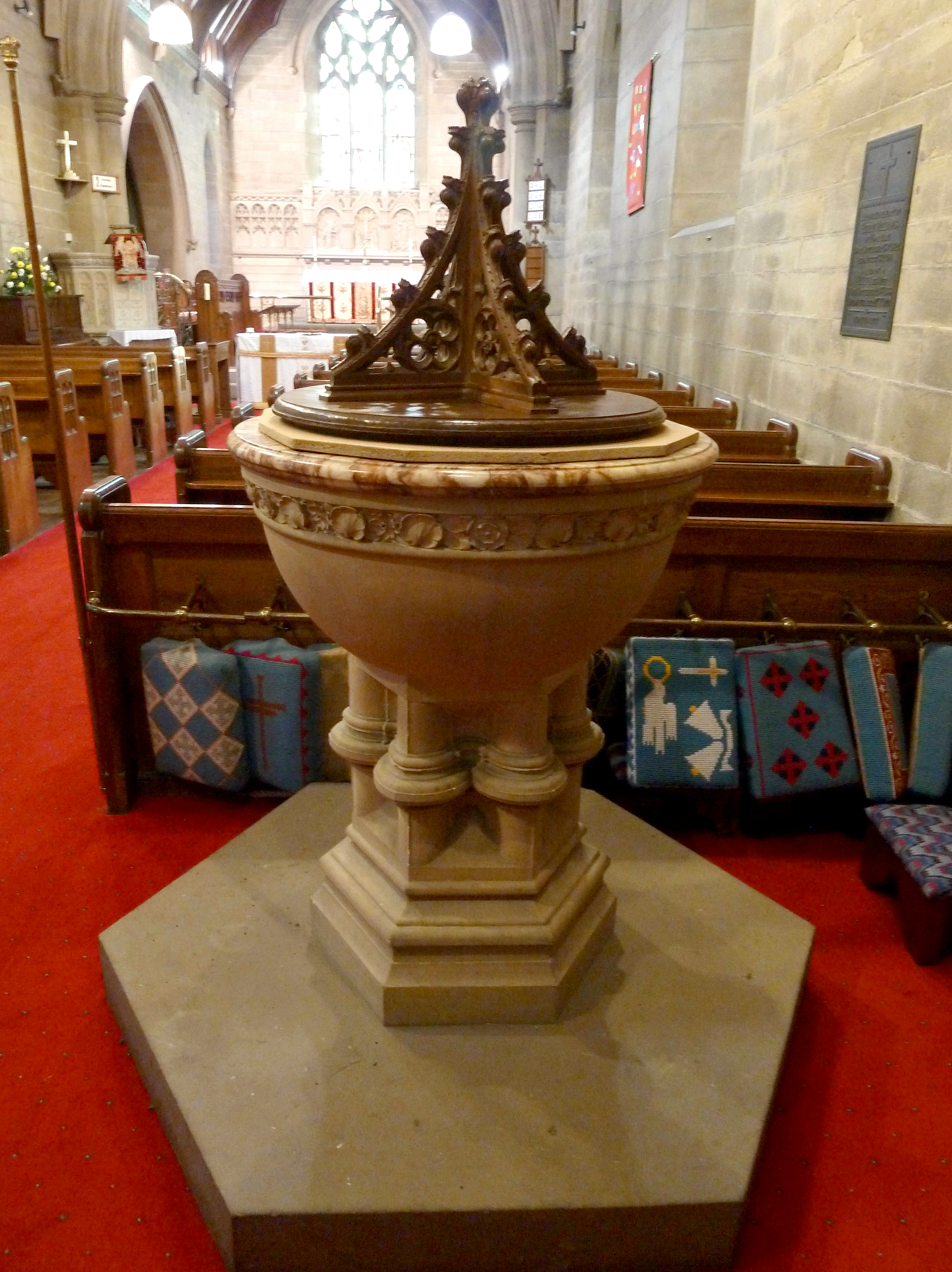
Font by William Pashley

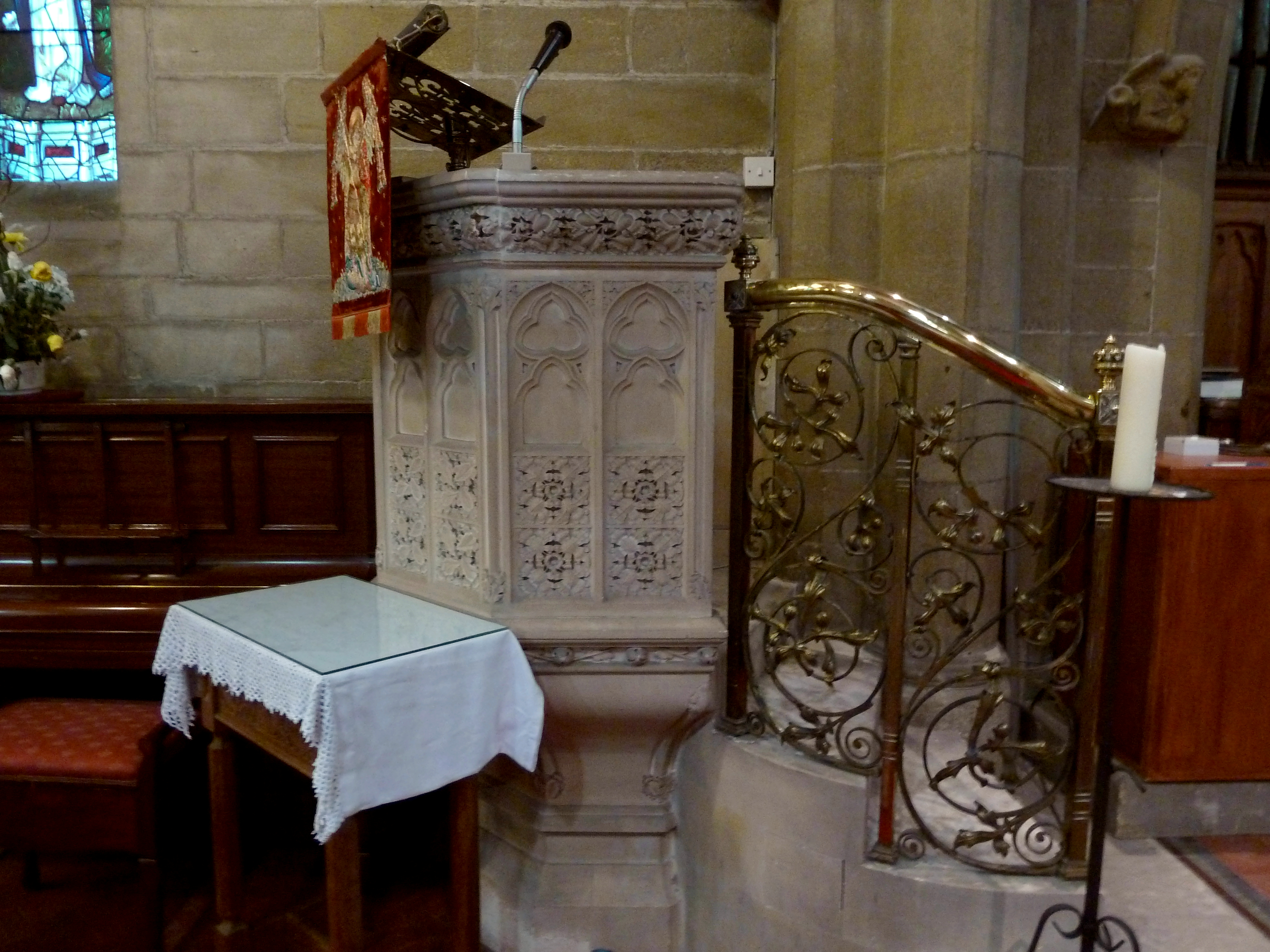
Pulpit by William Pashley

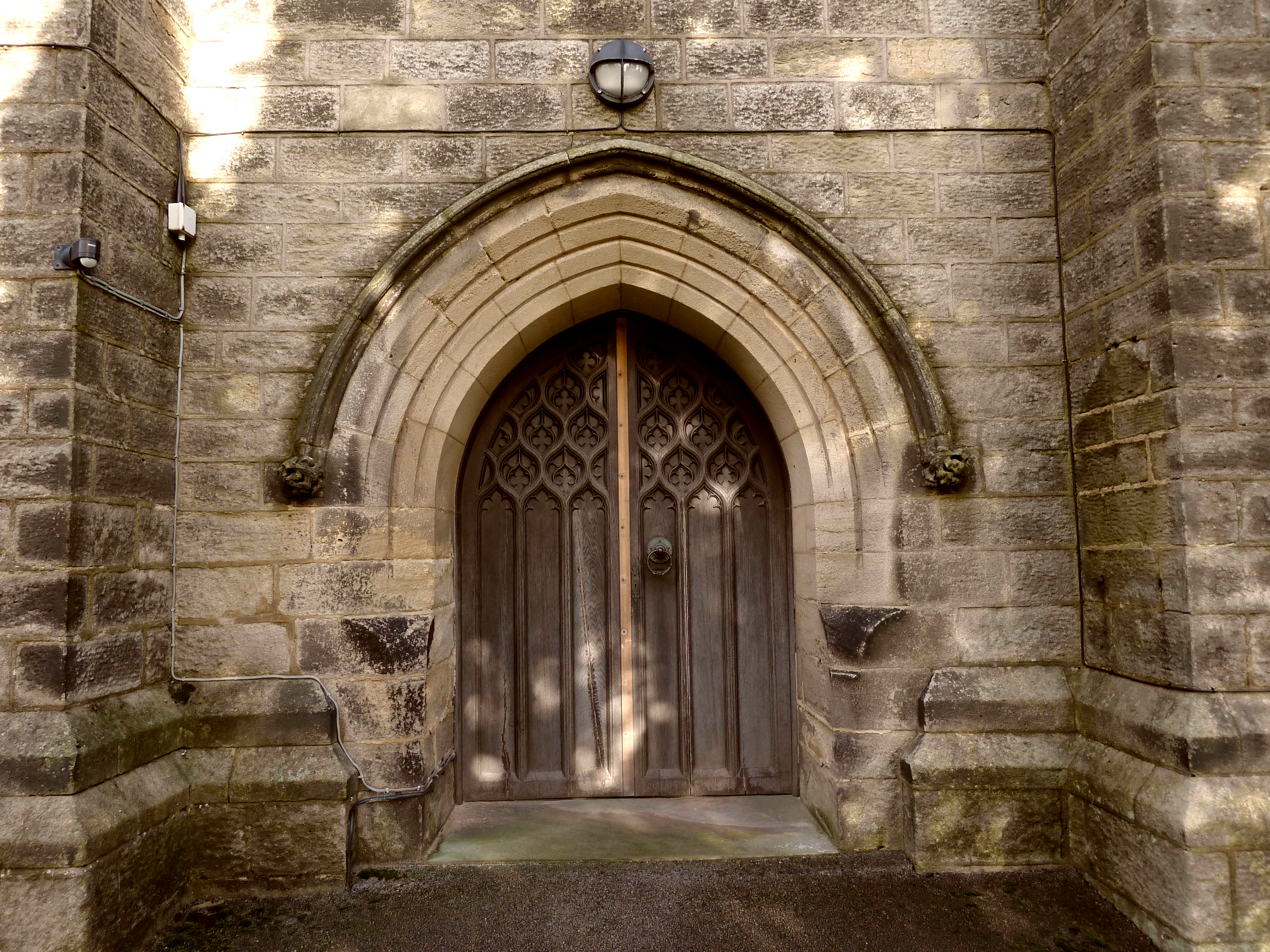
Original church door

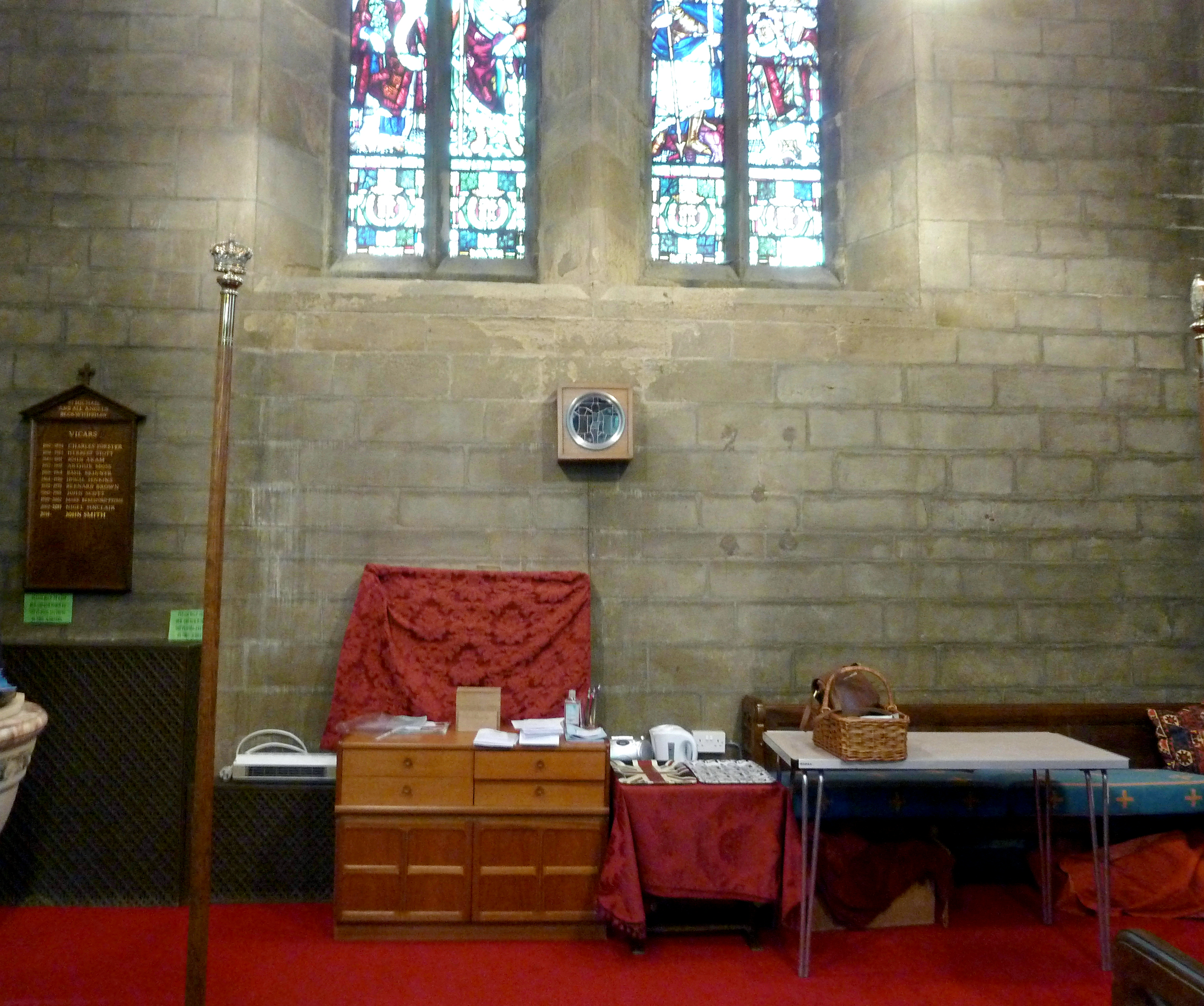
West wall of church, site of missing 1886 large stone statue of St Michael overcoming the Dragon

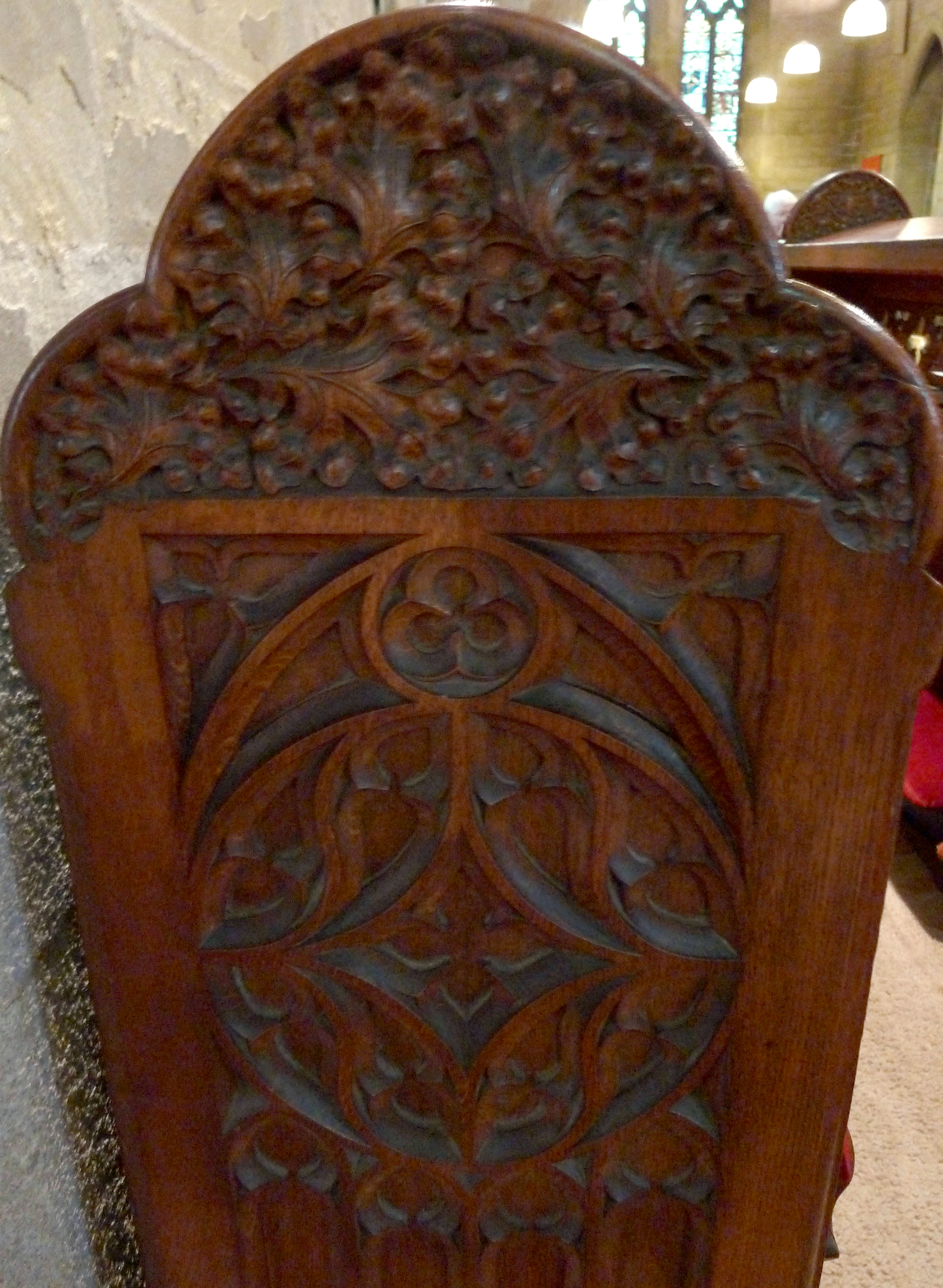
Pew end designed and commissioned by Barber

== Events ==
=== Services and regular events ===
There are four regular Sunday services per month, conducted by the vicar of both Pannal and Beckwithshaw: Rev. John Smith as of 2014. Three are morning services; one is evensong. There is a junior church for children during the morning services during school term time. There is a pram service on the 4th Thursday of each month.

== Reordering ==
In May 2018, the church officers gained planning permission to restyle the church building with a modern annexe against the north wall, containing a kitchen and toilet. The permission includes the removal of all the pews, which were designed by the architect William Swinden Barber. The ultimate destination of the pews is not known.

== See also ==
- Listed buildings in Beckwithshaw
