= Listed buildings in Beckwithshaw =

Beckwithshaw is a civil parish in the county of North Yorkshire, England. It contains twelve listed buildings that are recorded in the National Heritage List for England. All the listed buildings are designated at Grade II, the lowest of the three grades, which is applied to "buildings of national importance and special interest". The parish contains the village of Beckwithshaw and the surrounding countryside. The listed buildings consist of a country house and associated structures, smaller houses, farmhouses and farm buildings, a milepost and a church.

== Buildings ==
Name and location	Photograph	Date	Notes
Shaw Green Farmhouse; 53.96709°N 1.59040°W		1732	The farmhouse is in gritstone and has a purple slate roof with gable copings and bulbous kneelers. There are two storeys and three bays. The doorway has chamfered quoined jambs and a large initialled and dated lintel. The windows are recessed, with four lights and chamfered mullions; some mullions have been removed.
Howe House; 53.97128°N 1.57944°W		1740 (probable)	The house, which incorporates earlier material, is in gritstone, and has a stone slate roof with coped gables and bulbous kneelers. It consists of a two-storey two-bay block with a rear outshut, and a two-storey two-bay quoined block. The doorway has massive jambs and a massive lintel, and the windows are mullioned, some of them also chamfered.
Snell House Farmhouse; 53.96231°N 1.60551°W	—	Mid 18th century	A laithe house in gritstone, with quoins, and a stone slate roof with coped gables and bulbous kneelers. There are two storeys, the farmhouse has two bays, and the barn has three. The house has a doorway with tie-stone jambs, and two-light mullioned windows. The barn contains a segmental-arched cart entrance with quoined jambs and voussoirs, and a doorway with a tie-stone jamb.
Barn east of Lund House; 53.97261°N 1.56647°W	—	Mid to late 18th century	The barn is in gritstone, with quoins, a stone slate roof, and three bays. It contains opposing segmental-arched cart entrances with quoined jambs, and slit vents.
Low Buildings Barn; 53.96764°N 1.58038°W		1774	The barn is in gritstone with quoins, and a stone slate roof with coped gables and bulbous kneelers. There are seven bays, and a three-bay aisle. On the east side is a cart entrance with a dated and initialled monolithic lintel, and in the middle of the rear is a cart entrance with a cambered arch and quoined jambs. Elsewhere, there are doorways and slit vents.
Lund House; 53.97263°N 1.56682°W		Late 18th century	The house is in gritstone, with floor bands, stone gutter brackets, and a stone slate roof with shaped kneelers. There are two storeys, three bays, an added bay to the right, and a three-bay rear wing. The central doorway has tie-stone jambs, and a plain lintel and cornice. The windows are sashes with flat arches, the window above the doorway with an apron containing incised flower and star motifs. In the left gable end is a Venetian window, and there are quoins in the rear wing.
Milepost; 53.96665°N 1.60283°W		Mid 19th century	The milepost is on the east side of Otley Road (B6161 road), and is in cast iron on a gritstone support. It has a triangular plan and a semicircular head, and is about 80 centimetres (31 in) high. On the top is inscribed "DUDLEY HILL KILLINGHALL & HARROGATE ROAD" and "PANNAL", on the left side is the distance to Killinghall, and on the right side the distance to Bradford.
Church of St Michael and All Angels and associated structures 53.97373°N 1.59271°W		1859	The church, which was designed by W. Swinden Barber, is built in Killinghall sandstone and has a slate roof. It consists of a three-bay nave, a two-bay chancel with a north organ chamber and a south vestry, and a southwest tower. The tower has three stages, angle buttresses, a stair turret on the east side, string courses, gargoyle waterspouts, and an embattled parapet. It incorporates a projecting porch, in the middle stage are lancet windows, and the bell openings are pairs of trefoil-headed lancets. The churchyard is enclosed by iron railings on low stone walls, the gate piers are in carved stone, and in the churchyard is a decorative Gothic cast iron lamp-stand on an octagonal stone base.
Moor Park; 53.97451°N 1.60747°W	—	1859	A country house in gritstone that has a grey slate roof with Dutch gables. There are two storeys, fronts of five and four bays, and a recessed bay to the east. In the centre is a three-storey tower containing double doors with a fanlight, flanked by paired Ionic columns, and an entablature with an openwork balustrade, over which is an oriel window, a bracketed cornice and an openwork balustrade. The flanking bays have round-arched windows, the outer bays have mullioned and transomed windows, and there is a canted bay window to the left. On the roof is an ornate octagonal cupola with round-arched openings and an ogee roof. On the left return are two two-storey canted bay windows.
Barn, byre and pigeoncote range, Moor Park; 53.97473°N 1.60811°W	—	c. 1859	The range is in gritstone with grey slate roofs and two storeys. The barn has eleven bays and a lower two-bay range, and the pigeoncote projects at right angles. The barn has an eaves band, and a coped gable with a moulded kneeler on the left. The middle bay projects slightly under a pediment, and contains a segmental-headed cart entrance with a keystone, and elsewhere are triangular-headed doors and windows, pitching holes and vents. The pigeoncote has a moulded and modillioned eaves cornice and a pyramidal roof. It contains three round-arched openings, with a moulded impost band and keystones, and above are four tiers of eight pigeon holes with perches in a shallow arched recess.
East gate piers and railings, Moor Park; 53.97486°N 1.59313°W		c. 1859	The entrance to the drive is flanked by two pairs of square stone piers, the inner and outer piers linked by a low wall with cast iron railings. Each pier is about 3 metres (9.8 ft), it is pierced by a round-headed arch, and has a moulded cornice and a pyramidal capstone. The railings have bars with leafy spearhead finials.
Stables, Moor Park; 53.97458°N 1.60777°W	—	1859	The former stable building is in gritstone, with a floor band, a modillion eaves cornice, and a hipped grey slate roof. There are two storeys and seven bays, the middle three bays projecting under a triangular pediment. These bays contain a blind arcade with a horse's head on the ventral keystone. The bays have round-arched sash windows with fanlights, one converted into a doorway. In the centre of the roof is a clock tower with an ogee-roofed cupola.
