= Beckwith, North Yorkshire =

Hamlet in North Yorkshire, England

Coordinates: 53.972°N 1.576°W

Beckwith
- Location within North Yorkshire
- OS grid reference: SE282525
- Civil parish: Beckwithshaw
- Unitary authority: North Yorkshire
- Ceremonial county: North Yorkshire
- Region: Yorkshire and the Humber
- Country: England
- Sovereign state: United Kingdom
- Post town: HARROGATE
- Postcode district: HG3
- Police: North Yorkshire
- Fire: North Yorkshire
- Ambulance: Yorkshire

Beckwith is a small settlement in North Yorkshire, England. It lies 2 miles (3 km) south west of Harrogate.

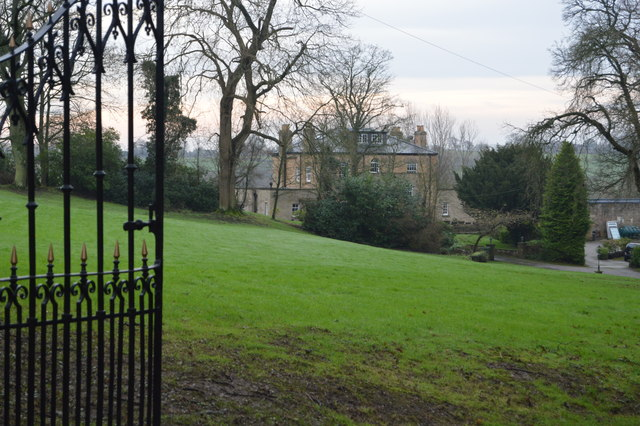
Beckwith House

The place name was first recorded in about 972 as bec wudu, Old English for "beech wood". The place was historically a hamlet in the ancient parish of Pannal in the West Riding of Yorkshire. It was the ancient seat of the Beckwith family, which owned property here until 1753. It gave its name to the now larger village of Beckwithshaw, 1 mile to the west.

From 1974 to 2023 it was part of the Borough of Harrogate. It is now administered by the unitary North Yorkshire Council. In 2010 the parish of Pannal was renamed Beckwithshaw.
