= Gu, Chabahar =

Gu گو
- Village
- Location within Iran
- Coordinates: 25°21′23″N 60°50′52″E
- Country: Iran
- Province: Sistan and Baluchestan
- County: Chabahar
- Bakhsh: Central
- Rural District: Kambel-e Soleyman

Population (2006)
  - Total: 155
- Time zone: UTC+3:30 (IRST)
  - Summer (DST): UTC+4:30 (IRDT)

Gu (Persian: گو, also Romanized as Gū; also known as Gao, Gaow, Gaū, Gāv, and Gāveh) is a village in Kambel-e Soleyman Rural District, in the Central District of Chabahar County, Sistan and Baluchestan Province, Iran. At the 2006 census, its population was 155, in 33 families.
