= Gross annual value =

The Gross Annual Value (GAV), also called just the Annual Value, of a property which is used in calculating the tax or rent which should be applied to the property.

== Details ==
In India, the Gross Annual value is the current value, the actual rent (whether received or receivable) or the fair rental value, whichever is highest or which the property might be expected to attract on the open market in ideal circumstances where there is neither a glut nor a shortage of accommodation.

The following four factors are taken into consideration while determining the GAV of a property:

1. The rent payable by the tenant (actual rent)
2. The municipal valuation of the property
3. The fair rental value (market value of a similar property in the same area)
4. The standard rent payable under the Rent Control Act

If a property is self-occupied then the GAV is considered to be nil.

In Falkirk in Scotland the Gross Annual Value is used to calculate council house rent based on factors such as house type, age, structure, number of apartments, overall floor area, location and type of heating.

The Gross Annual Value is also used in the United Kingdom as the basis for calculating Income tax from property following the replacement of property rates with the Community Charge.

It has in some cases become a more general term to refer to the annual value of an asset before expenses incurred relating to the ownership of the asset. Where the asset can be property, or something else, such as a share in a business, or other financial asset.

== History ==
Gross Annual Value is used in a number of places with tax systems which derived from the British model. Its definition came about as a result of the Poor Law.

== See also ==
- Income tax in India
