= Moir (surname) =

Moir ([MOY-er]) is a surname of Scottish origin, and is part of the Clan Gordon of the Scottish Lowlands. The name in its present form dates from the 14th century and means "brave, renowned, mighty" in Scots Gaelic. Four generations of Moirs were active members of the Burgesses & Guild Brethren of Glasgow, 1751-1846.

The earliest Moir of record was one Adam de la More. In 1213, King John of England sent Adam de la More to the King of Scotland with a gift of gyrfalcons. It looks as if he and perhaps others of his name settled in Scotland.

In the County of Rubislaw, Gilchrist More was one of the Barons who swore fidelity to Edward I in 1296. Gilcrist More is said to have incurred the wrath of Sir Walter Cumyn but later married his daughter and secured the lands of Rowallan Castle near Kilmarnock in Ayrshire. Gilcrist's granddaughter, Elizabeth Mure of Rowallan married the future King Robert II in 1346. The heiress of Polkellie, Janet More, in the time of David II married Sir Adam Muir of Rowalian.

By the end of that century, when Edward I was dealing with the Scots about the succession of the Scottish Crown, there were a considerable number of De la Mores, including an Adam de la More in Ayrshire and Lanarkshire.

A century later, when the Laird of Rowallan gets a confirmation charter from King Robert the Third, he is designated Sir Adam More, Knight; but it is in the same year (1391) that the first transmutation of the name takes place into "Mure," in a charter of pension granted to the King's uncle Andrew Mure, he being a brother of Elizabeth More of Rowallan. After this date, the common spelling of the name is Muir or Mure. Reginald (or Ranald) de la More was a Knight for Robert I of Scotland (Robert the Bruce). King Robert made de la More Chamberlain of Scotland in 1329. He held the office until his death in 1341. The Bruce gave his Chamberlain de la More considerable estates in various parts of Scotland, one being that of Abercorn in Linlithgow; another being the Thanage of Formartyn, which included a greater part of Aberdeenshire. One of the Chamberlain's sons was Sir William More of Abercorn, and another was Gilchrest More.

Robert the Bruce and Reginald de la More were Templars when in 1307 King Phillippe le Bel of France arrested and executed many Knights in Paris. Two years later the Pope excommunicated Robert the Bruce reportedly for murdering John Comyn in a Scottish church. The Pope then went on to excommunicate all of the Bruce's noblemen. Finally, the entire realm of Scotland went under papal interdict. The pope's actions left the Catholic churches of Scotland free to support the Templars. As a result, a substantial number of Knights sought refuge in Scotland. When Robert the Bruce died in 1329, having never served God on a Crusade, he left commands that his heart be taken on a Crusade.

Sir Kenneth de la More (Kenneth Moir) in the spring of 1330 rode out with Sir James Douglas carrying the Bruce's heart encased in a silver casket locket on a chain. With them went Sir Simon Locard of Lee (Lockharts of Lee), Sir William Borthwick, Sir William de Keith, Sir William de St. Clair and his younger brother John of Rosslyn (eldest brothers of Henry I Sinclair, Earl of Orkney), Sir Alan Cathcart (Clan Cathcart) and the brothers Sir Robert Logan of Restalrig and Sir Walter Logan (Clan Logan).

Sir Kenneth stopped in Sluys, Flanders where they were joined by more Knights Templars. Alfonso XI of Castile sought assistance against the Muslims (Moors) of the kingdom of Granada led by Muhammed IV, Sultan of Granada. The Knights travelled 2,000 kilometres to Seville and offered their support to Alfonso for his Crusade to rid the Iberian Peninsula of non-Christians.

On 25 August 1330 southeast of Seville in a saddle high above the river the Knights came to Teba in Andalusia. There, three thousand of Muhammed IV's cavalry made a feigned attack on the Christian. The great body of his army took a circuitous route to fall, unexpectedly, upon the rear of Alfonso's camp. With the Christian troops otherwise engaged, the Templar Knights face overwhelming odds. Templar Knights do not retreat and Sir James gave the order to charge. Sir James Douglass, Sir William St. Clair, Sir John de St. Clair, Sir Robert Logan and Sir Walter Logan died in battle.

Sir Kenneth survived to oversee preparations for transport home of the fallen Templar Knights. This included the scrubbing clean of bones. He returned the Scottish Knights to their family homes. For his extraordinary bravery and for might when faced with overwhelming odds, Sir Kenneth was named Moir. Sir Simon Locard for returning the heart of the Bruce to Melrose Abbey was named Lockhart.

Several Scottish- mainly Aberdeenshire-based- individuals of the name have been granted arms, common to all these being three detached Moors' heads dripping blood. This shared heraldic device indicates, notwithstanding a lack of established pedigree, recognition of the Moir family's crusading tradition.

Alternate spellings of the name Moir include More, Moire and de la More. The names Moore, Moores and Mooers are related.

== Notable people named Moir ==
- Alan Moir (born 1945), New Zealand-born Australian caricaturist and cartoonist
- Alexander Moir, Scottish Australian settler
- Alex Moir (1919–2000), New Zealand cricketer
- Alfred Moir (1924-2010), American art historian
- Andrew Moir (disambiguation)
- Bob Moir (1929–2016), Canadian television producer, sports commentator, and journalist
- Charles Moir (c. 1930–2019), American college basketball coach
- Dallas Moir (born 1957), Maltese-born Scottish cricketer
- Danny Moir, Canadian figure skater
- David Macbeth Moir (1798–1851), Scottish physician and writer
- Elizabeth Moir, British educationalist
- Ellen Moir, American educator
- Ernest Moir, British civil engineer
- Ian Moir, Australian rugby league player
- Ian Moir (footballer), Scottish footballer
- James Moir, BBC executive
- Jan Moir, columnist for a British newspaper
- Jim Moir, real name of comedian Vic Reeves
- Jimmy Moir, Scottish footballer
- John Moir (disambiguation), multiple people
- Joseph Moir (c. 1809–1874), Tasmanian businessman and builder
- Margaret, Lady Moir (Margaret Moir)(1864-1942), Scottish engineer
- Margaret Moir, New Zealand politician
- May A. Moir (1907–2001) American floral designer, orchid breeder, botanical collector, and horticulturalist
- Monte Moir, American musician
- Peter Moir, Australian rugby footballer
- Richard Moir (born 1950), Australian actor
- Scott Moir (born 1987), Canadian figure skater and Olympic gold medalist
- Sheri Moir (born 1981), Canadian figure skater
- William Moir (1602–1674), Scottish mathematician
- William Church Moir (1822–1896), Canadian baker and businessman
- William Whitmore Goodale Moir (1896–1985) American botanist
- Willie Moir, Scottish footballer

== See also ==
- Bronwyn Moir, a fictional character and villain in the 2019 comic series Chrononauts: Futureshock
- Moyer
- The Moir Sisters
- Moir Gardens
- Moir Baronets
