= Moyer =

Moyer is a surname. Notable people with the surname include:

- Alex Moyer (born 1963), American football linebacker
- Alice Curtice Moyer (1866–1937), American writer and suffragist
- Allen Moyer (born 1958), American set designer
- Andrew J. Moyer (1899–1959), American microbiologist
- Brett Moyer (born 1984), American lacrosse player
- Brian C. Moyer, Director of the U.S. Bureau of Economic Analysis (from 2014)
- Buck Moyer (Virgil A. Moyer Jr., 1920–2015), American Lutheran pastor
- C.I. Moyer (1904-1974), American state legislator
- Carrie Moyer (born 1960), American painter and writer
- Charles Moyer (1866–1929), president of the Western Federation of Miners
- David Moyer, American Anglican bishop
- Denny Moyer (1939–2010), American boxer
- Donald R. Moyer (1930–1951), United States Army soldier, posthumous Medal of Honor recipient
- Diane Moyer (born 1958), American field hockey player
- Ed Moyer (1885–1962), American baseball player
- Ellen Moyer (born 1936), American politician, mayor of Annapolis, Maryland (2001–2009)
- Fred Moyer (1887–1951), Canadian politician
- Frederick Moyer (born 1957), American pianist
- George McMichael Moyer (born 1988), American YouTuber
- Harvey A. Moyer (1853–1935), American businessman
- J. Keith Moyer, American newspaper publisher, editor, and journalist
- Jack Moyer (1929–2004), American marine biologist
- Jamie Moyer (born 1962), Major League Baseball pitcher
- Jay R. Moyer (1947–2018), member of the Pennsylvania House of Representatives (2007–2008)
- John Moyer (disambiguation), several people
- Justin Moyer (born 1977), American musician
- Kate Moyer (born 2008), Canadian actress
- Ken Moyer (born 1966), American football player
- Kermit Moyer (born 1943), American author
- Lauren Moyer (born 1995), American field hockey player
- Lydia Moyer, American contemporary artist
- Lee Moyer, American painter, illustrator, graphic designer
- Melinda Wenner Moyer, American science journalist
- Mike Moyer (born 1971), American author and professor
- Maurice Moyer (1918–2012), American Presbyterian minister and civil rights activist
- Paul Moyer (born 1941), television broadcaster
- Raymond Moyer (disambiguation), several people
- Roger Moyer (1934–2015), American politician, mayor of Annapolis, Maryland (1965–1973)
- Sam Moyer (born 1983), American artist
- Samuel Moyer (c. 1609 – 1683), English merchant and politician
- Samuel L. Moyer (1879–1951), American football coach
- Shea Moyer (born 1998), American soccer player
- Stephen Moyer (born 1969), British actor
- Tawny Moyer (born 1957), American actress
- Thomas J. Moyer (1939–2010), American jurist, chief justice of the Ohio Supreme Court (1987–2010)
- Tom Moyer (1919–2014), American boxer, movie theater chain magnate, real estate developer, and philanthropist
- William Moyer, American author and activist

== See also ==
- Moyer Township, Minnesota
- Moir (surname)
- Moyers (disambiguation) § People with the surname Moyers
