= Clan Logan =

Scottish clan

- Loganach
- Motto: Hoc majorum virtus (Latin: "This is valour of my ancestors").
- Slogan: Druim-nan-deur (translation from Scottish Gaelic: "The ridge of tears").
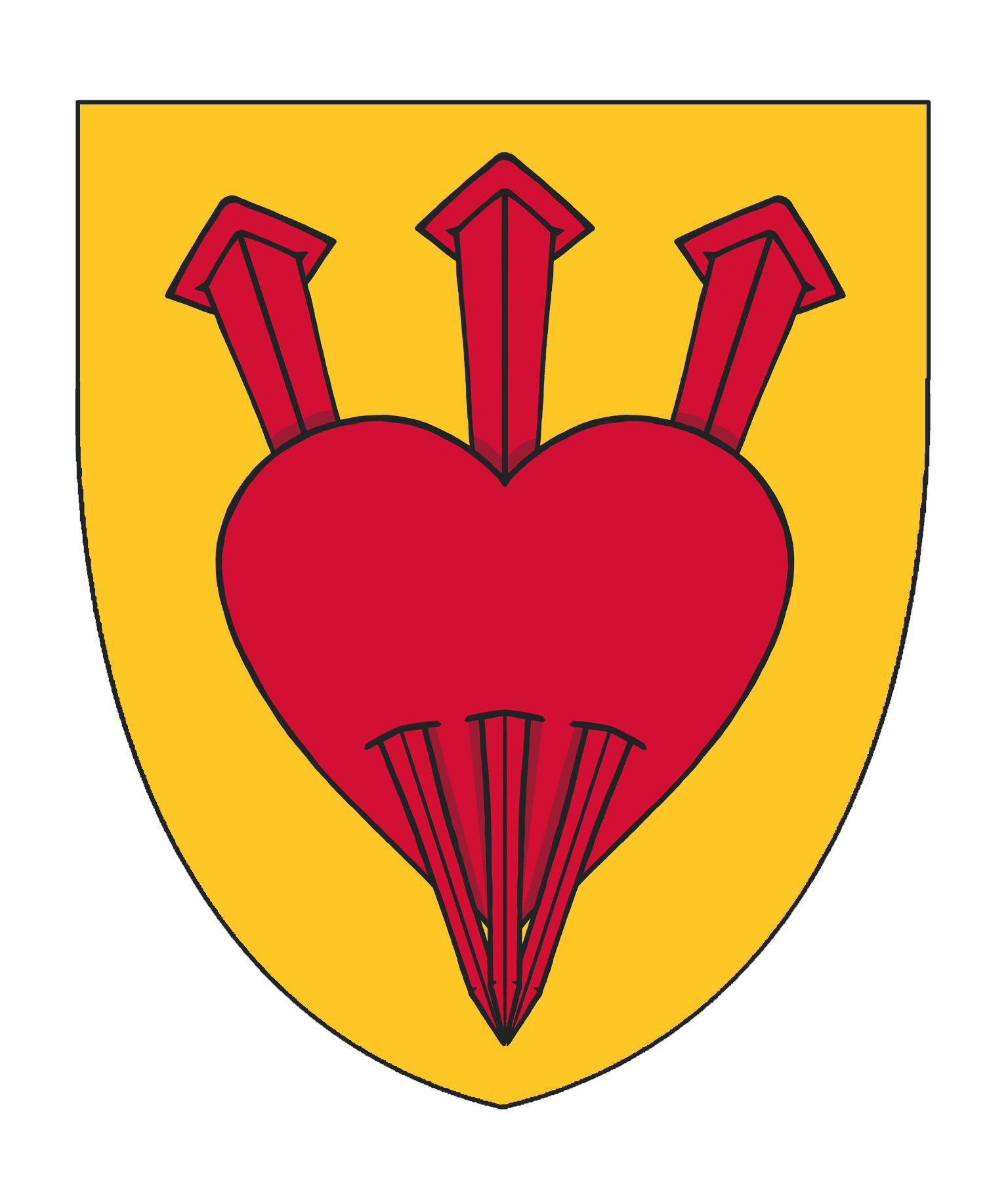
- Clan Logan no longer has a chief, and is an armigerous clan
Rival clans
Clan Mackenzie
Clan Macrae
Clan Fraser of Lovat

Clan Logan is an ancient Scottish clan with branches originating in the Highlands and Lowlands of Scotland. From the Highlands came the Logan or Loban clan. The Lowlands, however, included the Logans of that Ilk (the Chiefly line); the Barons of Restalrig, the Logans from Ayrshire, the Lobbans from Banff, and many others. The clan currently does not have a chief recognized by Lord Lyon King of Arms, but is actively searching for one. The family will hold a convention in April 2025 to select a Commander of the Logan Family to continue the search for a chief.

== History ==
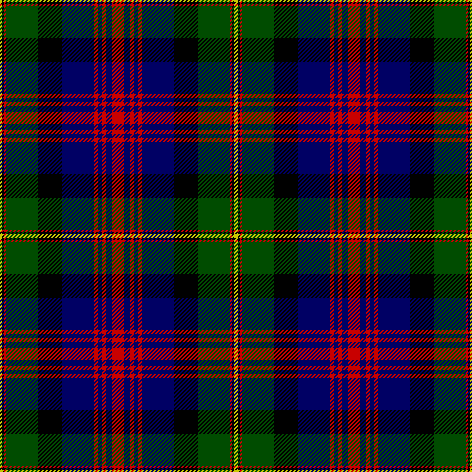
The Logan and MacLennan tartan first published by James Logan in 1831

The surname Logan likely comes from the Scottish Gaelic word lagan or laggan, the diminutive form of the Gaelic word for hollow, lag. Thus, the name refers to a low-lying place such as a valley or glen. When and where the name emerged is unknown.

It is likewise unknown who first used the Logan surname. The first one documented was Adam of Logan, who was a witness to a charter by King Alexander II (reign 1214-1249) on the 25th of August 1236.

In 1296, six Logans paid homage to Edward I of England within the Ragman Rolls of 1296. They were Andreu de Logyn (from Wigtonshire), Phelipp de Logyn (burgess from Montrose), Thurbrandus de Logyn (from Dumfriesshire), Walterus Logan, and Wautier Logan (from Lanarkshire). In addition to appearing on the Ragman Rolls of 1296, Wautier Logan's arms were described as: blazoned a stag's head cabossed, between the antlers, a shield with three piles. There is speculation that he may have been an early Lowland Chief of Name and Arms.

The Lowland Logan family divided into two main branches, Grugar, (later Restalrig) and the Ayrshire Logans who include George Logan of that Ilk (~1635 - aft. 1701) being the first to register arms at the Court of the Lord Lyon.

The Logan DNA project, managed by pre-1800 Logans, has built a Y-DNA descent tree identifying origins in Ayrshire, the Highlands, Ireland, England, Northeast Lowlands by Banff. There are still a few Y-DNA clusters that need to be identified.

=== Ancient Logans of renown ===
From 1200 to 1500, there are records of Logan landholders in the Southwest Lowlands from Ayrshire to Edinburgh. A few notable Logans include:

- Walter Logan, Lord of Hartside and Sheriff of Lanark
- Sir Walter and Sir Robert Logan - Early in the spring of 1330 they accompanied Sir James Douglas in his quest to take the heart of King Robert I of Scotland to the Holy Land. Douglas and his company had joined Alfonso XI of Castile, who was campaigning against the Moors, in the Kingdom of Granada. Alfonso's army laid siege to the castle of Teba. During the fighting Sir James Douglas and most of his men were killed. According to the poet John Barbour, Sir Robert Logan and Sir Walter Logan were among the dead.

=== Highland Logans ===
Highland Logan Clan members are reported to be buried in Kilmuir Kirkyard, though the headstones are faded and difficult to impossible to read. It is believed that they lived in and around Drumdeurfit, in the Black Isle in Easter Ross-shire. This branch is steeped in mystery with three oral traditions as follows:

1. A clan conflict took place on the Black Isle in the late 1300s when the MacLennans invaded the eastern part of Ross-shire. While camping on the ridge now called Drumderfit, the Frasiers of Inverness counterattacked and all the MacLennans were killed except one who hid under a cart or a "Lopan". His descendants occupied the farm of Druim-a-deur (Drumderfit). From this derived the name Loban which over time modernized into Logan.
2. The second story is much the same as the one above, but the invader was Gilliegorm, Chief of the Logan Clan. They were defeated, and the MacLennans emerged, while a separate Logan line remained that eventually farmed in Drumderfit.
3. The line of Logan Chiefs ended in an heiress who married Eachan Beirach and carried the Logan estates into his possession. As a result, a new head of the clan was selected who settled at Druim-na-clavan.

=== Logans of that Ilk ===
The Logans of that Ilk were the Chiefs of Name and Arms for the Logan family. They were located in the historical parish of Old Cumnock, Ayrshire. This parish occupies roughly ten by two miles of land in the valley where the Lugar and Glaisnock Waters meet. The name likely comes from the British words “Cwm” (a hollow) and “Cnoc” (a hill) or the corresponding Celtic words “Com” and “Cnoc,” thus meaning the hollow, i.e., valley, of the hill.

The first identified Chief of Name and Arms was Alexander Logan of that Ilk, who lived in the early 16th century.

In 1672, George Logan of that Ilk registered arms at the Court of the Lord Lyon. His arms are described as follows: "Mr. George Logan of that Ilk Bears Or three passion naills the twa outmost bendwayes & the midlemost paleways all meeting at the points & pearcing throug a mans heart placed in the [base} all gules: On ane helmet befitting his degree with a mantle gules doubled argent And [torse] of [his collours] is set for his cret a passion naill pearcing a heart proper The motto in ane escroll Hoc majorum virtus."

The last Chief was Hugh Logan of that Ilk, who died in 1802 without heir. Hugh was a renowned character who inspired a book titled "The Laird of Logan, 'Anecdotes and Tales illustrative of the Wit and Humour of Scotland'".

=== Logans of Restalrig ===
The leading Logan family's principal seat was in Lestalrig or Restalrig, near Edinburgh. Sir Robert Logan of Restalrig married King Robert III of Scotland's sister. Some have attributed the name of Katherine to this sister, but her name remains unknown. Robert Logan received the lands of Grugar from King Robert III on the 3rd of November 1394. Later in 1400, Sir Robert was appointed Admiral of Scotland.

Sir Robert Logan was one of the hostages given in 1424 to free James I of Scotland from being held in England. Robert's son or grandson, John Logan of Restalrig, was made principal sheriff of Edinburgh by James II of Scotland.

In 1555, Logan of Restalrig sold the superiority of Leith (the principal seaport of Edinburgh) to the queen regent Mary of Lorraine, also known as Marie de Guise.

The last Sir Robert Logan, Seventh and Last Baron of Restalric, Baron of Grugar, Baron of Fast Castle, Baron of Hutton, Lord of the Manor of Gunsgreen, son of Lady Agnes Gray, born in 1555 and died on 28 Jan 1607. He was a wealthy man and left his children a large estate. Robert Logan of Restalrig was described by contemporaries as "ane godless, drunkin, and deboshit man". Sir Walter Scott described him as "one of the darkest characters of that dark age". Sir Robert Logan did not pass away without controversy, as he was put on trial for the Gowrie Conspiracy against King James VI in 1609, 3 years after his death, as Scottish Law required his body to be in the courtroom. The verdict was that King James VI was the injured party, and Logan's children were forfeited, outlawed, and ruined, with his large estate going to the King.

=== Clan Logan Society International ===
The original Clan Logan Society was founded in 1913 by Thomas Logan, Esq., Provost of Partick, in Glasgow. Two successful Clan Logan Gatherings were held in Glasgow in 1913 and 1914. But with the advent of World War I, Clan Gatherings were placed in abeyance. Many clansmen laid down their lives for king and country during this war, and so the original Society disbanded.

The new Clan Logan Society International was established in 2002 under the leadership of Vernon E. Logan of North Carolina, USA, to carry on the efforts of the original Society. Vernon led this reformation of the Society nobly and with a passion for a successful future of Clan Logan.

In 2018, following the unexpected death of Vernon, James C. Logan was confirmed as the second President of the Society by the Board of Directors in accordance with the Society's bylaws. Under James' leadership, the Society experienced exponential growth in membership and now includes members from Scotland to the USA, to Guam, New Zealand, and Australia. The Society also maintains a close affiliation with the Clan Logan Society of Canada, with its Commissioner, Steven Logan, serving on the Society’s Board of Directors for nearly a decade.

=== The Chief Restoration Project ===
Clan Logan has been without a Chief of Name and Arms since 1802. The last chief was Hugh Logan of that Ilk who died before 29 April 1802, without an heir. After exhausting all resources to locate a rightful heir, the clan members have elected Kevin Logan as Commander of the Logan name. This was completed at a Family Convention in Edinburgh Scotland. In April 2025 the convention was supervised by the Court of the Lord Lyon King of Arms. The role of the Commander of Clan Logan is to find a living heir to hold the title of Chief of the Name and Arms of Logan.

== Shared tartans ==
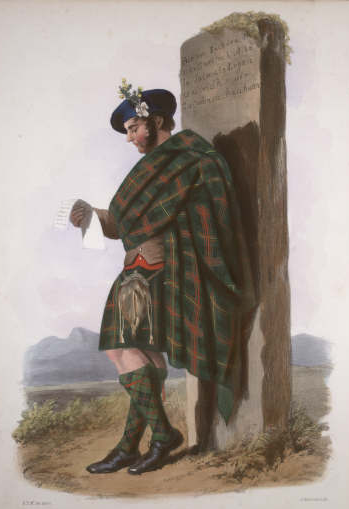
"Logan". A Victorian era romanticised depiction of a member of the clan by R. R. McIan from The Clans of the Scottish Highlands, published in 1845.

Today, both clans Logan and MacLennan share the same tartan. This tartan was first recorded in 1831 by the historian James Logan, in his book The Scottish Gaël. Later in 1845, The Clans of the Scottish Highlands was published, consisting of text by Logan, accompanied by illustrations by R. R. McIan. This work was the first to show that the MacLennans shared the same tartan as the Logans. The text on the history of Clan Logan pointed to an ancient link between the Logans and MacLennans. The plate for MacLennan shows a man from this clan wearing the Logan tartan, but no name is given to it, unlike every other clan tartan shown. Given the style of writing at the time and subtleties used by both the artist and writer, this is not a surprise and allows them to pay homage to the story of the origin of MacLennan. Until the early nineteenth century, tartan patterns were probably based on locally available dyes, rather than being specific to surnames.

== Clan symbols ==
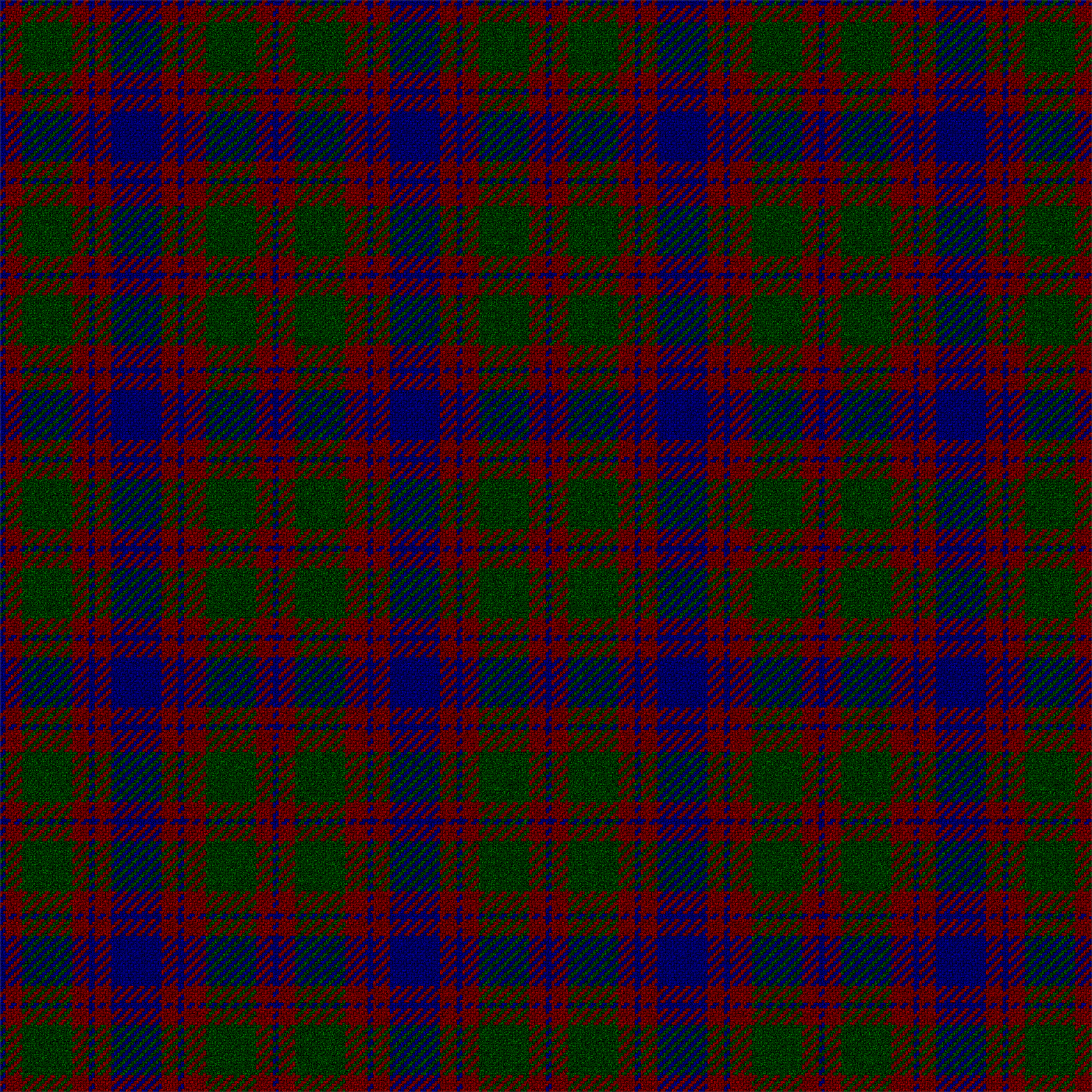
An early tartan associated with the names Logan, Skene and Rose.

Today, Scottish clans use crest badges, clan badges (plant badges), and tartan as symbols to represent themselves. The crest badge suitable for members of Clan Logan contains the heraldic crest of a passion nail piercing a human heart, Proper; and the heraldic motto HOC MAJORUM VIRTUS, which translates from Latin as "this is valour of my ancestors". The plant badge (clan badge) associated with Clan Logan is furze (gorse). According to Robert Bain, the slogan of Clan Logan is Druim-nan-deur (translation from Scottish Gaelic: "the ridge of tears").

The tartan most commonly associated with the surname Logan is identical to that of Clan MacLennan. The sett was first published by James Logan in The Scottish Gaël of 1831. There are, however, earlier dated tartans which are attributed to the name Logan. One such tartan is usually known as a Skene tartan, though it has sometimes been known as a Rose tartan. The official state tartan of Utah is based upon this tartan, in respect of Ephraim Logan, who is considered the first American of Scottish descent to leave a permanent mark on Utah.
