= Kenneth Moir =

Crusader and Knight Templar

- Family: Moir

Sir Kenneth Moir was a champion knight and Knights Templar who, in 1330, rode with James Douglas, Lord of Douglas and the Crusaders to Spain with the heart of Robert the Bruce to defeat the Moors who had laid siege to the fortress at Battle of Teba in Andalusia.

Sir Kenneth and Sir James Douglas rode out on Crusade with Sir Simon Locard of Lee, Sir William Keith of Galston, Sir William St. Clair and his younger brother John of Rosslyn, Sir Symon Glendonwyn, Sir Alan Cathcart and the brothers Sir Robert Logan of Restalrig and Sir Walter Logan. Locard would as a result of this Crusade became known as Lockhart. There was also a young William Borthwick.

Having been granted a promise of safe conduct from Edward III of England, the party sailed from North Berwick and made for Luys in Flanders in the spring of 1330 remaining there for 12 days and attracting more followers from all over Europe. The Knights Templar had been outlawed and ordered killed by this time. There are no written records of who joined the party of Scottish knights. There is circumstantial evidence that at least one knight from Germany joined in Flanders.

Their intention was to then sail to Cape Finisterre in the north west of Spain to visit Santiago de Compostela which had been ordained as a holy town by Pope Alexander III following the discovery of the remains of the Apostle James. A pilgrimage to Santiago captured the imagination of Christian Europe on an unprecedented scale as it was the third holiest site in Christendom and, at the height of its popularity in the 11th and 12th century, attracted over half a million pilgrims each year.

However, before they could set off for Santiago, word reached them that the King of Castile and León, Alphonso XI, in his efforts to drive the Nasrid dynasty (Moors) out of Granada had laid siege to the Castillo de las Estrellas (Castle of the Stars) at Teba which was occupied by the Saracen army of Muhammed IV, Sultan of Granada. The knights travelled 2,000 km (1,200 mi) to Seville and offered their support to Alfonso for his Crusade to rid the Iberian Peninsula of non-Christians. They marched the short distance to Teba.

On 25 August 1330, south east of Seville in a saddle high above the river, the knights came to Teba in al-Andalus. There, 3,000 of Muhammed IV's cavalry made a feigned attack on the Christians. The great body of his army took a circuitous route to fall, unexpectedly, upon the rear of Alfonso's camp. With the Christian troops otherwise engaged, the Templar Knights faced overwhelming odds. Templar Knights did not retreat and Sir James gave the order to charge. Sir James Douglas, Sir William St. Clair, Sir John de St. Clair, Sir Robert Logan and Sir Walter Logan died in battle. To be a Templar Knight requires giving up family name in devotion to Christ. These Scottish knights followed the practice of Sir Kenneth. Instead, of going into battle with the family coat of arms, the knights, like Sir Kenneth, were marked by crosses and stars. After the battle, families would buy back the captured knights. Unfortunately for the fallen knights, the Moors would have preferred to gain wealth by returning captured knights. Lochard did take a Moorish knight captive and was given a jewel that would become known as the Lockhardt penny for the release of the Moorish knight back to his family.

In Teba's Plaza de Espana stands a block of Scottish granite to commemorate this town's illustrious connection with Robert the Bruce where the Scottish knights gave their lives to recover the plain below the castle for Christian Spain.

Sir Kenneth survived to oversee preparations for transport home of the fallen Templar Knights. This included the scrubbing clean of bones. He returned the Scottish knights to their family homes. For his bravery and might when faced with overwhelming odds, Sir Kenneth's surname was forever changed from de la More to Moir, from the Scottish Gaelic for brave and mighty one.

The earliest Moir armorial bearing, the family crest of the Moirs, depicts a shield beset with laurels under a knight's helmet. Larger than the helmet above is a skull scrubbed clean with two leg bones saltire proper in a cross to represent the fallen knight. The two bones form the cross of Saint Andrew's, a saint martyred on a tipped cross, "a mort head upon two leg bones saltyre ways proper." Below the knight's helmet are three Moor heads in their gore cut proper with blood dripping arranged in a perfect triangle. To draw away attention from the triangular symmetry and to the answer the question "Why three?", over the centuries arose the saying: "One Christian Moir slew three pagan Moors."

The Moor's head is one of the most mysterious symbols in Christian heraldry. Pope Benedict XVI has placed the Moor's head in identical profile on his own coat of arms. Pope Benedict is from Germany and may have gained the heraldic symbol from a Friesland or Bavaria family descended from a Knight of the Battle of Teba. The Moir crest is not that of a triumphant victor. Instead the crest is grim memorial to fallen warriors, both comrade-in-arms and enemy. The family motto in the scroll on the crest is Non sibi sed cunctis: "Not for self, but for all". When setting forth the family motto, Kenneth Moir remembered the Knights Templar motto: "Not for self, but for God."
