= Vermiglio (surname) =

Vermiglio is a surname. Notable people with the surname include:

- Giuseppe Vermiglio (c. 1585–1635), Italian Baroque painter
- Pietro Martire Vermiglio (1499–1562), Italian theologian
- Valerio Vermiglio (born 1976), Italian volleyball player
