= Dean Ornish =

American physician (born 1953)

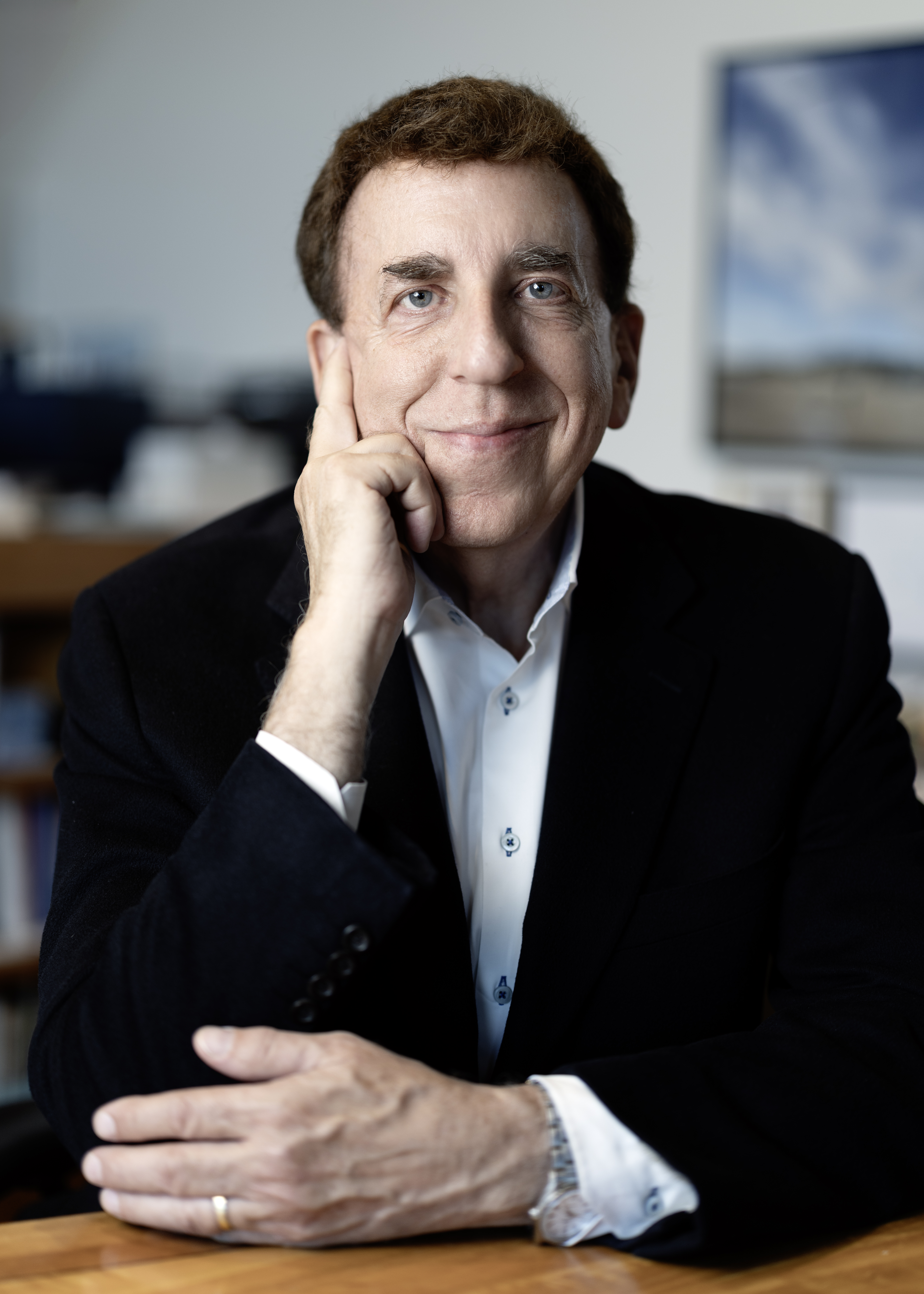
- Born: July 16, 1953 (age 73); Dallas, Texas, U.S.
- Education: University of Texas at Austin (BA); Baylor College of Medicine (MD)
- Occupations: Physician; researcher
- Years active: 1984–present
- Known for: Dr. Dean Ornish's Program for Reversing Heart Disease; Eat More, Weigh Less; The Spectrum'
- Medical career
- Profession: Medical doctor, health advocate
- Website: www.deanornish.com

Dean Michael Ornish (born July 16, 1953) is an American physician and researcher. He is the president and founder of the nonprofit Preventive Medicine Research Institute in Sausalito, California, and a clinical professor of medicine at the University of California, San Francisco. The author of Dr. Dean Ornish's Program for Reversing Heart Disease, Eat More, Weigh Less and The Spectrum, he advocates for diet and lifestyle changes he believes can treat and prevent heart disease.

== Personal life ==
Ornish was born on July 16, 1953, in Dallas, Texas. He is of Jewish heritage. After graduating from Dallas's Hillcrest High School, he studied humanities at the University of Texas at Austin, graduating in 1975 with a Bachelor of Arts, summa cum laude, as the school's valedictorian. He attended medical school at the Baylor College of Medicine, graduating in 1980 with a Doctor of Medicine degree. He completed a medical internship and residency at Massachusetts General Hospital (1981–1984), and was a Clinical Fellow in Medicine at Harvard Medical School.

== Career ==
Ornish takes a lifestyle-driven approach to the control of coronary artery disease (CAD) and other chronic diseases. He promotes lifestyle changes including a quasi whole foods, plant-based diet, smoking cessation, moderate exercise, stress management techniques including yoga and meditation, and psychosocial support. While Ornish promotes a Plant-based diet, he does not advocate for a strictly vegan diet as his program allows for the occasional consumption of other animal products.

His interest in vegetarian diets began as a college student when he first met Indian yoga guru and religious teacher Swami Satchidananda Saraswati. Satchidananda advocated a vegetarian diet for its health, ecological, and spiritual benefits. He established the first vegetarian health food store in New York City, in 1972. Satchidananda inspired Ornish's dietary research. In 1986, Ornish wrote the foreword of Satchidananda's vegetarian cookbook, The Healthy Vegetarian. Ornish's interactions with Satchidananda eventually led to decades of research beginning in the 1980s on the impact of diet and stress levels on people with heart disease. This research, published in peer-reviewed journals, became the basis of his "Program for Reversing Heart Disease". It combined diet, meditation, exercise and support groups, and in 1993 became the first non-surgical, non-pharmaceutical therapy for heart disease to qualify for insurance reimbursement. With the exception of chiropractic care, it was the first alternative medical technique, not taught in traditional medical-school curricula, to gain approval by a major insurance carrier.

Ornish worked with the Centers for Medicare and Medicaid Services for 16 years to create a new coverage category called intensive cardiac rehabilitation (ICR), which focuses on comprehensive lifestyle changes. In 2010, Medicare began to reimburse costs for Ornish's Program for Reversing Heart Disease, a 72-hour ICR for people who have had heart attacks, chest pain, heart valve repair, coronary artery bypass, heart or lung bypass, or coronary angioplasty or stenting. In addition to the Ornish program, Medicare and Medicaid pay for ICR programs created by the Pritikin Longevity Center and by the Benson-Henry Institute for Mind Body Medicine at Massachusetts General Hospital.

Ornish has been a physician consultant to former President Bill Clinton since 1993, when he was asked by Hillary Clinton to consult with the chefs at The White House, Camp David, and Air Force One. In 2010, after the former President's cardiac bypass grafts became clogged, Clinton, encouraged by Ornish, followed a mostly plant-based diet.

In 2011, Barack Obama appointed Ornish to the Advisory Group on Prevention, Health Promotion, and Integrative and Public Health.

=== Diet ===
Ornish has promoted a diet known as the "Ornish diet" to prevent and reverse heart disease. The Ornish diet is lacto-ovo vegetarian as it includes non-fat dairy products and egg whites in moderation. On the Ornish diet all meat, fish, poultry, fat dairy products, coconuts, margarine, nuts, seeds, avocados, olives, and cooking oils (apart from canola oil) are forbidden. The diet is very low in fat with 10 percent of fat from total calories and low in cholesterol. The Ornish diet emphasizes consumption of fruits, legumes, vegetables and whole grains. The diet also recommends the use of fish oil supplements. The Ornish diet is part of Ornish's Program for Reversing Heart Disease which also includes exercise, meditation, stress reduction and yoga.

The Ornish diet has been authorized as a cardiac rehabilitation program by Medicare.

Critics have stated that Ornish has not provided sufficient clinical evidence to support his claims and his studies have not been replicated. Nutritionists have described the Ornish diet as a high-carbohydrate low-fat fad diet. The Ornish diet can lower blood cholesterol but a criticism is that it restricts fish, nuts and olive oil which may protect against heart disease.

Nutritionist Fredrick J. Stare commented that the Ornish diet is too low in fat for most people to follow and it may result in deficiencies of essential fatty acids. Stare noted that although the diet has been shown to stop the progression of arterial blockage in persons with cardiac disease, the diet is unbalanced and too extreme for most people to stick with long-term. Because of the restricted nature of the Ornish diet it has a high discontinuation rate; the American Heart Association and the U.S. Department of Health have not recommended the diet.

In 2008, The Gale Encyclopedia of Diets noted potential risks of the Ornish diet:

Dr. Ornish's diet is very low in fat and limits meat and animal product intake to little or none. Many important vitamins and minerals such as zinc and vitamin B12 are acquired from these sources in a normal diet. Without these sources there is a significant possibility of deficiency. Also, because of the very low fat allowance of the diet there is some concern that people on this diet may not get enough vitamin E, which is found mainly in nuts and oil. These are too high in fat to be eaten regularly while on this diet. Dr. Ornish often recommends taking supplements while following his diet, and taking a complete multivitamin may help reduce the risk of a deficiency. Multivitamins and supplements however have their own risks, especially for pregnant or breastfeeding women and individuals with medical issues such as renal disease.

In March 2015, The New York Times published "The Myth of High-Protein Diets", an article by Ornish critical of diets high in animal fats and proteins. Science and health writer Melinda Wenner Moyer responded to Ornish in Scientific American; in it, she criticized Ornish's research and dietary recommendations, saying he used what she considered to be misleading statistics. Her article elicited a lengthy response from Ornish, who defended his position by citing a number of research studies, saying that she was mistaken regarding the statistics he had cited, and identifying serious flaws in the studies she said conflicted with his claims. In reply, Moyer wrote another article critical of Ornish's arguments, concluding: "Ornish's diet would probably be an improvement on the current American diet—if people could actually follow it long-term. But his claims about the dangers of saturated fat and red meat go beyond the science and in some cases contradict it."

== Bibliography ==
- Dr. Dean Ornish's Program for Reversing Heart Disease New York: Random House, 1990; Ballantine Books, 1992. ISBN 978-0804110389
- Eat More, Weigh Less New York: HarperCollins Publishers, 1993, ISBN 978-0060170189
- Everyday Cooking with Dr. Dean Ornish New York: HarperCollins Publishers, 1996, ISBN 978-0060173142
- Love & Survival: The Scientific Basis for the Healing Power of Intimacy New York: HarperCollins, 1998.ISBN 978-0060930202
- The Spectrum New York: Ballantine Books, 2008. ISBN 978-0345496317
- UnDo It! with Anne Ornish. New York: Ballantine Books, 2019. ISBN 9780525479970
