= Glenmuir Water =

River in Scotland

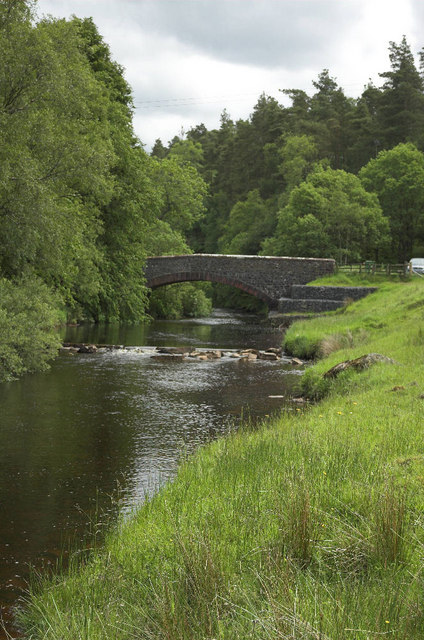
- The Water of Glenmuir at Dalblair Bridge

Location
- Country: Scotland
- Region: Ayrshire
- District: East Ayrshire
- Towns/settlements: Dalblair Lugar

Physical characteristics
- Source
  - location: Southern Uplands, East Ayrshire, Scotland
- Mouth
  - location: Lugar
  - coordinates: 55°28′02″N 4°13′06″W

Basin features
- River system: Ayr
- Tributaries
  - left: Guelt, Avisyard Burn
  - right: Duncanziemere Burn

The Glenmuir Water is a river in Ayrshire, Scotland.The river rises high in the hills south of Muirkirk. On reaching Lugar the Glenmuir is joined by the Bellow Water and is renamed the Lugar Water. Ayrshire Rivers Trust monitor water quality for the river and visit annually.

== Kyle Castle ==
At Dalblair the river passes the remains of Kyle Castle. Now a ruin, the castle dates from the 15th Century.

== The Lugar Sill ==
Where the Glenmuir Water Water joins the Bellow Water the river passes through a Site of Special Scientific Interest (SSSI) called The Lugar Sill. The Lugar Sill is a geological feature which has been closely studied over many years. One of the many igneous rocks found in the sill is Lugarite, an extremely rare rock found only at this locality.

== The Glenmuir Viaduct ==
A short distance upstream from the confluence with the Bellow Water the Glenmuir Water flows underneath the Glenmuir Viaduct. This is a now disused railway viaduct closed in 1964 which carried the Ayr to Muirkirk line. The viaduct is B listed.
