= Woodroad Viaduct =

19th century bridge in East Ayrshire, Scotland

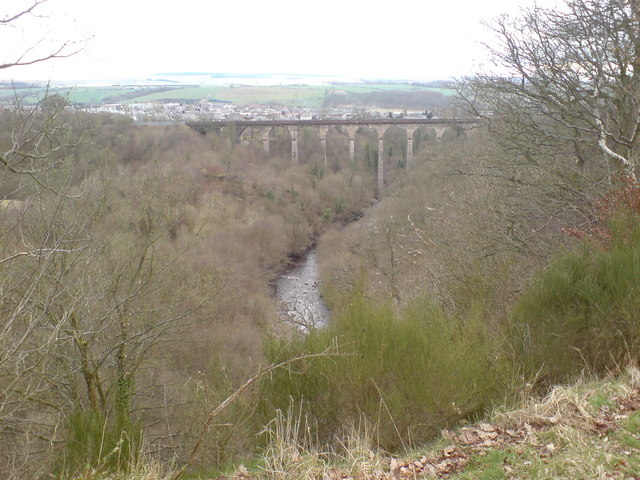
- Woodroad Viaduct in 2007
- Coordinates: 55.4586°N 4.2568°W
- Carries: Glasgow South Western Line
- Crosses: Lugar Water
- Locale: East Ayrshire

Characteristics
- Total length: 229 metres (751 ft)
- Height: 49 metres (161 ft)
- No. of spans: 14

History
- Opened: 1850

Listed Building – Category A
- Official name: Bank (or Templand) Railway Viaduct Over Lugar Water In Woodroad Park
- Designated: 13 April 1971
- Reference no.: LB24133

Location
- Interactive map of Woodroad Viaduct

The Woodroad Viaduct, also known as Bank Viaduct or Templand Viaduct, is a viaduct carrying the Glasgow South Western Line over the Lugar Water at Cumnock in East Ayrshire, Scotland. Since April 1971, it has been recognised as being a category A listed building.

The Woodroad Viaduct, which comprises 14 semi-circular arches, was designed by the civil engineer John Miller and built by the contractor James McNaughton. Construction was complicated by the presence of several coal workings in the vicinity, as well as the Lugar Water itself. It is largely composed of locally sourced white sandstone. The viaduct was completed during 1850, after which services of the Glasgow and South Western Railway (G&SWR) commenced across it. It has been claimed that Miller considered the structure to be his finest work.

Today, the viaduct is still in service and carries the Kilmarnock to Dumfries section of the main line from Glasgow to Carlisle. During the 21st century, national railway infrastructure company Network Rail formed a partnership with the Woodroad Regeneration Forum to preserve and maintain the Woodroad Viaduct for the long term; several future upgrades have been reportedly planned for the structure.

== History ==
=== Background and design ===
During the late 1840s, the Glasgow, Dumfries and Carlisle Railway company embarked on the construction of a southern extension of the Glasgow, Paisley, Kilmarnock and Ayr Railway to connect through to the border city of Carlisle. The selected route necessitated the construction of a crossing over the Lugar Water near the town of Cumnock; the task of designing this structure was assigned to the civil engineer John Miller, who had prior professional involvement in the company, in particular the surveying of the route. Millar decided upon the use of a relatively elegant ashlar masonry viaduct for this crossing.

As built, the sandstone viaduct has a length of 229 metres and reaches a peak height of 49.2 metres at one point, though the average height of the structure is 28.8 metres. Efforts were made to keep both the deck and the approaches relatively level; the northern approach has a 1 in 200 gradient, while the southern approach has a less gentle gradient of 1 in 150. It has 14 semi-circular ashlar arches, nine of them having a span of 15.24 metres and the remainder possessing a 9.1 metre span, these smaller arches being placed at the ends of the structure. The thrust pressure line is close to the centre of each arch ring; the rings of the main arches have a thickness of 610mm (one twenty-fifth of the span), resulting in a calculated horizontal pressure present upon the arch's keystone of roughly 254 tonnes.

In line with the practice of famed bridge-builder and civil engineer Thomas Telford, the viaduct features hollow piers and spandrels, which has the benefit of reducing the weight bearing on the structure's foundations. The piers located between the larger arches have a thickness of 2.1 metres at their tops, complete with a 610mm-wide central void; while the piers of the smaller arches have a thickness of 1.5 metres at the top along with a 300mm void. The smaller arches are deliberately separated from the main ones by 5 metre-thick abutments. The abutments present at either end of the whole structure, where the viaduct connects with the adjacent embankments, have a thickness of 7 metres.

=== Construction ===
During its design process, the structure had to effectively account for several important local factors. In terms of its footing, the ground was less than ideal due to the presence of not only the Lugar Water but also of considerable mining activities. Specifically, as a result of the area having been rich in both limestone and coal, it had been worked for some time by various locals, commonly using a room and pillar technique . As these workings posed a clear threat to the stability of any major structure built around them, preliminary work was undertaken to locate these cavities, after which they would be cleared of loose debris and firmly packed using dry stone. This activity proved sufficient as the viaduct's piers have not suffered from settlement.

Following the completion of this ground work, construction of the viaduct's piers commenced during 1848. This phase of work was assisted by the use of machinery in the form of derrick cranes, which were used to build both the piers and the abutments up to a maximum height of 7.6 metres above ground level. Above this height, construction activity was supported using an elevated service road, complete with travelling cranes that ran upon rails located upon either side of the viaduct. The viaduct was primarily construction of locally sourced white sandstone, which was transported to the site using a horse-drawn tramway.

During this process, a high degree of attention was dedicated to the correct erection of the timber formwork that was used to construct the masonry arches, which had a height in excess of 30 metres. The weight of a single completed arch, which possessed a span of 15.24 metres, was estimated to have exceeded 1,000 tonnes, which exerting a pressure upon the structure's foundations of 68.4 tonnes per square metre. Overall, the viaduct contained 14,150 cubic metres of masonry, which weighed 34,040 tonnes. It was constructed at a reported cost of roughly £30,000, of which the centring alone cost around £4,500.

The viaduct was completed during 1850. It has been claimed that Miller came to regard the Woodroad Viaduct as having been his greatest professional accomplishment.

=== Operational use ===
During 2010, the local Woodroad Regeneration Forum and national railway infrastructure company Network Rail embarked upon a joint effort aimed at safeguarding the Woodroad Viaduct and ensuring its long term future. In line with this effort, future work to both restore and upgrade the structure has been planned. On 25 September 2010, Cathy Jamieson, MP and MSP, unveiled a commemorative plaque to mark the passing of 160 years since the construction of the viaduct.

== See also ==
- Glaisnock Viaduct, also in Cumnock
- List of bridges in Scotland
