= Moyers =

Moyers may refer to:

== Places ==
- Moyers, Oklahoma
- Moyers, West Virginia

== People with the surname ==
- Bill Moyers (1934–2025), American journalist and public commentator
- Edward L. Moyers (1928–2006), American railroad executive
- Robert Moyers (1919–1996), American orthodontist
- Steve Moyers (born 1956), American soccer forward

== See also ==
- Moyer, surname
