= Giuseppe Vermiglio =

Italian painter

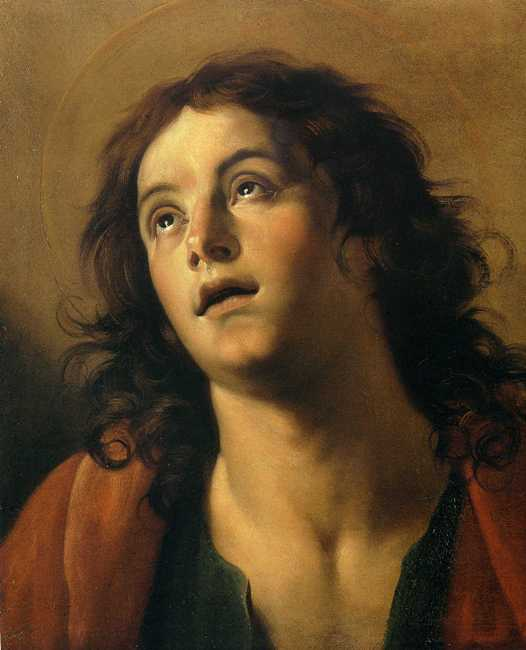
Giuseppe Vermiglio, John the Baptist, oil on canvas, 55 x 45 cm.

Giuseppe Vermiglio (c.1585 – c.1635) was a Caravaggist painter from Northern Italy, active also in Rome.

== Life ==
Our knowledge of Vermiglio's life is sketchy. It is probable that he was born in Alessandria. He spent the first two decades of the seventeenth century in Rome where, while training and working as an artist, he adopted a bohemian lifestyle with a tendency to become involved in brawls with fellow painters; for example, in 1604 he supported his master Adriano di Monteleone's account of a dispute with two unknown artists which had led to Monteleone being wounded by his own wife. The following year Vermiglio was arrested and imprisoned after being discovered at the Monte di Brianza hostel bearing an unlicensed sword. In 1611, proceedings were brought against him for physically attacking the painter Silvio Oliviero. In 1618, still in Rome, he is recorded as a picture dealer.

Around 1620 he returned to northern Italy where he pursued his career as a painter in Piedmont (Novara and Alessandria) and in Lombardy (notably in Mantua and Milan).

His art was profoundly influenced by Caravaggio. Other painters to whom his work, on the basis of stylistic references, is thought to be indebted include the Bolognese Annibale Carracci and Guido Reni; it has been suggested that Vermiglio worked or studied in Bologna at some point. Luigi Lanzi acclaimed the painting of Daniel among the Lions, in the library of the Passione in Milan, as his masterwork.

Judgments of quality of his work have ranged from Alfred Moir's 'inconsequential craftsman' to Lanzi's 'the best painter in oils of which the ancient state of Piedmont could boast, and one of the best Italian artists of his times'.

== Works ==
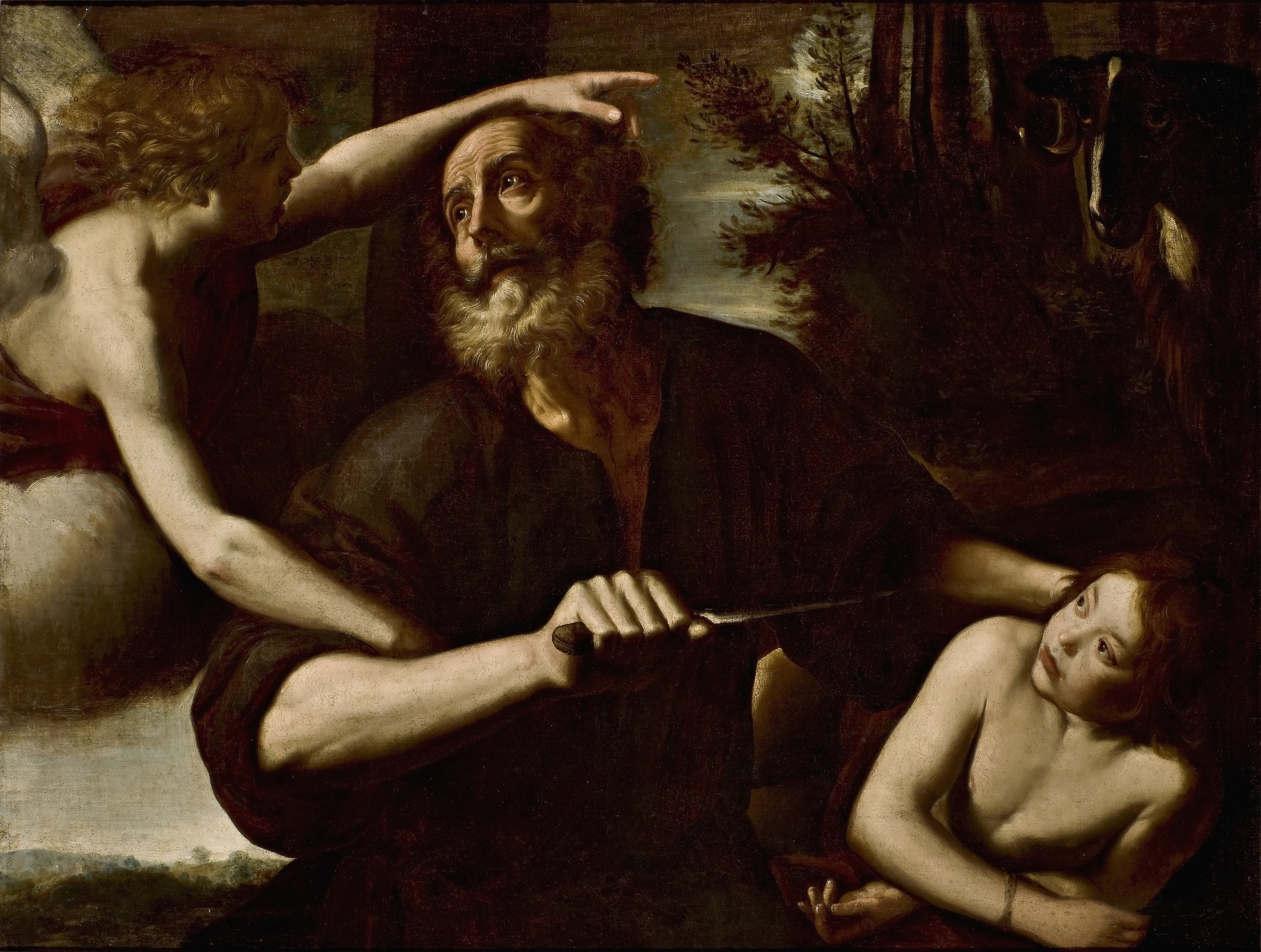
Sacrifice of Isaac (c. 1618–1625)

Paintings by Vermiglio, or which have been attributed to him, include:

- The Incredulity of St Thomas, signed and dated 1612. San Tommaso ai Cenci, Rome.
- Crowning with Thorns / Mocking of Christ, formerly in the Palazzo Altieri, Rome
- Cain and Abel. National Museum of Fine Arts, Valletta.
- Adoration of the Shepherds, signed and dated 1622. Pinacoteca di Brera, Milan.
- Last Supper, signed and dated 1622. Pinacoteca di Brera, Milan.
- The Sacrifice of Isaac. Musei Civici del Castello Sforzesco, Milan.
- Saint James the Major. Repossi Gallery, Italy.

== Sources ==
- Lanzi, Luigi. The History of Painting in Italy. Translated by Thomas Roscoe. London, H. G. Bohn, 1847; Vol. 3, pp. 305–306.
- Gash, John (1998), "The Cain and Abel in the National Museum: The case for Giuseppe Vermiglio" (PDF), Melita Historica New Series (in Italian), vol. 12, no. 3, pp. 267–280, archived from the original (PDF) on 2006-05-27
