= Glaisnock Viaduct =

19th century bridge in East Ayrshire, Scotland

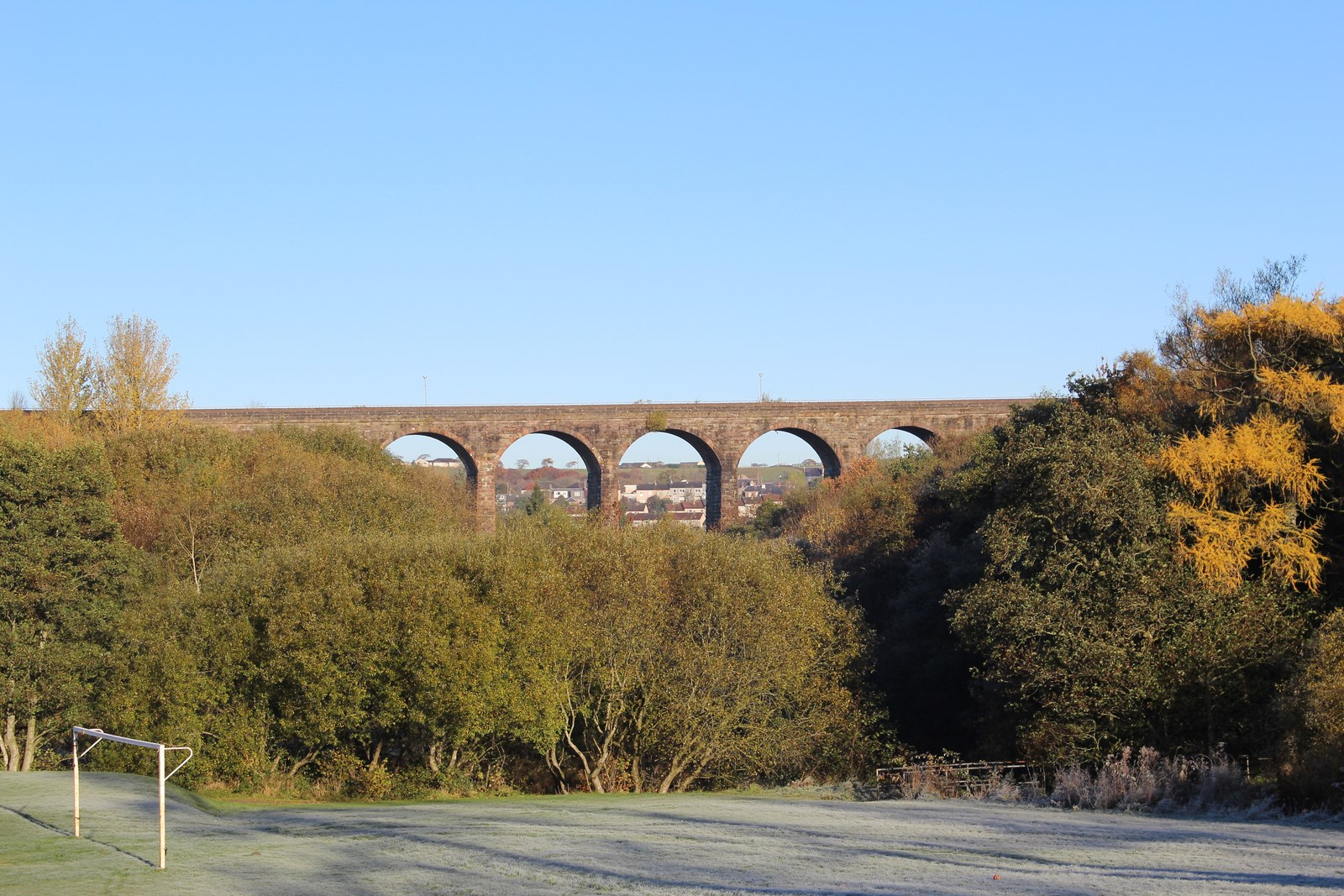
- Glaisnock Viaduct in 2013
- Coordinates: 55.4487°N 4.2566°W
- Carries: Pedestrian Footpath
- Crosses: Glaisnock Water
- Locale: East Ayrshire

Characteristics
- Total length: 160 metres (520 ft)
- Height: 23 metres (75 ft)
- No. of spans: 13

History
- Opened: 1872
- Closed: 1964

Listed Building – Category B
- Official name: Former Railway Viaduct Now Footbridge, Murray Park
- Designated: 17 August 1977
- Reference no.: LB24134

Location
- Interactive map of Glaisnock Viaduct

The Glaisnock Viaduct or Caponacre Viaduct is a viaduct over the Glaisnock Water, on the former Glasgow and South Western Railway. It is located in Cumnock, East Ayrshire.

== History ==
The viaduct was opened in 1872 by the Glasgow and South Western Railway. Under the Beeching cuts, the railway was closed in 1964, although the last train had run on 4 June 1962.

It was restored for pedestrian use in 1972, and is now part of a well-used footpath, going between Wyllie Crescent and Birchwood Road. The viaduct was listed as category B listed building in 1977.

Near the viaduct is a stone known as the "Deil Stane" (Devil Stone), a stone around 6 by 7 feet (1.8 by 2.1 m) in area and 15 inches (380 mm) high, with a mark resembling a cloven hoof, said by local legend to be made by the Devil.

== Design ==
It is a masonry viaduct with 13 spans and segmental arches. The highest arch is around 75 feet (23 m) high, and the structure is around 160 metres (520 ft) long. The viaduct runs in an east-west direction, with a slight curve to the south. The piers, spandrels, and parapets are rubble with red ashlar underneath the arches.

Close to the viaduct is the Murray Park. Cumnock, at the confluence of the Glaisnock Water the Holm Burn. Cumnock has two viaducts, the other being the Woodroad Viaduct.

== See also ==
- List of bridges in Scotland
