= Andrew Moir =

Andrew Moir may refer to:

- Andrew Moir (anatomist) (1806–1844), Scottish anatomist linked to a body-snatching scandal
- Andrew Moir (filmmaker), Canadian documentary filmmaker
- Andrew Moir (footballer) (born 1959), Australian rules footballer
