= John Moir =

John Moir may refer to:

- John Moir (basketball) (1915–1975), American basketball player
- John William Moir (1851–1940), African Lakes Corporation
- John Moir (politician) (1856–1939), Western Australian politician
- John Moir (settler) (1851–1939), Western Australian settler and pastoralist
- John Moir (physician) (1808–1899), Scottish physician
- John Moir (priest) (1814–1889), Scottish Episcopalian priest
