= Kyle Castle =

- Dalblair, Muirkirk, East Ayrshire, Scotland; UK grid reference NS64741920
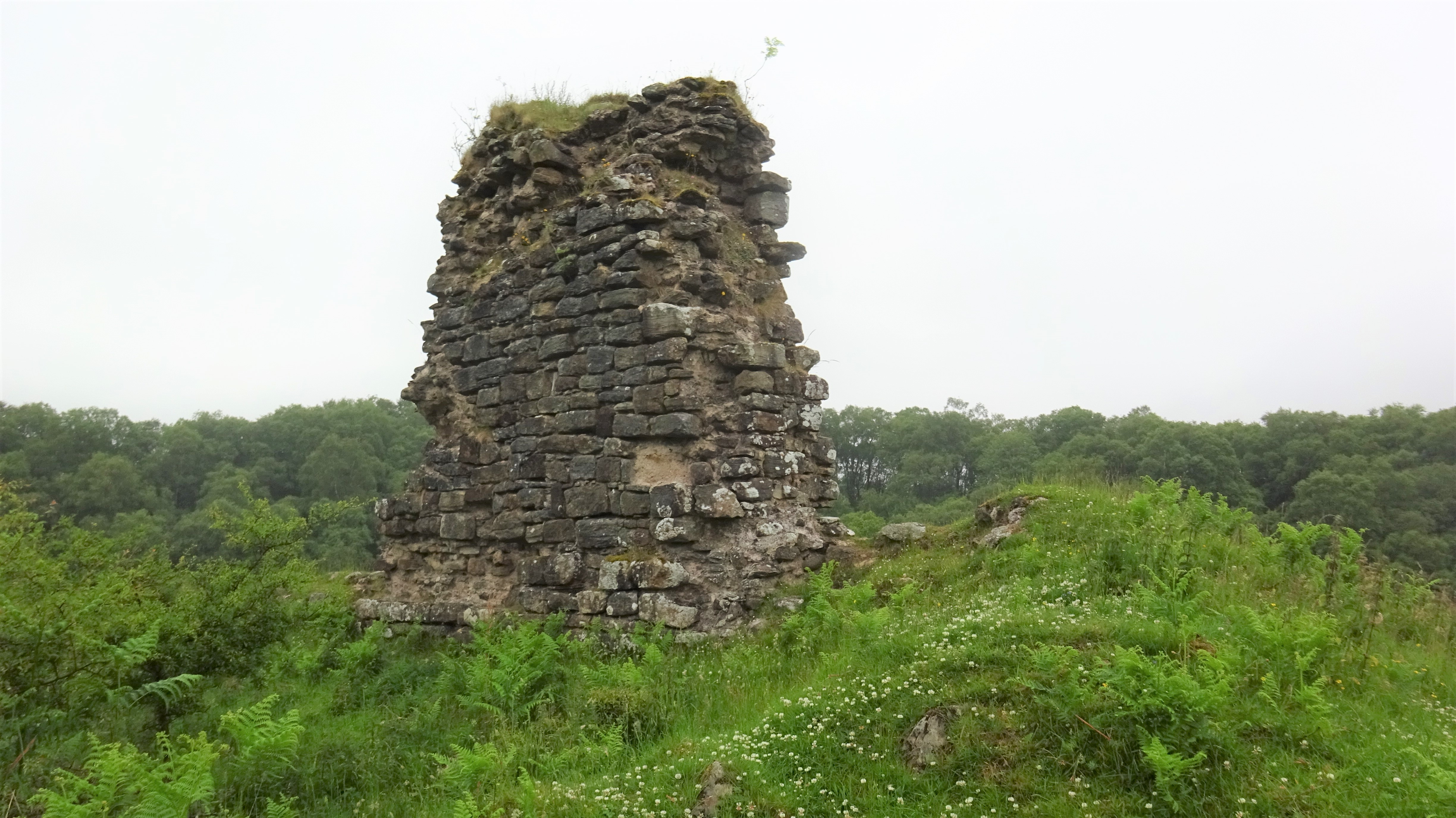
- Remnants of the castle's keep from the courtyard area

Site information
- Type: A tower castle with a courtyard
- Owner: Marquis of Bute
- Open to the public: Yes
- Condition: Ruined and extensively robbed

Location
- Kyle Castle
- Coordinates: 55.447921°N 4.1400316°W

Site history
- Built: 15th century
- Built by: Farquhar of Gilmilnscroft
- In use: 15th to early 18th century
- Materials: Stone

The ruins of the large courtyard style Kyle Castle, once also known as Cavil Castle or occasionally Dalblair Castle lie close to the hamlet of Dalblair in Auchinleck parish near Muirkirk in the East Ayrshire council area, Scotland. The castle stands at the confluence of the Guelt Water and the Glenmuir Water on a peninsula carved out by these rivers. Its name suggests that it was once of some significance.

A drawing of the castle when still intact was apparently kept at “the church at Coylton." The sketch is said to have depicted a four-storied Scottish Tower House with four rooms connected by a staircase.

Significantly the castle or fortalice stands at the boundary of the old lands of Kyle Regis and Kyle Stewart, marked by the confluence of the two rivers that join to form the Glenmuir Water. Nearby on the lands of Kyle Stewart stands the large Dornal Motte, a fortification that is recorded as 'Danhell' on Timothy Pont's 16th century map.

== History ==
The first written record in 1445 shows that Kyle Castle and its lands were previously held by the monks of Melrose Abbey before the Farquhars of Gilmilnscroft obtained possession, John Farquhar having been granted them in a charter granted by a Commendator of Melrose Abbey. The Farquhars obtained further charters to lands from the abbot of Melrose, eventually including the lands of Gilmilnscroft itself. Margaret, a daughter of the Laird of Barquharrie, was the wife of John Farquhar. The Cunninghams at some later stage gained possession, followed by the Stewarts of Bute.

Very little written or verbal history survives regarding Kyle Castle except however for inevitable links with 'Old King Cole or Coilus' that have been regularly suggested. The castle's stone has been heavily robbed for use in building dry stone dykes and domestic buildings at Dalblair and Kyle Farms. The preservation of a small section of the castle may relate to the need for readily identifiable landmarks in this remote and relatively featureless landscape.

Evidence from maps indicated that the castle was abandoned and in ruins towards the last quarter of the 18th century.

== Description ==
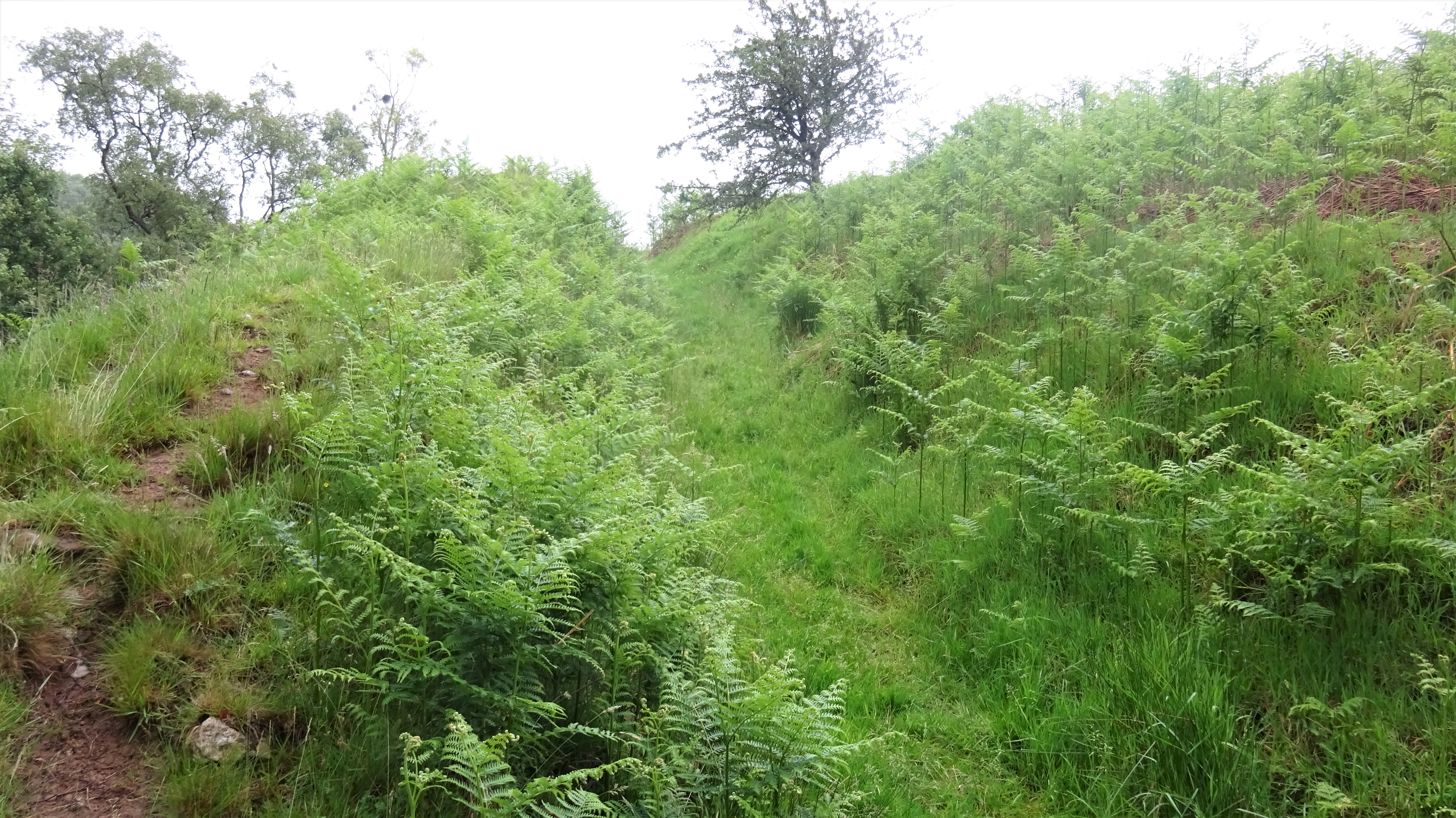
The covered walkway

The castle's chosen location is one of considerable strength with very steep slopes on three sides. Kyle has been dated from the surviving stonework as being 15th to 16th century with a strong rectangular keep that is now 14.0m by 7.0m externally. The surviving ashlar north wall section is 6.1m long, 5.5m high and 1.8, thick. Kyle stands atop a natural flat-topped spur which appears to have had a surrounding barmkin or courtyard wall as suggested by the elevated sections along the edge of the enclosure and a possible watchtower at the extreme western end. To the west a deep narrow 'covered way' curves up to the courtyard area and the keep. The dates of these structures may not be contemporary. Remains of a dry defensive moat lies on the north-east side of the tower castle ruins. A lower terrace with rig and furrow lies to the north. As stated a turf-covered footing of a possible watchtower lies at the extreme western edge of the courtyard.

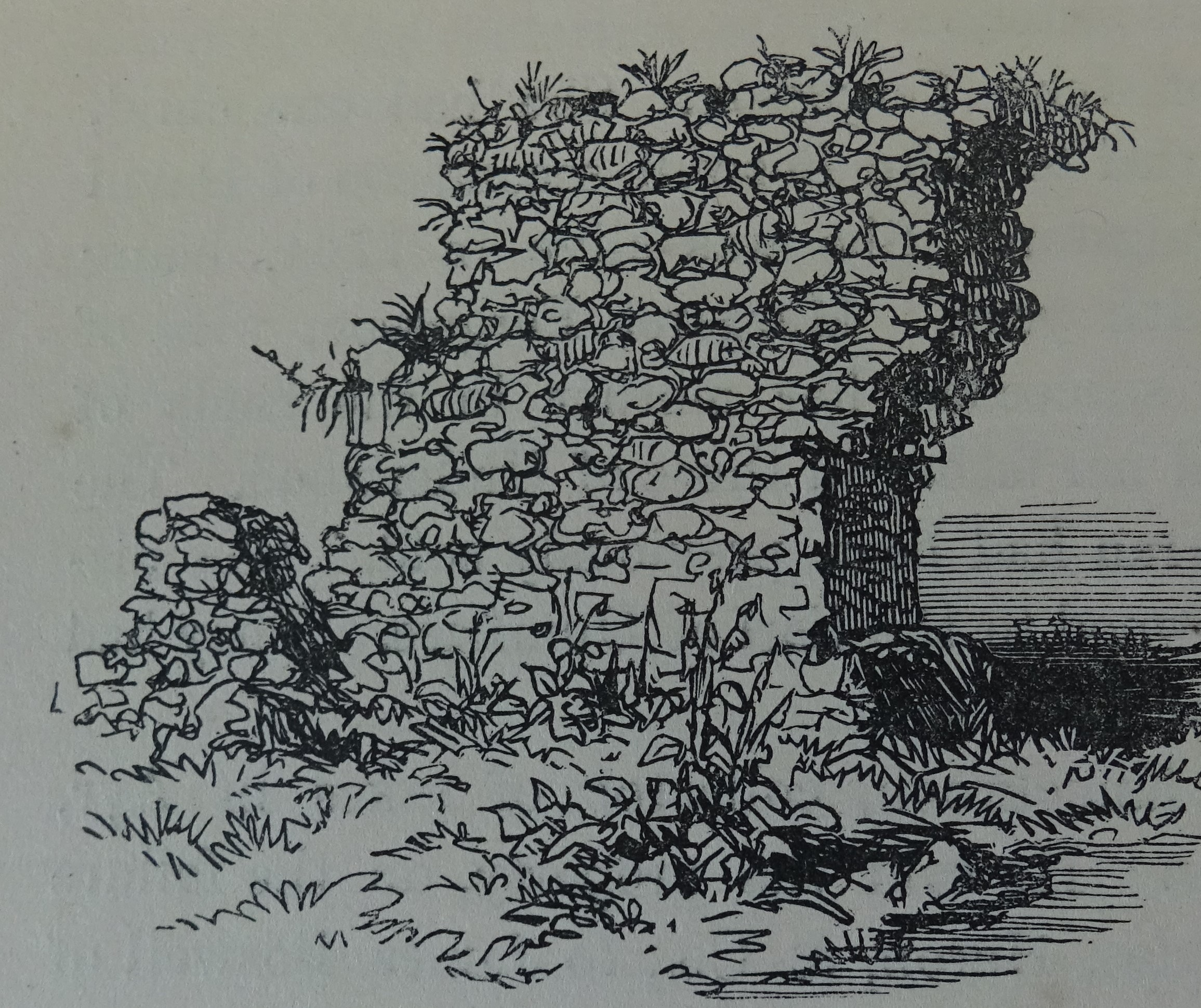
The castle ruins in 1863.

Timothy Pont's 16th century map of Kyle shows Castle Keyil (sic) on its natural mound with three towers and a curtain wall or palisade. Although these drawings were only indicative the castle is shown to be larger than the others in the district and unlike many of the others, it is named as a castle. Castle Kyle is shown on Adair's map of 1685 although Dornal Motte is not marked. Castle Kyil (sic) is shown as a single tower on Moll's map of 1745. Roy's mid 18th century map shows the Castle of Kyle, and an un-named group of buildings that may be Kyle Farm, suggesting that some robbing of stone from the castle or courtyard may have already taken place. In 1775 the castle is shown and marked as a ruin on Armstrong's map. In 1832 Thomson's map records the castle as being in ruins.

As stated the castle structures were robbed of stone which was used to build dry stone dykes and the nearby farm buildings and it is recorded that considerable difficulty was experienced in extracting stones from the mortar.

It may be no accident that the ruins that remain form a useful landmark in this desolate and relatively featureless landscape. An engraving made in 1863 shows that the ruins have changed little over the last century and a half or so.
