= John Moyer (disambiguation) =

John Moyer may refer to:

- John Moyer (born 1973), American musician, bassist for the band Disturbed
- John Moyer (American football) (born 1975), American football player in the Arena Football League
- John Moyer (comedian) (born 1969), American comedian and screenwriter
- John Gould Moyer (1893–1976), 31st governor of American Samoa
- John A. Moyer (1922–2014), American politician in the state of Washington
- John Moyer Heathcote (1834–1912), English barrister and real tennis player
