= William Church Moir =

Canadian businessman (1822–1896)

- Born: William Church Moir; 2 May 1822; Halifax, Nova Scotia
- Died: 5 July 1896 (aged 74)
- Occupation: Baker
- Spouse: Maria Ward

William Church Moir (2 May 1822 – 5 July 1896) was the son of Benjamin Moir and Mary Isabella Church, declared by many as one of the most energetic and enterprising businessmen in Halifax, Nova Scotia.

== Professional life ==
Scottish-Canadian businessman and the founder of Moir’s Chocolate. He moved to Halifax, Nova Scotia with his family when he was young and took over his father’s bakery, Moir & Co. Steam Bakery & Flour Mill, in 1845 at the age of 23. He expanded his bakery business to become one of the largest and most modern in Canada, employing more than 260 workers and producing over 11,000 loaves of bread daily by the time of his death. In 1873, he and his son, James Ward Moir, launched Moir’s Chocolate, which offered over 500 varieties of confectionery and became a nationwide sensation.

Moir was a pioneer in using steam-baking technology in Canada, which improved his efficiency and output. He also ventured into other industries, such as flour and woodworking mills, paper-box manufacturing, timber lands, and real estate. He overcame many obstacles and hardships in his career, including a workers’ strike and boycott in 1877, a financial crisis in 1881, and a factory fire in 1891. He recovered from these challenges and continued to grow his business and influence. He was regarded as one of the most successful and prominent entrepreneurs in Canadian history.

== Children ==
- Annie Moir
- James Ward Moir, president and general manager in 1890
- Willam C. Moir
- Maud Moir
- Benjamin Moir, established Ben's bakery
- Henry Moir
