= Raymond Moyer =

Raymond Moyer may refer to:

- Ray Moyer (1898–1986), American set decorator
- Raymond J. Moyer (1926–2014), American businessman and politician
