= Teba =

- Municipality and town
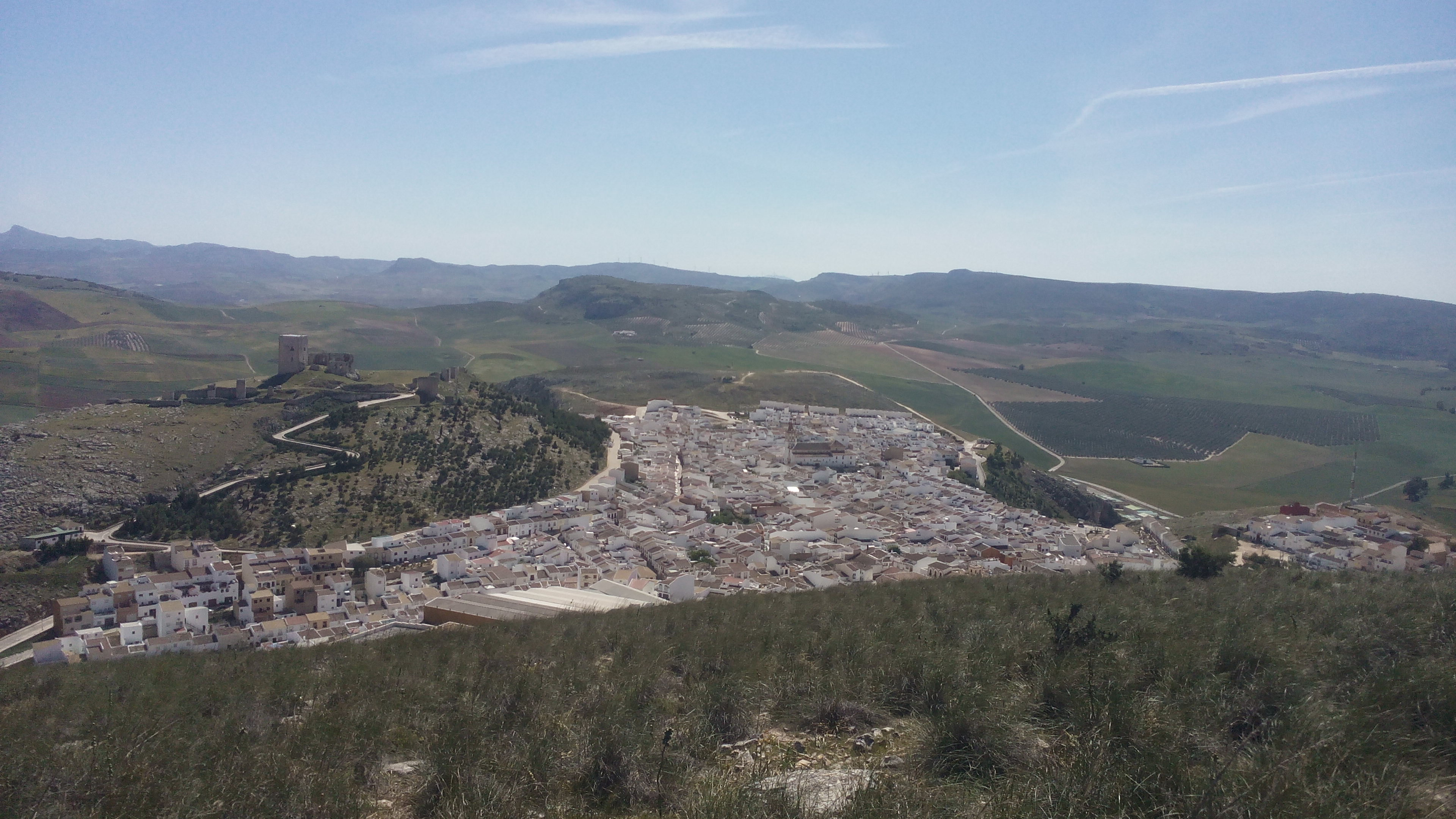

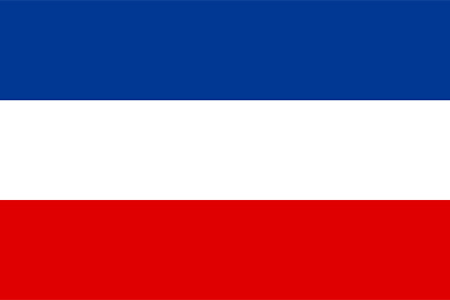
- Flag Coat of arms

- Municipal location in Málaga Province

- Location in Spain
- Coordinates: 36°58′N 4°56′W
- Sovereign state: Spain
- Autonomous community: Andalusia
- Province: Málaga
- Comarca: Guadalteba

Government
  - Mayor: Cristóbal-Miguel Corral Maldonado

Area
  - Total: 143.0 km^{2} (55.2 sq mi)
- Elevation: 555 m (1,821 ft)

Population (2025-01-01)
  - Total: 3,708
  - Density: 26.91/km^{2} (69.7/sq mi)
- Time zone: UTC+1 (CET)
  - Summer (DST): UTC+2 (CEST)
- Postal code: 29327
- Website: www.teba.es

Teba is a town and municipality located in the province of Málaga in the autonomous community of Andalusia in southern Spain. It is situated in the northeast of the province, in Guadalteba comarca. As of 2018, its population is 3,818. The town is the site of the Battle of Teba, which took place in 1330 during the Reconquista.

In the so-called Battle of Teba, a war event that had as its main consequence the capture of the Castillo de la Estrella by Alfonso XI in August 1330, the Scottish nobleman, Sir James Douglas, died along with a group of Scots, while trying to help the Castilian king in the conquest of the fortress. The reason for his presence there is given by having been commissioned by the liberating king of Scotland, Robert I of Scotland, who had achieved independence from England before dying of leprosy, to take his embalmed heart to the Holy Land. Scottish legends tell that Sir James threw his king's heart to the Muslims who had ambushed him, thus fulfilling the king's wish to fight the infidels. In memory of this event, a monument was erected in the town, which is twinned with the Scottish town of Melrose. Likewise, and in commemoration of the events, a festive day known as Douglas' Days is celebrated annually in Teba.

== See also ==
- List of municipalities in Málaga
