= Glaisnock Water =

Coordinates: 55°27′10″N 4°16′04″W

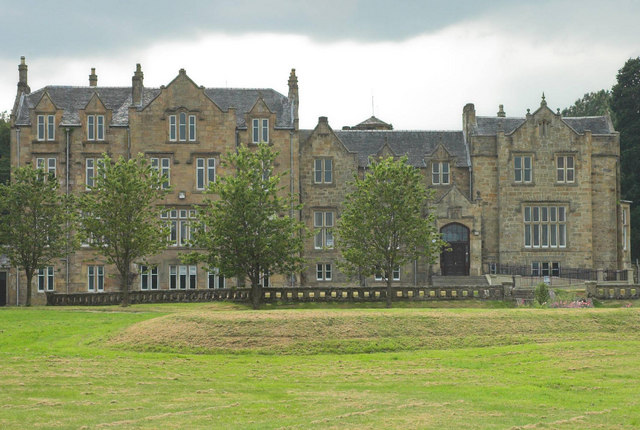
- The Glaisnock flows in front of Glaisnock House

Location
- Country: Scotland
- Region: Ayrshire

Physical characteristics
- Source
  - location: Carsgailoch Hill
- Mouth
  - location: River Lugar

Basin features
- River system: Ayr
- Tributaries
  - left: Horsecleugh/Bowes Burn
  - right: Holm Burn

The Glaisnock Water is a tributary of the Lugar Water in East Ayrshire, Scotland. It passes under the Glaisnock Viaduct. The source is located south of the town of Cumnock, through which it flows.

== Course ==
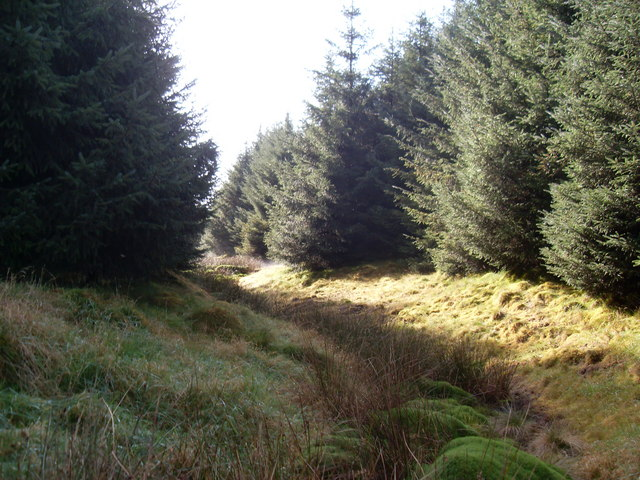
Carsgailoch Spring This tiny burn becomes Carsgailoch Runner then Horsecleugh Burn, before meeting Glaisnock Water and then joining Lugar Water in Cumnock.

The source of the Glaisnock is to be found in the foothills and boggy knolls of the Glaisnock Moss near Carsgailoch Hill. Close to the source there is the Carsgailoch Martyrs Monument marking the spot where three covenanters were shot by government troops in 1685.

The stream flows north towards the town of Cumnock, collecting an outflow from the Black Loch, passing Glaisnock House then crossing under the A76, entering Cumnock's Caponacre industrial estate and skirting Murray Park where it is joined by the Holm Burn which rises on the north-west flank of Avisyard Hill. The river then makes its way under the Glaisnock Viaduct towards Cumnock before finally joining the Lugar Water near the town centre.
