= Lugar Water =

Lugar Water River Lugar
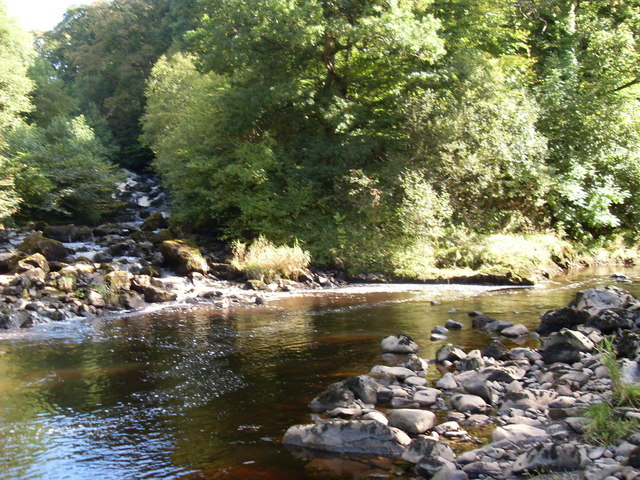
- The point at which Bellow Water (on the left) meets Glenmuir Water, forming Lugar Water.
- Native name: Uisge Lugar (Scottish Gaelic)

Location
- Country: Scotland
- Region: Ayrshire
- District: East Ayrshire
- Towns: Lugar, Cumnock, Ochiltree

Physical characteristics
- Source
  - location: Southern Uplands, East Ayrshire, Scotland
- Mouth: River Ayr
  - coordinates: 55°29′51″N 4°23′10″W

Basin features
- Tributaries
  - left: Glaisnock Water, Burnock Water, Rose Burn
  - right: Dippol Burn, Auchinleck Burn

The Lugar Water, or River Lugar, is created by the confluence of the Bellow Water and the Glenmuir Water, just north of Lugar, both of which flow from the hills of the Southern Uplands in East Ayrshire, Scotland.

== Course ==
=== Source to Cumnock ===
The river flows through the small mining village of Lugar, where at Bellow Mill, William Murdoch, the inventor of gas lighting was born in 1754. A cave where he carried out a lot of his experiments can still be seen on the riverbank. The river then flows on through the town of Cumnock, under the Woodroad Viaduct, where its water was used in earlier times to power grain mills and where it is joined by Glaisnock Water.

=== Cumnock to Ochiltree ===
West of Cumnock the river continues its journey through Dumfries Estate, formerly owned by the Marquess of Bute. In July 2007 a consortium led by Charles III (then the Prince of Wales) succeeded in purchasing the house, contents and estate. The estate was then managed under the auspices of his Dumfries House Trust, and since 2018 The Prince's Foundation.

Close to Dumfries House the river flows beneath the Avenue Bridge, designed by John Adam. who also designed and built Dumfries House. A few yards downstream the Lugar flows beneath an elegant Chinese footbridge built in 2017.

Continuing west the river reaches the village of Ochiltree, where it is joined by the Burnock Water and its waters are harnessed by a weir which drove the local grain mills in days gone by. Here Atlantic salmon have been seen jumping the fish ladder, which allows them to reach their spawning grounds in the upper reaches of the river. The river also holds a good stock of the native brown trout, and these are fished for by anglers of all ages.

=== Lower Reaches ===
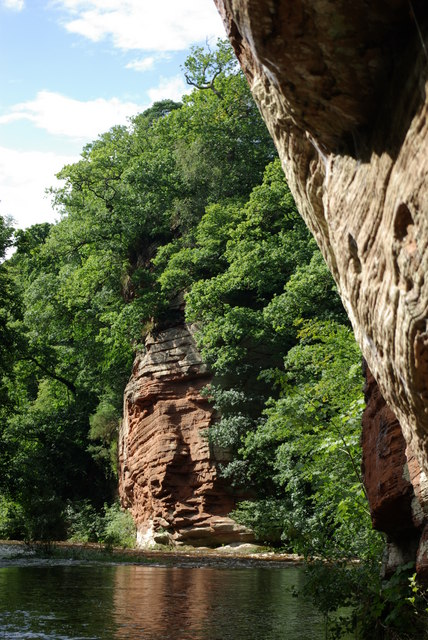
Lugar Water near Wallace's Cave

The river now enters a gorge of red sandstone with high cliffs on either side. High on one of these cliffs stand the ruins of Ochiltree Castle and beneath this can be found Wallace's Cave, where William Wallace allegedly hid from his pursuers.

The Lugar now reaches the end of its journey of some twenty miles. Two miles south of Mauchline the Lugar joins the River Ayr, which carries its waters to the sea.

== Wildlife ==
Kingfishers and dippers are two of the avian species to be found on its riverbanks, along with yellow and pied wagtails, chaffinch, goldfinch and the tiny wren.

== Gallery ==
Photographs of the Lugar
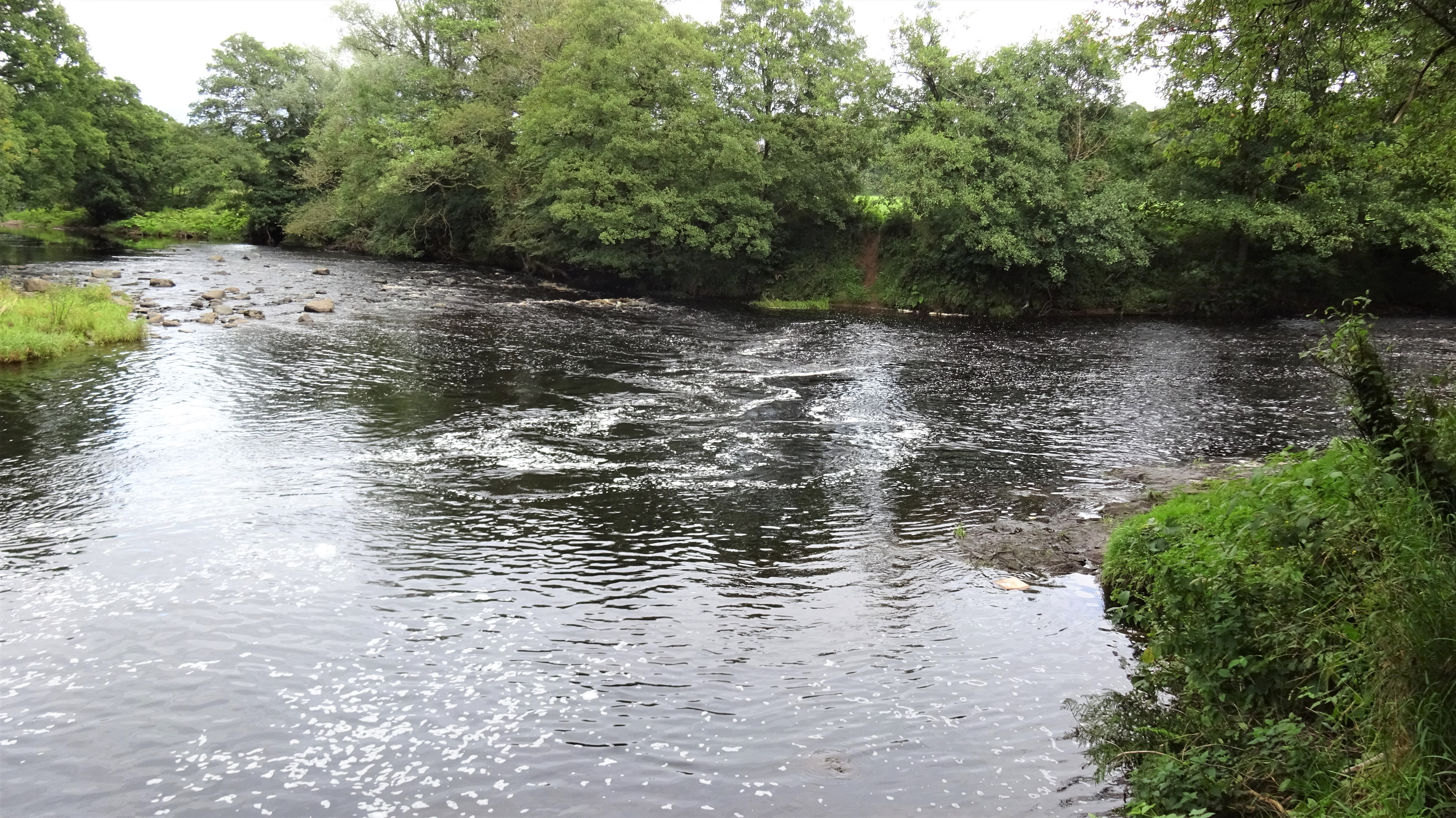
Confluence of the Lugar and Ayr rivers, Barskimming, Ayrshire

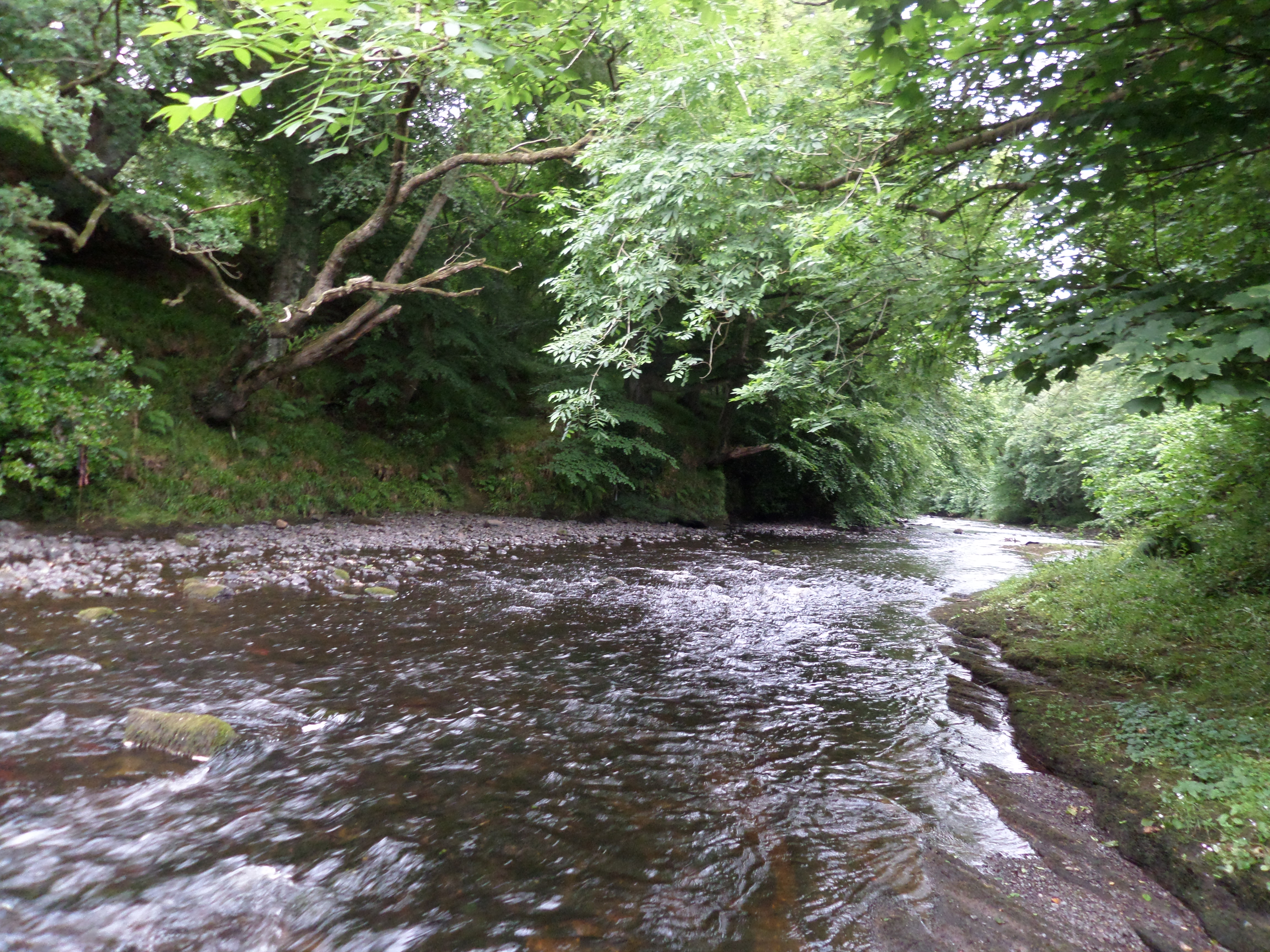
The Slatehole Ford, River Lugar, East Ayrshire, Scotland

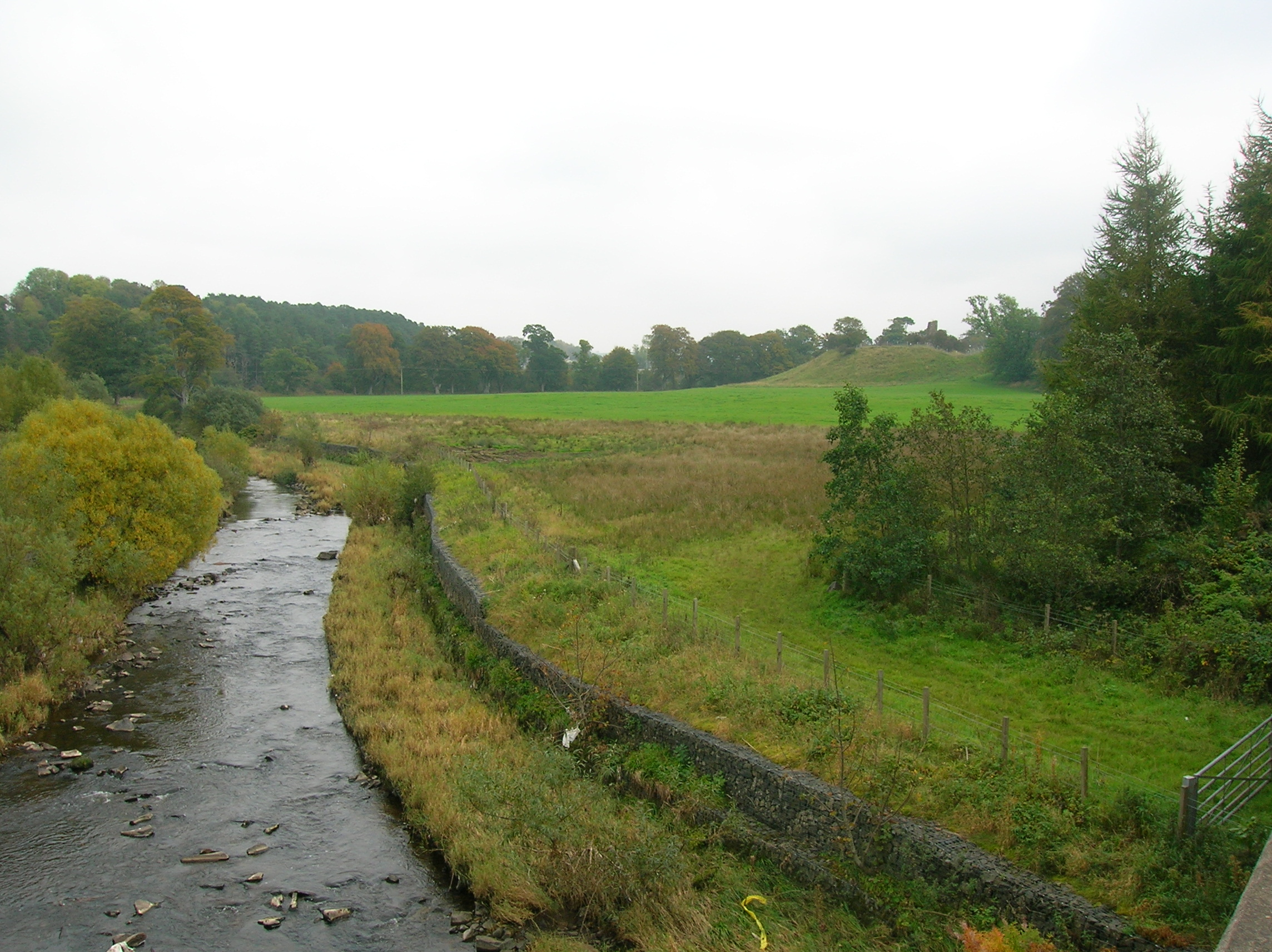
The River Lugar with Taringzean Castle to the right

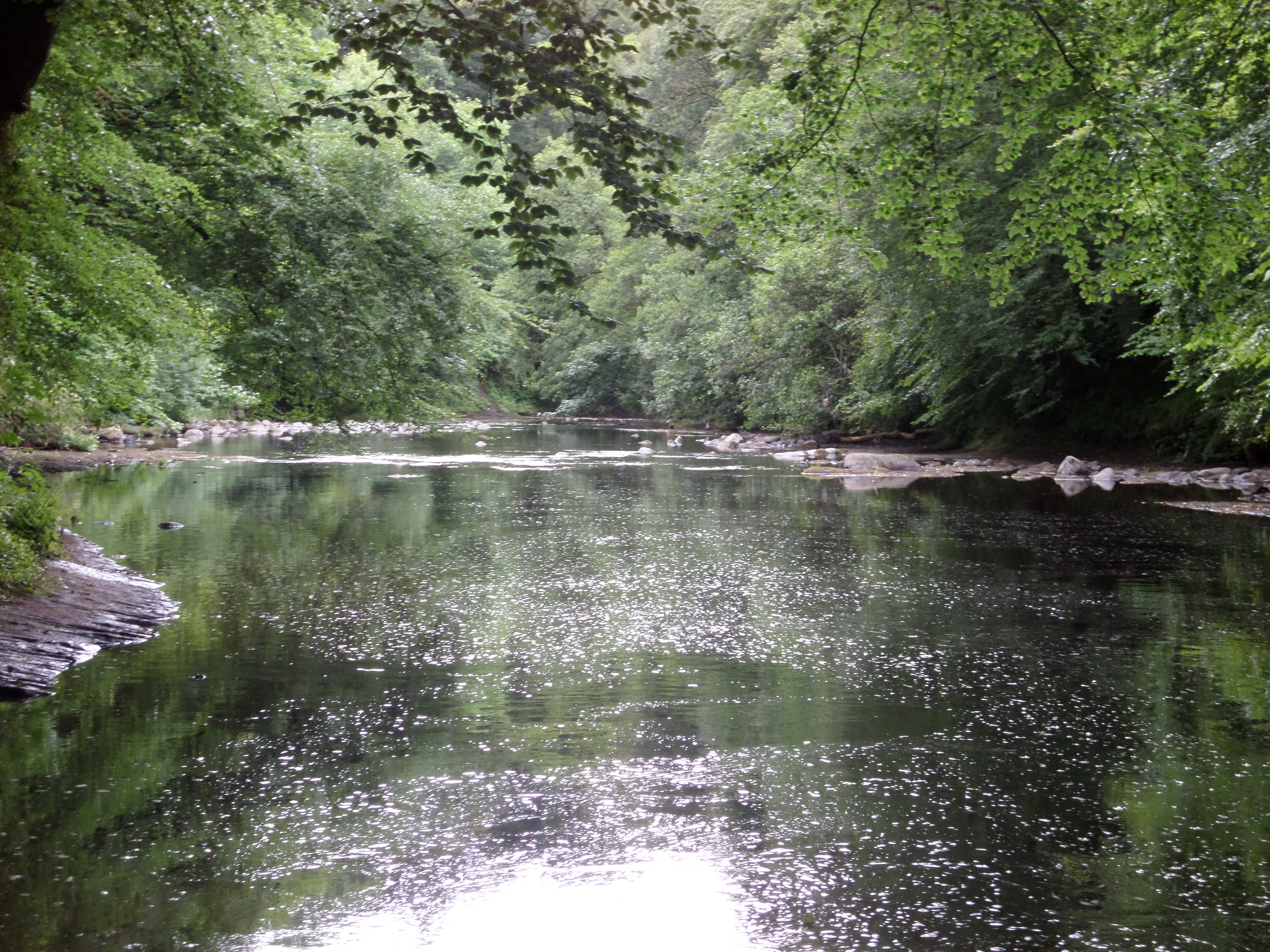
Peden's Cave view, River Lugar Gorge, East Ayrshire, Scotland

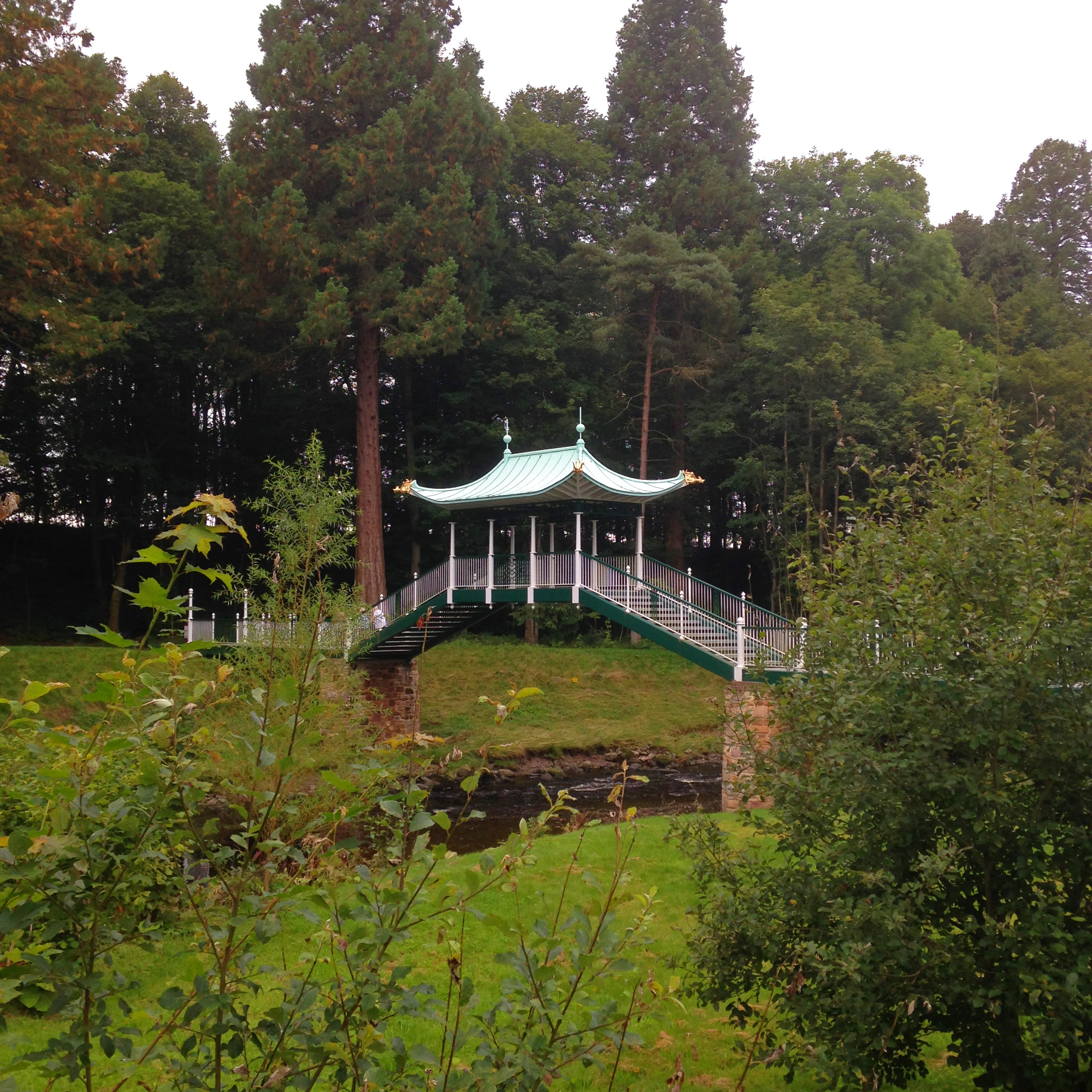
Chinese Bridge over River Lugar at Dumfries House

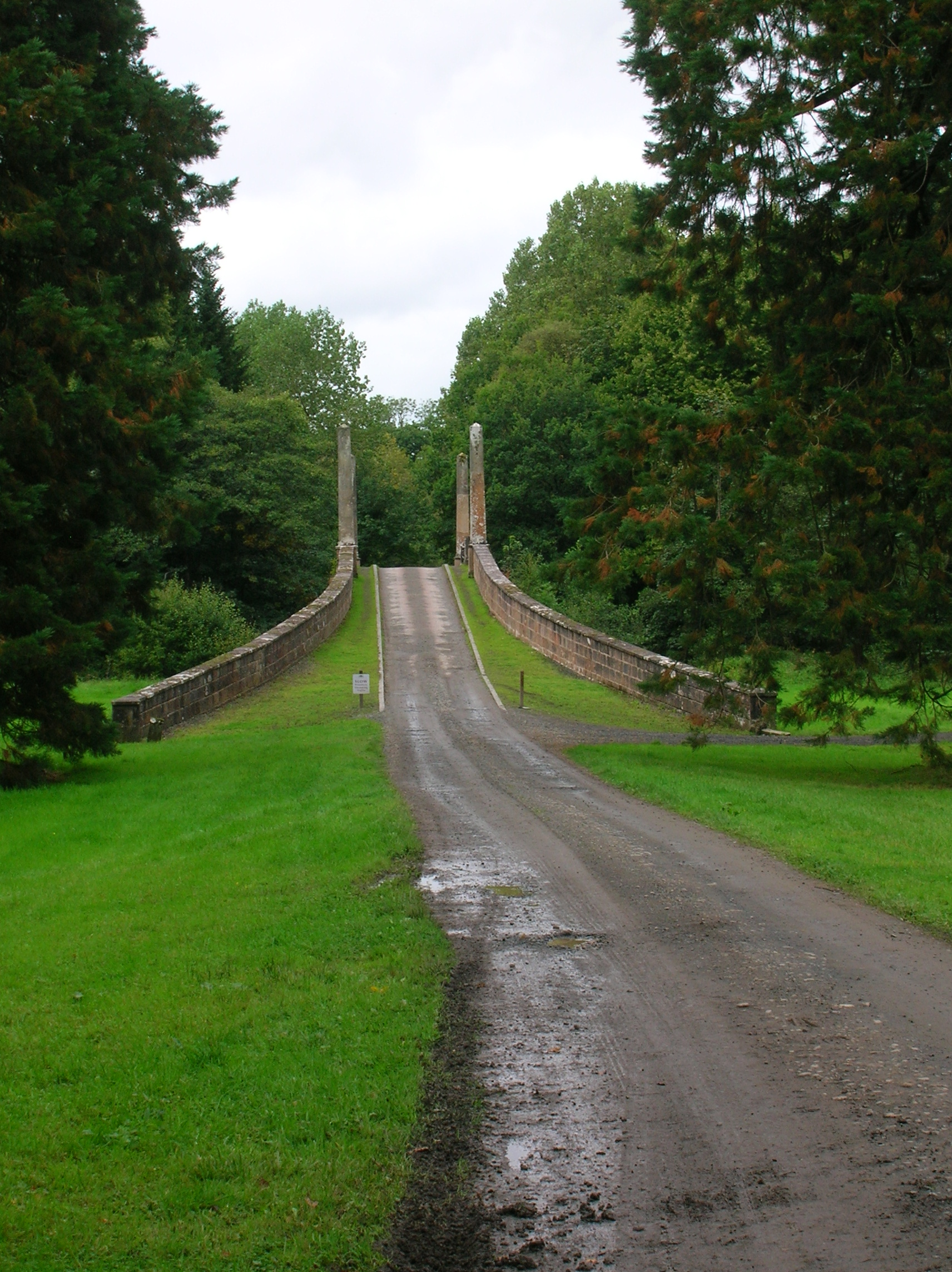
John Adam designed Avenue Bridge, Dumfries House
