= Melinda Wenner Moyer =

American journalist

Melinda Wenner Moyer is a science journalist and author based in the Hudson Valley, New York. She is a contributing editor at Scientific American and a columnist for Slate. Her first book How To Raise Kids Who Aren't Assholes was published on July 20, 2021 by Putnam Books and was excerpted in The New York Times, The Atlantic, and Parents magazine. Her second book Hello, Cruel World!: Science-Based Strategies for Raising Terrific Kids in Terrifying Times was published on May 27, 2025.

== Early life and education ==
Moyer attended The Westminster Schools in Atlanta and graduated summa cum laude from St. Paul's School, Concord, New Hampshire in 1997. At the University of Michigan she received a Bachelor of Science in molecular biology and a Bachelor of Music in composition. With a science education, she worked at a biotech company in the UK before deciding to switch careers and become a science writer. In 2006 she received a master's degree in Science, Health and Environmental Reporting (SHERP) from New York University.

== Career ==
Early in her career, she worked briefly as an editor, and then became a freelance journalist. Her early features were for institutional publications, particularly in Pitt Med, of the University of Pittsburgh School of Medicine. Clips from these writings were used to showcase her talent, and this opened the doors to more prestigious publications.

After a "fat pitch" to Slate, Moyer became a frequent contributor. She then became the science-based parenting columnist, and has written over 100 articles for Slate. In 2022, she began writing the Well newsletter for The New York Times. Other publications have included The Atlantic, Mother Jones, Nature, Discover, Popular Science, O: The Oprah magazine and, Self, among others. She also writes a Substack newsletter, Now What, that ranks within the top 5 parenting newsletters.

In March, 2019(?), she became a visiting scholar at New York University. She had previously been an adjunct assistant professor of journalism at the CUNY Graduate School of Journalism. She was a 2018 Alicia Patterson Foundation Fellow. In 2020 she joined the faculty of New York University's Science, Health & Environmental Reporting Program. In 2017 an article she wrote for Scientific American was a finalist for a National Magazine Award.

== Awards ==
- Outstanding Opinion Article, American Society of Journalists and Authors, 2019, for "Anti-Vaccine Activists Have Taken Vaccine Science Hostage" in the New York Times
- Excellence in Reporting, American Society of Journalists and Authors, 2018, for “Journey to Gunland," writing in Scientific American
- June Roth Award for a Medical Article, American Society of Journalists and Authors, 2018, for "Deserted,"published in Women’s Health
- American Speech-Language-Hearing Association Media Award, 2017, for "You Eated Gogurt for Bekfast!" in Slate
- Awards for Excellence in Health Care Reporting, 2017, for "The Looming Threat of Factory-Farm Superbugs" in Scientific American
- Folio Eddie award for best single article in Consumer: Science/Technology, 2017 for "The Looming Threat of Factory-Farm Superbugs"
- American College of Emergency Physicians Journalism of Excellence Award, 2010, for "Cold Relief" in Popular Science

== Personal life ==
She married science journalist and executive editor of Quanta Magazine Michael Moyer in 2009. As of 2024, they are in the process of divorce. They have two children.
