= Alfred Moir =

American art historian

- Born: April 12, 1924; Minneapolis, Minnesota
- Died: November 13, 2010 (aged 86); Santa Barbara, California
- Other name: Alfred Kummer Moir
- Education: Harvard University
- Scientific career
- Fields: art history
- Workplaces: University of California, Santa Barbara
- Thesis: The Character and Development of Caravaggism in Italy and its Regional Aspects (1953)

Alfred Moir (14 April 1924—13 November 2010) was an art historian, collector and author of numerous books on baroque art.

Moir (pronounced 'Moi-er') was the son of William Wilmerding Moir and Blanche Kummer. Between 1943 and 1946, he served in the U.S. Army, turning down an officer's commission to retire as Master Sergeant.

In 1948, Moir obtained his bachelor's from Harvard, followed, in 1949, by an M.A. After being granted a Ph.D. by Harvard University in 1953, Moir taught at Newcomb–Tulane College, New Orleans. He joined the University of California, Santa Barbara in 1963, from where he retired emeritus in 1991.

== Bibliography ==
- Moir, Alfred (1967). The Italian followers of Caravaggio. London: Oxford University Press. ISBN 9780317105742.
- Moir, Alfred (1976). Caravaggio and His Copyists. New York: New York University Press. ISBN 9780814754085.
- Moir, Alfred (1982). Caravaggio. New York: Harry N. Abrams.
- Moir, Alfred (1994). Van Dyck. New York: Harry N. Abrams. ISBN 9780810939172.
