= Lochend Loch (Coylton) =

Coordinates: 55°26′55.7″N 4°30′37.4″W

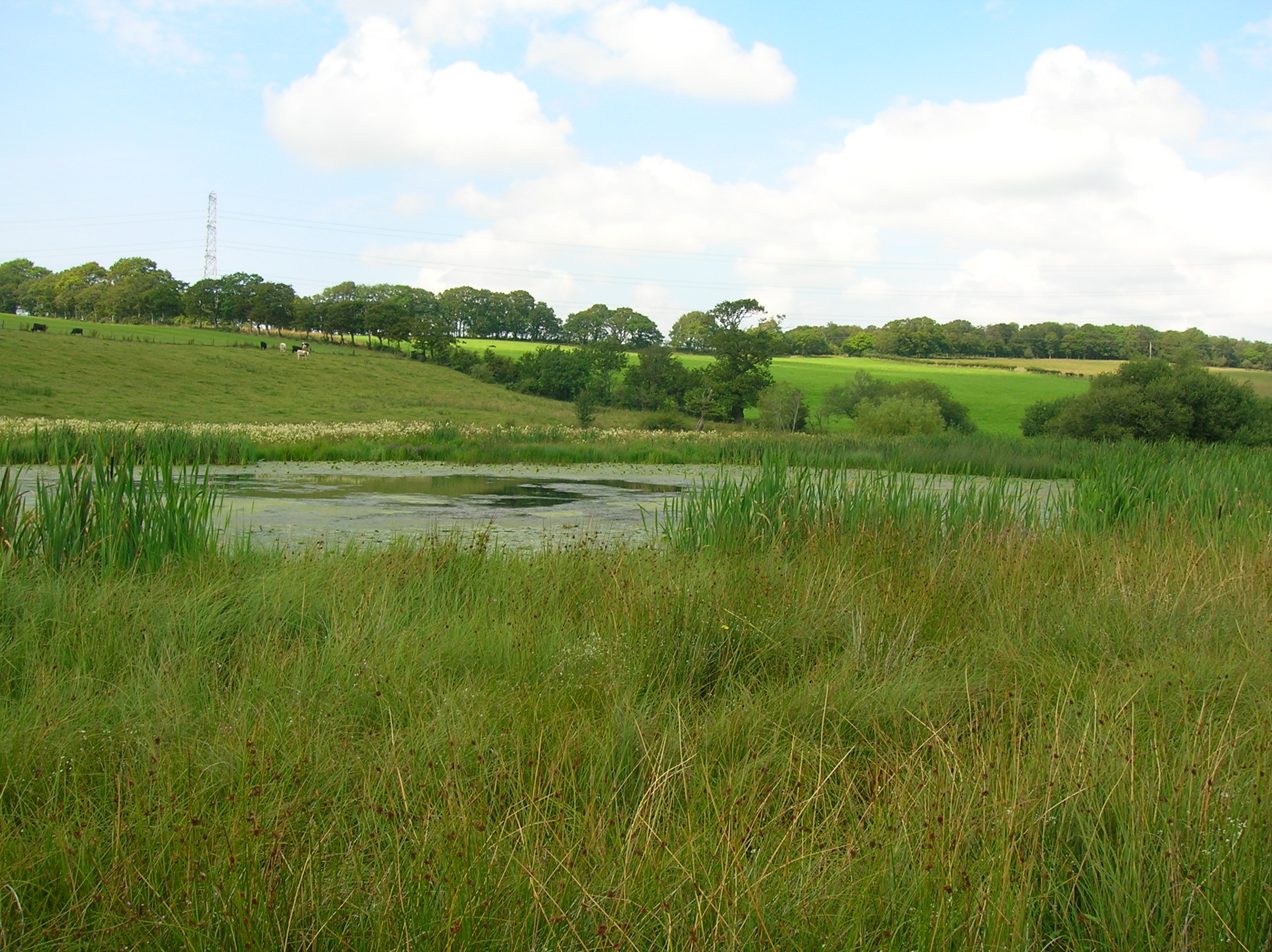
- Lochend Loch

- The location of Lochend Loch, South Ayrshire
- Location: Coylton, South Ayrshire, Scotland
- Type: Freshwater loch
- Primary inflows: Joppa Burn, rainwater and field drainage
- Primary outflows: Lochend Burn running to the Water of Coyle
- Basin countries: Scotland
- Surface area: Formerly 2–3 acres (0.81–1.21 ha)
- Max. depth: Formerly 14 ft (4.3 m)
- Surface elevation: 192 ft (59 m)
- Islands: One
- Settlements: Ayr

Lochend Loch, which once had nearly three acres in surface area is now only a small freshwater loch remnant. It lies in the South Ayrshire Council Area, lying on the hill above Joppa, between Gallowhill and Lochend Farm.

== History ==
=== The loch ===
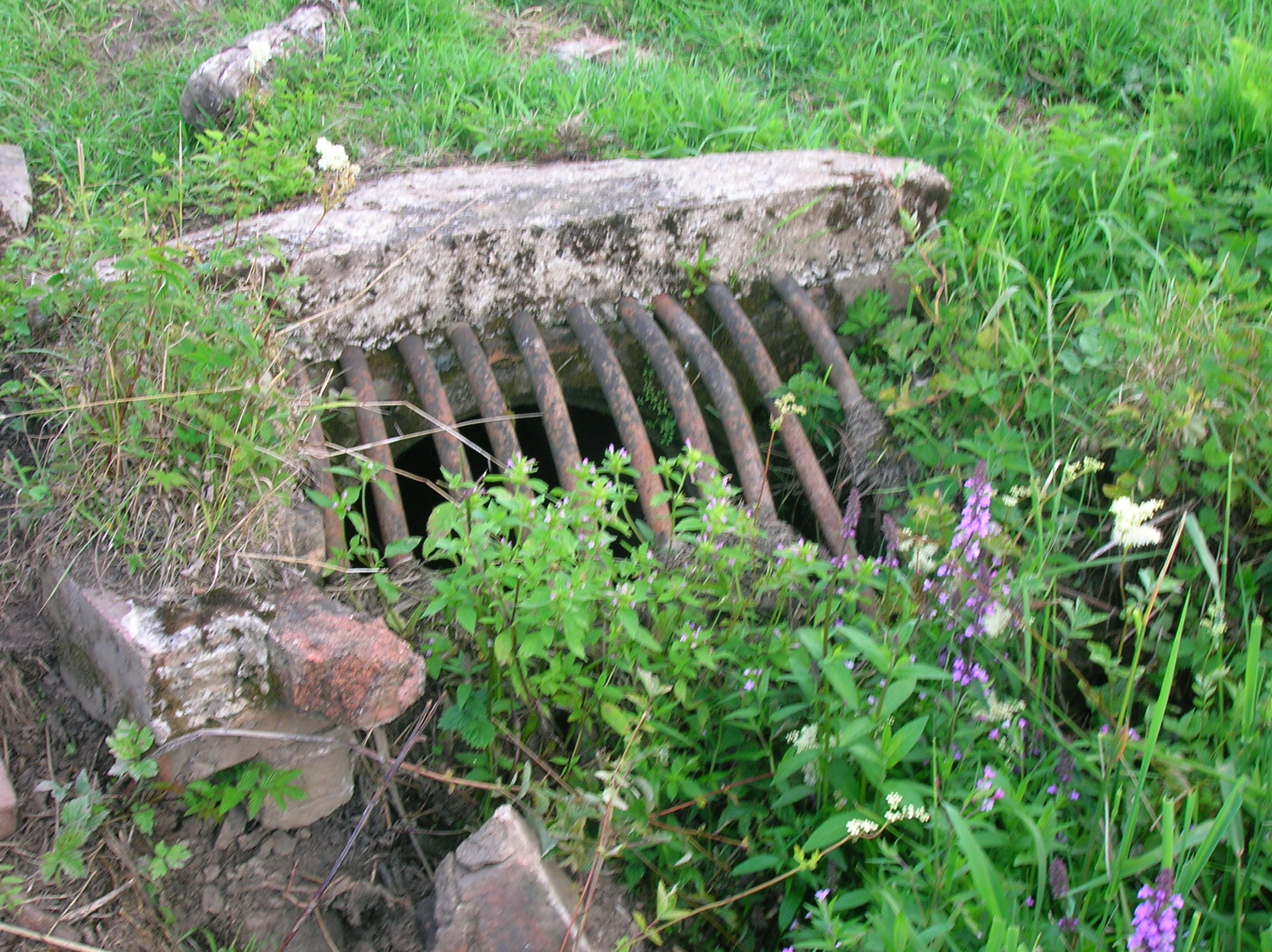
The main outflow drainage pipe.

Lochend Loch was a post-glacial 'Kettle Hole' lying within a substantial depression and fed by the relatively minor flow of the Joppa Burn, field runoff and rainfall, its outflow running into the Water of Coyle as the Barwhey or Barquey Burn. A small islet is indicated on the early OS maps, no longer shown when the loch level was lowered in the late 1890s or early 1900s. Roy's map of 1747 shows the then sizeable loch with a roughly circular island near the centre of the loch; the outflow joined the Water of Coyle near Coyle bridge. Armstrong's map of 1775 shows the loch.

The OS maps suggest that the water flow could be controlled so as to set the level of the loch. OS maps also show that the size has been greatly reduced and in 2011 only a small area of open water survives, surrounded by wetland with no significant outflow remaining. The main drain sets the present water level and the previous ditch is now infilled for part of its length with a pipe within it.

The height differential between the present outflow and the presumed natural overflow is illustrated by the 'fossilised' loch shore features. A quoted depth of 4.3 m or 14 ft for the early 19th century is reflected by this evidence. Although the old lochs outflow passes close to the site of the now demolished Bridgend Cottages, no evidence of a watermill survives.

=== Natural history of the site ===
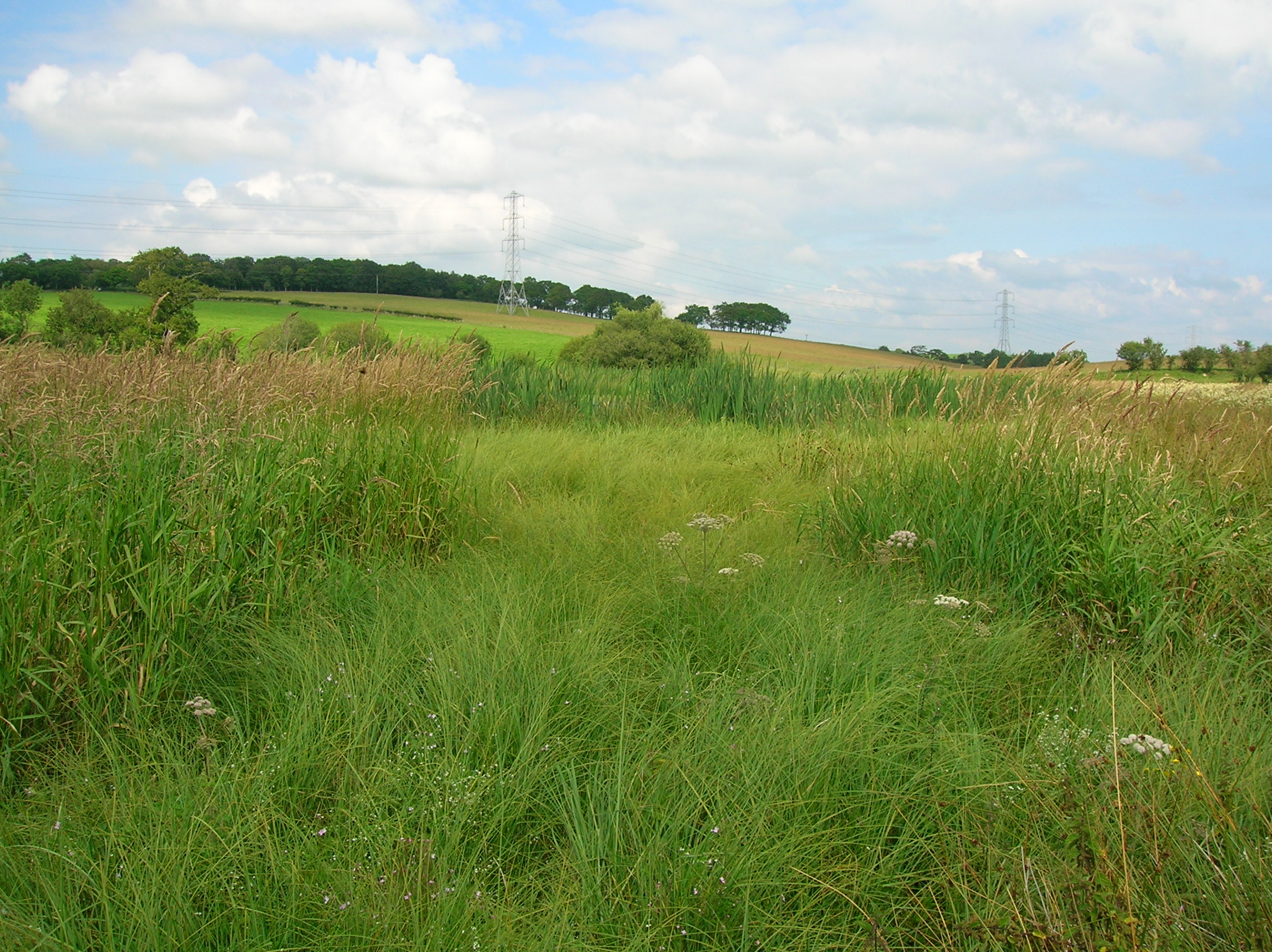
Reed canary grass, wild angelica, and sedge dominated habitat at the loch margin.

The loch is eutrophic and is surrounded by a wide wetland margin that dries out progressively towards the surrounding pastures. Animals found at the site include willow warbler (Phylloscopus trochilus) are present, the European hare (Lepus europaeus), meadow brown, (Maniola jurtina), and small tortoiseshell (Aglais urticae).

Plants found include typical wetland species such as sedges, willows, and rushes. Hedge woundwort is plentiful, as are wild angelica (Angelica sylvestris) is plentiful, as are Hedge woundwort (Stachys sylvatica), yellow flag iris (Iris pseudacorus), and reed canary grass, (Phalaris arundinacea). The open water area exhibits yellow pond-lily (Nuphar lutea). Wild angelica, reedmace (bullrush), yellow meadow vetchling, Yorkshire fog grass, tussock grass, and meadowsweet were also noted and Brooklime speedwell grows within the ditch of the Joppa Burn inflow.

=== Sundrum Castle ===
The loch was not an ornamental feature of the grounds in the immediate vicinity of Sundrum Castle, however it lies quite close by. Duncan Wallace, son of Sir Robert Wallace and related to Sir William Wallace, commissioned the building of the present castle in the 1360s. The castle passed to Sir Alan de Cathcart before 1384 as Sir Duncan died without an heir. The estate remained in the hands of the Cathcart family seat until 1753, when it was sold by the 9th Lord Cathcart to John Murray of Broughton. The Hamilton family purchased it within a year, and it remained with them until 1917, when it was sold to Mr. Earnest Coats, a director of the Paisley firm of thread manufacturers. In 1936, Sundrum was sold to a hotel syndicate and later the castle fell into disrepair before being restored again in recent times.

== Uses ==
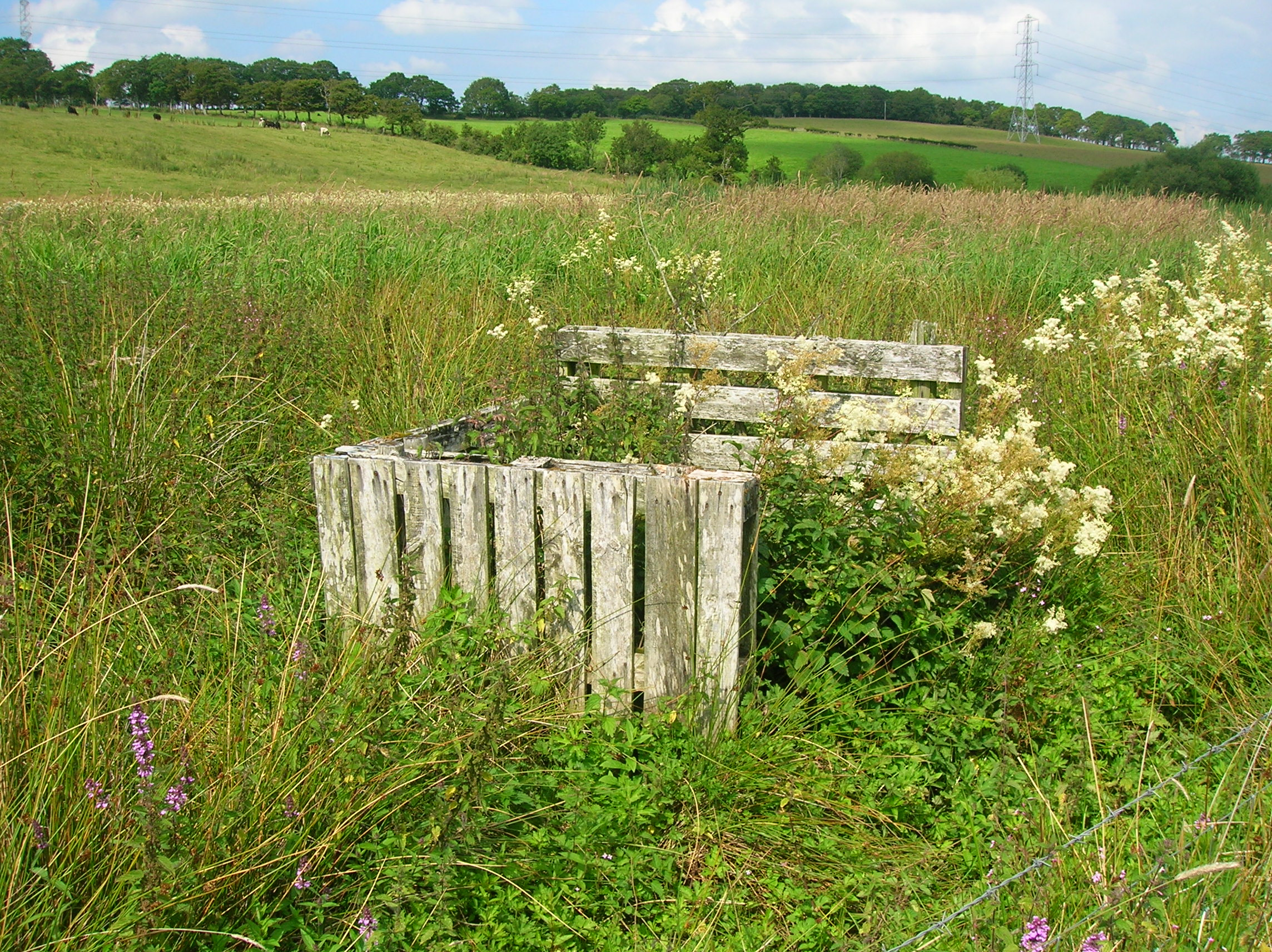
Wildfowl shooting hide or butt

In the 19th century Lochend Loch was used for curling and probably ice skating. St. Quivox v Coylton is recorded for 20 January 1820 and again on 9 January 1862, both times playing for the Coylton medal. The presence of a small island is indicative of its use for breeding and hunting wildfowl and it is likely to have been used for fishing as fish were present.

The site in 2011 had waterfowl shooting hides and feeding areas for pheasants. Light grazing was noticeable up to the fence around the open water.

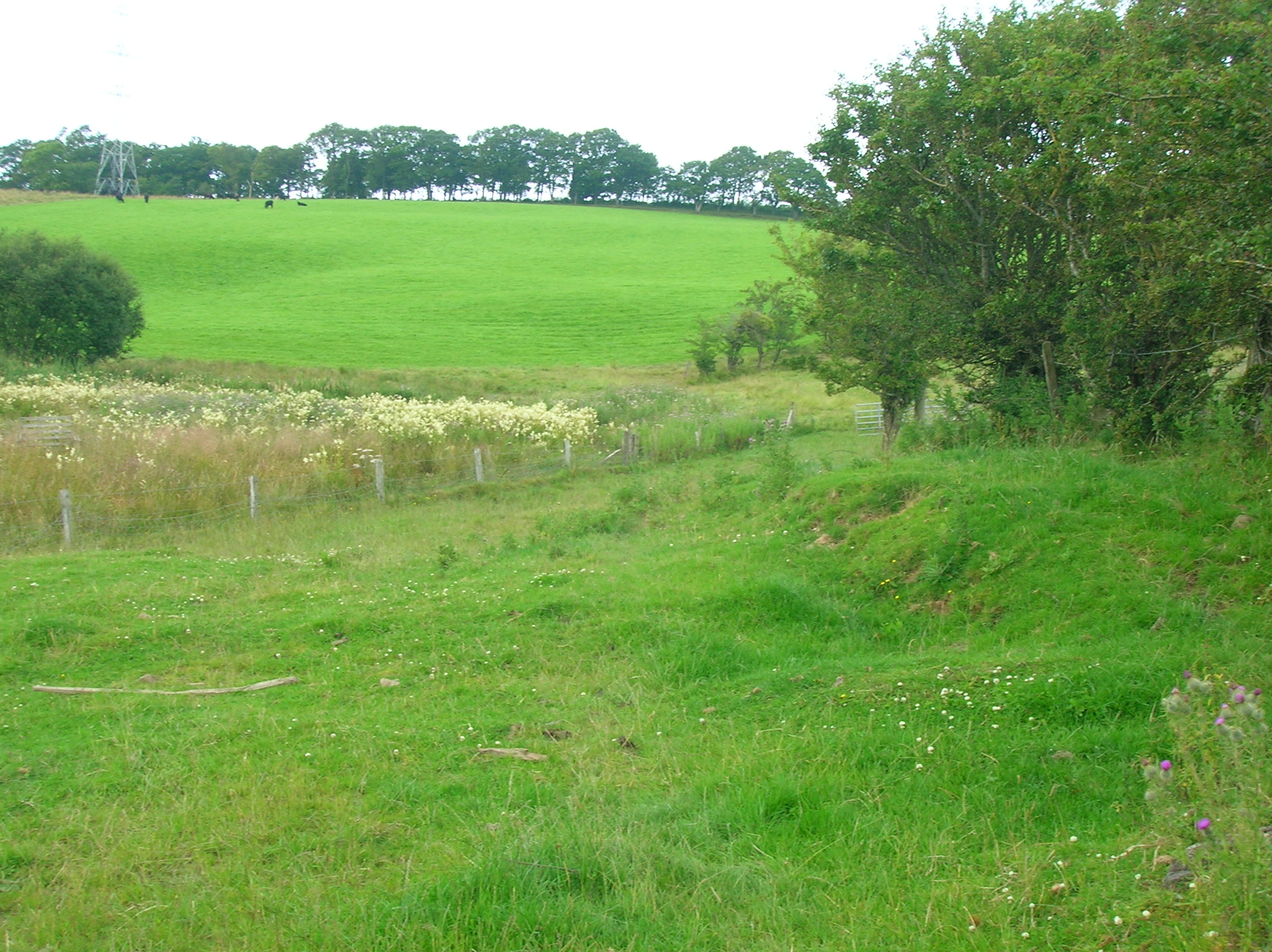
Areas of old lochshore - northern end.

== Micro history ==
The loch lay on the lands of Gallowhill Farm, part of the Sundrum Castle estate. The term gallowhill may refer to the site of the feudal barony gallows. The death sentence was hanging for men; women were drowned.

== See also ==
- Coylton
- Loch Fergus
- Lindston Loch, South Ayrshire
- Martnaham Loch
- Snipe Loch
