= Carcluie Loch =

Coordinates: 55°24′42.4″N 4°36′33.9″W

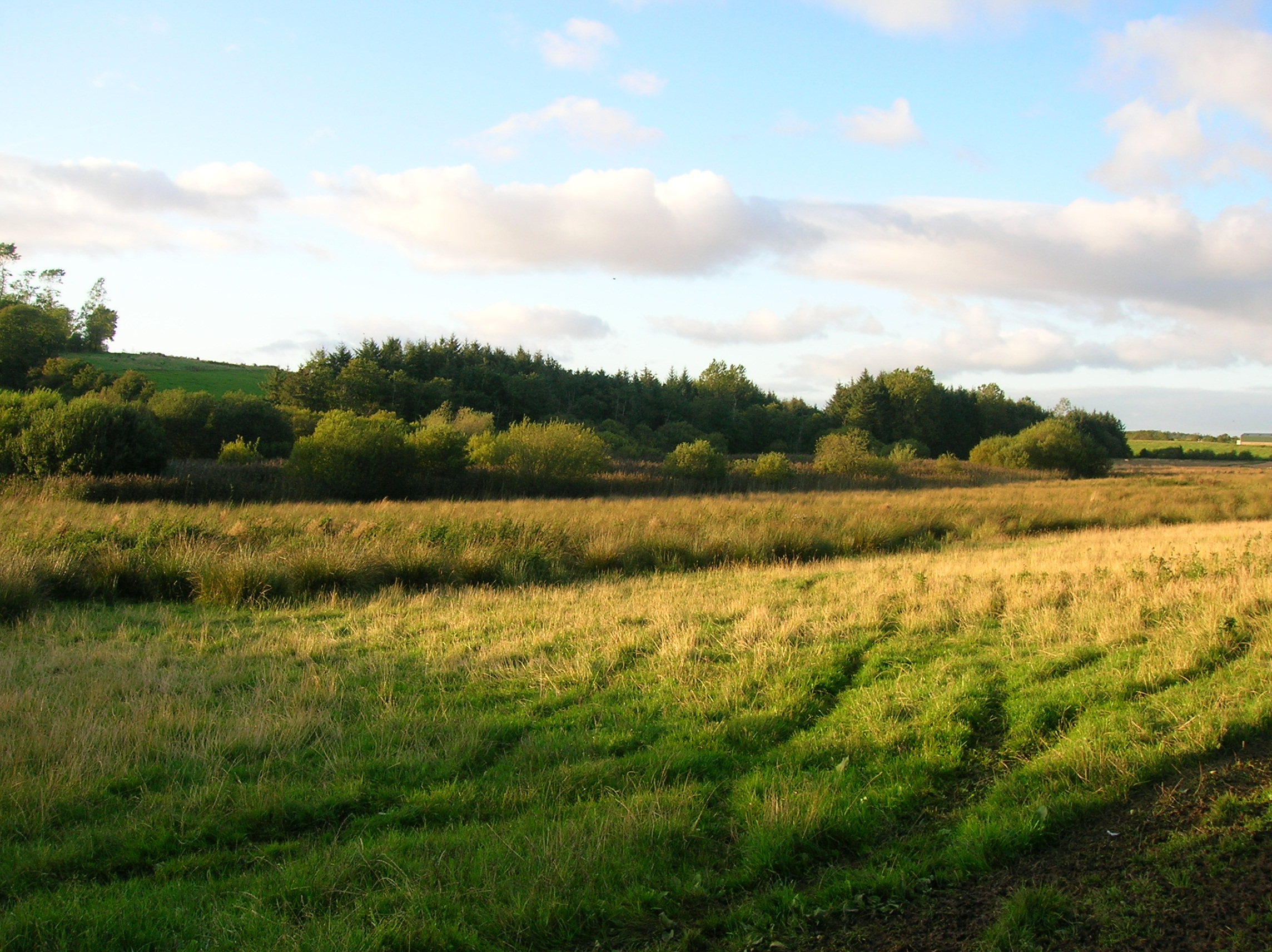
- Carcuie Loch

- The location of Carcluie Loch, East Ayrshire
- Location: Dalrymple, South Ayrshire, Scotland
- Type: Freshwater loch
- Primary inflows: Carcluie, un-named Burn, rainfall and runoff
- Primary outflows: Broomberry Burn.
- Basin countries: Scotland
- Surface area: 1.752 acres (0.709 ha)
- Average depth: Shallow
- Islands: One, a possible crannog
- Settlements: Dalrymple

Carcluie Loch (NS 34894 16186) is a small freshwater loch in the South Ayrshire Council Area, lying in a glacial Kettle Hole, Parish of Dalrymple, Scotland.

== The loch ==
Blaeu's map of circa 1654 taken from Timothy Pont's map of circa 1600 shows Loch Luy and nearby the dwelling of Kar Cluy. In 1821 the farm was recorded as Kirklewy, but no loch shown. In 1832 Thomson's map shows a small loch at Carcluie. In the 1870s, the OS map shows the loch as roughly oval in shape, covering an area of 0.709 hectares (1.752 acres). The loch is fed by the Carcluie Burn and another burn running down the hill from near the railway, with its outflow leading toward Broomberry.

=== Drainage ===
The loch's drainage may have begun in the early 18th century when Alexander Montgomerie, 10th Earl of Eglinton, was pursuing a number of agricultural improvements on his extensive estates. Further drainage work may have been carried out in the 1740s as part of improvements aimed at providing employment for Irish estate workers during the Irish potato famines of the 1740s and the mid-19th century. Many drainage schemes also date to the end of World War I, when large numbers of soldiers returned to civilian life.

=== Island ===
Smith records that the former roughly circular island within the loch, having all the appearance of a crannog once had 'pile-heads' in the water around it. A casual inspection did not reveal any supporting evidence. Smith gives the spelling as 'Carclui'. The island is no longer visible (2011), the SW end of the loch being entirely overgrown with reeds. Probing at the position of the island shown on the OS 1:10,000 map recorded that the natural deposits in this part of the loch are over 2 m deep. A 1993 investigation sees the site as possessing an island and not a crannog.

Situation

The loch was on the route of the old road from Straiton to Kirkmichael and onto Dalrymple.

== Natural history ==
Extensive areas of reeds (Phragmites sp.) are present. The site is listed on the WEBS register of the Wetlands Birds Survey scheme. The loch is a Scottish Wildlife Trust provisional wildlife site. The loch margins are dominated by rushes (Juncus sps) with willow scrub and a conifer plantation. Common house martins (Delichon urbicum) use the loch and its margins as a feeding area until late September.

== See also ==
- Loch Fergus
- Lindston Loch, South Ayrshire
- Martnaham Loch
- Snipe Loch
