= Joppa, Scotland =

Joppa, Scotland may refer to:

- Joppa, Edinburgh
- Joppa, South Ayrshire
