= Scottish feudal barony of Lochmartnaham =

The feudal barony of Lochmartnaham was a feudal barony with its caput baronium at Martnaham Castle on Martnaham Loch in Ayrshire, Scotland. The Crauford family held the barony prior to the 14th century, when the Campbells of Loudoun held the lands, followed by the Kennedys of Cassillis.
