= Lindston Loch, South Ayrshire =

Lindston Loch
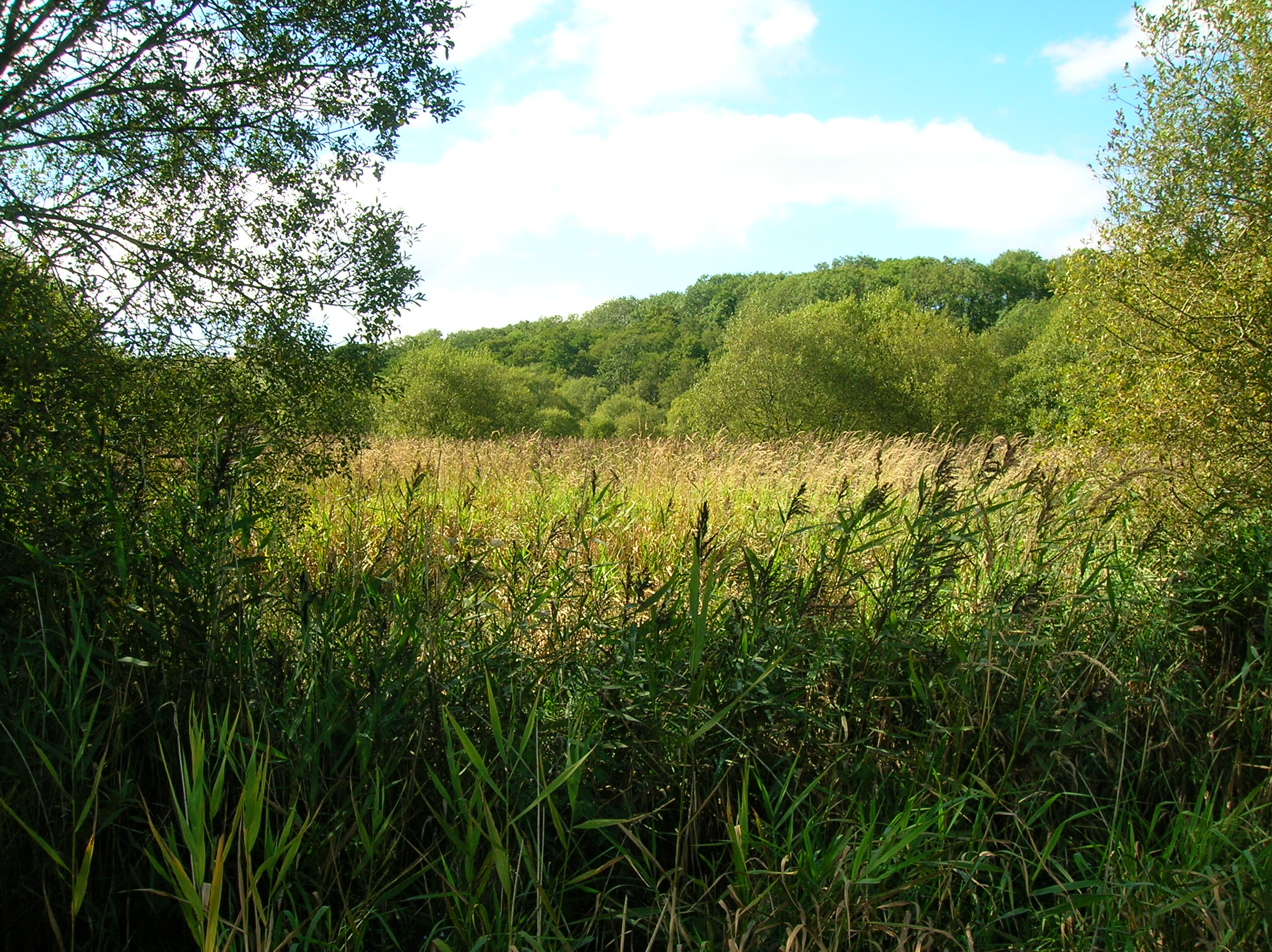
- The site of Lindston Loch

- The location of The Lindston Loch, South Ayrshire
- Location: Dalrymple, South Ayrshire, Scotland
- Coordinates: 55.413425°N 4.572797°W
- Type: Freshwater loch
- Primary inflows: Direct rainfall, runoff, plus the Balsarroch and Boghall Burns
- Primary outflows: Dustyhall Burn that joins the Purclewan Burn.
- Basin countries: Scotland
- Max. length: 200 yards (180 m)
- Max. width: 100 yards (91 m)
- Surface area: 2.78 acres (1.13 ha)
- Average depth: Shallow
- Settlements: Dalrymple

Lindston Loch (NS 373162) was a small freshwater loch situated within a glacial 'kettle hole.' The loch lies in the South Ayrshire Council Area, Parish of Dalrymple, Scotland.

== The loch ==
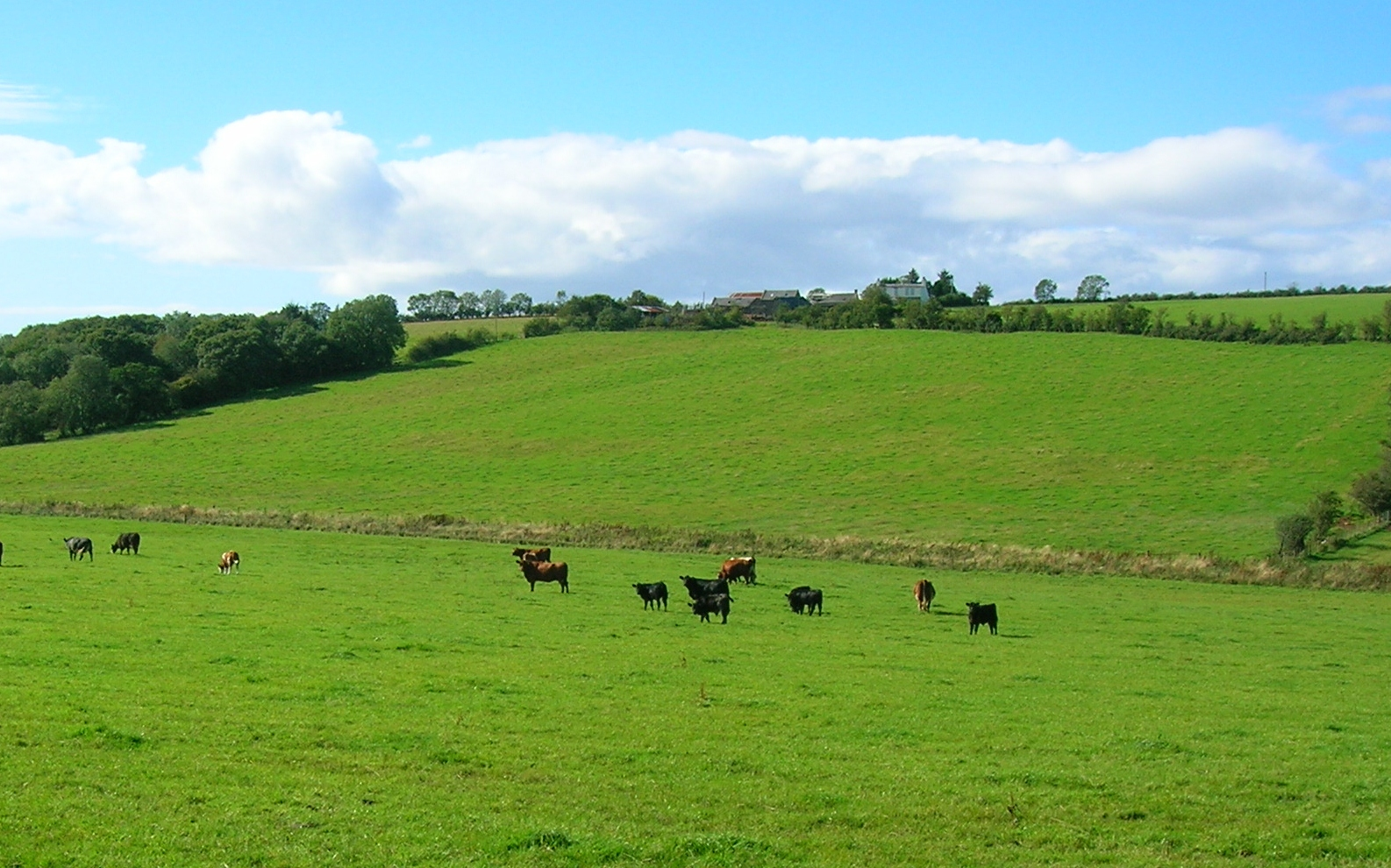
Lindston Farm, plantation and feeder burn.

In the 1870s an Ordnance Survey map shows that the loch was around 200 yards (180 metres) long by 100 yards (90 metres) wide, roughly oval in shape, with an area of about 1.125 ha or 2.78 acres; however a section to the south-west had been infilled, possibly with quarrying waste from the nearby abandoned quarries. The loch was fed by burns running down from near Boghall and Balsarroch.

=== Drainage ===
The loch's drainage may have begun in the 18th century when Alexander Montgomerie, 10th Earl of Eglinton, was pursuing a number of agricultural improvements on his extensive estates and other landowners followed his example. There may have been some drainage work in the 1740s as one of the improvements undertaken to provide employment for Irish estate workers during the Irish potato famines of the 1740s and the mid 19th century. Many drainage schemes also date to the end of World War I, when large numbers of soldiers returned to civilian life.

=== Uses ===
An outflow once ran down towards Dustyhall and joined the Purclewan Burn that powered the mill at Burnton. It is recorded that drainage works were carried out in 1790.

Curling matches at the loch are recorded on 15 January 1850 and on 19 December 1844. A curling pond was still recorded in the late 1890s.

== Archaeology ==
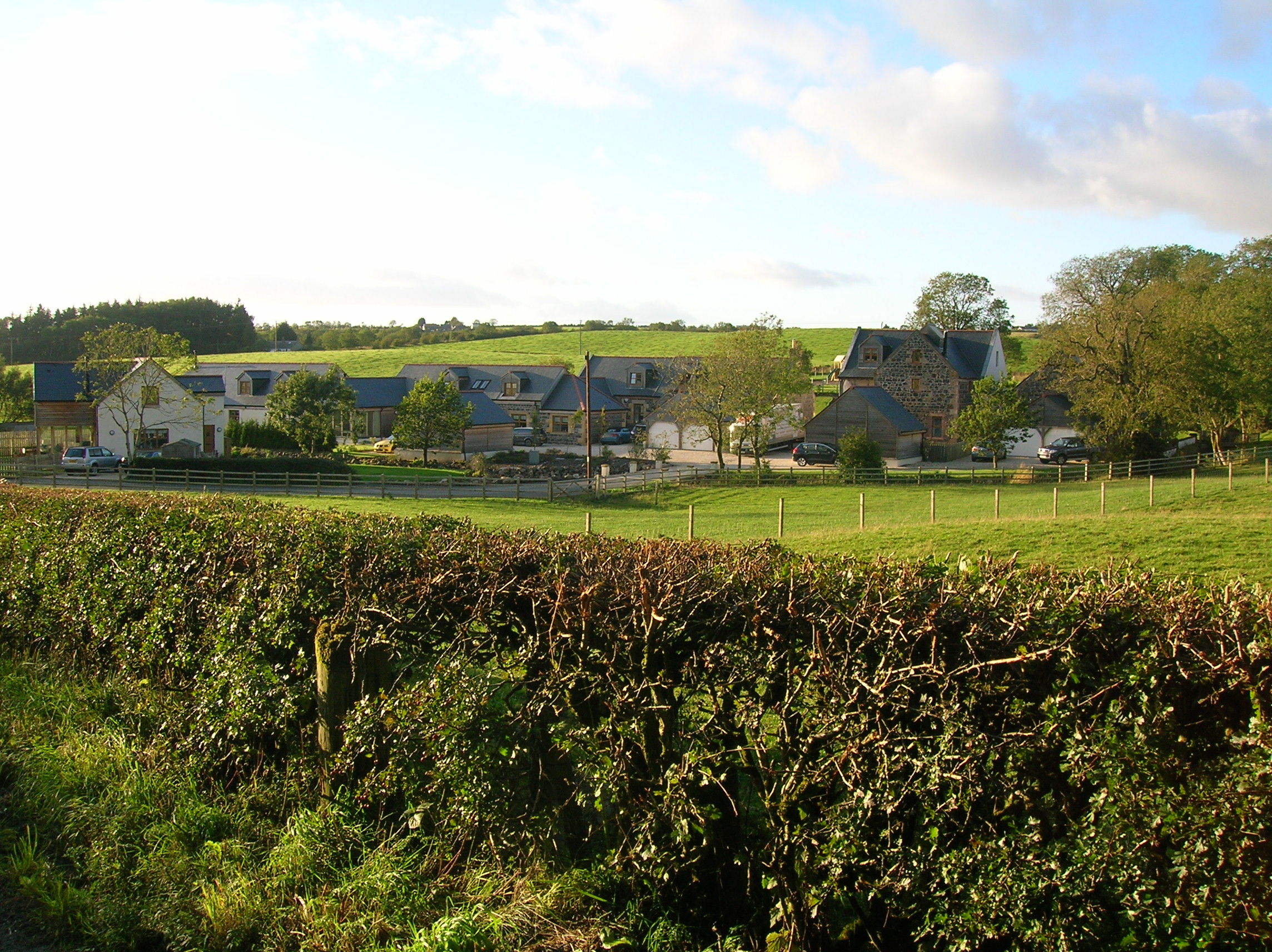
Perclewan Mill.

In 1790 Smith records that a bronze tripod ewer was found in Lindston Loch, measuring 9 5/8 inches (24 cm) high, by 3 1/4 inches (8 cm) across the mouth, spreading out to 4 1/8 inches (10.5 cm). It has a spout and a handle and is regarded as of late medieval origin; for many years it was kept at the Dalrymple Manse. A bronze tripod ewer, with spout and handle, almost identical to the Lindston Loch specimen, was found at nearby Skeldon. The old Roman road from the Solway Firth and the Clyde ran near here, passing from Causeway Farm onto Perclewan and Lindston. The above mentioned ewer was found near this road; a glazed pitcher of earthenware was found at Perclewan near the old road in 1833, bearing the figure of a man's face and hands on the front.

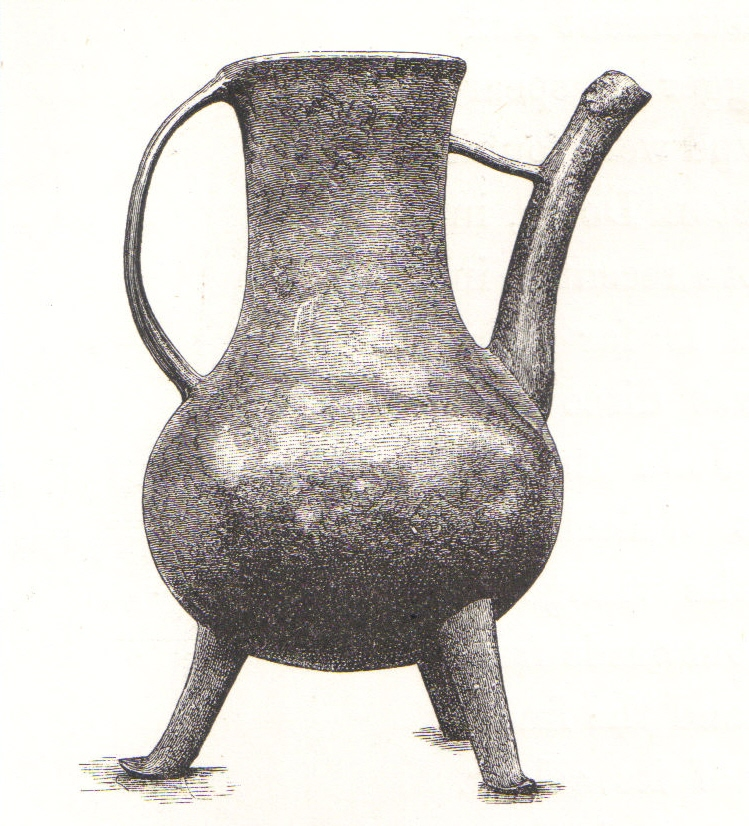
Ewer found in 1790 in Lindston Loch.

Lindston Camp sat above the loch, on the nearly level summit of a broad ridge 400 feet above the sea. A circular wet ditch, 21 feet (6.4 metres) wide and 2 or 3 feet deep to the surface of the weedy water, encloses a space 130 feet (40 metres) in diameter, scarcely rising above the surface of the surrounding field, and has no trace of a rampart. The earthwork remains may possibly been a henge commanding magnificent views in all directions. The entrance was in the east, where a causeway (7 m broad) crosses the ditch.

== Etymology ==
The name Lindston may derive from Lind, the Scots for a lime (Tilia species) or linden tree. It was also used in the general sense of woodland. The overall sense is that of a 'rocky outcrop within woodland'.

== Natural history ==
The loch in 1846 was well stocked with pike, perch, and eels, and was frequented by wild duck, teal, widgeon, and other aquatic fowl. An extensive woodland extends towards Lindston Farm, and large areas of reeds (Phragmites species) are present. The loch site is recorded as a wildlife site within South Ayrshire. The OS maps of the 1870s show a plantation beneath Lindston Farm, and extensive areas of willow scrub have developed.

== Nelly Kilpatrick ==
When Robert Burns was 15 he met his first young love, Nelly Bone, better known as Nelly Kilpatrick in this part of Ayrshire. Nelly was the daughter of the Purclewan hamlet miller and they met when William Burns hired some extra help to bring in the harvest while they were at nearby Mount Oliphant Farm. It was with Nelly in mind that he wrote his first song "Handsome Nell" –

O once I lov'd a bonnie lass,
Aye, and I love her still;
And whilst that virtue warms my breast,
I'll love my handsome Nell.

Some years later Burns wrote of this song, saying –

"I never had the least thought or inclination of turning poet till I got once heartily in love, and then rhyme and song were, in a manner, the spontaneous language of my heart. I remember I composed it in a wild enthusiasm of passion, and to this hour I never recollect it but my heart melts, and my blood sallies at the remembrance."

== See also ==
- Loch Fergus
- Martnaham Loch
- Snipe Loch
- Carcluie Loch
