= Dalrymple, East Ayrshire =

Coordinates: 55°23′50.96″N 4°35′9.72″W

Dalrymple: Scottish Gaelic: Dail a' Chruim-puill; Scots: Drumple
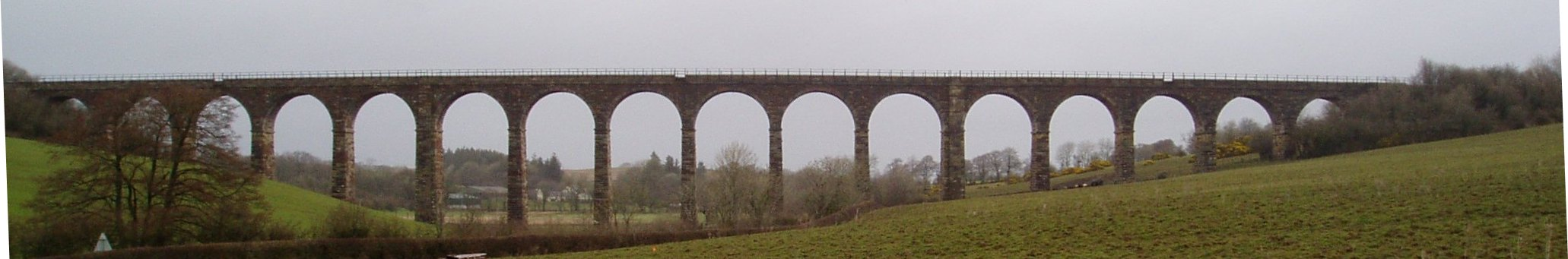
- Dalrymple Railway Viaduct to the north of the village

- Location within East Ayrshire
- Population: 1,660 (2020)
- OS grid reference: NS361146
- Council area: East Ayrshire
- Lieutenancy area: Ayrshire and Arran
- Country: Scotland
- Sovereign state: United Kingdom
- Post town: AYR
- Postcode district: KA6
- Police: Scotland
- Fire: Scottish
- Ambulance: Scottish
- UK Parliament: Ayr, Carrick and Cumnock
- Scottish Parliament: Carrick, Cumnock and Doon Valley

Dalrymple (Scots: Drumple) is a village and parish in East Ayrshire, Scotland, lying in the Doon Valley on the north bank of the River Doon. The population is around 1,347.

The name Dalrymple comes from Gaelic meaning "flat field of the crooked pool or river". The village is relatively modern, although the parish and church of Dalrymple are older. When the community was first established around 1800, there were two streets, Main Street and Garden Street. The village grew slowly until the late 20th century, when council housing was built to house families from coal-mining villages in the area that were suffering an economic decline.

It has about 1,000 houses. There are two pubs, The Kirkton Inn; a hotel with self-catering studios, a restaurant, a hairdresser, shops, a chemist, as well as a primary school. The village is in the catchment area for high schools in Ayr, Maybole and Dalmellington. Ayr is six miles (ten kilometres) north of Dalrymple by road.

The River Doon remains the boundary of the village on the southern end, and Purclewan Burn to the west and north.

Newer housing developments have tended to be on the eastern side of the village.

By the mid-20th century most of the housing had been built by the local Council. However, starting in the 1980s, many houses were purchased by their occupants and more recently, all new developments have been private.

The older part of the Village (Garden Street, Main Street and surrounding streets) is affectionately referred to as the 'bottom end' (of the village) by the inhabitants of Dalrymple and the newer part is called the 'top end'.

== See also ==
- Martnaham Loch
- Minishant
