= Joppa, South Ayrshire =

Coordinates: 55.443°N 4.513°W

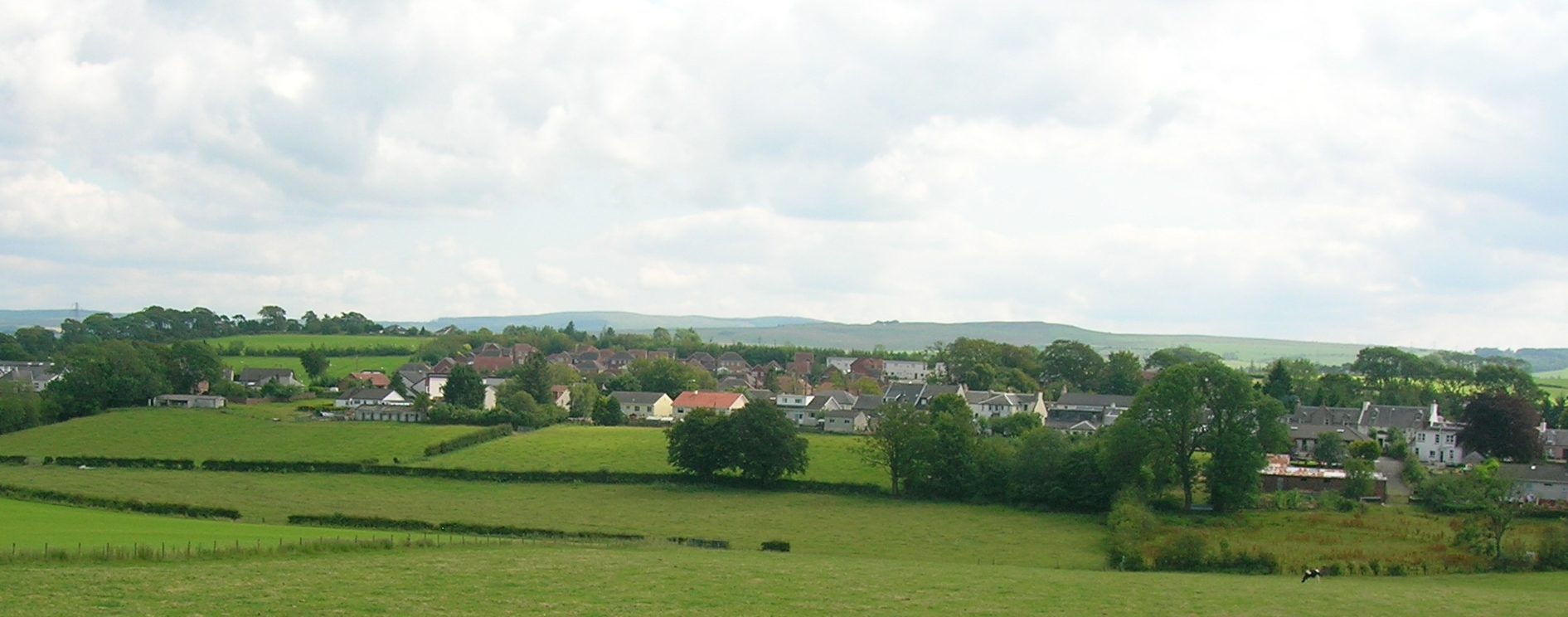
View of Joppa from Gallowhill Farm

Joppa is a former hamlet in South Ayrshire, Scotland, about one mile (1.5 kilometres) which now forms the eastern portion of the built-up part of Coylton, situated about one mile (1.5 kilometres) east of Belston, on the A70 road.

Its houses stood in isolation – with the separate hamlets then known as 'Coylton' (nowadays Low Coylton, with little more than a farm, the Coylton Arms pub and the old church cemetery) situated to the south-east, and 'New Coylton' (now referred to as Hillhead, including the replacement parish church) further to the east along the main road – until the mid 20th century, when housebuilding immediately to the north-west in the Arthurston area of the parish led to Joppa becoming part of an expanding Coylton locality from then on.

Footballer Archie Hunter was born in Joppa in 1859.

Lochend Loch lies above Joppa near to Lochend Farm and Gallowhill.
