= Lochspouts =

Coordinates: 55°18′58.3″N 4°41′55.0″W

Lochspouts Loch
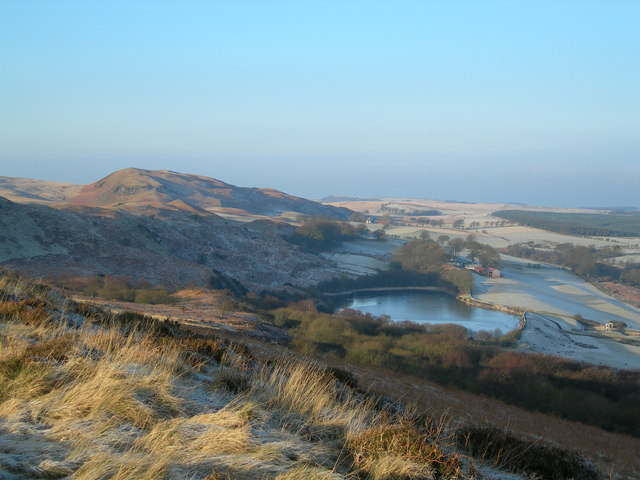
- Lochspouts from Craigfin Hill

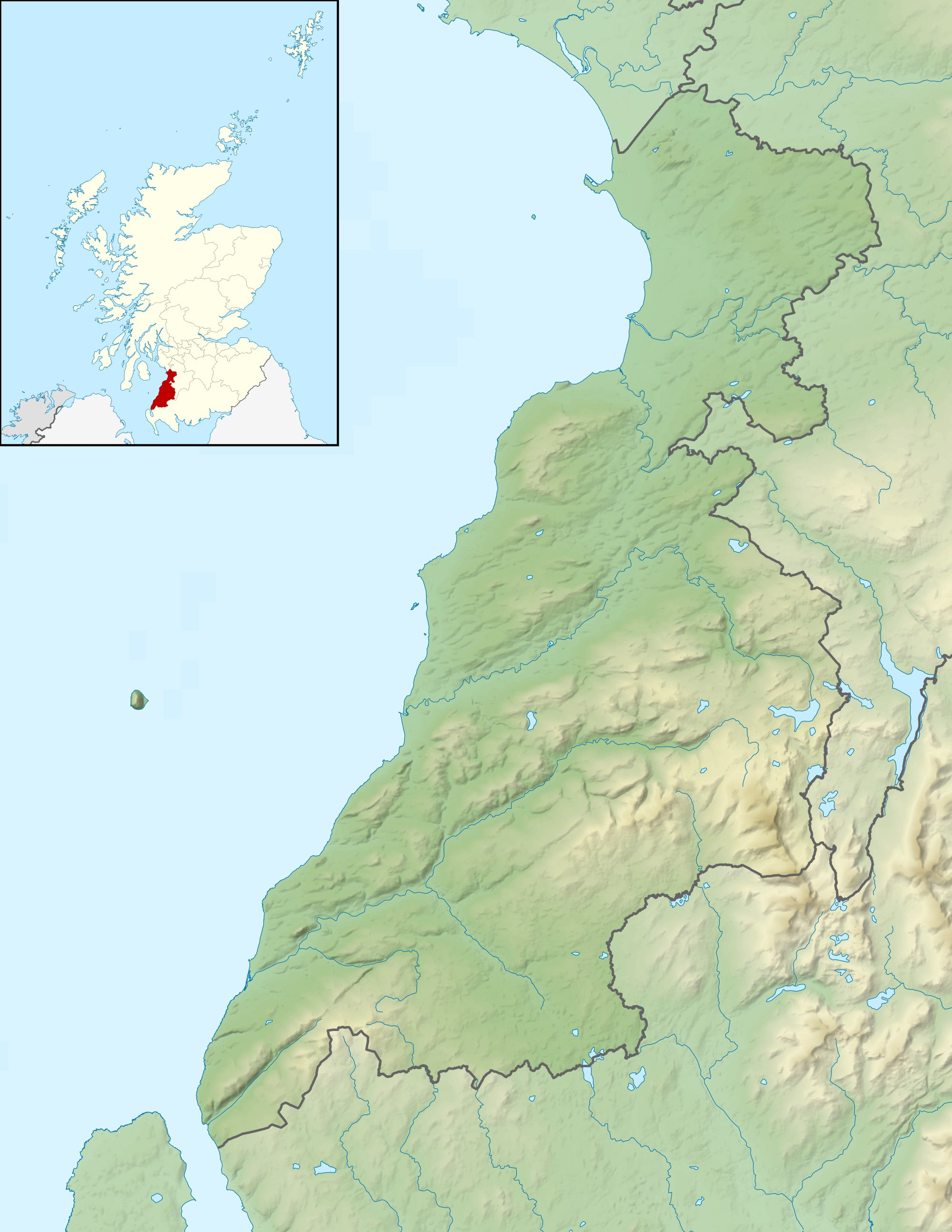
- Location within South Ayrshire
- Location: Maybole, South Ayrshire, Scotland
- Type: Drained freshwater loch
- Primary inflows: Pisga and Greentop Burns
- Primary outflows: overflow into the Ghaist Glen Burn
- Basin countries: Scotland
- Max. length: 400 m (1,300 ft)
- Max. width: 100 m (330 ft)
- Surface area: 8 acres (3.2 ha)
- Average depth: Shallow
- Islands: One crannog
- Settlements: Maybole

Lochspouts Loch (NS 2885 0586) or Lochspouts was situated in a hollow, surrounded by hilly ground on three sides and bounded by a narrow trap dyke to the north. The land was once held by the Ferguson family of Kilkerran and lies in the Parish of Kirkoswald, South Ayrshire, Scotland. The loch became a reservoir in the 19th century.

== History ==
This roughly oval-shaped loch was about three miles (five kilometres) southwest of Maybole. The natural trap dike dam that held back its waters was the only possible outflow, and several crevices in this barrier allowed excess water to escape so that during times of heavy rainfall several of these "spouts" carried water at the same time, hence "Lochspouts". The main exit was deepened to provide a water supply for a waulkmill, and this significantly lowered the level of the water, exposing the remnants of a crannog.

== The Crannog ==
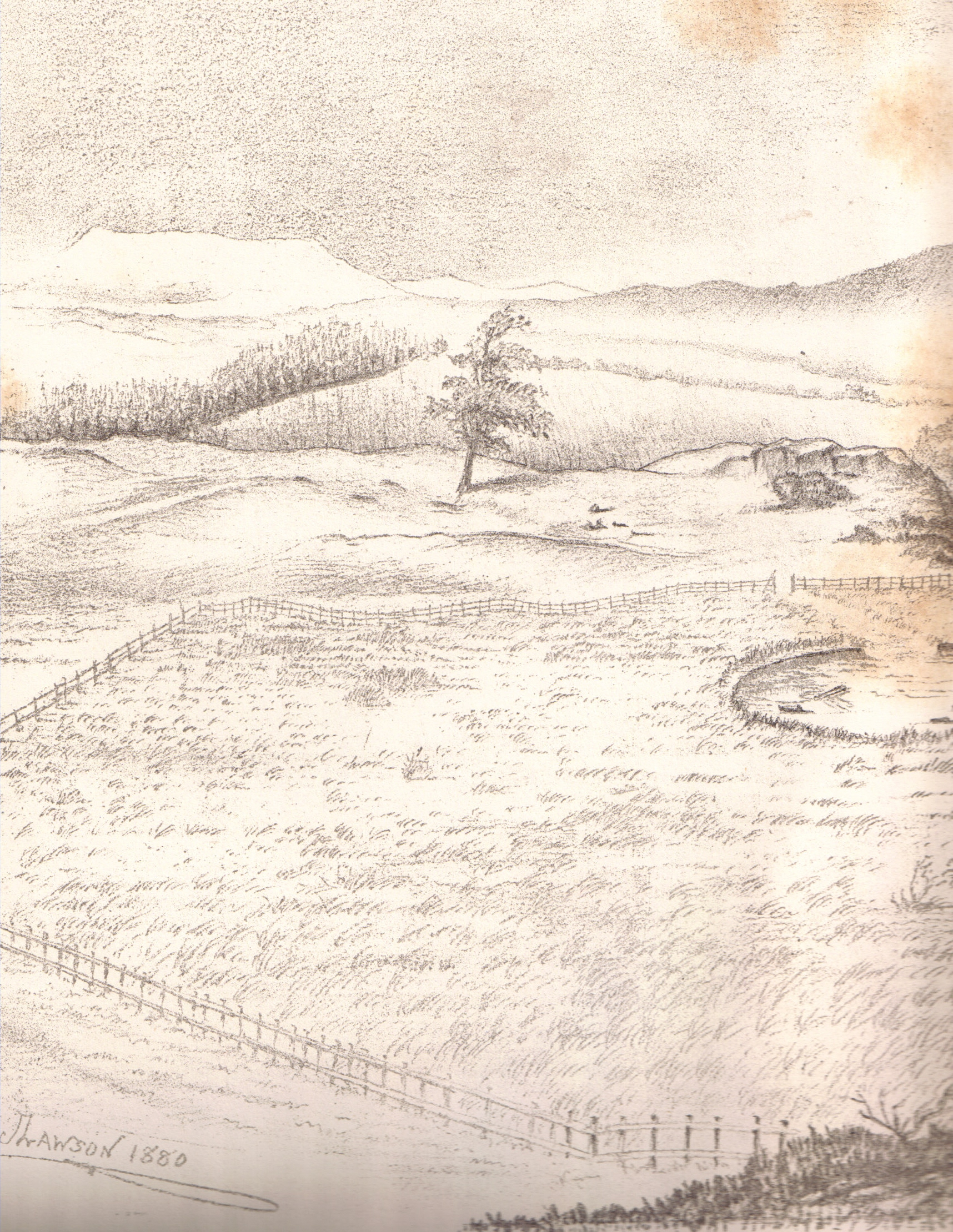
The site of the loch and crannog in 1882

As stated, sometime prior to 1879 the water level was lowered and a crannog was exposed within the loch that was now reduced to around 2 acres (0.8 hectares) only. Dr R. Munro partly excavated the site in 1880 and it was shown to be of wood, around 95 feet (29 metres) in internal diameter, with a raised walkway running to the shore. Mainly Roman-Iron Age date finds were discovered, along with some Medieval pottery and other artifacts. All the items found were donated to the National Museum of Antiquities of Scotland (Acc Nos: HW 1-41), including Roman finds such as a melon bead, fragments of second-century Samian pottery, Romano-Celtic bronze dress-fasteners and possibly iron; other artifacts were made of stone, bone, deer horn, jet, and bronze.

Logboat

About 1875 a logboat was found by Macfadzean during drainage operations on Lochspouts Farm. The boat does not survive and the exact location of the discovery and its relationship to the better-known Lochspouts crannog were not recorded.

=== Usage ===
Waulkmill

James MacFadzean records in 1879 that the outflow of the loch was deepened so as to supply a greater flow to a waulkmill at nearby Knockmill. No substantial remains survive of this mill.

Reservoir

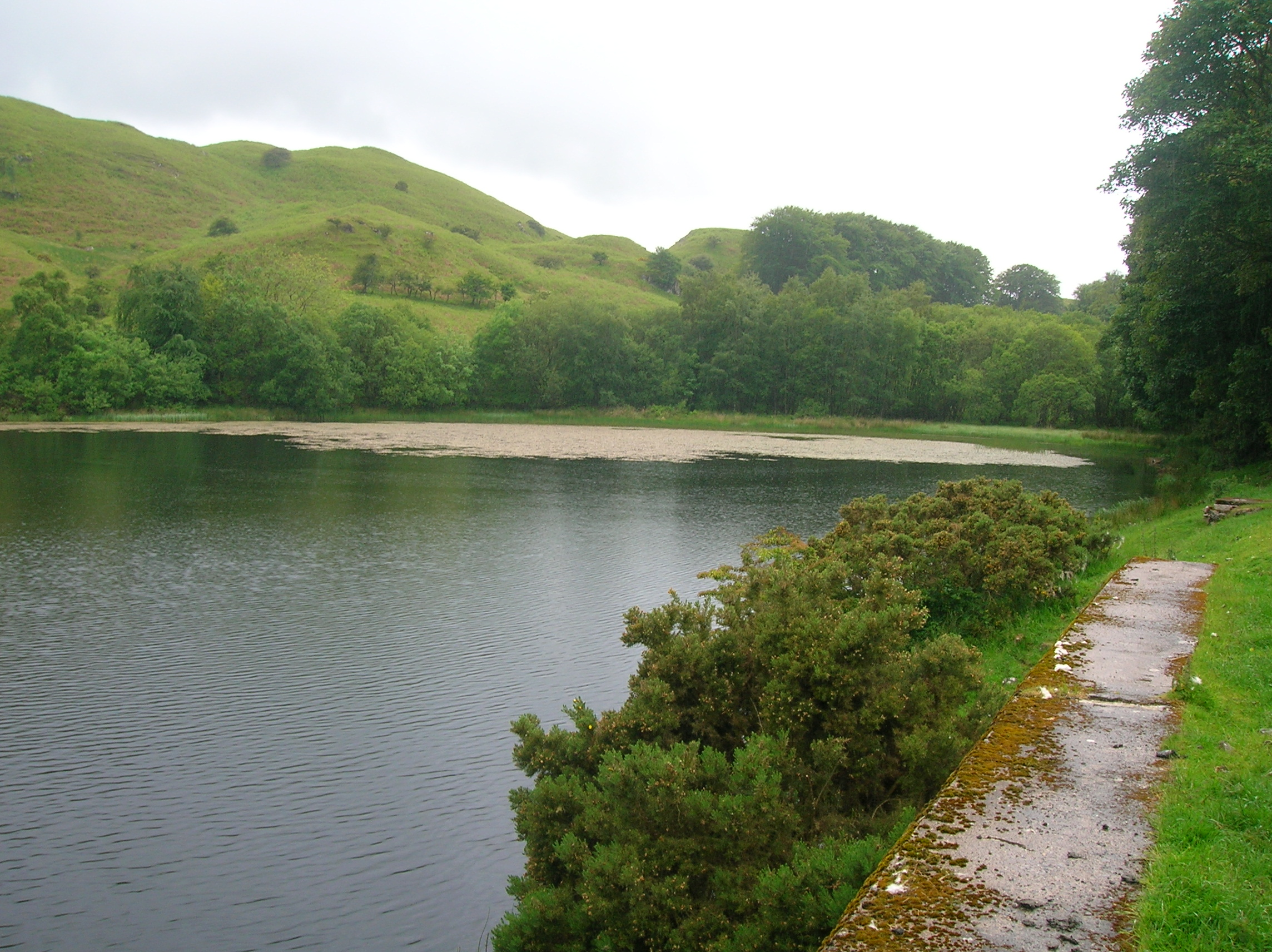
The East end of the old reservoir.

Reservoir construction to provide a water supply for Maybole began here in 1882 largely removing Dr Munro's excavated levels of 1880, however construction revealed finds of amber, bronze, jet. The Maybole Historical Society visited the Lochspouts site in 2003, following its partial drainage, and found only a small area of water remaining. A later visit showed higher water levels. Rumours of its future use as an infill site were current at the time. In June 2011 the reservoir was full and overflowing down the spillway.

A recorded comment on the water of the old loch is "Lochspouts is a' richt for washing claes, but gie me the Weiltrees when I'm drouthy". In October 1933, Lochspouts dried up and once again the townsfolk had to draw water from the towns old wells and boys went around the town selling water at fourpence per pail.

=== Cartographic evidence ===
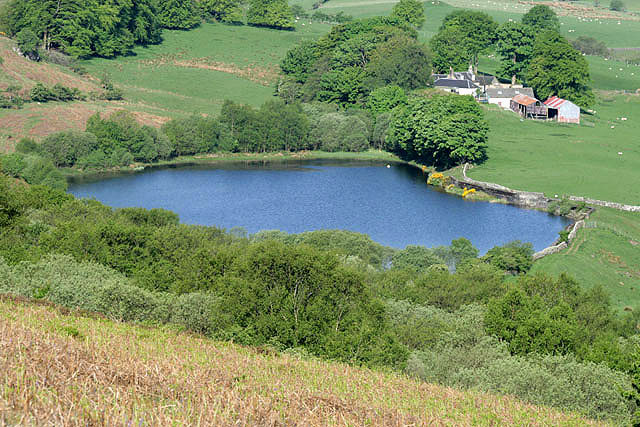
Lochspouts Loch and farm

Thomson map of 1832 records Lochspouts. The 19th century Ordnance Survey maps show the site clearly. and an inflow from the two minor burns, the Pisga and the Greentop, exiting to run down to the Ghaist Glen Burn via a single burn. The 1854-9 6 inch OS map refers to the site as Lochspouts Pond.

Previous location of Lochspouts, South Ayrshire

== Micro-history ==
A possible oval-shaped cairn is situated near the Lochspouts farmhouse; measuring 9m by 7.2m and 0.5m in height.

Two stone axes are said to have been found at Lochspouts (NS 285 058) and these were donated to the National Museum of Antiquities of Scotland in 1978-9 by the Marquess of Ailsa.

The loch is a WEBS (Wetland Bird Survey) site.
