= Loch Fergus =

Coordinates: 55°25′53.7″N 4°32′27.1″W

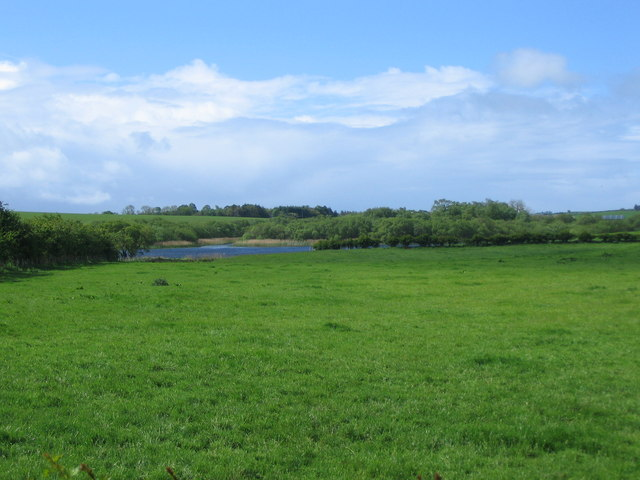
- Loch Fergus

- The location of Loch Fergus, South Ayrshire
- Location: Coylton, South Ayrshire, Scotland
- Type: Freshwater loch
- Primary inflows: Knocksoul Burn, rainwater and field drainage
- Primary outflows: Loch Fergus Burn
- Basin countries: Scotland
- Max. length: c. 680 yd (620 m)
- Surface area: 7.044 ha (17.41 acres)
- Islands: One Island
- Settlements: Ayr

Loch Fergus (NS 3932 1823) is a freshwater post-glacial "Kettle Hole" sometimes recorded as Fergus Loch. It is quite visible and is situated in a low-lying area close to the B742 road between the farms and dwellings of Trees, Lochfergus and Bowmanston in the Parish of Ayr, South Ayrshire, Scotland. The loch lies to the north of Martnaham Loch, four miles (six kilometres) east-southeast of Ayr. It drains to the southwest into the Snipe Loch.

== History ==
The ground running towards Mossend Farm is marshy and prone to extensive flooding, indicating the previous extent of the loch. The outflow is a drain and once higher water levels are illustrated by physical indications of the once higher loch margins. In the work titled A Summary of the Character of Scotland dated 1624 it is stated that Loch Fergus, with an isle with many growing trees, where a great quantity of heron resort with the loch seal. There is a decayed monastery in it.

Loch Fergus is mentioned in the charter of the Burgh of Ayr from King William in 1205, when the boundary of the burgh is delineated.

=== King Fergus ===
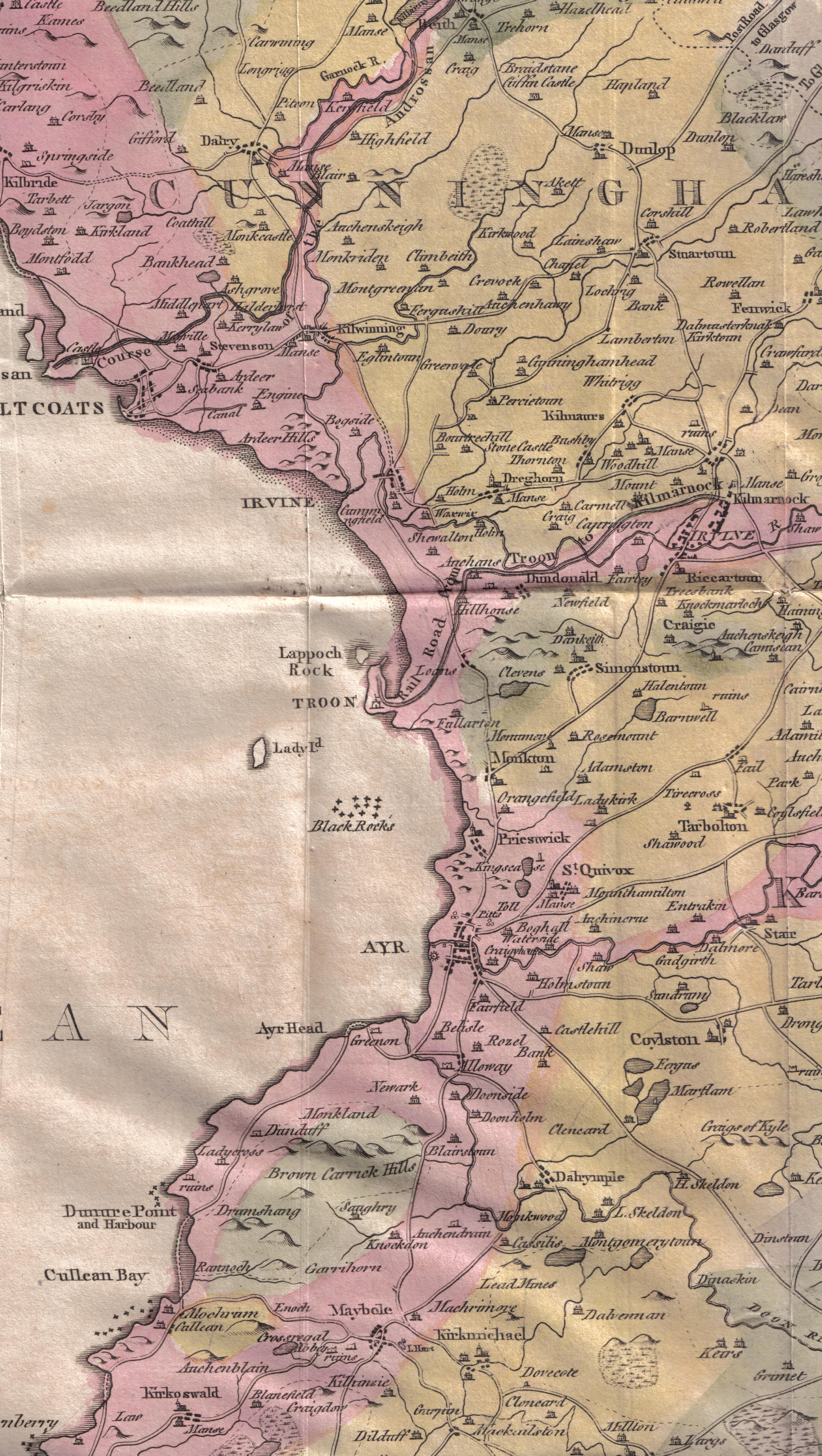
1811 Map of Ayrshire with Lochs Fergus, Snipe and Martnaham.

Tradition states that the name is derived from King Fergus, one of the Scottish kings who defeated King Cole or Coilus, king of the Britons, in the adjoining fields. The story goes that King Cole and his army were encamped in the vicinity of Loch Fergus and King Fergus attacked them at night, taking advantage of their drunk and 'feasted' condition. King Cole and his defeated army escaped across the Water of Coyle, only to be caught, defeated, and the King himself killed near Failford. Campbell records that King Cole may have had a castle at Martnaham on the islet within the loch.

Paterson records that in 1628 the two merk land of Lochfergus was leased in feu-ferm to John, Lord Loudoun for 8s Scots. In the late 17th century the lands passed to the Cassillis family. In 1798 Archibald, Earl of Cassillis held the sasine of the loch lands.

The land around the loch is marshy and Lochfergus Wood has been a feature for many years, mainly located on the northwest side.

A boat house, reached by an artificial inlet, is marked on the first OS maps not far from the road, reached by an access lane branching of the nearby B742. This feature is missing from the maps by the 1890s.

=== The Island ===
The roughly oval island, around 190 yards (170 metres) long and 0.814 hectares (2 acres) in area, is said to have been reached by a causeway, no longer extant, that ran from the bank near Lochfergus Farm. Two totally formless low mounds of boulders are located on the island which may be the remains of a building. The 25-inch (640 mm) OS map indicates a small rectangular structure near the centre of the island. An anglers club-house was constructed in 1976 ten metres from the ruins. The island is covered in dense vegetation. The island is designated by the Scottish Wildlife Trust as a Local Nature Conservation Site (LNCS) and maps show that it has long been covered in woodland.

=== The Friary ===
It is recorded in the "Chronicles of Scotland" of 1624 that a friary existed on the island and Love refers to local placenames such as Abbothill and Friarland in support of this. Smith comments that the island has a number of stones scattered over it, however he suggests that this fact may have led to the friary or monastery legend and prefers the island's use as being effectively that of a crannog. The remains have also been suggested as relating to wildfowling, such as being the ruins of a duck decoy or such-like.

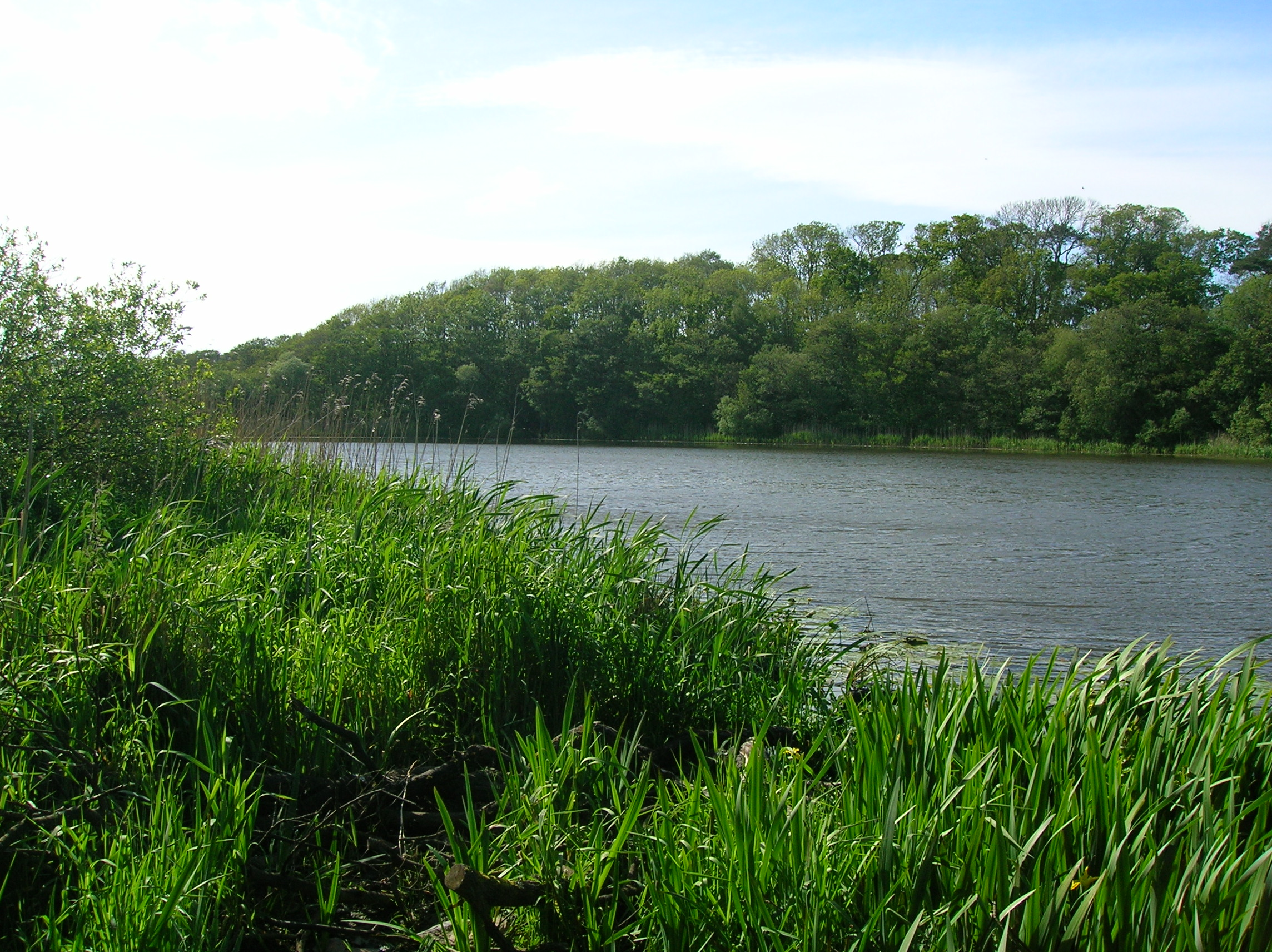
The southern end of Loch Fergus

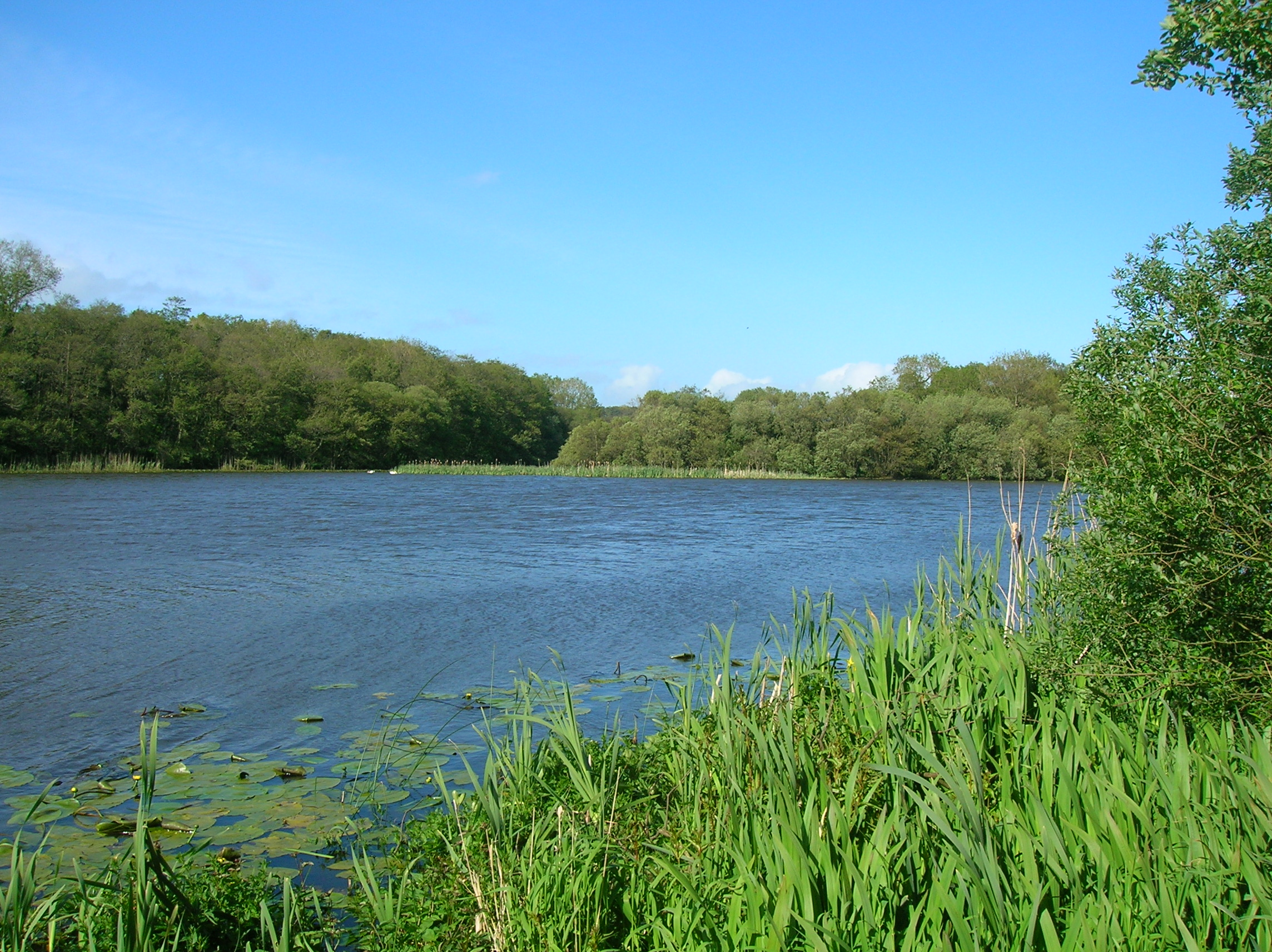
The loch and the island

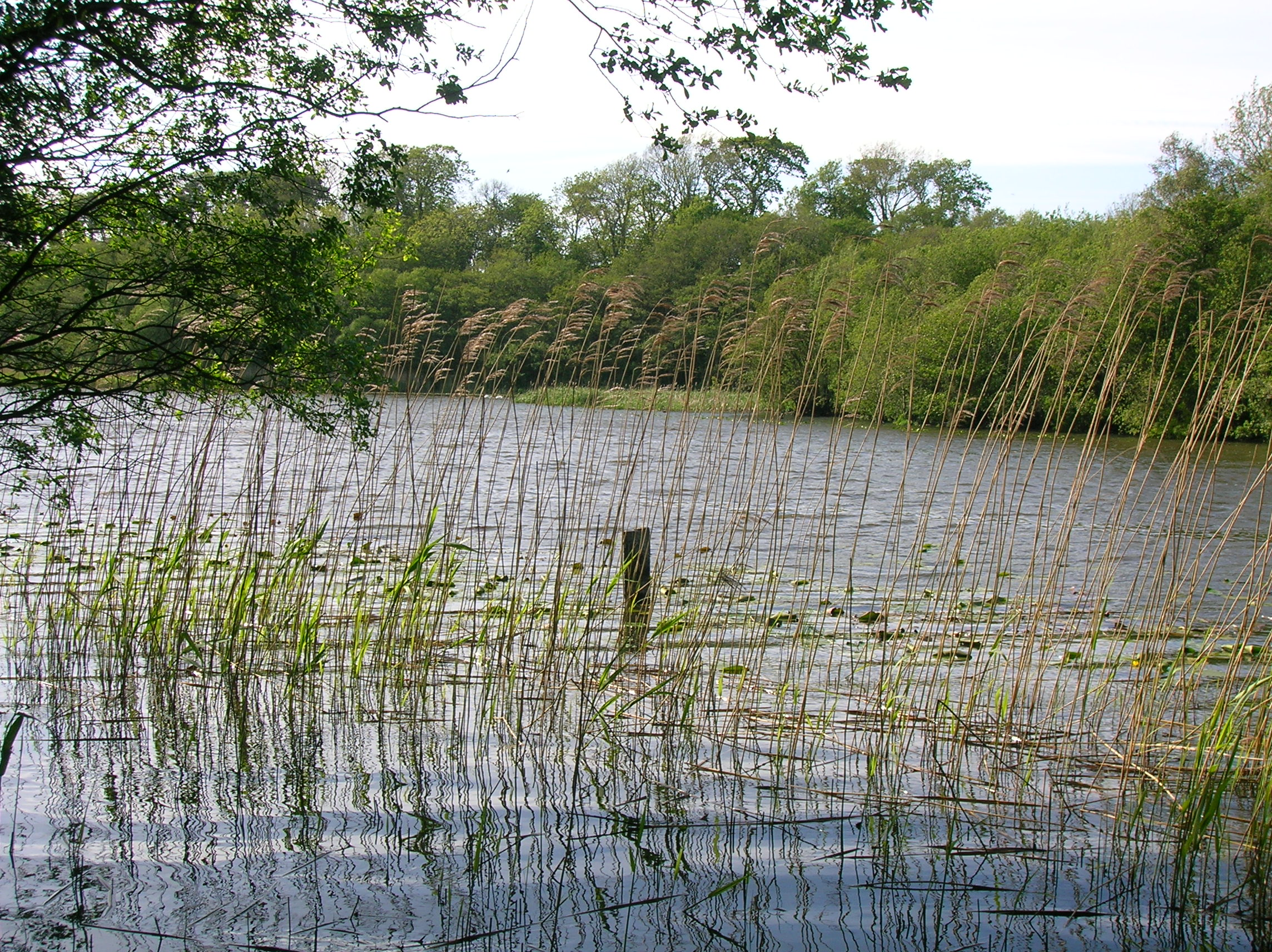
The northern end of the loch

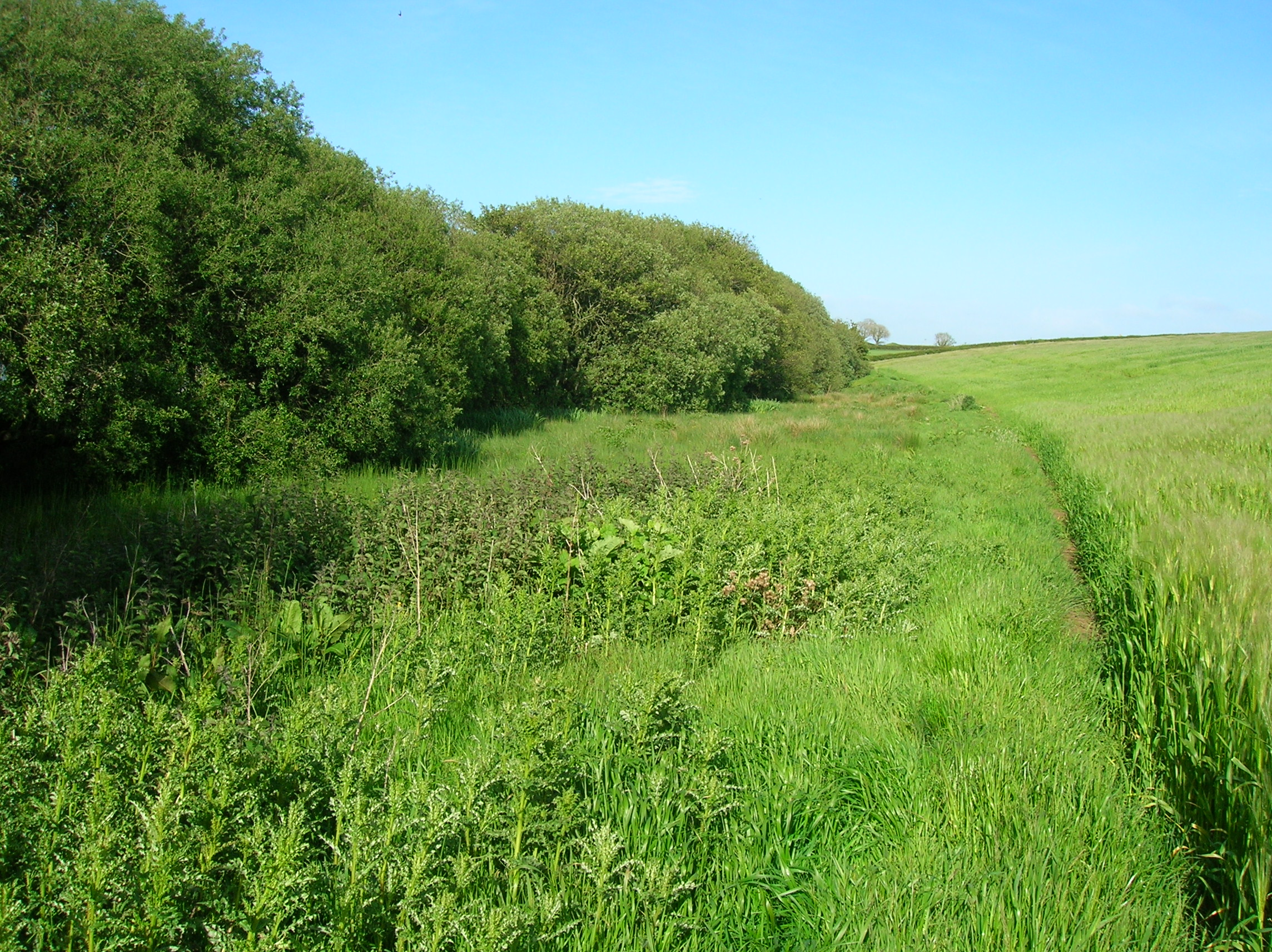
The willow woodlands on the lochshore

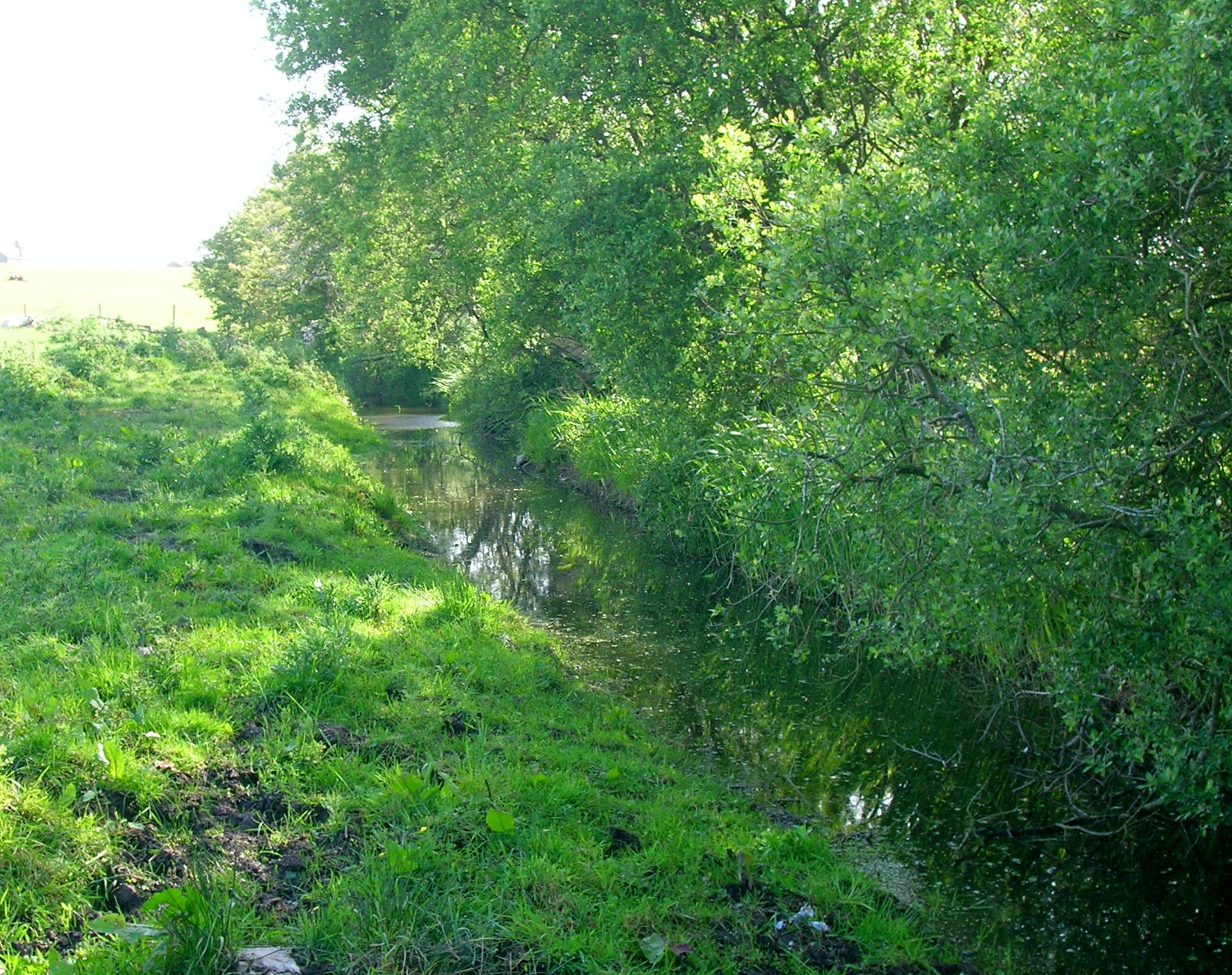
The Loch Fergus Burn outflow

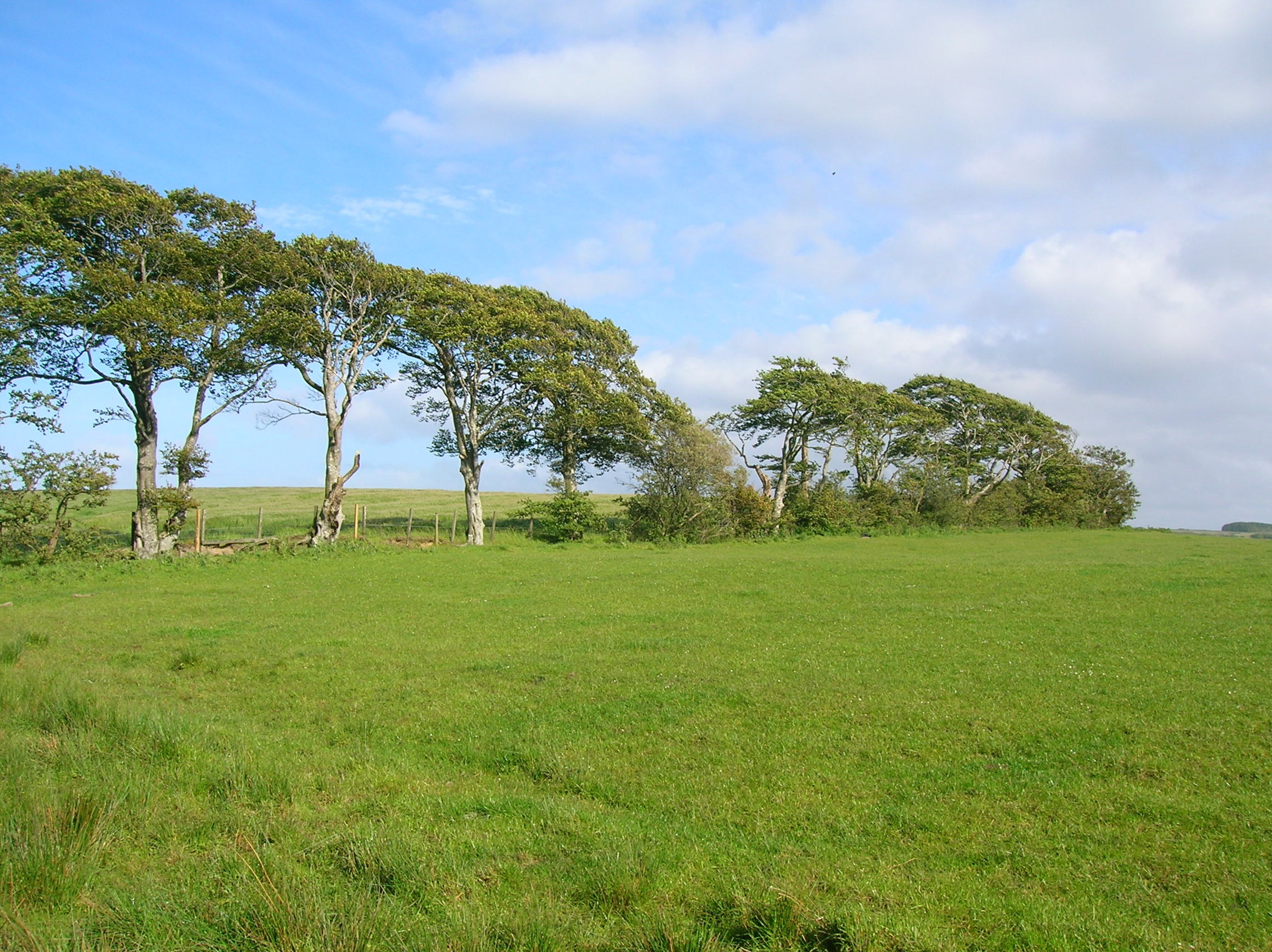
The old lane running down to the boathouse

=== The Hunting Lodge ===
Nothing now remains of the Kennedys' hunting lodge, recorded as "an old ruined castle... which probably was used as a shooting station by the Cassillis family" which is said, in 1837, to have stood near the margin of Loch Fergus near the track running off the B742. The RCAHMS designate it as a Tower House and it is not clear when it was built.

== Transport ==
An old trackway known as the "Foul Calsey" or causeway used to run from Loch Fergus past Trees, Macnairston, and Crofthead to Ayr, joining the Cumnock Road near Holmston. This road was still used up until the 1920s at harvest time. Farmers later cleared away tracks like this because they denied arable ground to them and could damage their ploughs.

== Micro-history ==
James Kennedy of Knockdon was involved in the feuds between the Campbells and the Kennedys. He was prosecuted as one of the group involved in the murder of Robert Campbell at Loch Fergus in 1528.

The fields around Loch Fergus are a good site for Whooper Swans.

Highpark or Laighpark is a roughly circular earthwork of unknown date or purpose, situated on the slopes to the northeast of the loch. It measures 45m in diameter and sits within a ditch; a break in the ditch on the east may indicate the original entrance.

Loch Fergus is a site for coarse fishing, particularly roach, pike, and perch. The loch is said to be unusually deep for a typical kettle hole.

A drained site (NX6950) near Kirkcudbright, Dumfries and Galloway, is known as Loch Fergus and the old island is said to have been the site of the castle of Fergus, a King of Galloway.

Loch Fergus was a barque of 845 tons, built at Glasgow by Henderson in 1875. On her last voyage from Glasgow to Brisbane in 1899, she went ashore during a gale, off Killiney Bay and was lost

== See also ==
- Coylton
- Martnaham Loch
- Snipe Loch
- Lindston Loch, South Ayrshire
