= Snipe Loch =

Coordinates: 55°25′25.7″N 4°33′9.2″W

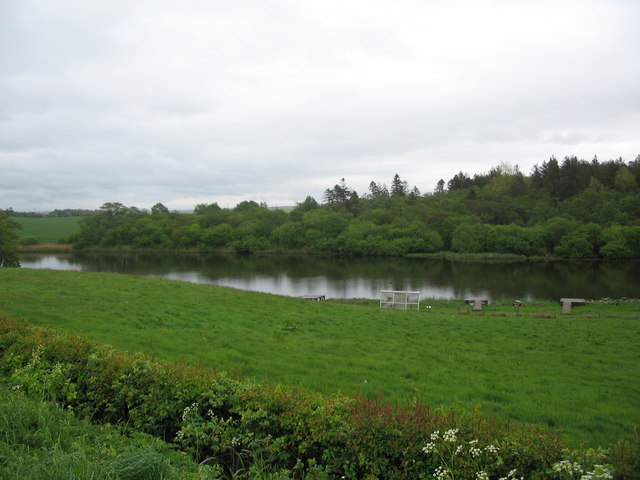
- Snipe Loch and fishing platforms

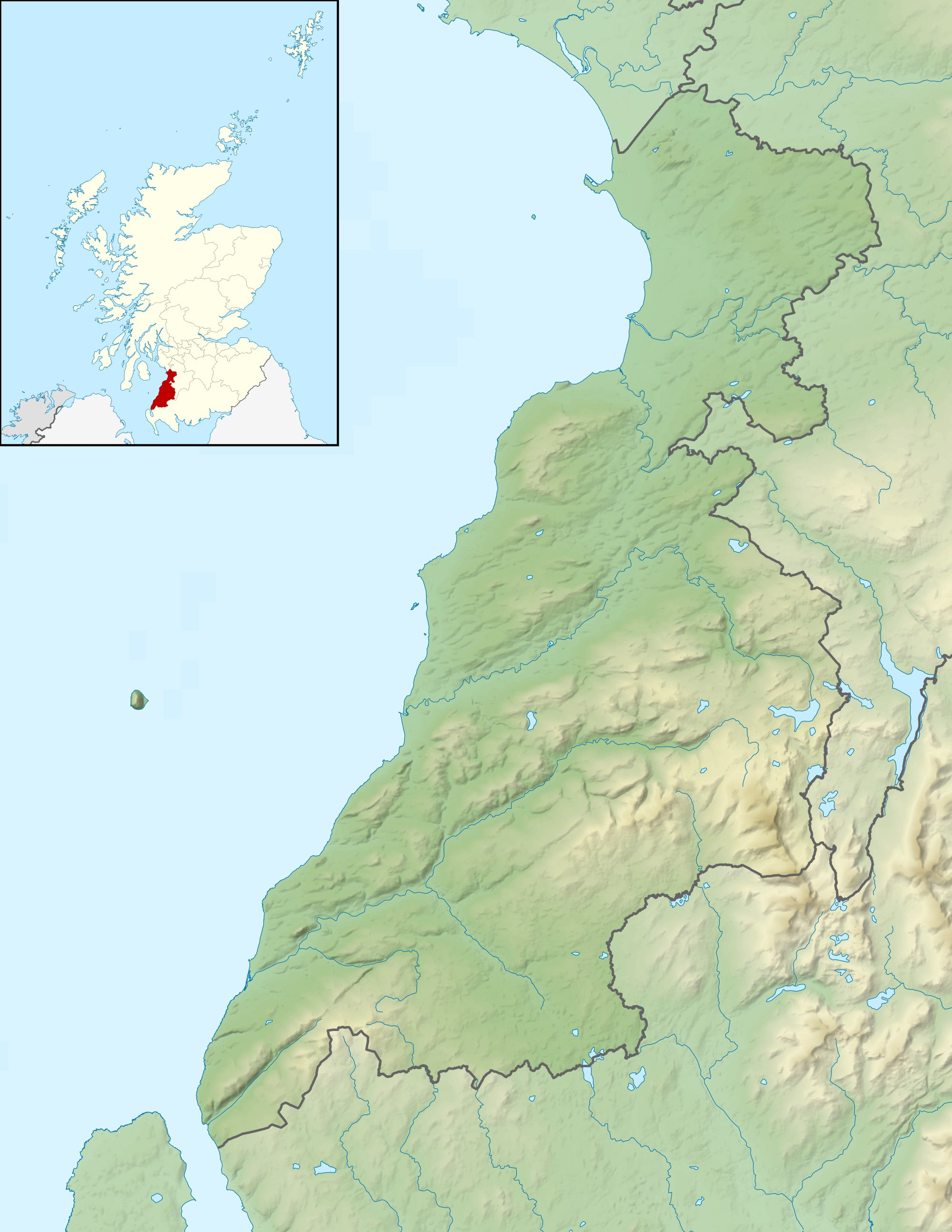
- Location within South Ayrshire
- Location: Coylton, South Ayrshire, Scotland
- Type: Freshwater loch
- Primary inflows: Loch Fergus Burn, rainwater and field drainage
- Primary outflows: Snipe Loch Burn
- Basin countries: Scotland
- Max. length: Circa 525 ft (160 m)
- Max. width: Circa 160 ft (49 m)
- Surface area: 5.77 acres (2.34 ha)
- Average depth: Shallow
- Settlements: Ayr

Snipe Loch (NS385173) or Loch Snipe is a freshwater loch. It is situated in a low-lying area close to the B742 road next to Clocaird Farm in the Parish of Coylton, East Ayrshire, Scotland. The loch lies to the north of Martnaham Loch, 5 miles (7 km) east of Ayr.

== History ==
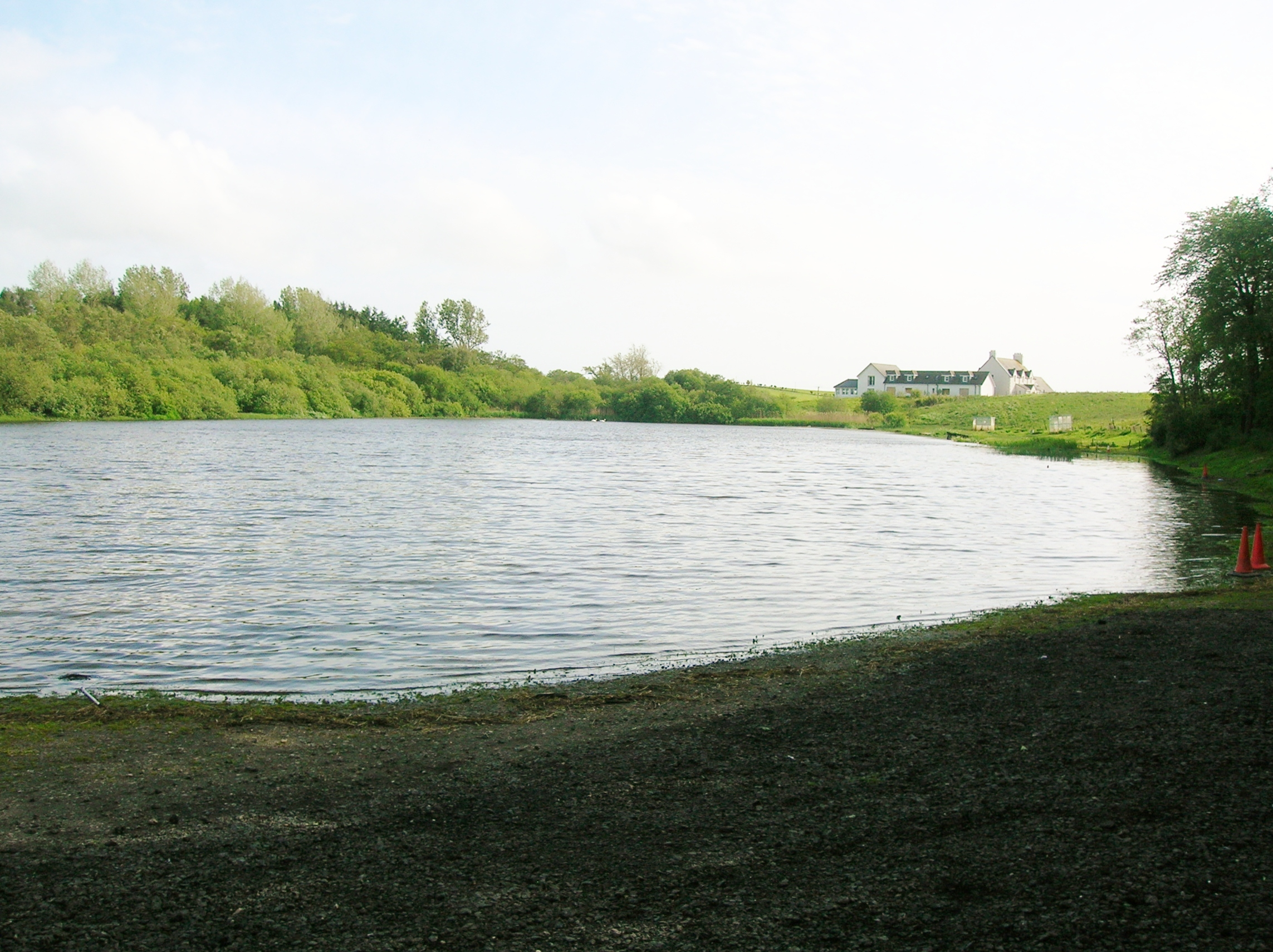
Snipe Loch and Cloncaird Farm.

Snipe Loch is a post-glacial 'Kettle Hole' fed by the outflow from Loch Fergus and its outflow running into Martnaham Loch. The early OS maps show a sluice on the outflow, allowing the water level to be controlled. The loch was fed by springs situated near the lane at Cloncaird Farm. The early OS maps show an arm of the loch running almost as far as the lane to old Glencaird (sic).

Etymology

The name could appropriately refer to the bird, snipe, Lymnocryptes minimus, however in Scots the word can refer to a featureless place, lacking significant characteristics, something long and thin, or a boggy place. In Scots the snipe is variously known as a "bluiter wheep, earn-bleater, heather-bleat, mire-snipe, or moss-bleater." Nearby Loch Fergus and Martnaham Loch are larger and have clear defining features such as castles, islands, etc.

The farm was known as Glencaird on the early OS maps and Old Glencaird id now marked as Cloncaird Cottages.

== Uses ==
The loch is a popular angling loch and is a bird watching site. It is stocked with rainbow trout and also contains perch, pike, and eels, and is frequented by wild-duck, teal, and widgeon. Nearly half of the lochshore is dominated by deciduous woodland.

The location of Snipe Loch, East Ayrshire

== See also ==
- Coylton
- Lindston Loch, South Ayrshire
- Martnaham Loch
