= Cairntable Halt railway station =

Disused railway station in Scotland

Cairntable Halt
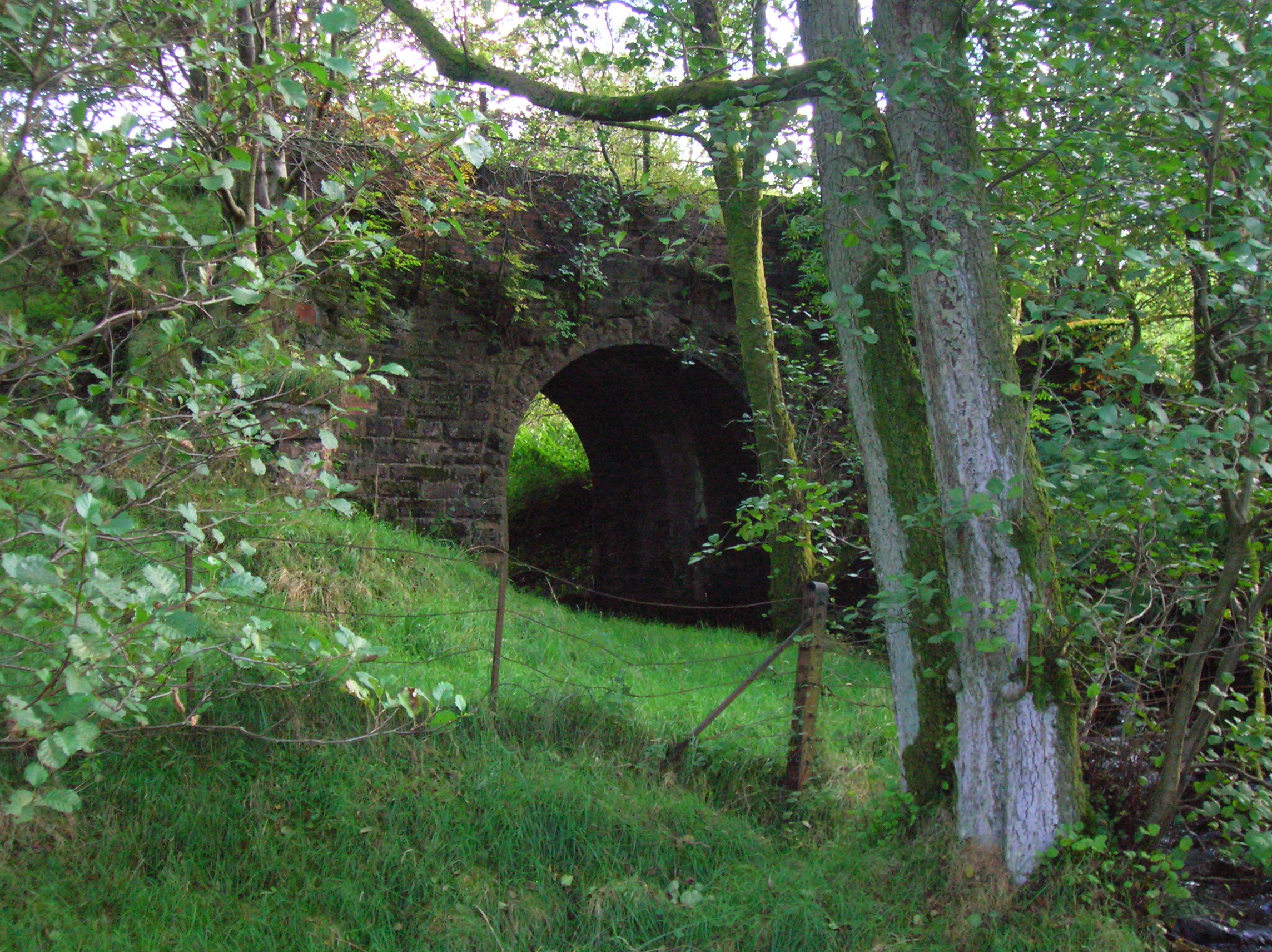
- Overbridge near Cairntable Halt's site

General information
- Location: Kerse Loch, Ayrshire; Scotland
- Coordinates: 55.3952°N 4.4761°W
- Grid reference: NS4327314042
- Platforms: 1

Other information
- Status: Disused

History
- Post-grouping: London, Midland and Scottish Railway

Key dates
- 1927: Opened
- 3 April 1950: Closed
Location

Cairntable Halt railway station was a railway station serving a rural district and the miners' row of forty-eight houses at the Cairntable Terraces, East Ayrshire, Scotland. The station was opened as late as circa 1928 by the London, Midland and Scottish Railway on the Holehouse Junction to Rankinston line.

== History ==
This basic halt opened in 1927 or on 24 September 1928 and closed on 3 April 1950. The nearby miners’ row was owned by the Cairntable Coal Co. and provided homes for workers at their nearby colliery.

== The site today ==
In 2012 the site has no remnants of the halt or trackbed and the Cairntable miners rows of forty-eight apartment houses built in 1914 no longer exist, the last inhabitant having left in 1963. There is a remembrance stone laid on the site of the former village.

== Micro-history ==
The trains would deliver bread for the village shop when the snows were too bad for the delivery van.

In 1947 a steam engine got stuck in one of the railway cuttings near the village and the men from the village and Littlemill Pit helped dig the train out of the snowdrift.

Preceding station	Historical railways	Following station
Holehouse Junction; Line and station closed	London, Midland and Scottish Railway; Holehouse Branch	Rankinston; Line and station closed
