= Weston Bridge Halt railway station =

Railway station in South Ayrshire, Scotland

Coordinates: 55.4810°N 4.5168°W

Weston Bridge Halt
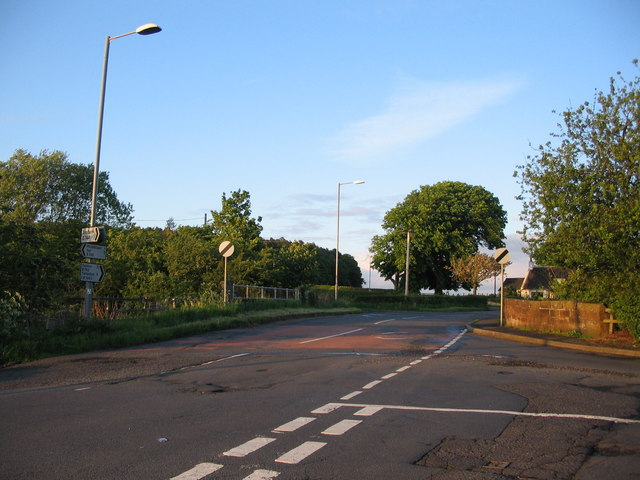
- The Weston Bridge and the site of the old access to the station

General information
- Location: Annbank, South Ayrshire; Scotland
- Grid reference: NS 410 236
- Platforms: 1

Other information
- Status: Disused

History
- Post-grouping: London, Midland and Scottish Railway

Key dates
- Circa 1926: Opened
- Circa 1938: Closed
Location

Weston Bridge Platform railway station or Weston Bridge Halt railway station was opened to serve miners travelling to the Ayr Colliery No. 9 Pit that stood near Annbank and those from the village that worked at other pits in the area, East Ayrshire, Scotland. The station was on the line that was originally part of the Ayr and Cumnock Branch of the Glasgow and South Western Railway. The location was well chosen as it lay close to the village, the hamlet of Burnbrae and at the busy crossroads at Weston Bridge.

== History ==
Little is recorded about the station however it is known to have been operational in July 1936 and July 1938. Wham states that it was used by miners travelling to work at collieries in the 1920s and 1930s. The London, Midland and Scottish railway opened the station as Weston Bridge Halt and had renamed it as Weston Bridge Platform by July 1926. The platform has been demolished and no signs of the station remain at the location.

The now solely freight line running through the station site is still operational (datum 2018), serving the Killoch Washery that lies to the south-east, beyond the village of Drongan.

Auchencruive Colliery Platform was a similar station built for the sole use miners and it was located a short distance to the East of Mossblown Junction, serving the workers of the colliery from 1898 to 1926. Miner's platforms were not unusual and another existed as Bargany Colliery Platform near Killochan on the line to Girvan.

The next station south on the Ayr - Cumnock branch used to be Trabboch, now closed and demolished, near Stair and the hamlet of that name and the colliery served by the railway. Annbank and its junction lay to the north.

== Infrastructure ==
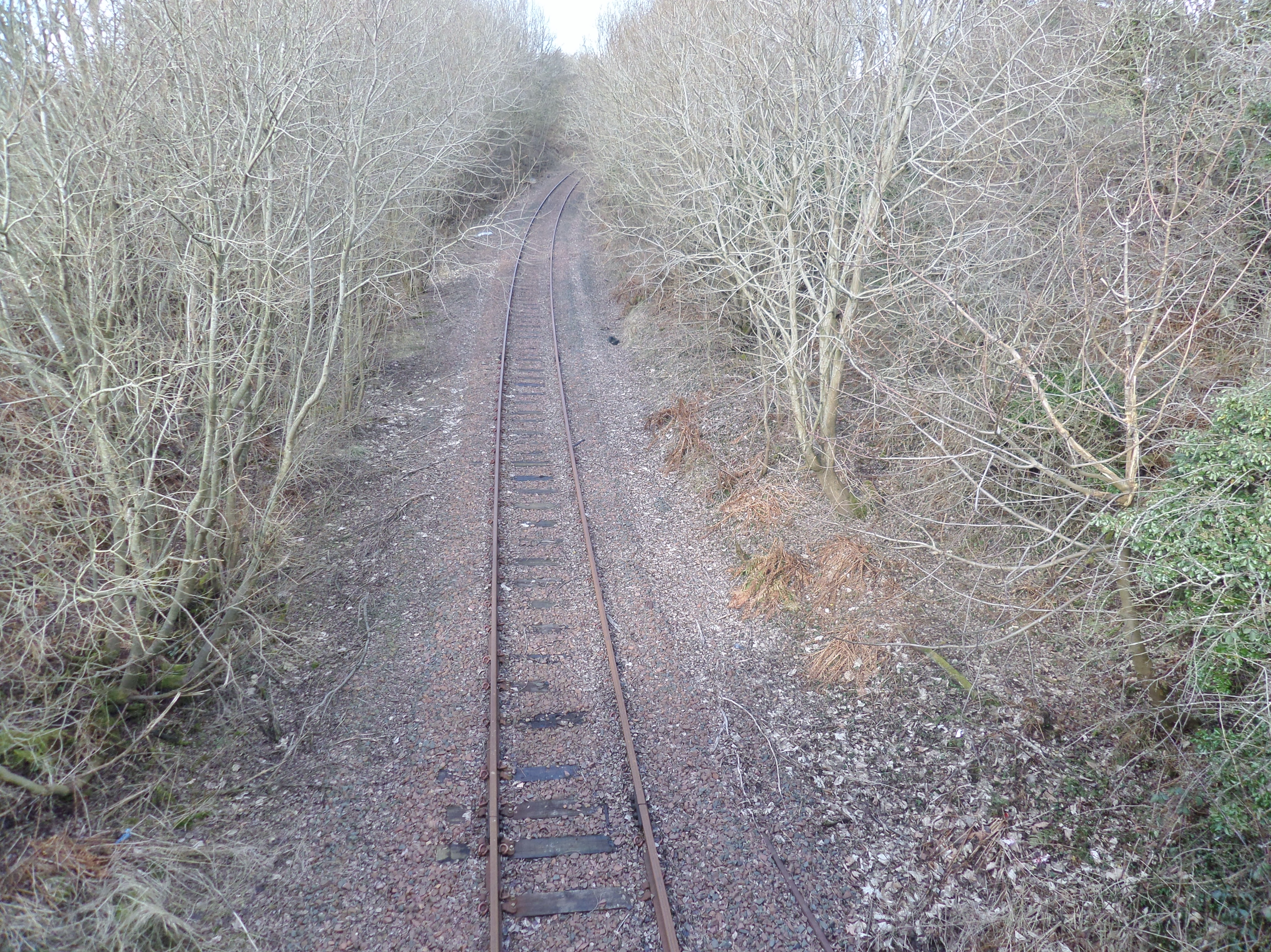
Location of the old station.

The station consisted of a single platform located on a curved section of track in a cutting on the eastern side of the single track line below the Weston Bridge opposite the old smithy. The halt was reached via a short footpath and steps running from the road above with vehicular access. Once this track lay close to a crane and siding running from Ayr colliery No.9. The lodge house at the entrance to Enterkine House still stands near by. The platform is not shown to have had a shelter or any other facilities and in addition no signalling appears to have been provided although a signal was located at the junction for Ayr Colliery.

A slight raised area is all that remains of the station together with the path that once led to it.

== See also ==
- Annbank railway station

Preceding station	Historical railways	Following station
Annbank; Line open; station closed	London, Midland and Scottish Railway; Ayr and Cumnock Branch	Trabboch; Line open; station closed
