= Commondyke railway station =

Former railway station in Scotland

Commondyke
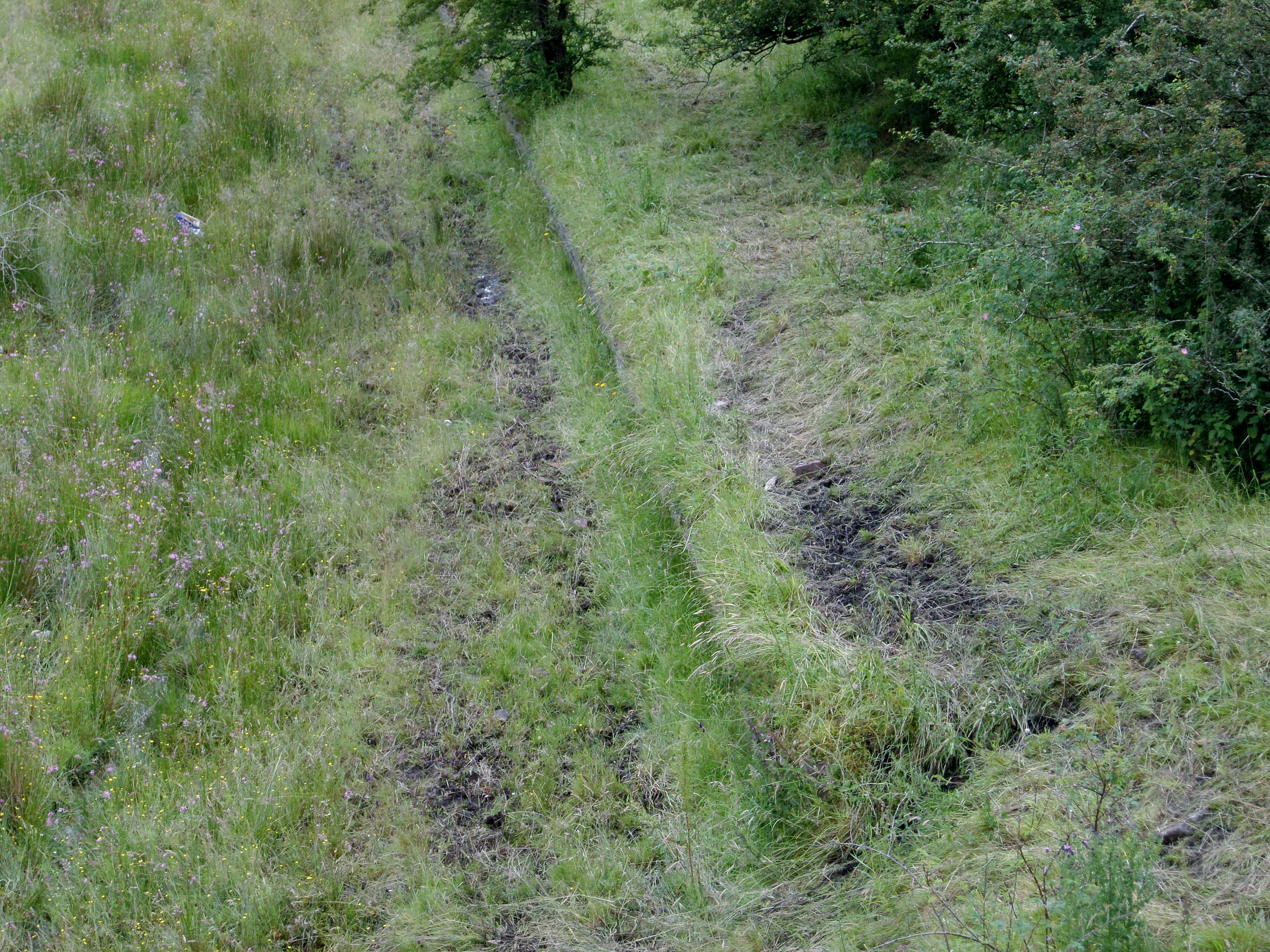
- Old platforms and trackbed at Commondyke

General information
- Location: Commondyke & Birnieknowe, Ayrshire; Scotland
- Coordinates: 55.4728°N 4.25293°W
- Grid reference: NS576221
- Platforms: 2

Other information
- Status: Disused

History
- Original company: Glasgow, Paisley, Kilmarnock and Ayr Railway
- Pre-grouping: Glasgow and South Western Railway
- Post-grouping: London, Midland and Scottish Railway

Key dates
- 9 August 1848: Opened
- 3 July 1950: Closed
Location

Commondyke railway station was a railway station on the Muirkirk branch that served the mining village, farms and community of Commondyke and Birnieknowe, East Ayrshire, Scotland. The station was originally part of the Glasgow, Paisley, Kilmarnock and Ayr Railway before passing to the Glasgow and South-Western Railway, then the London, Midland and Scottish upon grouping and closing under British Railways. Passenger services to Muirkirk station ceased in 1950.

== History ==
The station is recorded as having opened on 1st.November, 1897, and closed on 3 July 1950 however the line remained in use until 6 December 1976 serving a colliery at Gasswater near Cronberry. In 1857 four rows of miners cottages were located near the railway, namely Commondyke, Dyke, High and Low

In the 1895 OS map the rows are still present under the name Birnieknowe with a Roman Catholic religious community established composing St Patrick's Chapel, a convent, a presbytery and a school. By 1908 the name Birnieknowe applies to the religious community and Commondyke is used for the rows.

The evidence from OS maps and the G&SWR working time table of 1898 shows that a station was not actually established until sometime after 1898 with only a signal cabin present at that time. when the existence of a Roman Catholic school which had around 150 pupils at one time would have created a demand and need beyond that of the mining community and other locals who did not have sufficient earnings for regular use of the railway other than essential journeys and could have walked to Lugar station. Birnieknowe school remained open until around 1965.

A basic timetable existed of four trains a day in each direction and more at weekends.

== Infrastructure ==
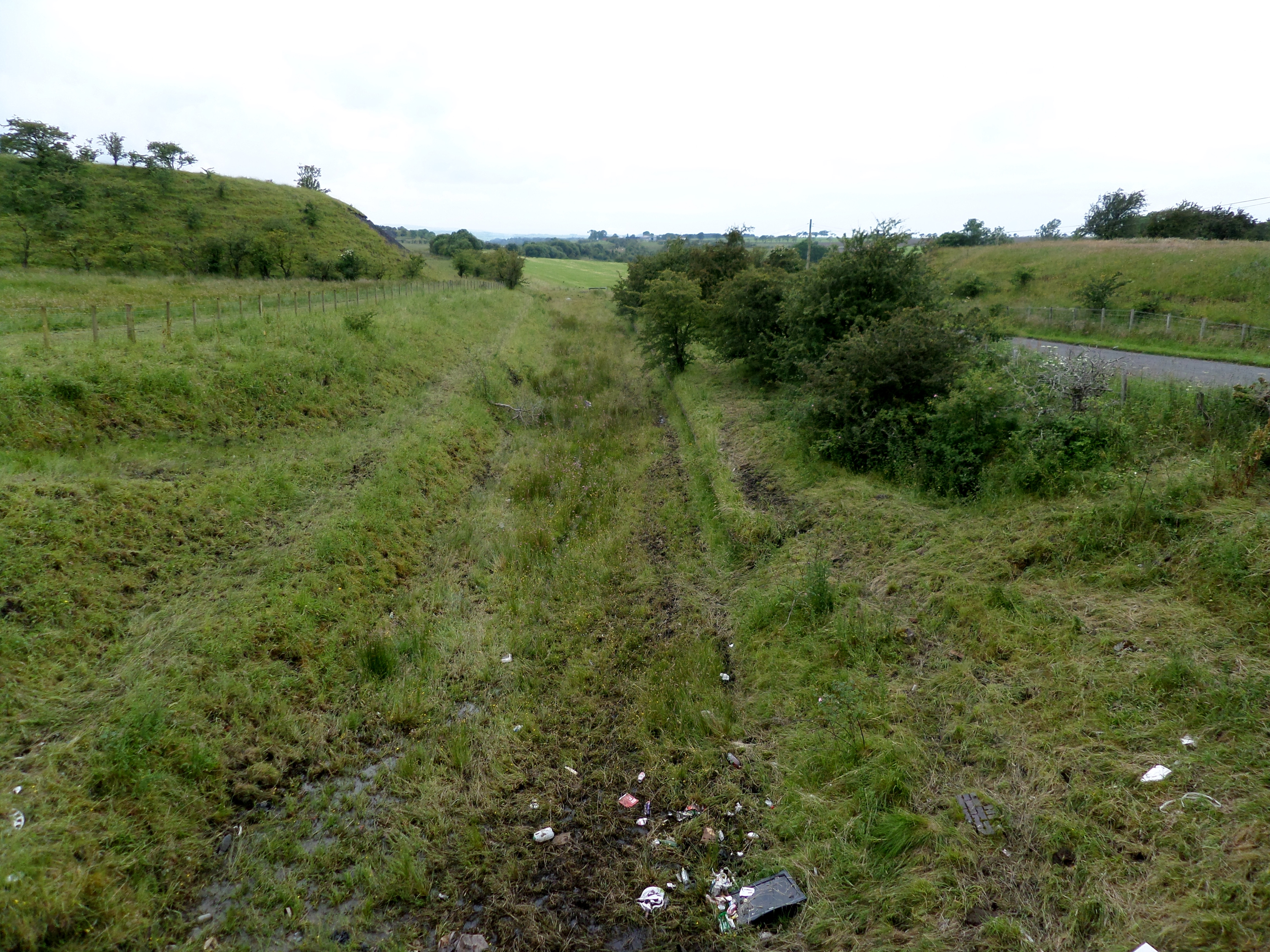
The site of the southern platform with the old passenger ramp.

The line opened as single track however the extent of the freight traffic necessitated doubling. Commondyke station had two platforms without any freight facilities of its own or any pointwork. A mineral line branched off to the north to a group of collieries in the vicinity of Darnconner. The line was once crossed to the east by a waggonway from the Lugar ironworks running to the Darnconner area and another freight branch from a west facing junction ran to collieries to the north, later re-aligned so as to run more directly to the Lugar Ironworks.

Although recorded as having opened in 1848 the 1857 OS map gives no indication of the existence of a station at Commondyke however Lugar station is marked a relatively short distance away. In 1895 the only suggestion of a station is the presence of two signal posts, one either side of the road bridge and a signal cabin on the southern side of the line. By 1908 the OS map shows that a station is present with the ticket office, shelters on both platforms, two buildings, one of which would have been a signal box and four signal posts. A path runs down to the southern platform from near the road over bridge.

The ticket office in the London, Midland and Scottish Railway days of the 1940s was a small wooden building standing over the northern side of the cutting close to the bridge with a steep set of steps running down to the platform and reached by a footpath.

A later photograph shows that at least one of the shelters had been removed.

== Micro-history ==
A memorial cross stands in an open area to the north, visible from the road that records that 'AT THE DISTANCE OF EIGHT FEET IN FRONT OF THIS SPOT THE REV SISTER LAURIENNE WAS ACCIDENTALLY KILLED ON THE 8TH DAY OF AUGUST 1888'. 'BEHOLD', MY BELOVED SAITH UNTO ME, 'RISE UP, MAKE HASTE, MY LOVE, MY DOVE, MY FAIR ONE, AND COME AWAY'. The train driver of the 0-4-0 engine No.90 running from Muirkirk was Johnnie Goodfellow, a Presbyterian, is said to have lived in fear of his locomotive being derailed by the Catholic community as an act of revenge. The nun involved was deaf and had not heard a train coming on the old line to the north whilst out searching for a missing school pupil.

Commondyke station had to be closed when Sister Laurienne's body was removed due to the throng of mourners trying to access the platform, thousands having attended the funeral.

Advanced plans existed to re-open the line from Auchinleck to an open-cast mine at Powharnel near Cronberry however these were eventually abandoned following the decision to close Longannet Power Station.

Preceding station	Disused railways	Following station
Lugar; Line and station closed	Glasgow and South Western Railway; Glasgow, Paisley, Kilmarnock and Ayr Railway	Auchinleck; Line closed; station open
