= Skares railway station =

Former railway station in East Ayrshire, Scotland

Coordinates: 55.4429°N 4.3267°W

Skares

General information
- Location: Skares, Ayrshire; Scotland
- Platforms: 2

Other information
- Status: Disused

History
- Pre-grouping: Glasgow and South Western Railway

Key dates
- 1 July 1872: Opened
- 10 September 1951: Closed
Location

Skares railway station was a railway station serving the former mining village of Skares, East Ayrshire, Scotland. The station was originally part of the Ayr and Cumnock Branch on the Glasgow and South Western Railway.

== History ==
The station opened on 1 July 1872, and closed on 10 September 1951.

Preceding station	Historical railways	Following station
Ochiltree; Line and station closed	Glasgow and South Western Railway; Ayr and Cumnock Branch	Dumfries House; Line and station closed
