= Dumfries House railway station =

Former railway station in Scotland

Coordinates: 55.4445°N 4.3113°W

Dumfries House
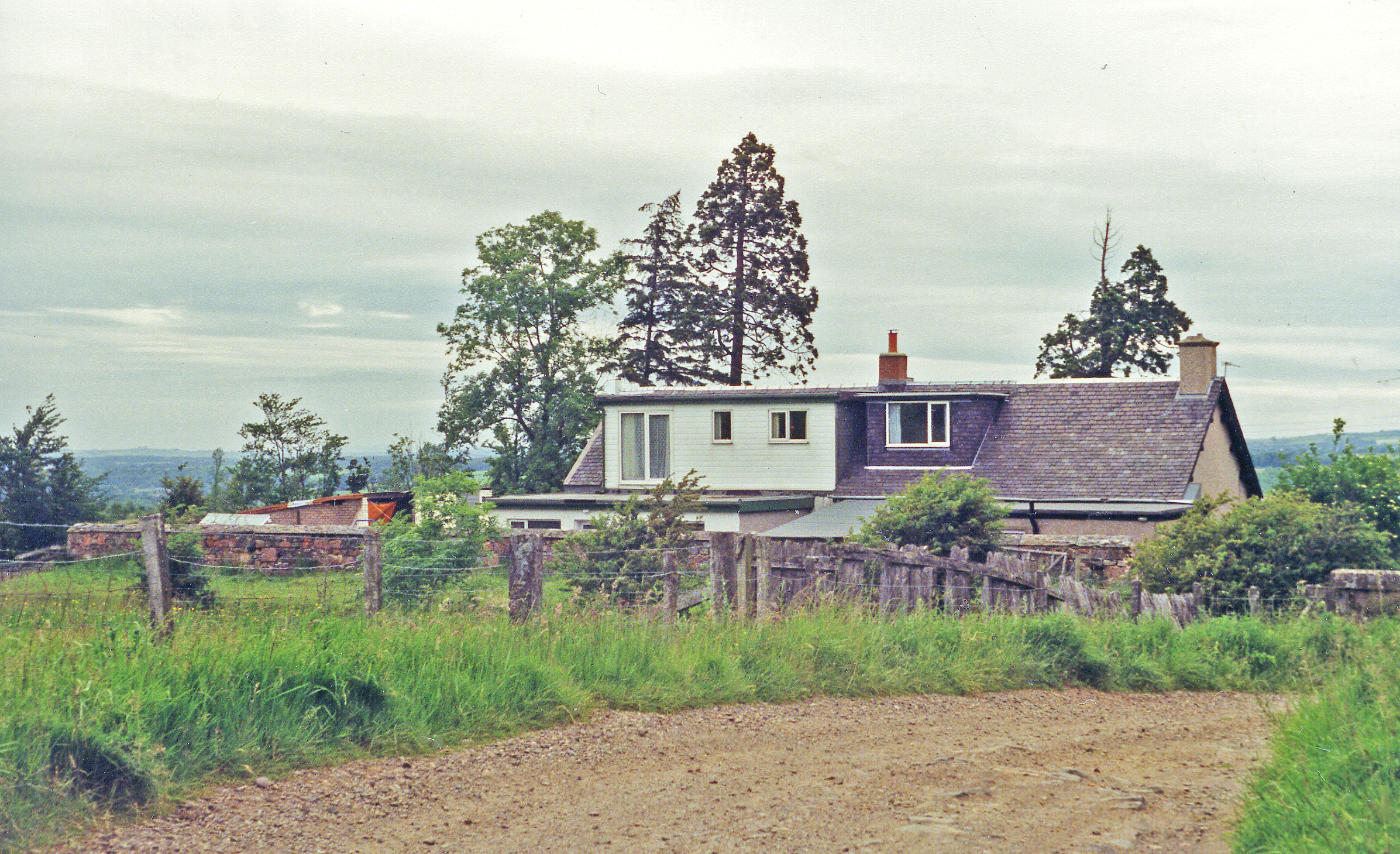
- Location of the station in 1996

General information
- Location: Near Dumfries House, Ayrshire; Scotland
- Platforms: 2

Other information
- Status: Disused

History
- Pre-grouping: Glasgow and South Western Railway

Key dates
- 1 July 1872: Opened
- 13 June 1949: Closed
Location

Dumfries House railway station was a railway station near Dumfries House, East Ayrshire, Scotland. The station was originally part of the Annbank to Cronberry Branch on the Glasgow and South Western Railway.

== History ==
The station opened on 1 July 1872, and closed on 13 June 1949.

Preceding station	Historical railways	Following station
Skares; Line and station closed	Glasgow and South Western Railway; Ayr and Cumnock Branch	Cumnock; Line and station closed
