= Auchincruive railway station =

Disused railway station in Ayrshire, Scotland

Coordinates: 55.48301°N 4.57656°W

Auchincruive
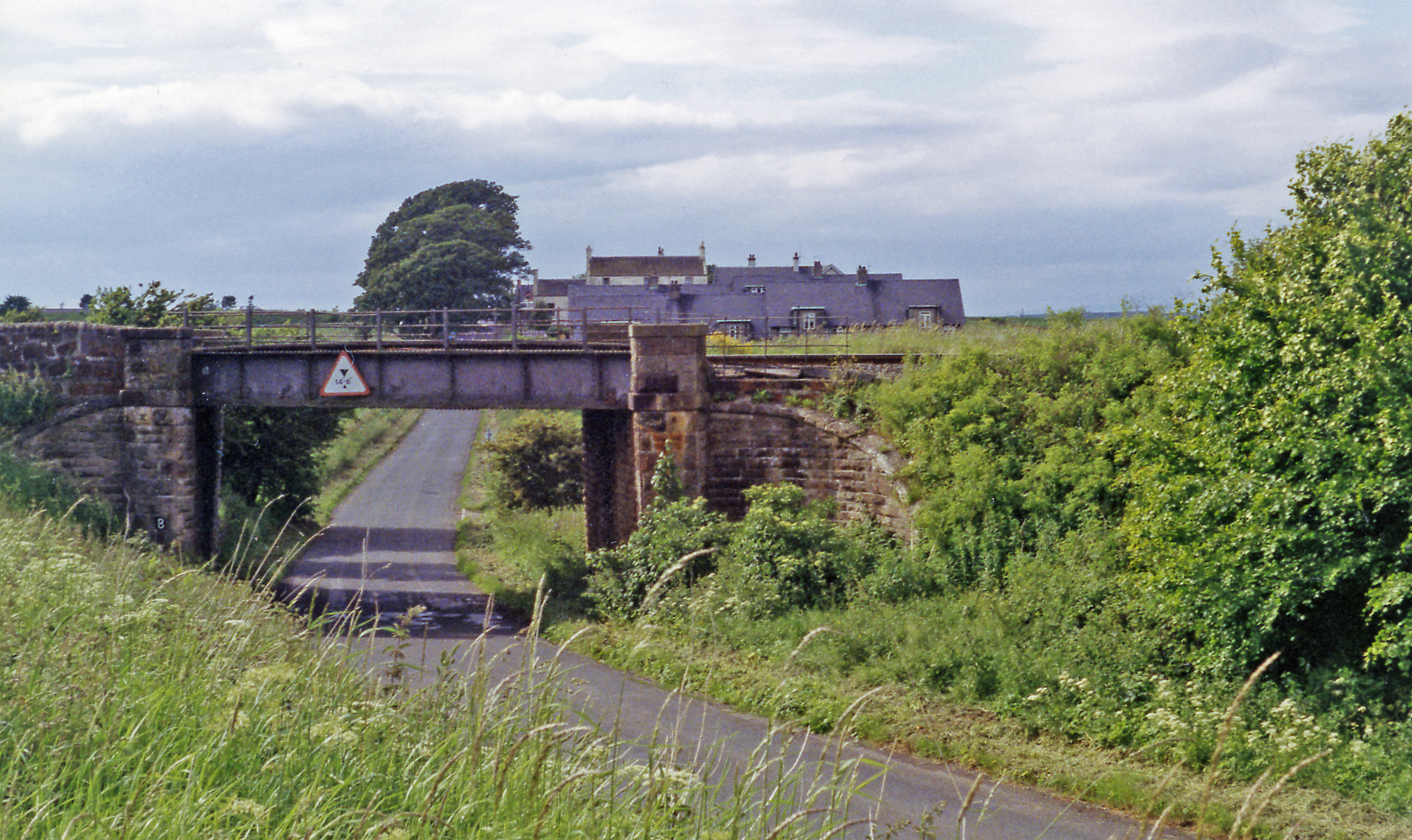
- Station site (1994)

General information
- Location: Auchincruive, Ayrshire; Scotland
- Platforms: 2

Other information
- Status: Disused

History
- Pre-grouping: Glasgow and South Western Railway

Key dates
- 1 September 1870: Opened
- 10 September 1951: Closed
Location

Auchincruive railway station was a railway station serving the settlement of St Quivox and the estate of Auchincruive, South Ayrshire, Scotland. The station was originally part of the Ayr to Mauchline Branch of the Glasgow and South Western Railway.

== History ==
The station opened on 1 September 1870, The station was part of the Ayr to Mauchline Branch of the Glasgow and South Western Railway. It became part of the London Midland and Scottish Railway during the Grouping of 1923. Passing on to the Scottish Region of British Railways during the nationalisation of 1948 who closed the station to regular passenger services on 10 September 1951.

== The site today ==
Today the Ayr to Mauchline line is still open as a freight line.

Preceding station	Historical railways	Following station
Ayr; Line and station open	Glasgow and South Western Railway; Ayr to Mauchline Branch	Annbank; Line open; station closed
