= Tarbolton (disambiguation) =

Tarbolton is a Scottish town. It may also refer to:

- Tarbolton F.C.
- Harold Tarbolton
- Tarbolton railway station
- Bachelors' Club, Tarbolton
- Jim Tarbolton
- Robert Burns#Tarbolton
- John Kelso Hunter#Tarbolton Lodge, the
