= Rankinston railway station =

Former railway station in Scotland

Rankinston
- Rankinston station in 1941

General information
- Location: Rankinston, Ayrshire; Scotland
- Coordinates: 55.3993°N 4.4473°W
- Grid reference: NS451144
- Platforms: 1

Other information
- Status: Disused

History
- Pre-grouping: Glasgow and South Western Railway

Key dates
- 1 January 1884: Opened
- 3 April 1950: Closed
Location

Rankinston railway station was a railway station serving the village of Rankinston, East Ayrshire, Scotland. The station was by the Glasgow and South Western Railway on the southern extension of the Ayr to Mauchline Branch.

== History ==
The station opened on 1 January 1884, and closed on 3 April 1950.

Preceding station	Historical railways	Following station
Holehouse Junction; Line and station closed	Glasgow and South Western Railway; Holehouse Branch	Ochiltree; Line and station closed
Cairntable Halt; Line and station closed	London, Midland and Scottish Railway; Holehouse Branch	Ochiltree; Line and station closed
