= Cumnock railway station, Ayrshire (1872–1951) =

Former railway station in Scotland

Coordinates: 55.4479°N 4.2600°W

Cumnock
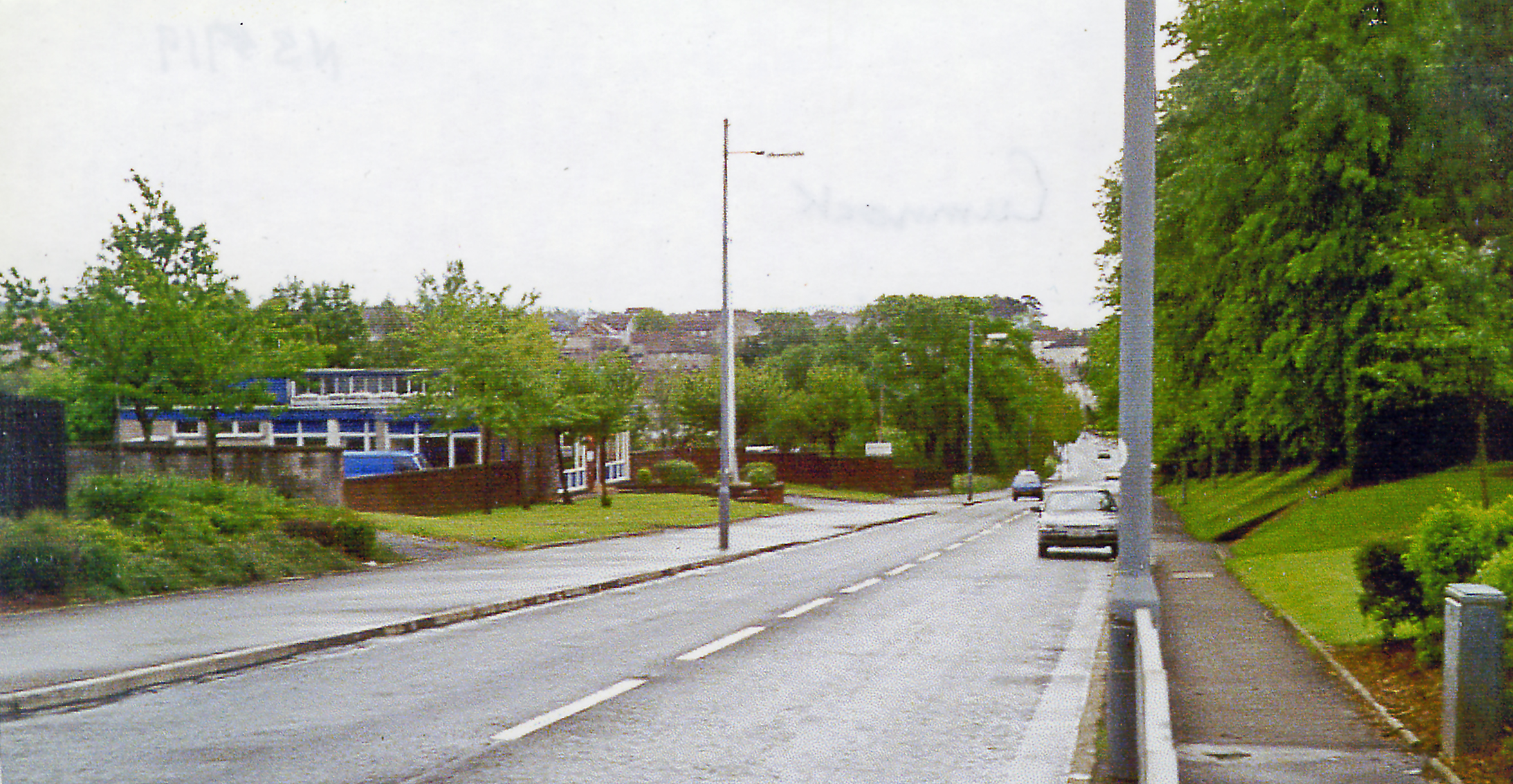
- Site of the station in 1994

General information
- Location: Cumnock, Ayrshire; Scotland
- Platforms: 2

Other information
- Status: Disused

History
- Pre-grouping: Glasgow and South Western Railway

Key dates
- 1 July 1872: Opened
- 10 September 1951: Closed
Location

Cumnock railway station was a railway station serving the town of Cumnock, East Ayrshire, Scotland. The station was originally part of the Annbank to Cronberry Branch on the Glasgow and South Western Railway.

== History ==
The station opened on 1 July 1872, and closed on 10 September 1951.

Preceding station	Historical railways	Following station
Dumfries House; Line and station closed	Glasgow and South Western Railway; Ayr and Cumnock Branch	Cronberry; Line and station closed
