= Drongan railway station =

Former railway station in Scotland

Coordinates: 55.4402°N 4.4589°W

Drongan
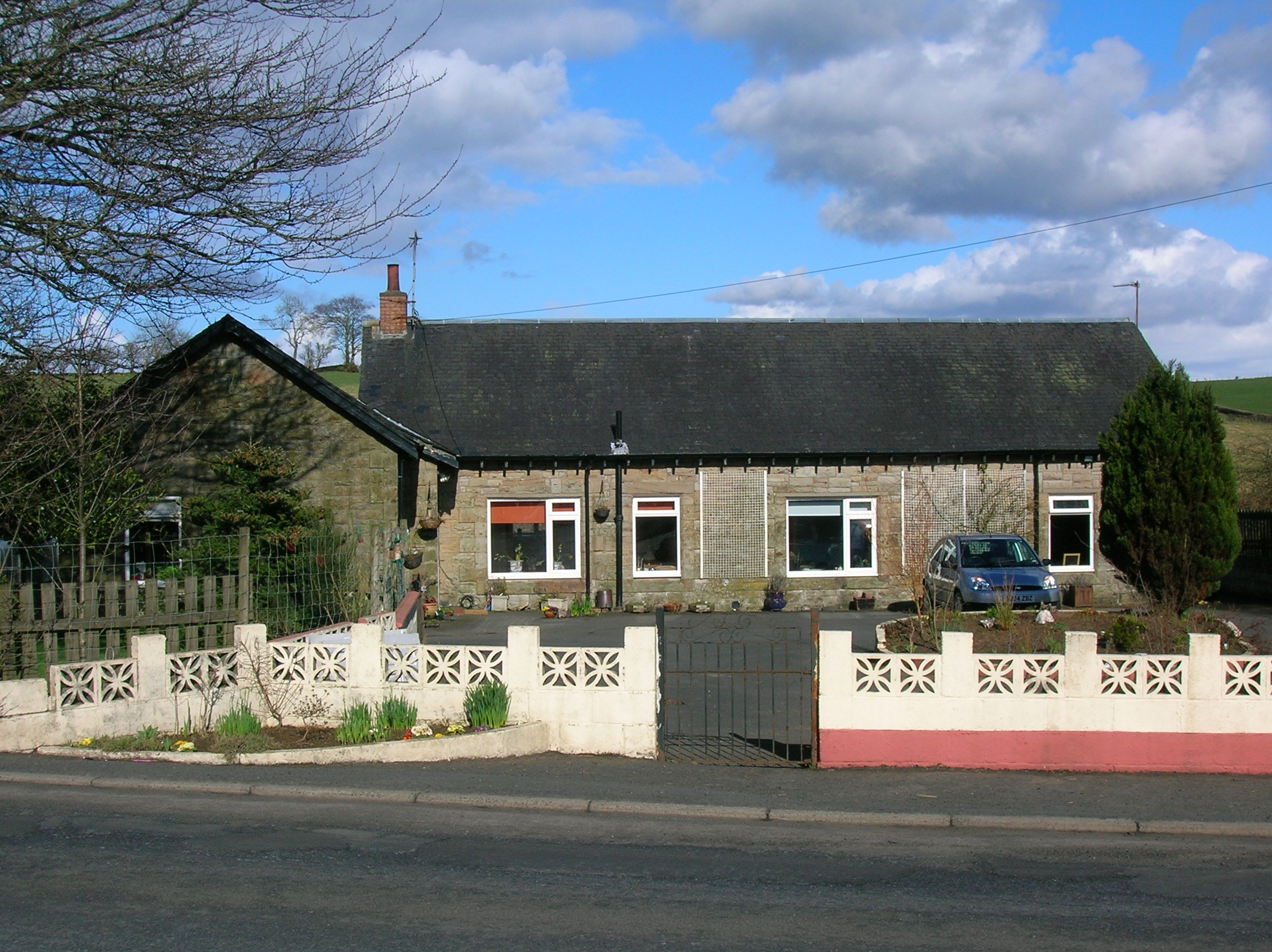
- The old railway station

General information
- Location: Drongan, Ayrshire; Scotland
- Platforms: 1

Other information
- Status: Disused

History
- Pre-grouping: Glasgow and South Western Railway

Key dates
- 1 July 1872: Opened
- 10 September 1951: Closed
Location

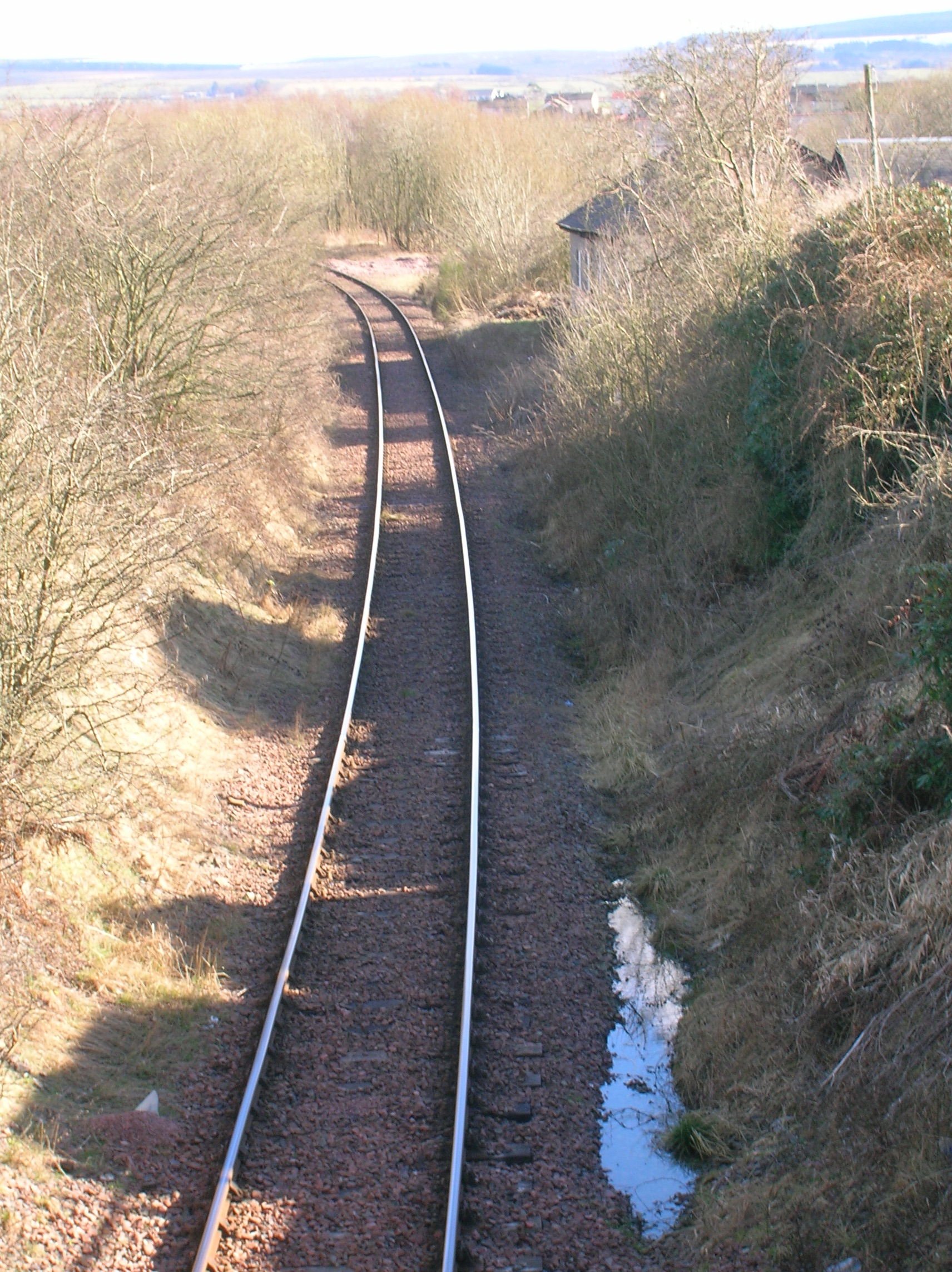
The site of the old station platform

Drongan railway station (NS445190) was a railway station serving the village of Drongan, East Ayrshire, Scotland. The station was originally part of the Ayr and Cumnock Branch on the Glasgow and South Western Railway.

== History ==
The station opened on 1 July 1872, and closed on 10 September 1951. A line left the station heading east to serve the Killoch Ironworks. The line is still operational today, now serving the Killoch Washery.

Preceding station	Historical railways	Following station
Trabboch; Line open; station closed	Glasgow and South Western Railway; Ayr and Cumnock Branch	Ochiltree; Line and station closed
