= Skares =

Village in East Ayrshire, Scotland

Coordinates: 55.42838°N 4.32453°W

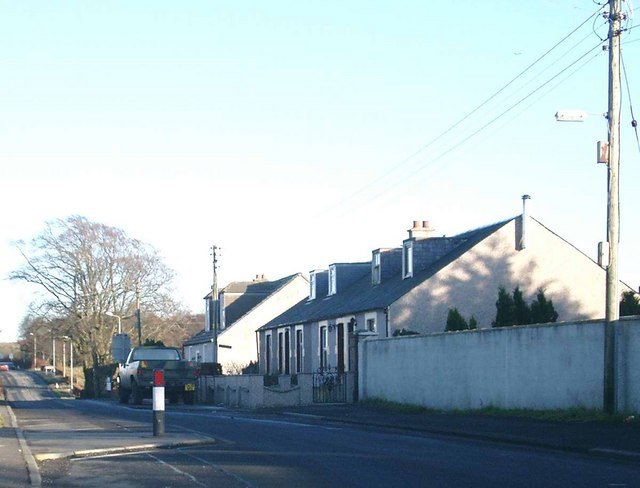
- Skares

- Location within East Ayrshire
- OS grid reference: NS530174
- Council area: East Ayrshire
- Lieutenancy area: Ayrshire and Arran
- Country: Scotland
- Sovereign state: United Kingdom
- Post town: CUMNOCK
- Postcode district: KA18
- Police: Scotland
- Fire: Scottish
- Ambulance: Scottish
- UK Parliament: Ayr, Carrick and Cumnock
- Scottish Parliament: Carrick, Cumnock and Doon Valley

Skares is a village in East Ayrshire, Scotland.

Skares is located some 3 miles (5 km) southwest of Cumnock. It used to have a football team called Skares Bluebells. Skares consisted of an older core of a village and three miners terraces. They were called, The Old Raw, The New Raw and the Tap Raw. These were built as mining expanded in the area, although today the mining has gone, with the most recent mining activity being an opencast mine behind Skares, which closed in the mid 2010s.

From 1872 to 1951 it was served by Skares railway station.
