= Cronberry railway station =

Former railway station in Scotland

Cronberry
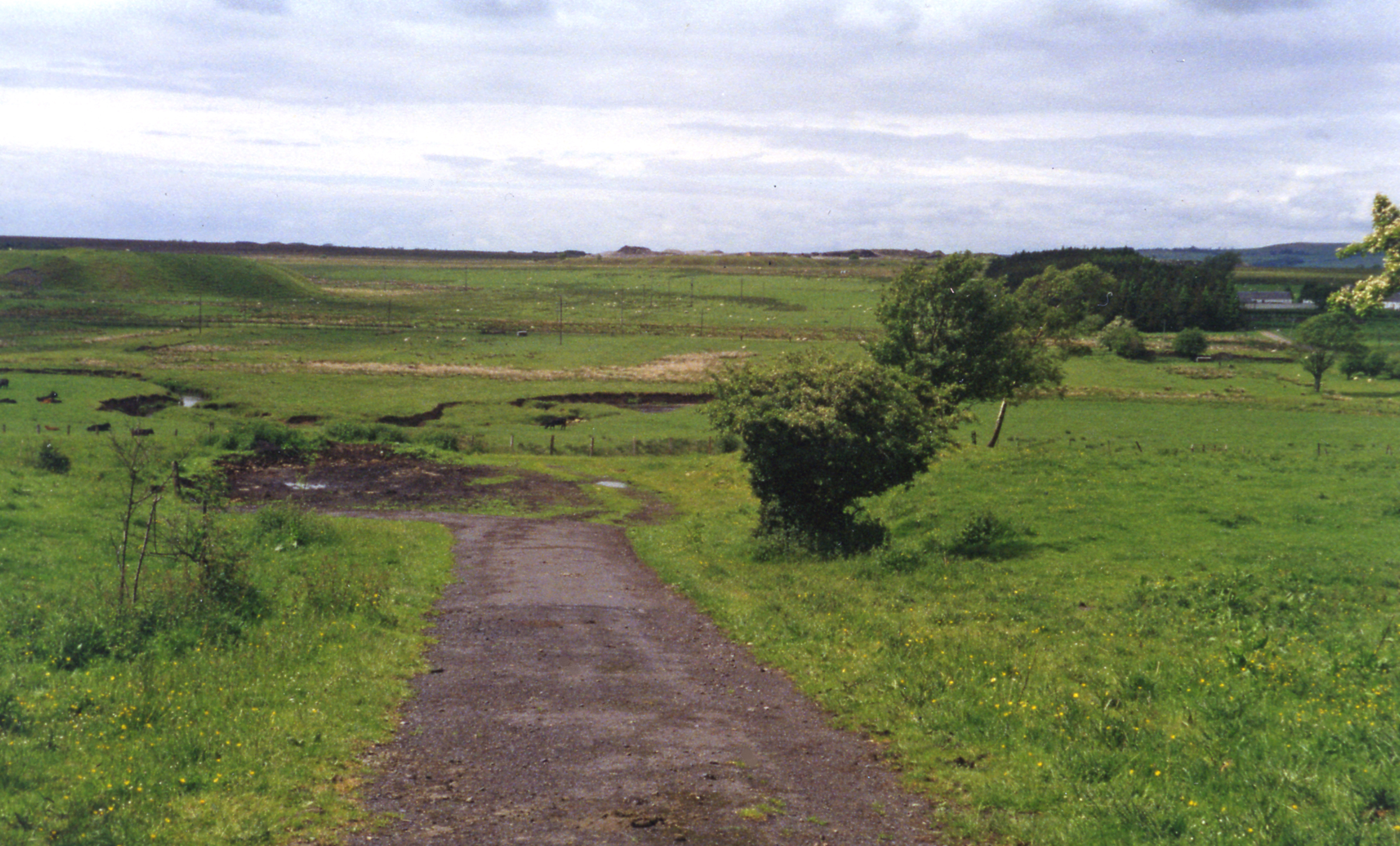
- Site of Cronberry station

General information
- Location: Cronberry, Ayrshire; Scotland
- Coordinates: 55.4770°N 4.2044°W
- Grid reference: NS607225
- Platforms: 2

Other information
- Status: Disused

History
- Original company: Glasgow, Paisley, Kilmarnock and Ayr Railway
- Pre-grouping: Glasgow and South Western Railway
- Post-grouping: London, Midland and Scottish Railway

Key dates
- 9 August 1848: Opened
- 10 September 1951: Closed
Location

Cronberry railway station was a railway station serving the hamlet of Cronberry, East Ayrshire, Scotland. The station was originally part of the Glasgow, Paisley, Kilmarnock and Ayr Railway.

== History ==
The station opened on 9 August 1848, and closed on 10 September 1951. The Annbank-Cronberry line opened for goods on 11 June 1872 and for passengers on 1 July 1872. The section of the line from Auchinleck to Cronberry, including the Mosshouse viaduct, remained open until December 1976 for coal traffic out of the Gaswater siding.

Preceding station	Historical railways	Following station
Muirkirk; Line and station closed	Glasgow and South Western Railway; Glasgow, Paisley, Kilmarnock and Ayr Railway	Lugar; Line and station closed
Cumnock; Line and station closed	Glasgow and South Western Railway; Ayr and Cumnock Branch	Connection with GPK&AR
