= Annbank railway station =

Railway station in Scotland

Annbank
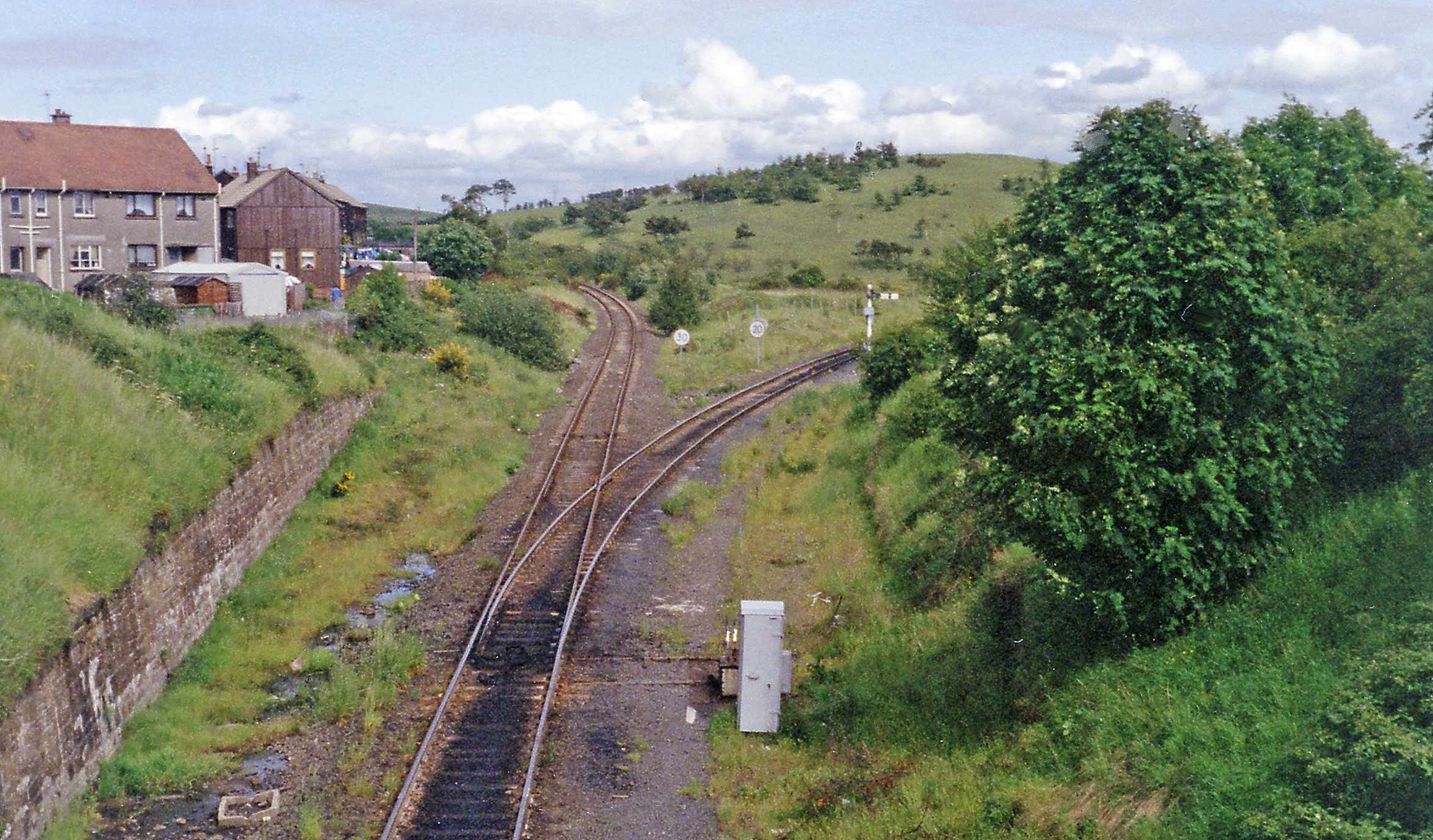
- Location of the station in 1994

General information
- Location: Mossblown, Ayrshire; Scotland
- Coordinates: 55.4910°N 4.5270°W
- Platforms: 4

Other information
- Status: Disused

History
- Pre-grouping: Glasgow and South Western Railway
- Post-grouping: LMS

Key dates
- 1 September 1870: Opened
- 10 September 1951: Closed
Location

Annbank railway station was a railway station serving the villages of Annbank and Mossblown, South Ayrshire, Scotland. The station was part of the Ayr to Mauchline Branch of the Glasgow and South Western Railway.

== History ==
The station opened on 1 September 1870, and closed to regular passenger services on 10 September 1951. There was a line heading south from this station leading to Cumnock. There was also a line that headed north west to join the former Glasgow, Paisley, Kilmarnock and Ayr Railway just south of Monkton railway station.

Opened by the Glasgow and South Western Railway, it became part of the London, Midland and Scottish Railway during the Grouping of 1923. The station then passed on to the Scottish Region of British Railways in 1948, only surviving three years into the nationalised era before closure to passengers by British Railways.

Weston Bridge Halt railway station was located at Annbank near Ayr Colliery No.9 and was used by miners travelling to their respective collieries.

Today the Ayr to Mauchline line is still open as a freight line. The line to the south is open as far as Drongan, serving the former Killoch Colliery.

Preceding station	Historical railways	Following station
Connection to Ayr to Mauchline Branch	Glasgow and South Western Railway; Monkton and Annbank Branch	Newtonhead; Line and station closed
Auchincruive; Line open; station closed	Glasgow and South Western Railway; Ayr to Mauchline Branch	Tarbolton; Line open; station closed
Connection to Ayr to Mauchline Branch	Glasgow and South Western Railway; Ayr and Cumnock Branch	Trabboch; Line open; station closed
