= Tarbolton railway station =

Former railway station in Scotland

Coordinates: 55.494°N 4.471°W

Tarbolton
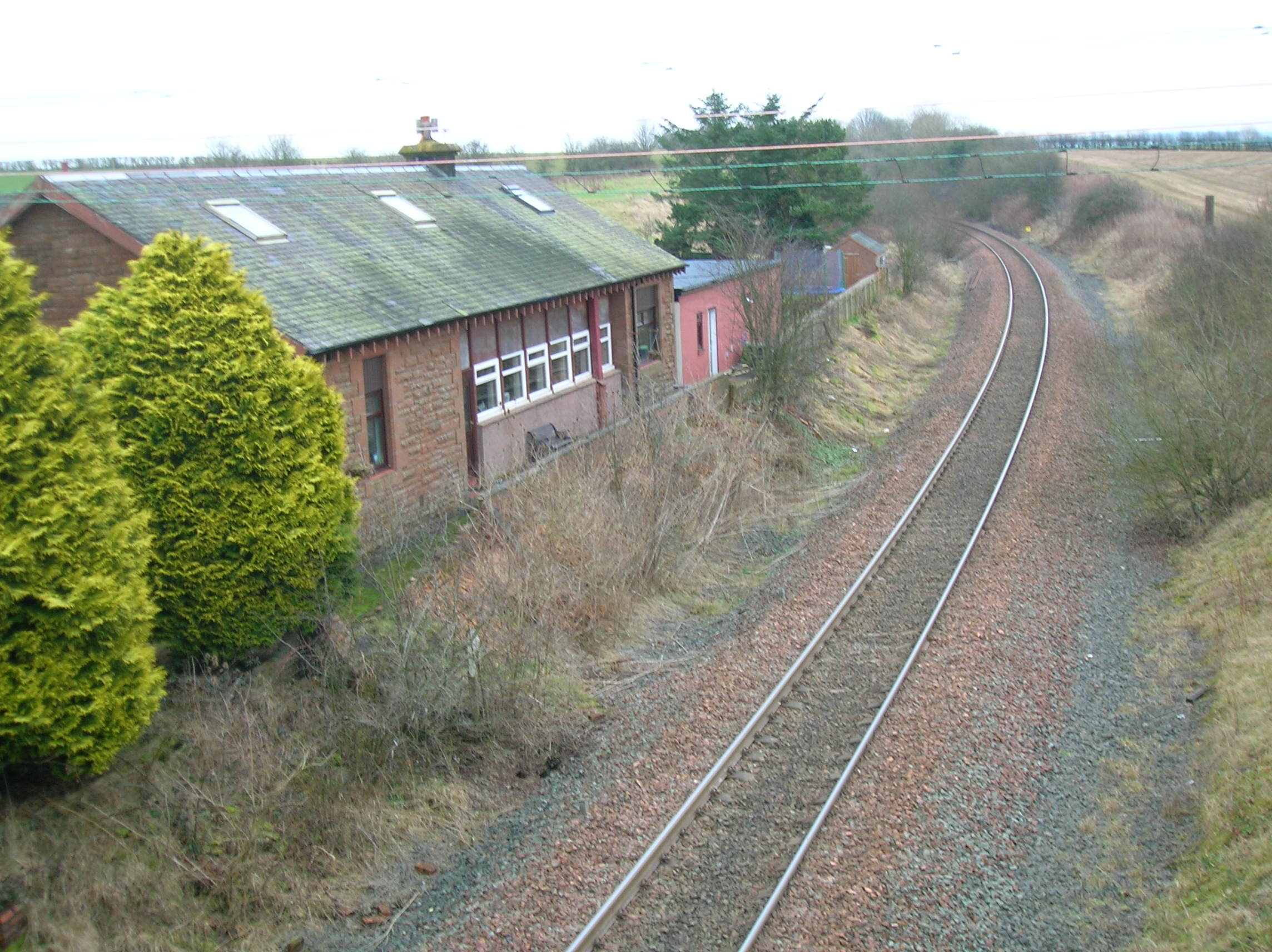
- Tarbolton station site in 2010

General information
- Location: Tarbolton, South Ayrshire; Scotland
- Platforms: 2

Other information
- Status: Disused

History
- Pre-grouping: Glasgow and South Western Railway

Key dates
- 1 September 1870: Opened
- 4 January 1943: Closed
Location

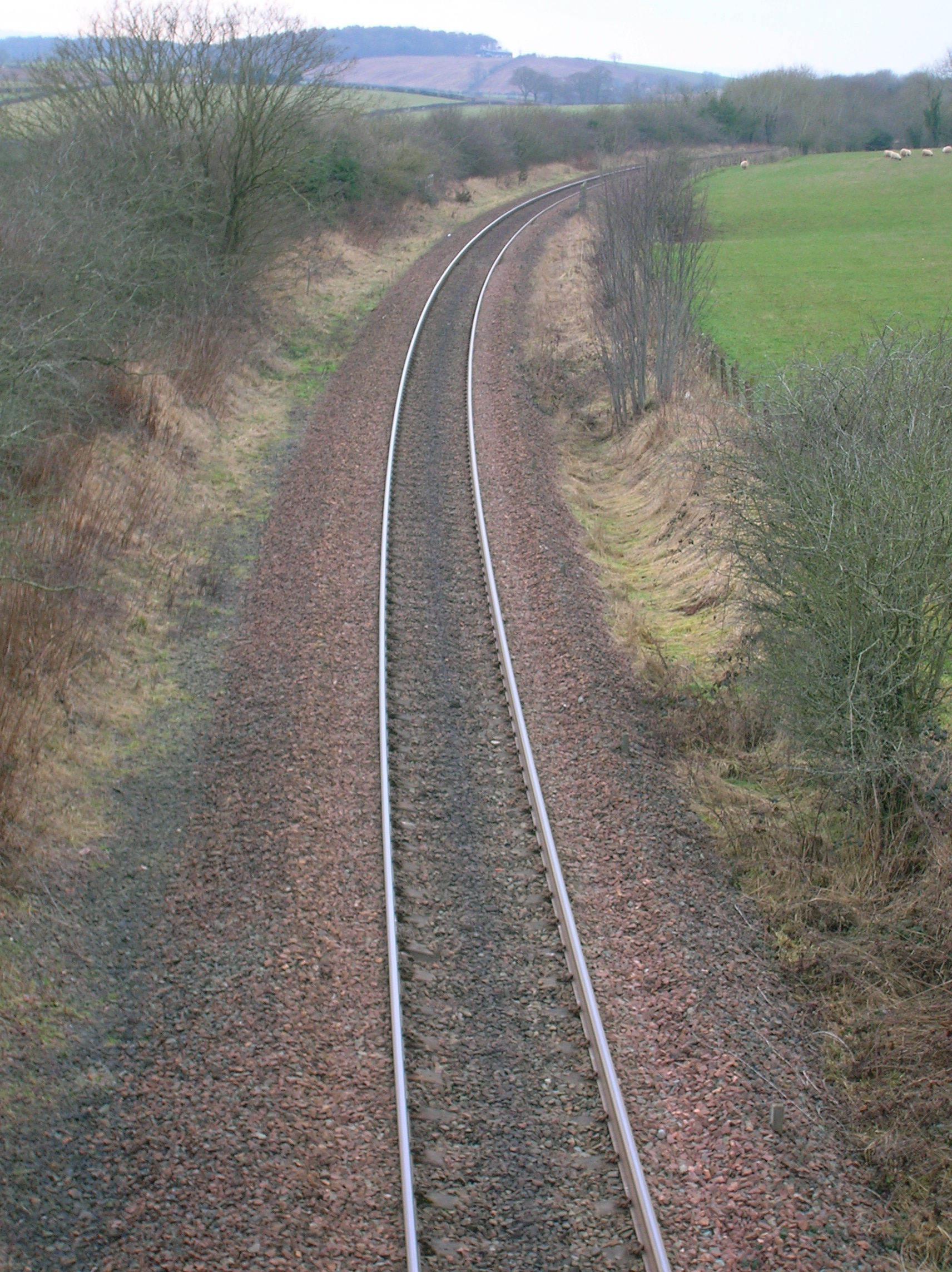
The line to Ayr at the Tarbolton station overbridge.

Tarbolton railway station (NGR NS440250) was a railway station about a mile and a quarter from the village of Tarbolton that it served, in South Ayrshire, Scotland. The station was part of the Ayr to Mauchline Branch of the Glasgow and South Western Railway and was the only intermediate stop on the previously double track line between Annbank and Mauchline. The line was singled in 1985 and held in reserved state before reopening with an increase in coal traffic.

== History ==
The station opened on 1 September 1870, and closed to passengers on 4 January 1943. The signal box was still operational in 1963 to control the passing loop; both platforms were also in situ.

Today this line is still open as a freight line.

Preceding station	Historical railways	Following station
Annbank; Line open; station closed	Glasgow and South Western Railway; Ayr to Mauchline Branch	Mauchline; Line open; station closed
