= Trabboch railway station =

Railway station in East Ayrshire, Scotland

Coordinates: 55.4652°N 4.4783°W

Trabboch
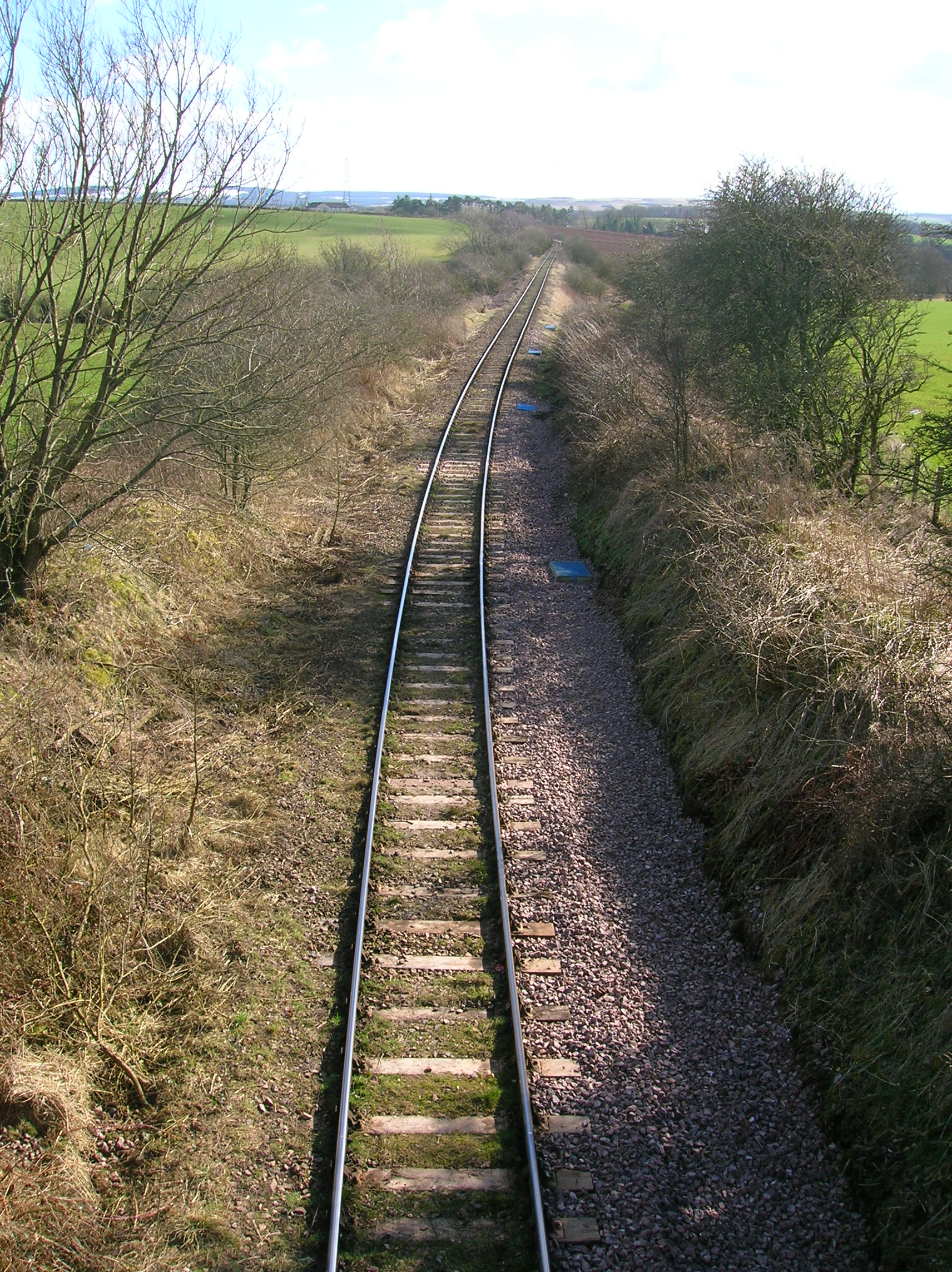
- The site of the old railway station

General information
- Location: Trabboch, Ayrshire; Scotland
- Platforms: 1

Other information
- Status: Disused

History
- Pre-grouping: Glasgow and South Western Railway

Key dates
- 1 July 1872 or 1896: Opened
- 10 September 1951: Closed
Location

Trabboch railway station (NS434218) was a railway station serving the village of Trabboch, East Ayrshire, Scotland. The station was originally part of the Ayr and Cumnock Branch on the Glasgow and South Western Railway.

== History ==
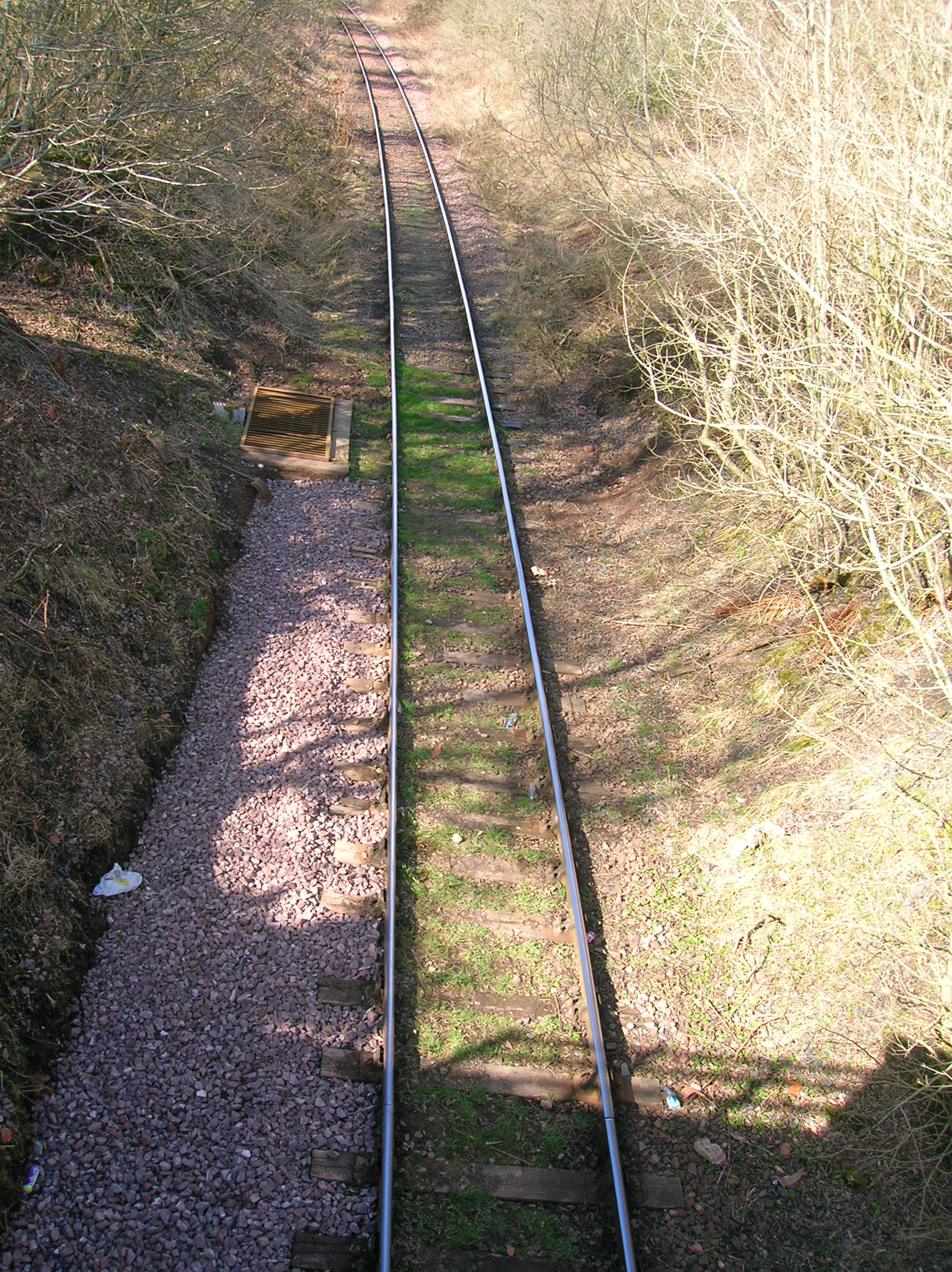
The line running north from the site of the station.

The station opened on 1 July 1872 or 1896, and closed on 10 September 1951. The station master or 'collector' from 1935 - 43 was Mr. H. Ramage. It was near an overbridge built for future doubling that never took place and had a single platform of 315 feet which partly occupied the space beneath the bridge and a brick built storeroom was located below the bridge arch, reaching up to the underside of the arch. On this platform stood a small timber waiting room and a booking office. Trabboch Colliery's four sidings were not far away.

After the closure of the local mines in 1908 for a time some of the miners from Trabboch village walked to the station and caught the train to Skares where they worked at Whitehill Colliery whilst others found work at Burnockhill Colliery that was located in the locality.

Fulton, C., & Co., Paisley had six traders waggons which ran between Paisley and Trabboch stations.

The station building was demolished and by 1970 nothing was visible. The stones from the old station were used by Willie Graham to build a bungalow at Carbowie.

The line at the station site is still operational (2017), serving the Killoch Washery to the south-east, beyond Drongan.

== See also ==
- Loch of Trabboch

Preceding station	Historical railways	Following station
Annbank; Line open; station closed	Glasgow and South Western Railway; Ayr and Cumnock Branch	Drongan; Line open; station closed
