= Lugar railway station =

Former railway station in Scotland

Coordinates: 55.4736°N 4.2322°W

Lugar

General information
- Location: Lugar, Ayrshire; Scotland
- Platforms: 2

Other information
- Status: Disused

History
- Original company: Glasgow, Paisley, Kilmarnock and Ayr Railway
- Pre-grouping: Glasgow and South Western Railway
- Post-grouping: London, Midland and Scottish Railway

Key dates
- 9 August 1848: Opened
- 3 July 1950: Closed
Location

Lugar railway station was a railway station serving the Lugar Ironworks, East Ayrshire, Scotland. The station was originally part of the Glasgow, Paisley, Kilmarnock and Ayr Railway.

== History ==
The station opened on 9 August 1848, and closed on 3 July 1950.

Preceding station	Historical railways	Following station
Cronberry; Line and station closed	Glasgow and South Western Railway; Glasgow, Paisley, Kilmarnock and Ayr Railway	Commondyke; Line and station closed
