= Don Lees =

Scottish footballer

Personal information
- Full name: William Lees
- Date of birth: 1873
- Place of birth: Cronberry, Scotland
- Date of death: Not known
- Positions: Centre half; forward

Senior career*
Years	Team	Apps	(Gls)
–	Cronberry Eglington		
1892–1893	Celtic	1	(0)
1893–1894	Lincoln City	28	(17)
1894	Celtic	3	(3)
1894–1895	Lincoln City	24	(7)
–	Barnsley St Peter's		
1895–1896	Darwen	20	(8)
1897–1904	Barnsley (Note: Barnsley appearances are for Football League matches only, not Midland or Yorkshire Leagues.)	187	(42)
1904–1905	Watford	6	(2)
1905	Barnsley	1	(0)
1905–	Denaby United		
–	South Kirkby		
–	Monk Bretton		
–	South Kirkby		
- * Club domestic league appearances and goals

William Lees (1873 – after 1905), also known as Don, Donald, or Walter Lees, was a Scottish professional footballer who scored 74 goals from 260 appearances in the Football League playing for Lincoln City, Darwen and Barnsley. He also played in the Scottish League for Celtic. He played either as a forward or as a centre half.

== Football career ==
Lees was born in Cronberry, then in Ayrshire, in 1873. He joined Celtic in 1892, and made his debut on 1 October 1892 against Clyde in the Scottish League. Lees moved to England to play for Lincoln City, and was ever-present and the club's leading scorer with 17 goals in the 1893–94 Football League season, a total which includes a hat-trick against Rotherham Town in an 8–2 win which remains (as of 2010) the club's record Football League away win. He rejoined Celtic in May 1894, but accusations that the club had offered illegal inducements to attract him back resulted in the Football Association preventing Celtic from playing friendly matches in England. The consequent financial loss meant Celtic allowed Lees to return to Lincoln in October 1894, by which time he had scored three goals from the first three Scottish League games of the 1894–95 season.

He remained with Lincoln for the rest of the season, then went on to play in the Football League for Darwen, a club in financial difficulties with low morale, where he missed a month of the season when suspended by the club for misconduct. He then moved on to Barnsley, playing nearly 200 Football League games for the club over six seasons, and also played for Southern League club Watford, before moving into non-League football in the Barnsley area.
