= Ochiltree railway station =

Former railway station in Scotland

Coordinates: 55.4425°N 4.3562°W

Ochiltree
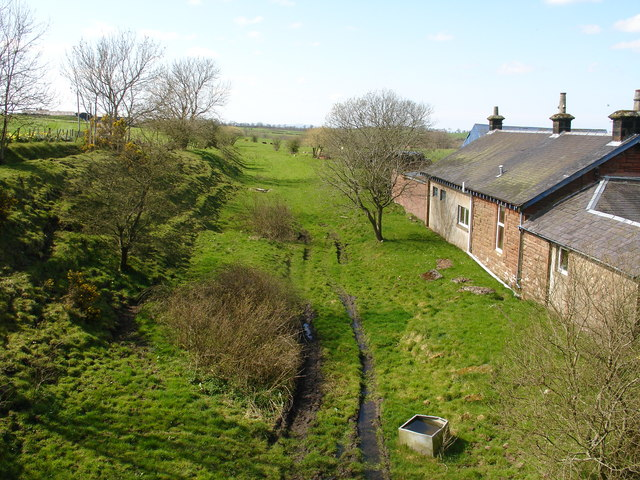
- The site of the station in 2007

General information
- Location: Ochiltree, Ayrshire; Scotland
- Platforms: 2

Other information
- Status: Disused

History
- Pre-grouping: Glasgow and South Western Railway

Key dates
- 1 July 1872: Opened
- 10 September 1951: Closed
Location

Ochiltree railway station was a railway station serving the village of Ochiltree, East Ayrshire, Scotland. The station was originally part of the Annbank to Cronberry Branch on the Glasgow and South Western Railway.

== History ==
The station opened on 1 July 1872, and closed on 10 September 1951.

| Preceding station | Historical railways | Following station |
|---|---|---|
| Drongan; Line and station closed | Glasgow and South Western Railway; Ayr and Cumnock Branch | Skares; Line and station closed |
| Rankinston; Line and station closed | Glasgow and South Western Railway; Holehouse Branch | Skares; Line and station closed |
