= Cronberry =

Village in East Ayrshire, Scotland, UK

Coordinates: 55.47°N 04.21°W

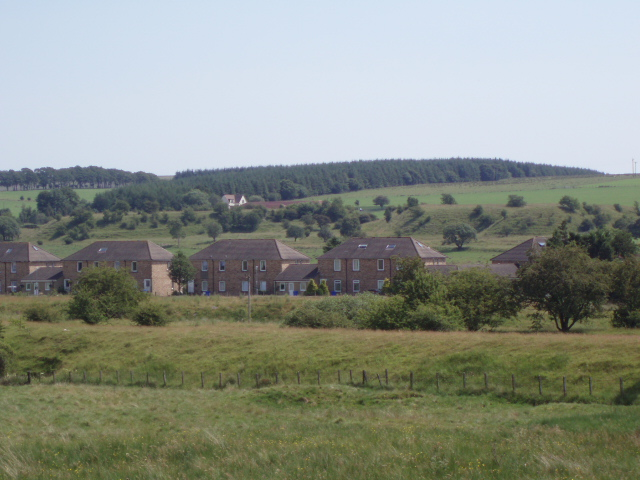
The village of Cronberry

Cronberry is a small hamlet situated north-east of Cumnock and one mile north-east of Lugar, in East Ayrshire, Scotland. The Bellow Water river runs past the settlement.

== History ==
The meaning of Cronberry is suggested by Johnston as being from the Gaelic cronag, a 'a fort' and the Old English byrig, a 'burgh' or 'fortified place'.

Cronberry has a Scottish Women's Institutes chapter which meets in the old school.

Football manager Bill Shankly once played for the Cronberry Eglinton youth football club.

Diane and Holly Fallon were murdered at Cronberry in 2009 by a former soldier, Thomas Smith, who was sentenced to serve a minimum of 32 years in prison.

=== The mining village ===
Cronberry (or Kronberry) appears on maps as far back as 1654. Its actual age, however, is thought to be much older. It probably, though as yet unconfirmed, existed as part of the fief of Auchinleck (various spelling) well before 1400. The more recent Cronberry was built in the 1860s by the Eglinton Iron Company. Cronberry had seven miner rows set in lines and not streets or squares, the back of one line facing the front of another. One row had a store, managed as a co-op and as a branch of the Lugar store. Later, the store was semi-detached with the school, which when replaced by a new school building in 1931, became the village hall. Mortonmuir Park lay across the road from Store Row, famous for being the ground where Cronberry Eglinton football team played.

The village, in the Parish of Auchinleck, had a public school and in the 1880s a population of 799.

In 1913 the population was approximately 600, and not a single washing-house existed for the whole population. Only the Store Row, No. 7, had a coal house and was built of stone, unlike the others that were built of bricks. The pathways in front of the houses were at that time all unpaved, and the winter condition resembled a quagmire. The village had a gravitation water supply, and there were two wells in every row. Rows 4 - 6 had roofs of tarred felt, the so-called 'Tarry Rows' demolished in the 1920s.

The village was owned by William Baird & Co. The older miners' rows were demolished and the occupants rehoused in Lugar. Riverside Terrace houses were more modern, dating from the 1920s and were converted to form private housing.

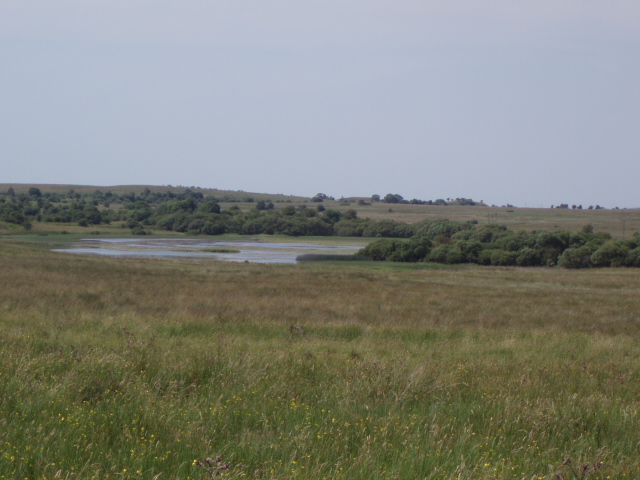
The Lugar Lochs viewed from Cronberry.

=== Industrial sites ===
The remains of Cronberry Moor colliery, comprising the remains of a bing, lie to the north-west of Cronberry village at NGR NS 6031 2281. Mortonmuir Colliery was begun in 1948 and opened in 1950 as one of the National Coal Board's short term drift mines; it closed after only four years as much of the coal was found to have been extracted previously. Locals have stated that no coal at all was found.

An ironstone mine existed at Cronberry in the 1880s, as did a claypit and tileworks.

=== Covenanting ===
The Cameron Stone on nearby Airds Moss commemorates the Reverend Richard Cameron and eight other Covenanter soldiers killed in the Battle of Airds Moss against a troop of dragoons in July 1680. The memorial lies near Muirkirk and was restored in 2005. The village never had its own church.

=== Archaeology ===
Excavations at Cronberry, conducted by Headland Archaeology in advance of open-cast mining, revealed a medieval turf building and a nearby turf enclosure of unknown date. The turf structure was sub-rectangular and contained a hearth surrounded by some paving with pottery dating to no later than the 16th century. The same excavations also found a series of agricultural enclosures, no earlier than the 19th century.

The plan of the turf building was exposed during excavation. Due to the construction's materials and nature, it had been greatly affected by soil processes since it went out of use. The walls appear to have been made from a mixture of turf and local soil. Preservation was found to vary with the south end being best preserved. Extensive slumping had occurred and this, combined with subsequent decay, made excavation difficult. The presence of charcoal and charred cereal grains within the walls suggested that material from earlier occupation may have been incorporated and the remains may have represented more than one structural phase.

In the interior of the building, the floor level was indicated by the hearth and slabs. Elsewhere, the floor was likely to have been of beaten earth, which is no longer recognisable due to soil mixing. There was no evidence for internal partitions.

== Transport ==
Cronberry lay on the old turnpike road from Muirkirk to Ayr. A typical Ayrshire Direction stone survives, having a pyramidal top, square on plan, but set as a diamond. These stones complemented the milestones, which on this road, acted both as distance and direction markers. The lettering and style of the milestones contrasts with the elegant and clear Direction stones.

The nearby Cronberry railway station was originally part of the Glasgow, Paisley, Kilmarnock and Ayr Railway. The station opened on 9 August 1848, and closed on 10 September 1951.

== See also ==
- George Halley
- Don Lees
- Medieval turf building in Cronberry

== Sources ==
- Hutton, Guthrie (1996). Mining. Ayrshire's Lost Industry. Catrine : Stenlake Publishing. ISBN 1-872074-88-X.
- Johnston, J. B. (1903). Place-names of Scotland. Edinburgh : David Douglas.
- Love, Dane (2003). Ayrshire : Discovering a County. Ayr : Fort Publishing. ISBN 0-9544461-1-9.
- McMichael, George (c. 1881 - 1890). Notes on the Way Through Ayrshire and the Land of Burn, Wallace, Henry the Minstrel, and Covenant Martyrs. Hugh Henry : Ayr.
