= Holehouse Junction railway station =

Railway station in East Ayrshire, Scotland

Holehouse Junction
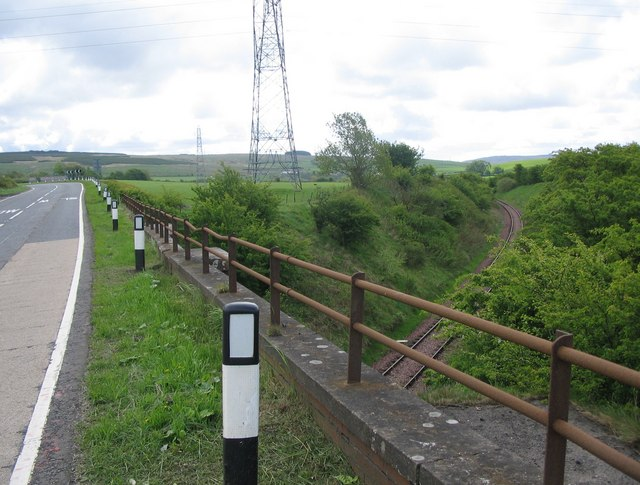
- The line south of Holehouse Junction

General information
- Location: East Ayrshire, Ayrshire; Scotland
- Coordinates: 55.3897°N 4.5173°W
- Grid reference: NS4064713525
- Platforms: 1 Island

Other information
- Status: Disused

History
- Pre-grouping: Glasgow and South Western Railway
- Post-grouping: London, Midland and Scottish Railway; British Railways (Scottish Region)

Key dates
- June 1904: Station opened
- 1937: Station renamed
- 3 April 1950: Station closed
Location

Holehouse Junction railway station was an exchange railway station in East Ayrshire, Scotland. The line on which the station later came to stand was originally part of the Ayr and Dalmellington Railway, worked and later owned by the Glasgow and South Western Railway. The station, opened as Holehouse by June 1904 was renamed in 1937 by the London, Midland and Scottish Railway. The line to Belston Junction via Rankinston opened on 1 January 1884.

== History ==
The station opened by 1904, became part of the London, Midland and Scottish Railway during the Grouping of 1923. The station then passed on to the Scottish Region of British Railways in 1948, only surviving two years into the nationalised era before closure to passengers by British Railways.

The station had an island exchange platform in the 'V' of the junction. The signalbox was to the south of the station mounted at the top of a deep cutting. From Holehouse the branchline ran east to Belston Junction. This section was closed and lifted in the 1960s, but re-laid as far as the Broomhill opencast mine site in 1998, it then fell out of use again and has been lifted. The station platforms have been demolished.

On 12 & 13 August 2000 the Branch Line Society charter was the first passenger train over the then recently re-instated freight branch to Broomhill, later the Ayrshire Railway Preservation Society ran a special to Holehouse Junction.

Preceding station	Historical railways	Following station
Connection to Ayr to Mauchline Branch	Glasgow and South Western Railway; Holehouse Junction to Ochiltree	Cairntable Halt; Line and station closed
Hollybush; Line open; station closed	Glasgow and South Western Railway; Ayr and Dalmellington Railway	Patna; Line open; station closed
