= Cross-country lines of the Glasgow and South Western Railway =

Railway lines in Scotland

The Glasgow and South Western Railway operated a number of cross-country lines in Ayrshire.

== Introduction ==
The Glasgow, Paisley, Kilmarnock and Ayr Railway (GPK&AR) opened its line from Glasgow to Ayr in 1839 - 1840, extending to Kilmarnock in 1843. The GPK&AR intended to extend to Carlisle, but in fact an allied line, the Glasgow, Dumfries and Carlisle Railway built the southern end of the route. The two railways merged in 1850, forming the Glasgow and South Western Railway (G&SWR).

At that time it owned a main line from Glasgow to Carlisle via Kilmarnock and Dumfries, and from Glasgow to Ayr and Kilmarnock. Extensions followed, and enabled the G&SWR eventually to reach Stranraer and Portpatrick, as well as Greenock and Largs. Those routes may be considered as radiating from Glasgow, with the addition of the long west-east trajectory of the Portpatrick and Wigtownshire Joint Railway and the Castle Douglas and Dumfries Railway; the development of all of these routes is traced on other pages.

An important part of the business of the G&SWR and its predecessor company was carrying minerals, chiefly ironstone and coal, and several lines were built to achieve that object. In general they cut across the radiating main lines, and are not necessarily contiguous. In order to describe the development of this group of lines, their development is brought together in this article.

== The G&SWR network in 1850 ==
At the formation of the GS&WR on 28 October 1850 it owned main lines

- from Glasgow (Bridge Street station) to Ayr;
- from Dalry to Carlisle via Kilmarnock and Dumfries;

and branches

- from Irvine to Busby (Crosshouse), with a short branch to Perceton Colliery;
- to Irvine Harbour;
- from Hurlford to Newmilns;
- the Mayfield Branch from Mayfield Junction to the Grugar Pits;
- from Kilmarnock station to Troon Harbour, mostly over the former Kilmarnock and Troon Railway; and a Fairlie Colliery branch from that line;
- from Auchinleck to Muirkirk.

== Kilmarnock and Troon ==
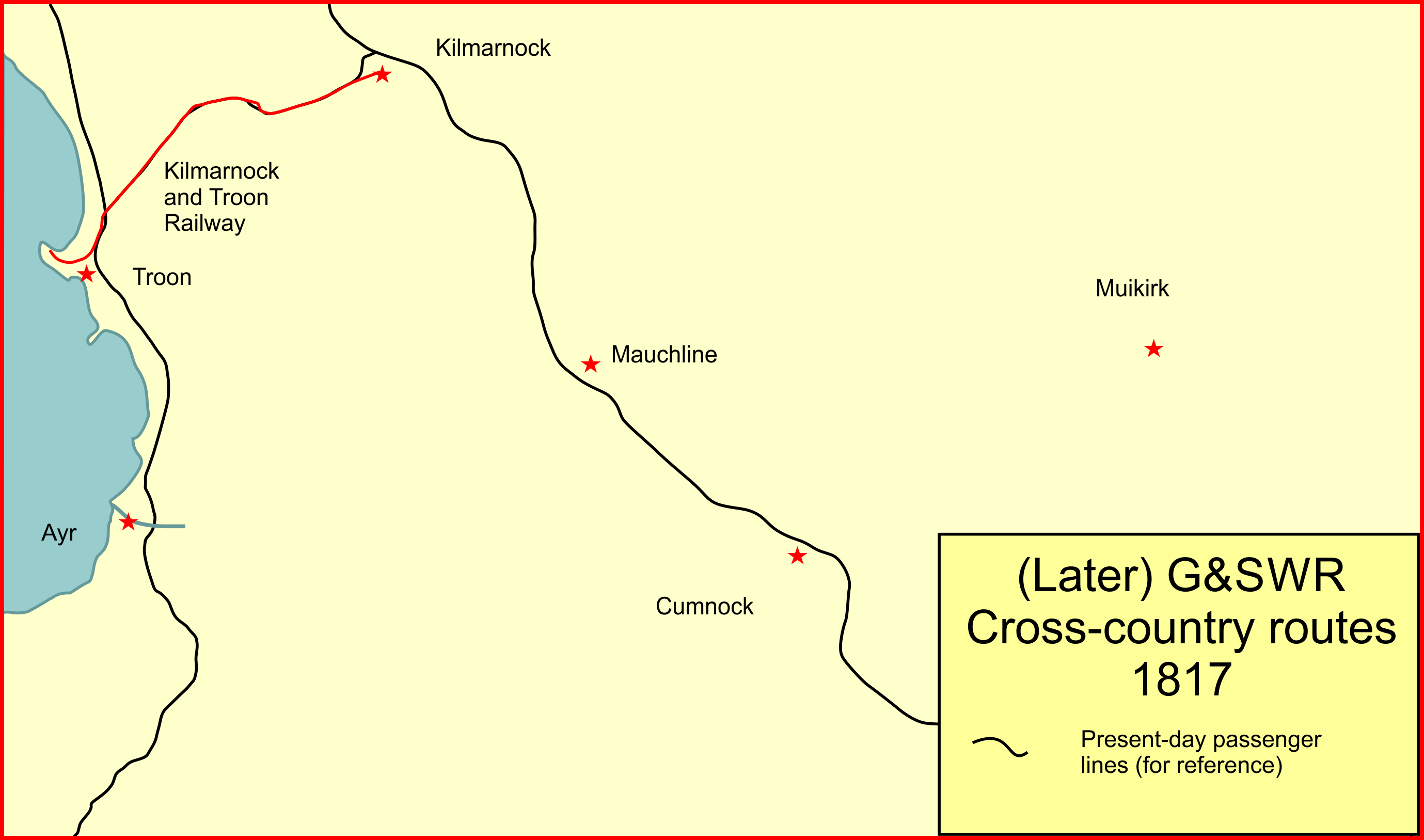
G&SWR cross-country lines in 1817

The Duke of Portland had extensive mineral deposits on his land in the vicinity of Kilmarnock. Transport of the heavy minerals to market was difficult, and this prompted the idea of building a railway to Troon Harbour, which he also owned. He did so, and the Kilmarnock and Troon Railway opened in 1812. It was a plateway, in which the "rails" were actually L-shaped plates, enabling wagons with plain wheels to run on the line, and then run on ordinary roads elsewhere. (This is in contrast to "edge rails" in which the wheels have flanges for guidance.) Independent hauliers used the line on payment of a toll; passengers were carried in the same way. Horses were used for traction, although a locomotive was tried out; the plate rails were unable to support its weight and the attempt was abandoned.

Nonetheless the line was successful, but the technical configuration was obsolete and limited development.

In 1818 a branch line from Drybridge to pits at Fairlie was opened; this was built as an edge railway on the track gauge of 3 ft 4 in (1,016 mm).

In the mid-1820s the Stockton and Darlington Railway, Liverpool and Manchester Railway and, nearer home, the Monkland and Kirkintilloch Railway showed that edge railways were technically superior, and it was decided to convert the Kilmarnock and Troon to an edge railway, enabling locomotive operation; some of the sharpest curves were eased. The conversion was complete on 27 September 1841.

In 1839 the Glasgow, Paisley, Kilmarnock and Ayr Railway (GPK&AR) opened its main line between Irvine and Ayr. They made a junction at Barassie where they intersected the K&TR.

The GPK&AR served a wide area of coal mining, and wished to get access to Troon Harbour; they took a lease of the K&TR, effective from 16 July 1846.

The following year they made a connecting line from the K&TR line to their Kilmarnock station: it ran north from a junction at St Marnock's to Thirdpart Junction, and they opened passenger stations at Gatehead and Drybridge. In 1849 they built a branch line to Fairlie Colliery, replacing the former K&TR narrow gauge line.

The line was now an intrinsic part of the GPK&AR, later G&SWR, system. The line was only leased, but at the beginning of the twentieth century the lease expired and the GS&WR bought the property outright in 1902.

In the early 1960s there were about twelve daily return passenger train journeys on the line, but it was closed completely in 1969. It was reopened on 5 May 1975, when the London to Stranraer express trains were diverted over the route.

== Irvine to Crosshouse, and Irvine Harbour branch ==
The Irvine to Busbie (Crosshouse) branch had been opened by the GPK&AR to give access for minerals to the harbours at Irvine and Ardrossan, and to access the important mineral deposits at Perceton. Passenger trains had operated from Kilmarnock to Ardrossan over the line, but it closed to passengers on 6 April 1964 and completely on 11 October 1965.

== Galston, Newmilns and Darvel ==
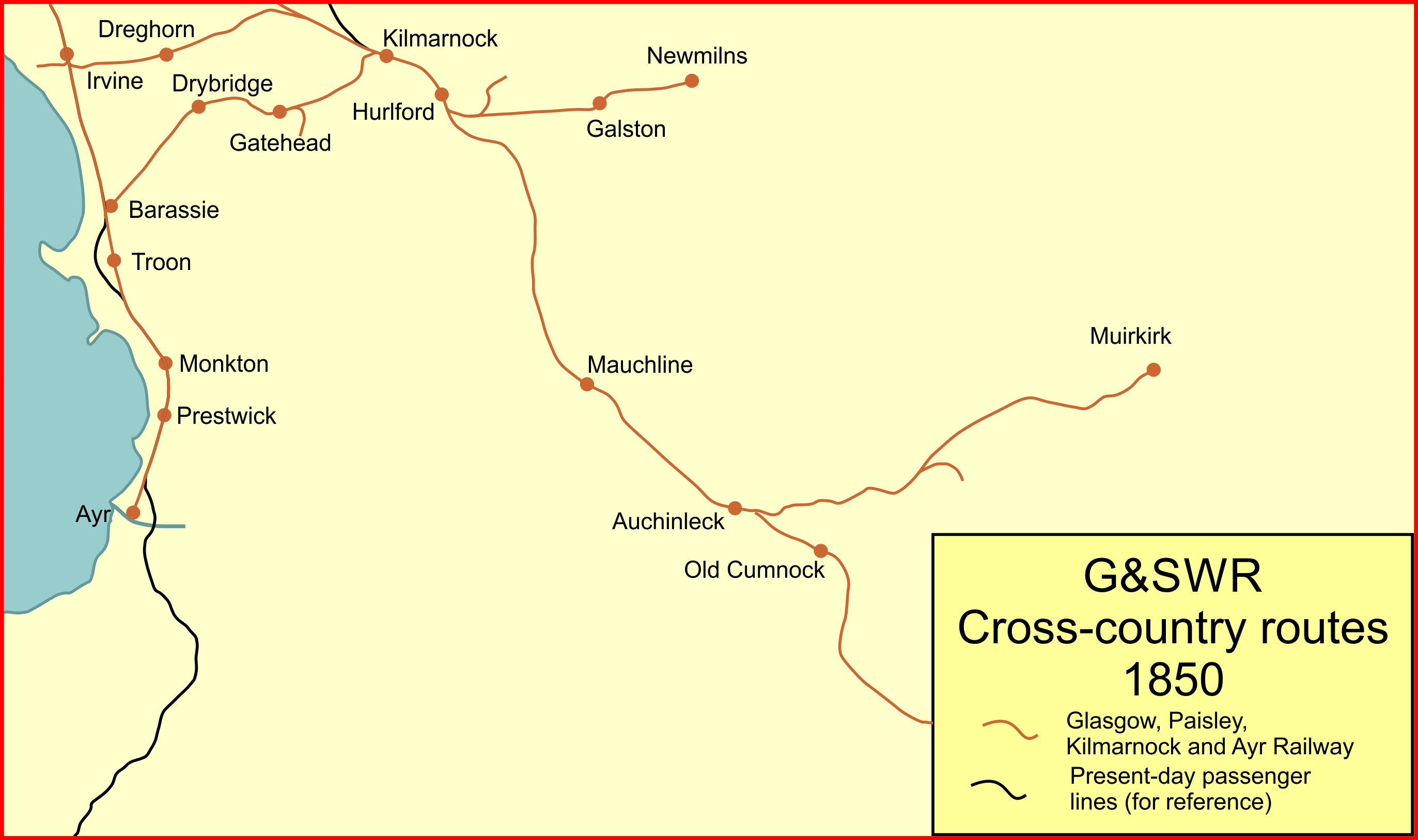
G&SWR cross-country lines in 1850

The GPK&AR opened its branch line from Hurlford (on the Kilmarnock - Mauchline line) to Galston on 9 August 1848. On 20 May 1850 that line was extended to Newmilns; it was built as a double track line, but this was obviously an overprovision, and a reduction to single track was soon ordered. In the 1870s the people of Darvel petitioned the G&SWR for extension of the line to their town; at that time the G&SWR declined, but in 1891 there was a change of heart when it was said that the Caledonian Railway (CR) was interested in extending into G&SWR territory from the east, and powers to extend were obtained. The line was opened to Darvel on 1 June 1896.

The Caledonian Railway built a line from Strathaven, where there were extensive mineral deposits, to Darvel; it opened on 1 May 1905. There were sensitivities about the CR entering Ayrshire due to a non-encroachment agreement, and the authorising act of Parliament gave the G&SWR the option of purchasing the section from Darvel to the county boundary, where exchange sidings were supposed to be built. The CR had running powers to Troon Harbour.

The G&SWR obtained an act of Parliament giving authority was obtained on 15 August 1904 for the transfer of the section from Darvel to the Ayrshire - Lanarkshire county boundary. It was passed from the CR to the G&SWR. From 1 May 1905 passenger trains ran from Darvel to Strathaven, operated alternately for six months at a time by the CR and the G&SWR. Passing through a long extent of almost unpopulated territory, the passenger service was seriously loss-making, and attempts to run a mixed train were prohibited by the Board of Trade; the service was intermittently suspended, and was never successful. It finished operation on 1 September 1939, but the stations on the line had already been closed from September to November 1909, and from January 1917 to December 1922. A Darvel to Kilmarnock passenger service ran until 6 April 1964.

=== Passing Kilmarnock ===
The heavy mineral traffic over the line passed through Kilmarnock passenger station, leading to significant congestion there, so the G&SWR promoted a direct line on the south side of Kilmarnock connecting Mayfield Junction to the Kilmarnock and Troon line. The Burgh of Kilmarnock objected to this arrangement, and to buy off their hostility the G&SWR proposed a passenger station at Riccarton, within the Burgh boundary. It is likely that the company never intended to actually run a passenger service here, and indeed they never did so. The line opened in 1902, on 14 July. (Note: It is sometimes referred to as the Gatehead and Hurlford line.)

=== Kay Park curve ===
On 6 June 1904 the G&SWR opened a curve enabling trains from Kilmarnock station (Kay Park Junction) to run direct on to that line at Bellfield Junction; this enabled direct running from the Glasgow direction (via Stewarton) towards Troon. Sometimes referred to as the Riccarton Loop, it was never used for passenger traffic.

== Muirkirk ==
The GPK&AR had opened a branch line from Auchinleck to Muirkirk in 1848. Seeking access to the town, the Caledonian Railway opened a line there from Douglas on 1 January 1873, forming an end-on junction at Muirkirk. a through passenger service had long been contemplated but it was not until 1 June 1874 that a local passenger service was operated on the CR section, and a through Ayr to Edinburgh service finally started on in 1878; it was not successful. Muirkirk to Ayr local trains ran via Drongan, but were withdrawn from 10 September 1951. The Caledonian Railway started operating passenger trains from the east from June 1874; they ran until 1964.

== Gilminscroft ==
A branch line two miles (3 km) in length had been built privately to reach Gilminscroft Colliery from Auchinleck station; on 7 August 1895 powers were obtained in an act of Parliament to acquire the line, and the transfer probably took place in 1896.

== The Annbank lines ==
=== Ayr to Mauchline ===
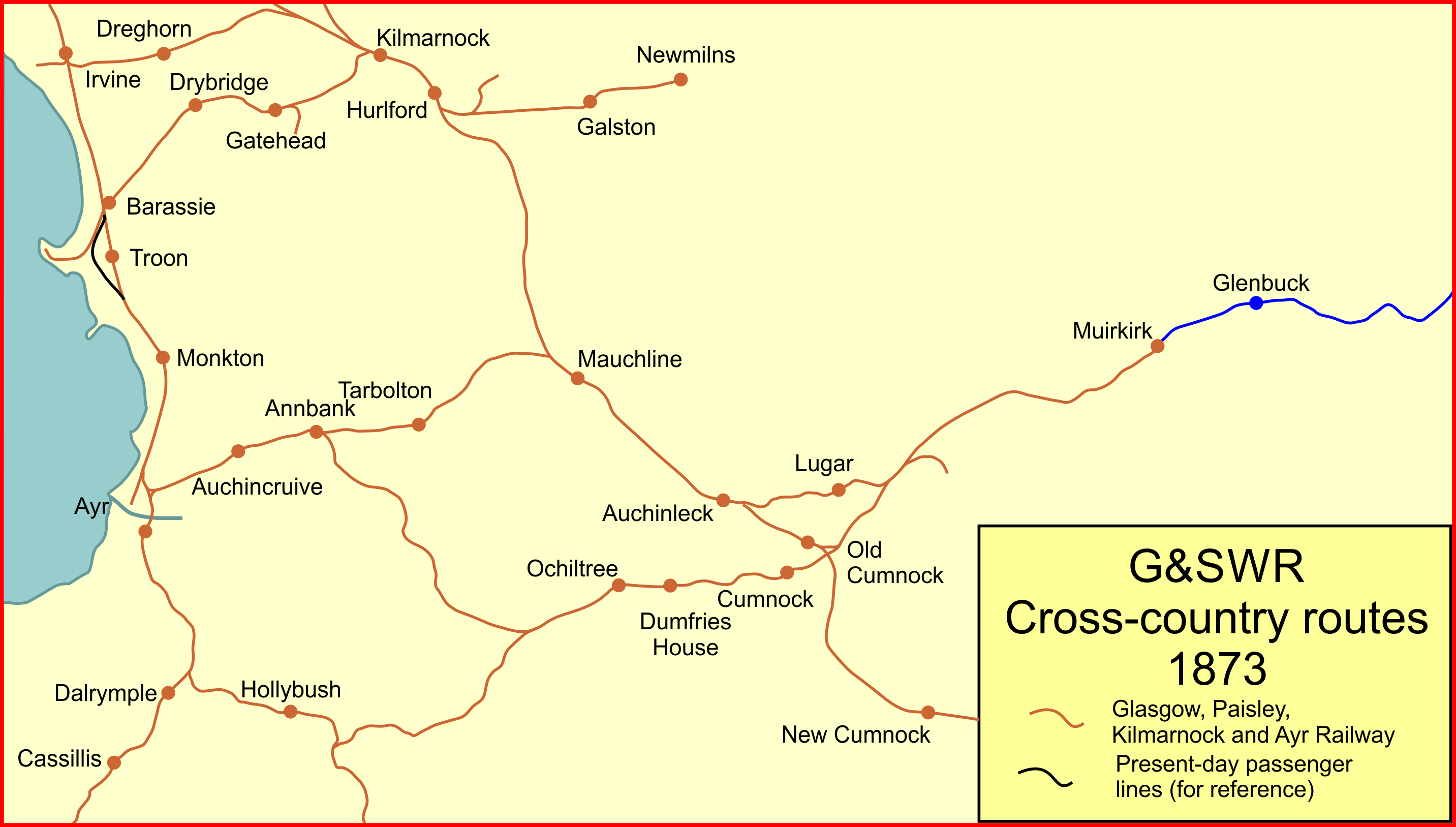
G&SWR cross-country lines in 1873

Ayr had not had a convenient rail connection towards Carlisle until on 1 September 1870 the line from Ayr to Mauchline opened. (Note: Stansfield says 1 July 1870.) It had a triangular junction at Ayr, and passenger stations at Auchincruive, Annbank and Tarbolton. On 11 June 1872 further lines opened for goods and minerals, from Annbank (on the Ayr - Mauchline line) to Cronberry (on the Auchinleck - Muirkirk line). This passed under the Kilmarnock - Mauchline main line, and the carriage of minerals was the dominant traffic. Passenger operation followed on 1 July 1872. The ordinary passenger service between Annbank and Mauchline was discontinued from 4 January 1943, although the Ayr to Annbank section continued to be served by Muirkirk trains. In October 1951 the Muirkirk line was blocked for three weeks and trains returned to the Mauchline part of the route temporarily. In the 1950s and 1960s seasonal trains from Newcastle to the Butlins holiday camp at Heads of Ayr used the route. In June 1965 the Port Road, the direct line between Dumfries and Stranraer via Newton Stewart, was closed, and the London express trains for Stranraer were diverted to run via Mauchline, Annbank and Ayr. However this was further altered from May 1975 when those trains were routed via Kilmarnock and Troon.

The Annbank to Mauchline line was closed completely in 1983, but the resurgence of coal traffic in 1988 caused it to be re-opened for coal trains.

=== Annbank to Cronberry ===
On 1 June 1872 a line was opened from Annbank to Cronberry, on the 1848 Auchinleck to Muirkirk line, for goods only at first; passenger traffic started on 1 July 1872. The very infrequent passenger service between Ayr and Muirkirk via Annbank and Cronberry was withdrawn on 10 September 1951. The Auchinleck to Cronberry section had lost its passenger service on 3 July 1950, although through trains from Edinburgh to Ayr used the route for three weeks in the autumn of 1951.

=== Belston Junction to Holehouse Junction ===
At the end of 1872 a connection was opened from Belston Junction (between Annbank and Cumnock) to Holehouse Junction on the Dalmellington line. Indicating the primacy of the mineral traffic, the connection at Holehouse Junction faced towards Dalmellington. Holehouse Junction was an exchange station only for connections between the two lines. For a period the passenger service was from Dalmellington to Rankinston, and passenger trains did not run between Rankinston and Belston Junction. The section closed to passengers on 3 April 1950.

On 3 March 1892 a further, goods-only, branch was opened from Monkton Junction, near Prestwick, to Annbank, giving direct access from the Annbank lines to Troon Harbour.

=== Monkton to Annbank ===
In 1847 the GPK&AR had opened the line between Monkton, north of Prestwick, and Mossblown Junction, between Ayr and Annbank. The line was not heavily used, but Auchincruive Colliery was located on it. In 1949 the junction at Monkton was reversed so as to face south, enabling colliery trains to run direct to Ayr Harbour. The original north-facing connection was closed at this time, and the line from Auchincruive Colliery to Mossblown Junction was also closed in 1949.

=== Killoch colliery ===
In 1959 a branch was opened to Killoch Colliery from Drongan, on the Annbank to Ochiltree line.

== Topography ==
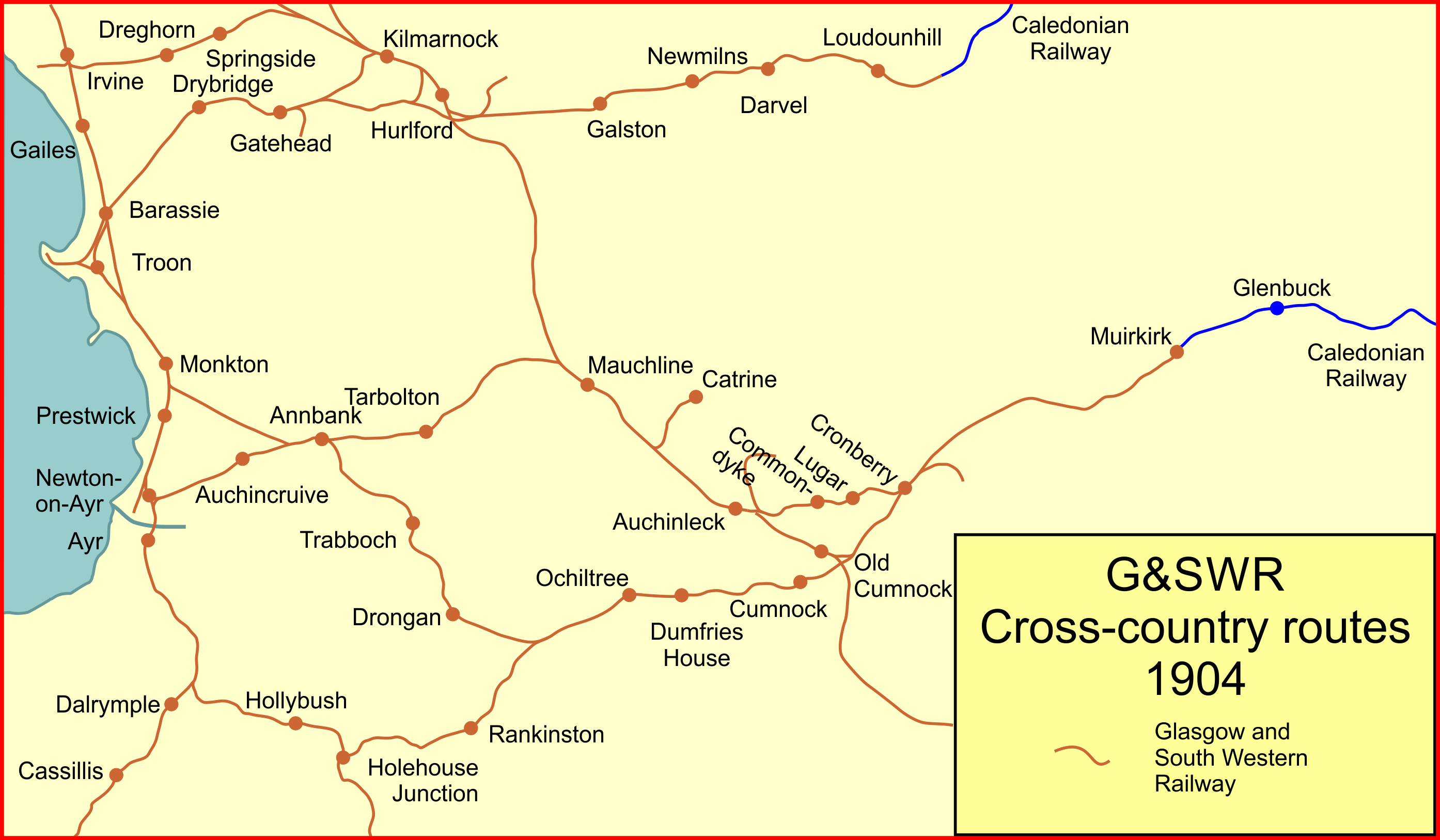
G&SWR cross-country lines in 1904

Entries in italics were not passenger stations.

=== Troon to Kilmarnock ===
- Barassie; station and junction with main line; at first simply a crossing of the plateway and the GPK&AR lines; opened June 1848 and closed August 1848; re-opened May 1850; closed October 1853; re-opened June 1859; probably only serving the Kilmarnock line until the 1859 re-opening, or possibly the Troon loop opening of 1892;
- Drybridge; opened July 1847; closed June 1848; re-opened June 1859; closed 3 March 1969;
- Gatehead; opened 1 June 1847; closed June 1848; re-opened May 1850; closed October 1853; re-opened June 1859; closed 3 March 1969;
- Thirdpart Junction for Riccarton line;
- Kilmarnock; station and junction on main line.

=== Irvine to Crosshouse ===
- Irvine; station and junction on main line;
- Dreghorn; opened 22 May 1848; closed October 1850; re-opened May 1868; closed 6 April 1964;
- Springside; opened 2 June 1890; closed 6 April 1964;
- Busby; opened September 1848; closed 15 April 1850; junction with Dalry to Kilmarnock main line; Crosshouse station was opened later, but a little nearer Kilmarnock and not directly on this line.

=== Galston, Newmilns and Darvel ===
- Hurlford; opened 9 August 1848; closed 7 March 1955; junction on Kilmarnock to Dumfries line;
- Mayfield Junction with line from Thirdpart Junction, and with line to Mayfield goods;
- Barleith; in private use by June 1904; in public timetables from June 1927; Barleith Halt 1944 to 1954; closed 6 April 1964;
- Galston; opened 9 August 1848; closed 6 April 1964;
- Newmilns; opened 20 May 1850; closed 6 April 1964;
- Darvel; opened 1 June 1896; closed 6 April 1964;
- Loudounhill; opened 1 May 1905; closed 1 July 1909; re-opened 1 November 1909; closed 1 January 1917; re-opened 4 December 1922; closed 11 September 1939;
- County Boundary Junction; end-on junction with Caledonian Railway.

=== Mayfield branch ===
- Mayfield Junction; see above;
- Mayfield goods.

=== Passing Kilmarnock ===
- Thirdpart Junction; see above;
- Riccarton; intended passenger station never opened;
- Bellfield Junction; with Kay Park curve;
- Mayfield Junction; with line from Hurlford.

=== Kay Park Curve ===
- Bellfield Junction; see above;
- Kay Park Junction; with line from Mauchline.

=== Auchinleck to Muirkirk ===
- Auchinleck; opened 9 August 1848; closed 6 December 1965; re-opened 14 May 1984; station on original GPK&AR line; later junction towards Dumfries;
- Commondyke; opened 1 October 1897; closed 3 July 1950;
- Lugar; opened January 1860; closed 3 July 1950;
- Cronberry; opened 1 May 1876; closed 10 September 1951; junction with line from Annbank;
- Muirkirk; first station; opened 9 August 1848; relocated to second station further east mid-1896;
- Muirkirk; second station; opened mid-1896; closed 5 October 1964; end on junction with Caledonian Railway.

=== Gilminscroft ===
- Gilminscroft Junction; on Auchinleck line;
- Gilminscroft Colliery.

=== Ayr to Mauchline ===
- Newton Junction; junction from Ayr dock lines and from Irvine;
- Blackhouse Junction; junction with south to east curve;
- Auchincruive; opened March 1871; closed 10 September 1951;
- Mossblown Junction; with Monkton line;
- Annbank; opened 1 September 1870; closed 10 September 1951; station and junction for Cronberry line;
- Tarbolton; opened 1 September 1870; closed 4 January 1943;
- Mauchline; opened 9 August 1848; closed 6 December 1965; station and junction on Kilmarnock to Dumfries main line.

=== South curve at Newton ===
- Hawkhill Junction; junction from Ayr station direction;
- Blackhouse Junction; see above.

=== Annbank to Cronberry ===
- Annbank; see above;
- Trabboch; opened 1 July 1896; closed 10 September 1951;
- Drongan; opened March 1875; closed 10 September 1951;
- Belston Junction; station briefly open in 1904; junction from Holehouse Junction;
- Ochiltree; opened 1 July 1872; closed 10 September 1951;
- Skares; opened 1 July 1901; closed 10 September 1951;
- Dumfries House; opened 1 July 1872; closed 13 June 1949;
- Cumnock; opened 1 July 1872; closed 10 September 1951; while this station was open, the station on the main line was called Old Cumnock;
- Lugar; opened January 1860; closed 3 July 1950;
- Cronberry [Junction]; see above; junction from Auchinleck.

=== Belston Junction to Holehouse Junction ===
- Belston Junction; see above;
- Rankinston; opened 1 January 1884; closed 3 April 1950;
- Cairntable Halt; opened 24 September 1928; closed 3 April 1950;
- Holehouse Junction; with Dalmellington line; the station opened June 1904 for exchange purposes only; closed 3 April 1950.

=== Monkton to Annbank ===
- Monkton Junction; on Troon to Ayr main line; the junction was later reversed to be south-facing;
- Mossblown Junction; on Ayr to Mauchline line.

=== Killoch Colliery ===
- Deviation from former Cronberry line at Drongan;
- Killoch Colliery.
