= Rankinston =

Coordinates: 55.398482°N 4.447875°W

- Rankinston station

- Location within East Ayrshire
- Population: 260
- OS grid reference: NS450143
- Council area: East Ayrshire
- Lieutenancy area: Ayrshire and Arran
- Country: Scotland
- Sovereign state: United Kingdom
- Post town: AYR
- Postcode district: KA6
- Police: Scotland
- Fire: Scottish
- Ambulance: Scottish
- UK Parliament: Ayr, Carrick and Cumnock
- Scottish Parliament: Carrick, Cumnock and Doon Valley

Rankinston is a village in East Ayrshire, Scotland, 3/4 mile (1.2 km) off the B730, approximately 12 miles (19 km) south east of the town of Ayr. Rankinston commands a panoramic view of over 20 miles (32 km) north, looking over the towns of Ayr, Prestwick and Troon.

During the reign of Robert the Bruce, tradesmen, merchants and farmers were encouraged from the continent to settle in Scotland in an attempt to improve the country. A Flemish family by the name of Rankin acquired the lands of Mill o'Shiel and it is thought that this is where Rankinston gets its name.

The village was built to allow the coal miners that worked in the local pits to have housing close to their work. At first these were miners' rows built by the pit owners, very basic dwellings consisting of one room and outside toilet; sometimes up to 11 members of the same family would live in this one room. During the 1920s the local council built housing of a much higher standard.

Over the years the village has gone from a farming hamlet in the 1700s, to a bustling mining village with over 800 inhabitants in 1900, to a rural outpost of just 260 inhabitants at present. The recent decline in population was due to the closure of Littlemill pit in 1974.

The village had a shop, but is now served by a mobile post office and Community Centre that is run by East Ayrshire Council, but managed by the local members of the village. There is a bus service to Ayr every two hours.
