= Ayr to Mauchline Branch =

Former railway line in Scotland

The Ayr to Mauchline Branch was a railway line in Scotland and ran services between Ayr and Mauchline as part of the Glasgow and South Western Railway.

== History ==
The line between Ayr and Mauchline opened on 1 September 1870 to regular passenger services. The line was extended south from Annbank through Ochiltree to Cronberry on 1 July 1872. A line was also opened from Ochiltree to Holehouse Junction allowing services access to and from the Ayr and Dalmellington Railway.

The section between Annbank and Mauchline closed to regular passenger services on 4 January 1943, with the remaining line between Ayr and Cronberry closing on 10 September 1951, with freight services continuing at most stations until 1964. The connecting line between Ochiltree and Holehouse had already closed to passengers on 3 May 1950. The Ayr to Mauchline line occasionally saw special passenger service use until May 1975. This line continued to be used for freight until 1983.

Today the line between Ayr and Mauchline still exists and is active after being reopened to freight traffic in March 1988. The line running south from Annbank is now cut back to Drongan, where the line that once served the Killoch Colliery now serves the Killoch Washery on the same site.

== Context ==
The context of the development of this route is discussed in the article Cross-country lines of the Glasgow and South Western Railway.

== Connections to other lines ==
- Former Glasgow, Paisley, Kilmarnock and Ayr Railway at Ayr, Cronberry and Mauchline
- Former Ayr and Dalmellington Railway at Holehouse and Ayr
