= Plaid Loch =

Coordinates: 55°26′6.2″N 4°24′3.0″W

- The location of Plaid Loch, East Ayrshire
- Location: Drongan, East Ayrshire, Scotland
- Type: Freshwater loch
- Primary inflows: Rainfall, runoff and the Belston Burn
- Primary outflows: Plaid Burn.
- Basin countries: Scotland
- Surface elevation: 145.2 m (476.5 ft)
- Settlements: Drongan

Plaid Loch (NS 485186) was a freshwater loch in East Ayrshire, now a remnant due to drainage, near Sinclairston and 2 miles (3 km) south-east of Drongan, lying in a glacial kettle hole,.

== The loch ==
Plaid Loch is one of four small lochs recorded in the 1880s, two of them artificial, within the parish of Ochiltree.

=== Barlosh Moss ===
Barlosh Moss is a Site of Special Scientific Interest (SSSI) and possesses a significant moth population. Once part of Plaid Loch, it is now marshy land that is home to carex grass, heather, juncus, pine, birch and thorn.

=== Cartographic evidence ===
Robert Gordon's map of circa 1636-52 marks the loch lying close to Belston Loch and Auchencloigh Castle, slightly the larger loch and to the north on the same watercourse. Blaeu's map of circa 1654 taken from Timothy Pont's map of circa 1600 shows Plaid Loch and a Trinmaks River as the outflow. A location recorded as Lochhill lies to the north and East Plaid is nearby. The loch is roughly circular and slightly smaller than Belston Loch.

Molls map of 1745 shows a single loch that could be either Belston or Plaid. Roy's map of 1747 does not record the loch position, however a Laigh Plaid and High Plaid are marked. Armstrong's map of 1775 shows a substantial elongated loch with a Belston and a Drumsmiden nearby and an inflow from the north coming from the vicinity of Rattenraw (Rottenrow). In 1821 a rounded loch is clearly shown, fed by burns from Ochiltree and Glenconnor. In 1832 Thomson's map shows a rounded 'Plaid' with substantial surrounding marshlands; Laigh and High Plaid are recorded.

In 1880 the loch was situated amongst extensive marshland and scrub with an outflow passing the Rottenrow area into the Burnock Water and running eventually into the Lugar Water, with an inflow from Belston Loch. Barlosh Farm lies to the west and Laigh Plaid borders the site. A small island is shown in the south-west area. The loch in 1857 had a surface area of 7.952 acres (3.218 ha) and the small island had trees upon it. Much of the surrounding land was very marshy at this time. By 1896 only the core area of the loch still had open water and the island no longer existed as an independent entity. The 1950 aerial survey appears to show that the loch had been drained to the point where no open water was present. In the 1990s only a small area of marshy wetland is shown on the OS map

== Uses ==
In 1840 and 1843 the loch was used for curling matches.

== Auchencloigh Castle ==
Auchencloigh Castle or Auchincloigh Castle (NGR NS 4945 1666) is a ruined fortification in the vicinity of Belston and Plaid Lochs near the Burnton Burn, lying within the feudal lands of the Craufurd Clan, situated in the Parish of Ochiltree, East Ayrshire, Scotland.

== Micro-history ==
John Millar, born in 1806, was a stonedyker and later a curling stone maker. He and his family lived at High Plaid (High Plyde) Farm. John died in 1889.

The area has seen extensive coal mining activity with an open cast mine and collieries at Drumsmodden, Polquhairn, Old Polquhairn, Auchlin, etc.

Early highways ran close to the loch, as indicated by names such as Glenconner, conaire being a Gaelic word for "path", and there is a farm called Rottenrow near to Glenconner, possibly derived from 'Route de Roi', or King's Highway.

== See also ==
- Kerse Loch
- Belston Loch
- Loch Shield
- South Palmerston Loch
