= Loch Shield =

Coordinates: 55°26′34.9″N 4°26′40.4″W

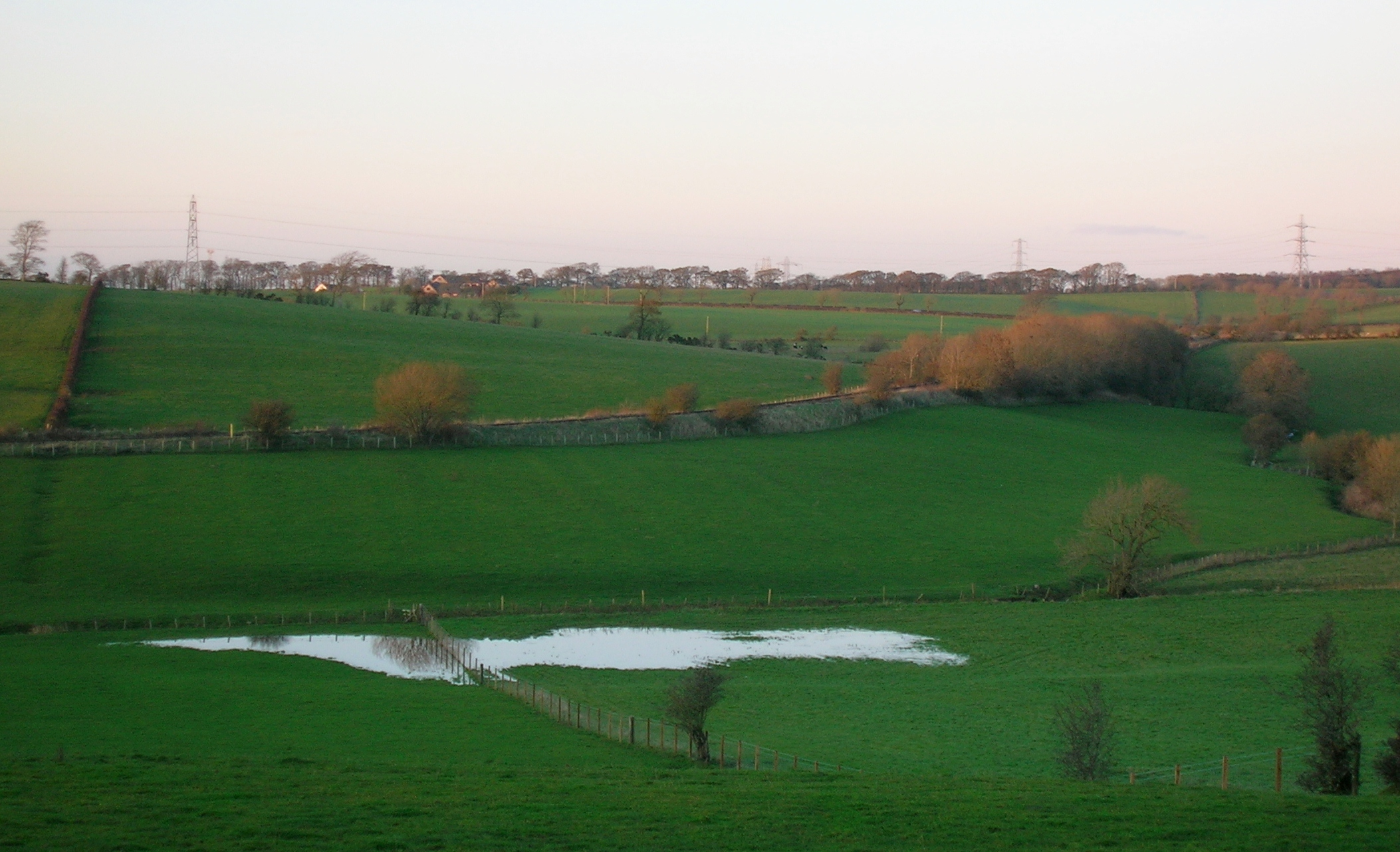
- The site of Loch Shield

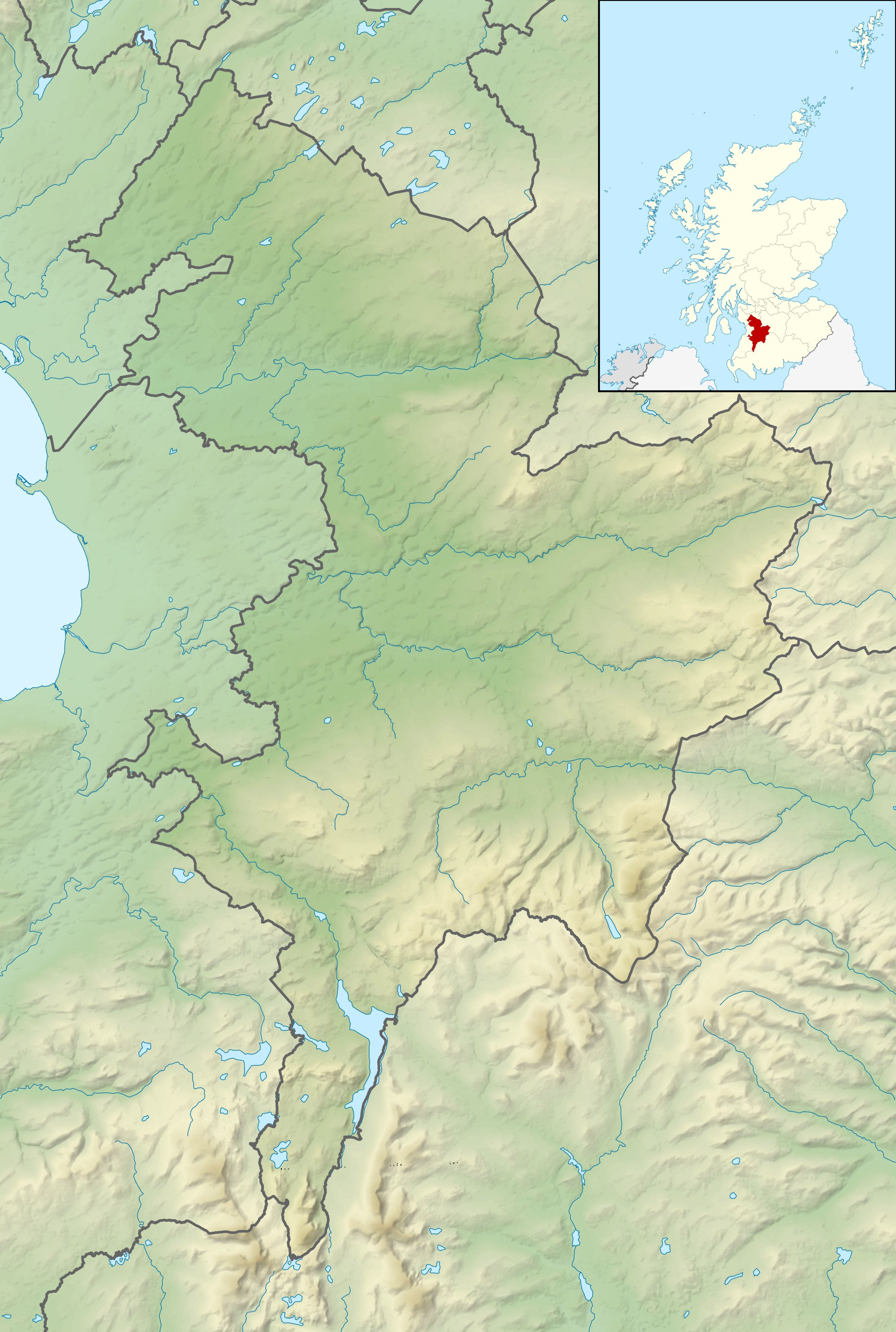
- Location within East Ayrshire
- Location: Drongan, East Ayrshire, Scotland
- Type: Freshwater loch
- Primary inflows: Rainfall and runoff
- Primary outflows: Taiglum Burn.
- Basin countries: Scotland
- Settlements: Drongan

Loch Shield (NS 45521 19444), originally Loch of Scheel was a freshwater loch in the East Ayrshire Council Area, now drained, near Drongan, lying in a glacial Kettle Hole, Parish of Ochiltree, Scotland.

== The loch ==
Loch Shield was one of several small lochs within the Parish of Ochiltree. The name Scheel relates to the nearby placename. Many of the Scots gentry once had their summer retreats, pleasantly informal places, referred to as their “shiels”, often within a mile or so of their principal residence, in this case Sundrum Castle. The name otherwise refers to a small shed or bothy, often used by fishermen.

=== Cartographic evidence ===
Robert Gordon's map of circa 1636-52 does not record the loch. Blaeu's map of circa 1654 taken from Timothy Pont's map of circa 1600 shows the Loch of Scheel with dwellings such as Trinmaks, Wereglin, and Glengabyr nearby. The dwelling named Scheel is marked near a wooded enclosure which may have been a part of the policies of the Sundrum estate at the time.

Roy's map of 1747 does not record the loch, however a Loch Mark is marked. Armstrong's map of 1775 records a placename 'Shield', but no loch or mill.

The map evidence suggests that the loch was drained in the early 18th century, although marshy ground is shown on later Ordnance Survey maps and a burn ran down to the Taiglum Burn prior to the construction of the railway.

The location of Loch Shield, East Ayrshire

== Uses ==
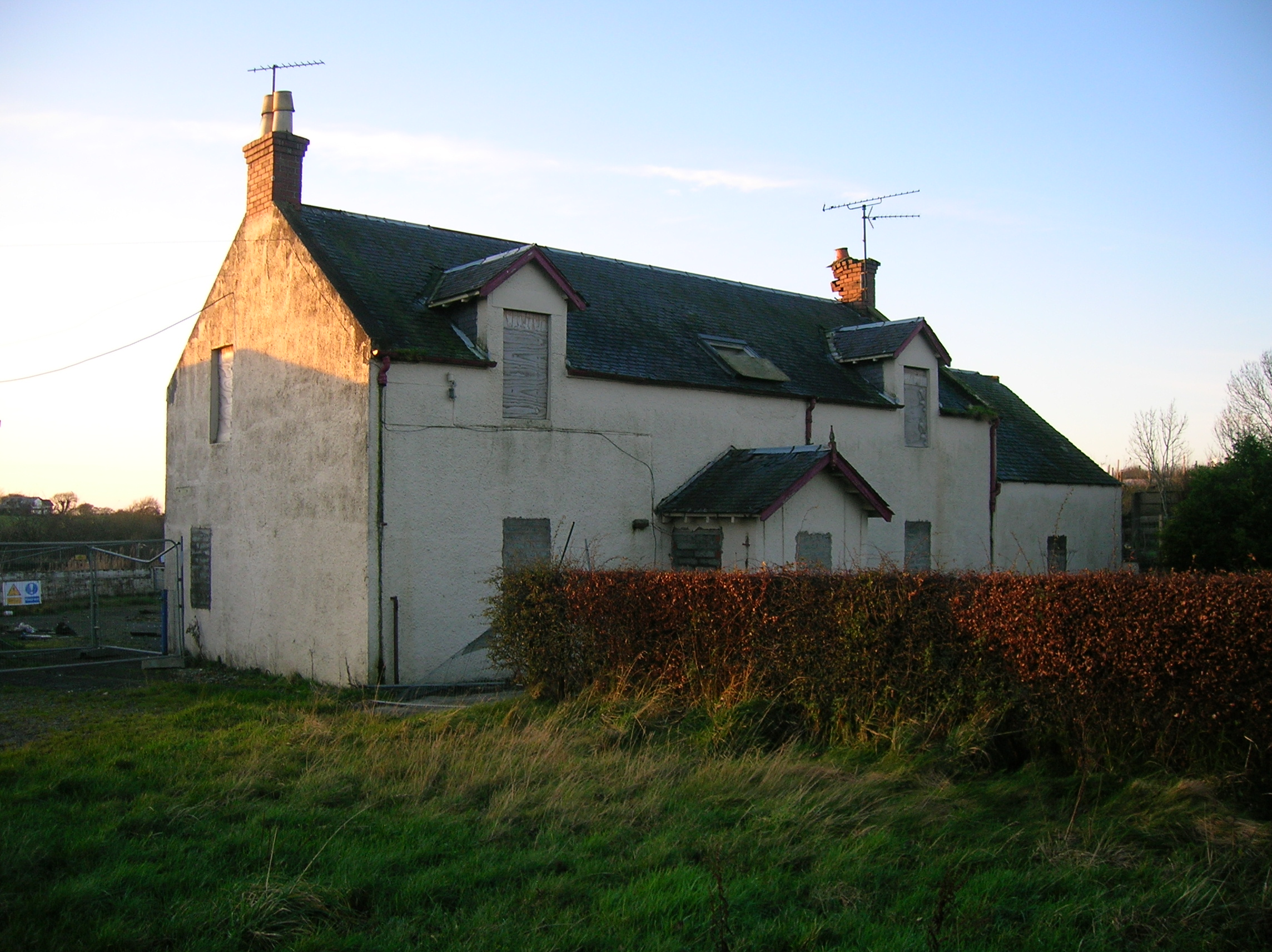
The old Mill o'Shiel Farm

First recorded in the 14th century, the Mil of Scheel (sic) is marked on Blaeu's map of circa 1654 taken from Timothy Pont's map of circa 1600, lying close to the Water of Coyle. The Mill of Shield, or Mill o'Shiel, was a corn mill, fed by a lade running from the Taiglum Burn, water being stored in a mill pond that is no longer extant. The loch's outflow water once flowed into the Taiglum Burn. The mill (NS 43800 17883) still exists in the form of a disused farm (2011).

== Micro-history ==
The area has seen extensive coal mining activity with an open cast mine and collieries, such as the one at North Barbeth.

Drongan House lies close to the site of the old loch and indeed a part of the building is known as Lochmark House, previously a farm in its own right.

A Mill of Shield Road runs through the nearby housing estate.

== See also ==
- Kerse Loch
- Belston Loch
- Plaid Loch
- South Palmerston Loch
