= South Palmerston Loch =

Coordinates: 55°26′47.6″N 4°21′48.2″W

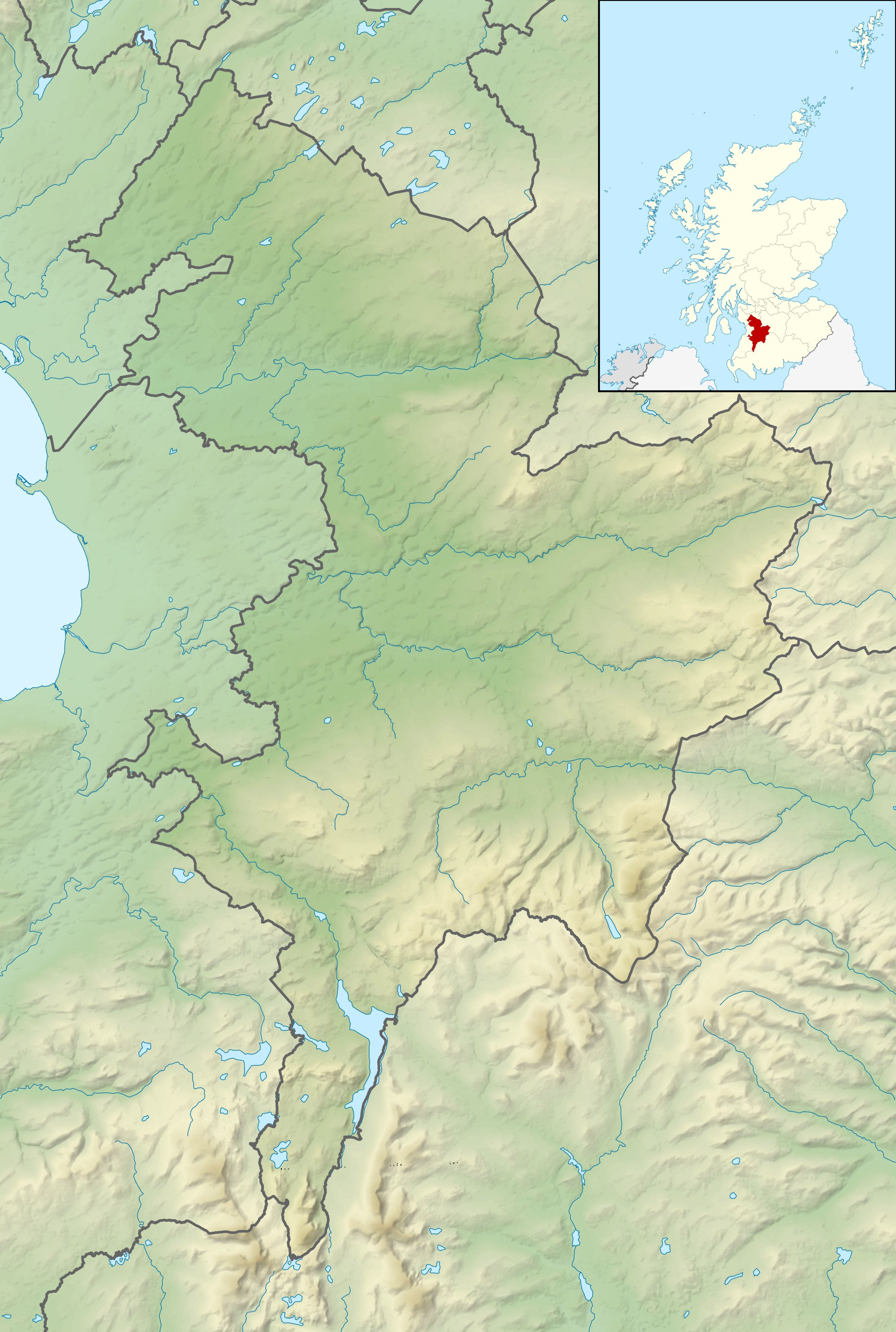
- Location within East Ayrshire
- Location: Ochiltree, East Ayrshire, Scotland
- Type: Previously a freshwater loch
- Primary inflows: Unnamed burn, rainfall and runoff
- Primary outflows: Palmerston Burn
- Basin countries: Scotland
- Settlements: Ochiltree

South Palmerston Loch or Flush, previously known as Loch of the Hill, lying to the east of the 500 ft (152 m) Back hill Mount. It was one of several small lochs within the Parish of Ochiltree. The loch, lying in a glacial kettle hole, drained into the Lugar Water via the Burnock Water.

== Cartographic evidence ==
Blaeu's map of circa 1654 taken from Timothy Pont's map of circa 1600 shows a Loch of the Hill lying near a Jackson, with an outflow running into the Lugar Water after passing through the grounds of the Auchinleck estate.

Roy's map of 1747 records the loch position, with a Bogbrae and Boghead on higher ground to the south. The loch was present in 1857, lying below Back hill Farm and mount. Much of the higher land to the south was very marshy at this time. The 1872 OS shows the loch as open water. In 1897 the loch is marked as a curling pond, seasonally flooded and remains so until circa 1910. In the 1920s the loch is shown as a marshy area with no open water, fed by a burn running down from near Ochiltree railway station. The 1950 aerial survey appears to show that the loch had been drained with only a small area of open water present. In the 1990s only a small area of wetland is shown on the OS map.

The location of South Palmerston Loch, East Ayrshire

== Uses ==
The Royal Caledonian Curling Club records that curling matches took place on the loch in February 1857 and 1860.

== Micro-history ==
Early highways ran close to the loch, as indicated by names such as the nearby Glenconner Farm, 'conaire' being a Gaelic word for "path". There is also a farm called Rottenrow near Glenconner, possibly derived from 'Route de Roi', or King's Highway.

== See also ==
- Kerse Loch
- Belston Loch
- Plaid Loch
- Loch Shield
