= Auchencloigh Castle =

Ruined fortification in the Parish of Ochiltree, East Ayrshire, Scotland

- Auchencloigh, East Ayrshire, Scotland; UK grid reference NS49451666
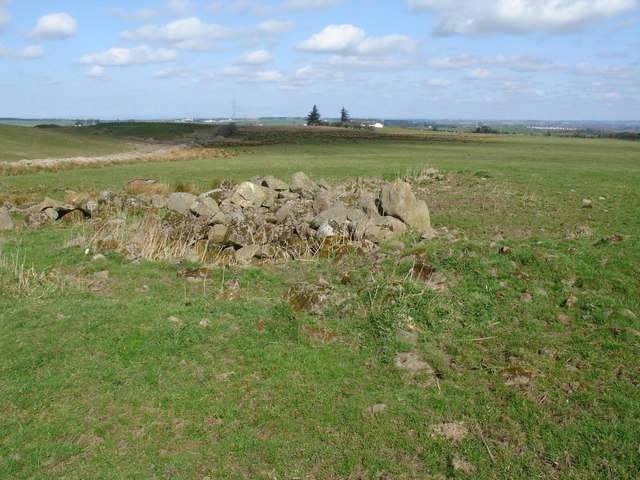
- Site of Auchencloigh Castle

Site information
- Controlled by: Craufurd clan
- Open to the public: No
- Condition: whin and lime mortar remains

Location
- Location within East Ayrshire
- Coordinates: 55.4207°N 4.3803°W

Site history
- Built: 15th century
- In use: Until early 18th century
- Materials: Stone

Auchencloigh Castle or Auchincloigh Castle (NGR NS 4945 1666 ) is a ruined fortification near the Burnton Burn, lying within the feudal lands of the Craufurd Clan, situated in the Parish of Ochiltree, East Ayrshire, Scotland.

== Auchencloigh Castle ==
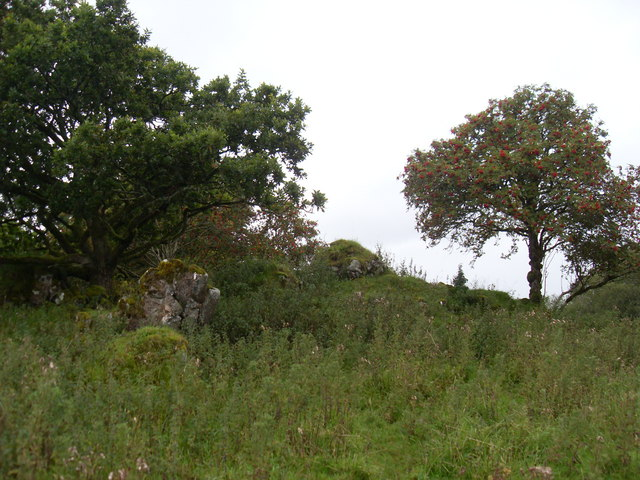
Ruins at Auchencloigh

No description or accurate pictorial representation of Auchencloigh castle seems to have survived. The site of the castle is on a mound and in 1978 some of its walls were standing at a height of between 0.6 and 1.6m and several feet in thick in a few places. The walls formed a rectangle and the interior seems to have been subdivided into several small rooms.

Auchencloigh may once have been part of a chain of fortalices forming a defensive line, including Drongan and Martnaham castles.

The ruins of this medieval tower are of whinstone, were lime mortared and lie 100 metres to the east of the Auchencloigh Farm. No dating evidence has been found, however, an early date is suggested by the thickness of the walls. A 15th-century date has been suggested by one author.

Auchincloigh Farm was located nearby with a belt of woodland. The site of the castle is scheduled under the Ancient Monuments and Archaeological Areas Act 1979.

A William Wallace of Auchincloych was a witness to a precept by James Lord Torphicen in favour of John Chalmer of Inchgotrick in 1579.

In 1578 William and James Cuninghame of Polquharne (sic) granted the lands of Burntoun within their lands of Easter Polquharne to John Cuninghame, son of the said James. These lands were contiguous or inclusive of Auchencloigh.

== Cartographic evidence ==
Robert Gordon's map of circa 1635–52 marks the castle of E. Achincloich (sic) to the East of Belston Loch. The Blaeu map of circa 1654 taken from Timothy Pont's map of circa 1600 shows an intact East Achincloich Castle (sic), smaller than the nearby Kerse Castle, with wooded grounds, a pale or fence to the south and bounded to the north, west and east by water courses. A Drumsmodda Loch lay to the west, now known as Belston Loch. A West Achincloich dwelling is also shown.

Moll's map of 1745 shows a dwelling at Achincloich (sic) lying to the east of a small loch, but no castle. Roy's map of 1747 records an Achincloich, not as a castle. Armstrong's map of 1775 shows an Auchencloigh Castle as a ruin. In 1821 the castle is clearly shown as a ruin. In 1820 Thomson's map shows an Auchencloigh (castle ruins).

== Micro history ==
The area around the site of the castle and old farm was the site of a large opencast mine, however it is now restored to agricultural use.

The name derives from the Gaelic achadh meaning field and cloiche meaning stone. The placenames 'Auchencloich' and 'Auchencloy' are found elsewhere in Scotland. A hamlet named Auchencloigh is located in the parish of Sorn. Auchencloigh Lodge is a house located on the entrance drive to the old farm.

There is a clearly defined 17th-century type holloway that follows the Roman road as far as Auchencloigh near to Old Polquhairn, probably the same road shown on Armstrong's map of 1775 running from Bank (present Bankglen on the New Cumnock - Dalmellington road) over to the present Littlemill. It has a heavy cobbled bottom with clay on top.

== See also ==
- Belston Loch
- Kerse Castle, East Ayrshire
