= Drongan, Stair and Rankinston (ward) =

Scottish electoral ward

- East Ayrshire
- Electorate: 3,079 (2003)
- Major settlements: Drongan
- Scottish Parliament constituency: Carrick, Cumnock and Doon Valley
- Scottish Parliament region: South Scotland
- UK Parliament constituency: Ayr, Carrick and Cumnock

1999–2007
- Number of councillors: 1
- Replaced by: Cumnock and New Cumnock; Doon Valley
- Created from: Drongan, Ochiltree, Rankinston and Stair; Patna and Dalrymple

Drongan, Stair and Rankinston was one of 32 electoral wards of East Ayrshire Council. Created in 1999, the ward elected one councillor using the first-past-the-post voting electoral system.

The ward was a Labour Co-operative stronghold as the party successfully held the seat at every election. Thomas Farrell was the only councillor elected as he represented the ward from 1999 to 2007.

In 2007, the ward was abolished and replaced by the multi-member Doon Valley ward as council elections moved to a proportional voting system – the single transferable vote – following the implementation of the Local Governance (Scotland) Act 2004.

== Boundaries ==
The Drongan, Stair and Rankinston ward was created in 1999 by the Third Statutory Reviews of Electoral Arrangements from the previous Drongan, Ochiltree, Rankinston and Stair ward and a small area of the Patna and Dalrymple ward. The ward took in a rural area around the villages of Drongan, Rankinston and Stair and took in an area in the west of East Ayrshire next to its border with South Ayrshire Council. In 2007, the ward was abolished as the Local Governance (Scotland) Act 2004 saw proportional representation and new multi-member wards introduced. The majority of the area covered by the Drongan, Stair and Rankinston ward was placed into the new Doon Valley ward and an area in the east of the ward was placed in the Cumnock and New Cumnock ward.

== Councillors ==
Election	Councillor
1999	T. Farrell

== Election results ==
=== 2003 election ===
Drongan, Stair and Rankinston
Party	Candidate	Votes	%	±%
Labour Co-op	Thomas Farrell	982	65.1	▼8.5
SNP	John MacAulay	251	16.6	▼9.8
Conservative	James Hume	180	11.9	New
Independent	Robert Shennan	96	6.4	New
Majority		731	48.4	▲1.1
Turnout		1,509	49.0	▼11.9
Registered electors		3,079		
Labour Co-op hold		Swing	▲0.6	

=== 1999 election ===
Drongan, Stair and Rankinston
Party	Candidate	Votes	%
Labour Co-op	T. Farrell	1,338	73.6
SNP	J. Keirs	479	26.4
Majority		859	47.3
Turnout		1,817	60.9
Registered electors		3,084	
Labour Co-op win (new seat)			
