= Belston Loch =

Lake in east Ayrshire, Scotland

Coordinates: 55°25′10″N 4°24′37″W

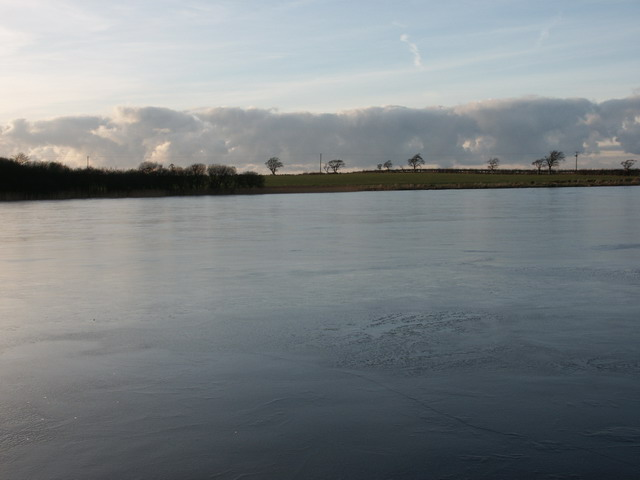
- A view from the centre of Belston Loch

- The location of Belston Loch, East Ayrshire
- Location: Ochiltree, East Ayrshire, Scotland
- Lake type: Freshwater loch
- Primary inflows: Polquharn Burn, rainfall and runoff
- Primary outflows: Taiglum Burn.
- Basin countries: Scotland
- Settlements: Ochiltree

Belston Loch (NS 34894 16186), also recorded as Dromsmodda Loch is a small freshwater loch in the East Ayrshire Council Area, near Sinclairston, 2 miles (3.2 km) south-east of Drongan, lying in a glacial Kettle Hole. Parish of Ochiltree, Scotland.

== The loch ==
Belston Loch in the 1880 is recorded as being 400m x 300m, the largest of four small lochs, two of them artificial, within the Parish of Ochiltree. Otherwise surrounded by farmland, the south-west area has a few hectares of woodland adjoining the lochshore.

=== Etymology ===
Recorded as Drumsmodda Loch in circa 1654, a Drumsmodden Farm is still extant. The Celtic name may survive in the name Polquhairn or Quhairn Pool.

=== Cartographic evidence ===
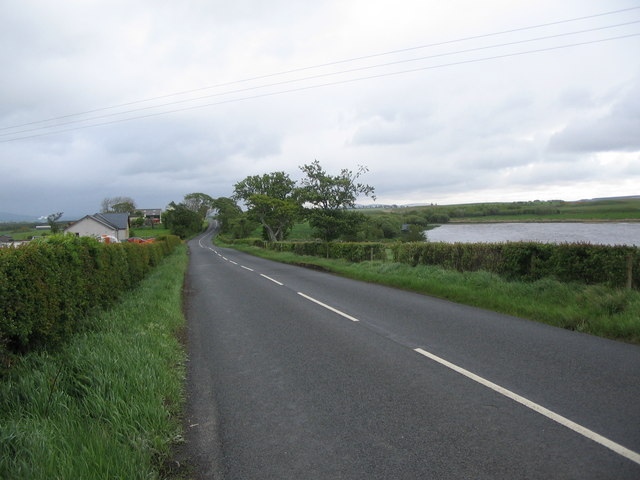
A view looking northeast along the B7046 towards Belston, with Belston Loch at right

Robert Gordon's map of circa 1636-52 marks the loch and Auchencloigh Castle nearby., located on the Taiglum Burn. Blaeu map of circa 1654 taken from Timothy Pont's map of circa 1600 shows a Drumsmodda Loch (sic) and nearby Auchencloigh Castle (sic) with significant grounds and woodland. A location recorded as Belstain is nearby. Molls map of 1745 shows a single loch that may be Belston. Roy's map of 1747 records the loch position. Armstrong's map of 1775 shows a substantial loch with a Belstoun and a Drumsmiden nearby. In 1821 the loch is clearly shown. In 1832 Thomson's map shows 'Belton Loch' with an inflow burn from Polquhairn.

== Uses ==
The loch is part of Mauchline & Ballochmyle Angling Club; it holds some large rainbow, brown trout, and has some pike.

Curling matches are recorded as having taken place at the loch and a Belston Curling Club existed in the early 20th century. Wattie Young of Polquhairn held the club's minutes book.

== Auchencloigh Castle ==
Auchencloigh Castle or Auchincloigh Castle (NGR NS 4945 1666) is a ruined fortification in the vicinity of Belston Loch near the Burnton Burn, lying within the feudal lands of the Craufurd Clan, situated in the Parish of Ochiltree, East Ayrshire, Scotland.

== Micro-history ==
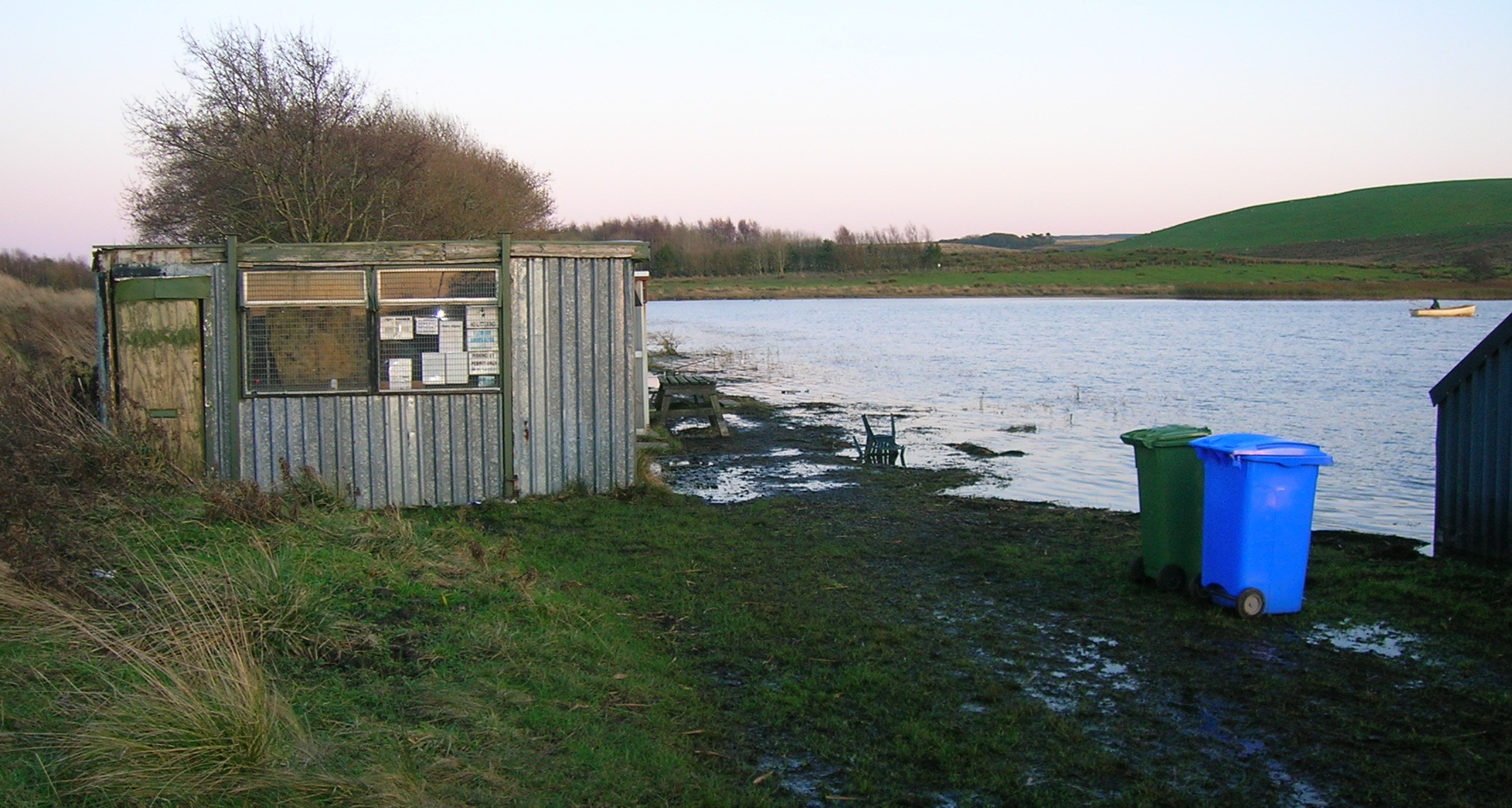
Fishing club hut

The area has seen extensive coal mining activity with an open cast mine and collieries at Drumsmodden, Polquhairn, Old Polquhairn, Auchlin, etc.

George Douglas Brown's father lived at Drumsmodden Farm. George was the author of The House with the Green Shutters.

Early highways ran close to the loch, as indicated by names such as Glenconner, conaire being a Gaelic word for "path", and there is a farm called Rottenrow near to Glenconner, possibly derived from 'Route de Roi', or King's Highway.

== See also ==
- Kerse Loch
- Plaid Loch
