= Kerse Castle, East Ayrshire =

Ruined fortress in Scotland

Kerse Castle
- Kerse, East Ayrshire, Scotland; UK grid reference NS4084831699
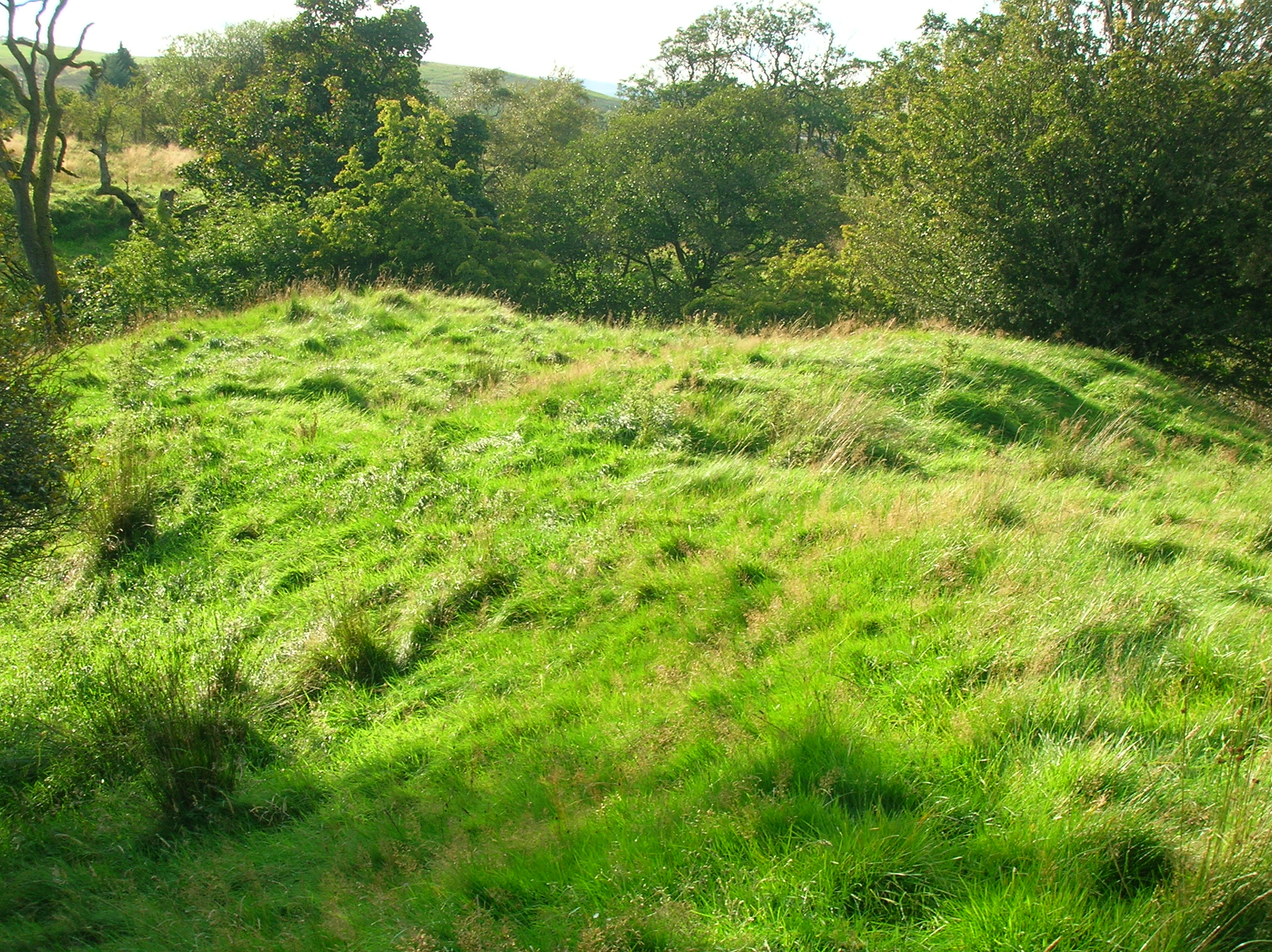
- Possible site of the Kerse tower castle

Site information
- Controlled by: Craufurd clan
- Open to the public: No
- Condition: No remains

Location
- Location within East Ayrshire
- Location within East Ayrshire
- Coordinates: 55.396°N 4.467°W
- Grid reference: grid reference NS438141

Site history
- Built: 13th century
- In use: Until 17th century
- Materials: Stone

Kerse Castle or Carse Castle (NGR NS 4385 1413 ) is a ruined fortification once held by the Craufurd Clan, situated in the Parish of Dalrymple, East Ayrshire, Scotland.

== Kerse Castle ==
No descriptions or accurate pictorial representations of Kerse Castle have survived. The site of the estate is identifiable through the presence beside the Bow Burn of dykes and ditches, building platforms, apple trees, non-native planned policy plantings such as beech and horse-chestnut, nettles marking refuse dumps, evidence from old maps, march dykes, and place names evidence (Kerse Bridge & cottage), etc. The now abandoned Holehouse Railway Branchline was built through the top section of the site and this has both damaged it and introduced possible anomalies.

Kerse Castle was dismantled for use in the building of Skeldon House around 1760. On the night of 29 December 1797, a raging storm brought down the remaining wall of the old castle.

== Cartographic evidence ==
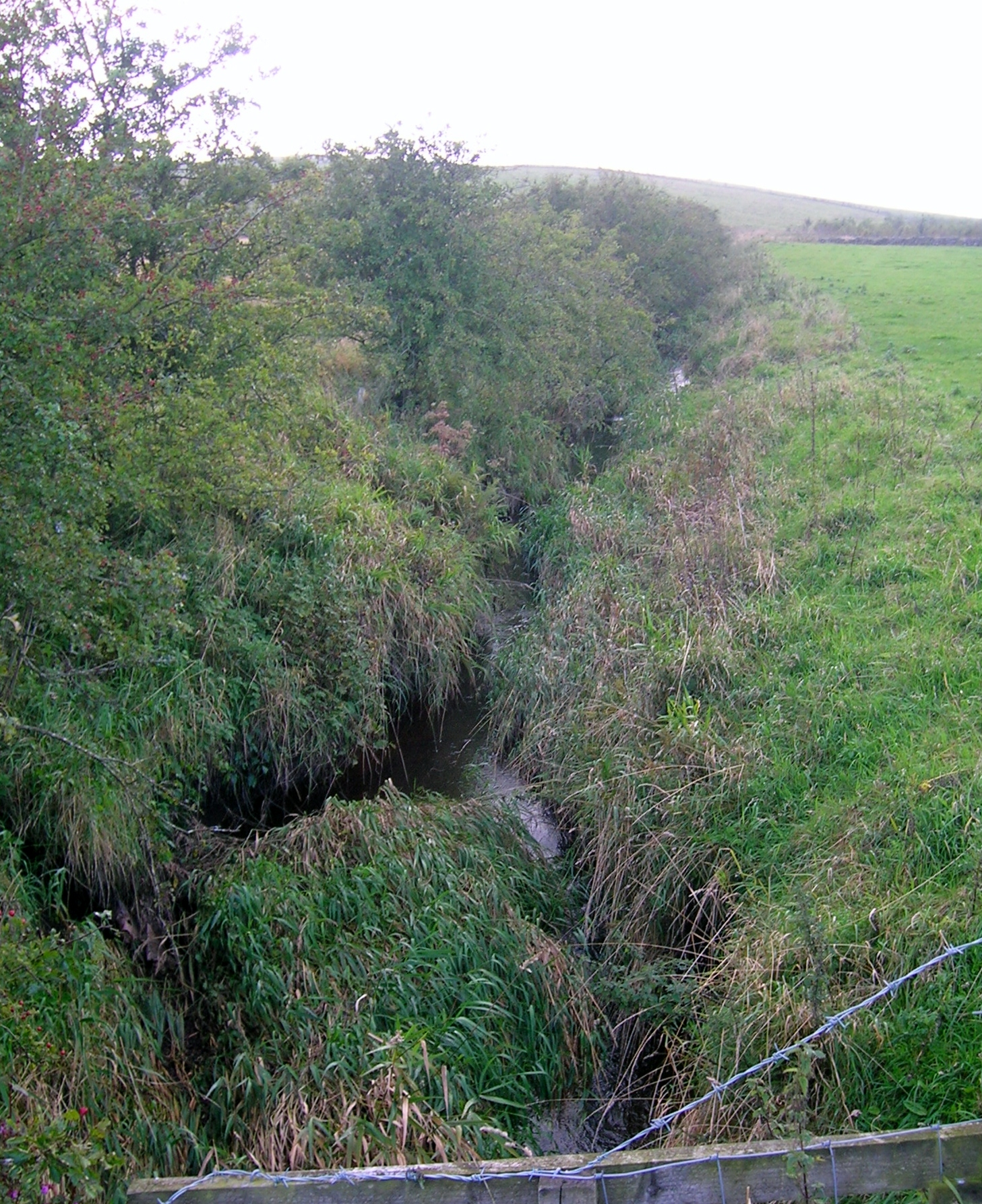
The Kerse Burn near the old Kerse Tileworks draining the loch

Robert Gordon's map of circa marks the castle of Cars (sic) near the loch. The Blaeu map of circa 1654 taken from Timothy Pont's map of circa 1600 shows Cars Castle (sic) with substantial grounds and woodland. Molls map of 1745 shows the castle lying to the east of the loch. Roy's map of 1747 records the castle as Carse, again located to the east of the loch. In 1821 the loch is clearly shown and 'Kerse' is shown towards the Sundrum Water. In 1832 Thomson's map shows a 'Carse' dwelling on a road to the east.

== Family history ==
The Craufurds of Kerse were a cadet branch of the Craufurds of Loudoun, and ultimately became the representatives of the Dalmagregan Crawfords, carrying in their armorial bearings a stag’s head, as did also the Craufurds of Drumsoy and the Craufurds of Comlarg. The spelling 'Craufurd' is adopted here.

Reginald was the first of the Kerse family, being a son of Hugh Craufurd of Loudoun. The land grant came from his brother Hugh in the reign of Alexander III of Scotland (4 September 1241 – 19 March 1286). References occur to several members of the family occur in the reigns of James the First and Fourth, including several Esplin's. In 1508, David Craufurd of Kerse, David his son, John Craufurd, ‘proctour,’ Esplane Craufurd, and seven others were fined for hindering the sitting of the bailliary court of Carrick. The laird of Kerse himself had to pay five pounds, and the others paid four shillings each.

On 5 October 1527, Bartholomew Craufurd of Kerse; David and Duncan his brothers; George Craufurd of Lochnorris, and William his brother; John Craufurd of Drougan, John and William his sons, with many others, were cautioned for helping Hugh Campbell of Loudoun, sheriff of Ayr, in the cruel slaughter of Gilbert, Earl of Cassillis. This incident was known as the 'Raid of Loudoun'.

The grandson of Bartholomew, David Craufurd of Kerse, only had a daughter and on his death in 1600, he was succeeded by Alexander Craufurd of Balgregan in Galloway as the closest male heir; he was descended from a son of David, the brother of Bartholomew, and titled 'of Culnorris and Balgregan'. The original lands of Kerse appear to have then passed to the next heir, probably of the Comlarg family. In 1680, Alexander Craufurd of Kerse inherited the lands of Nether Skeldon from his father Alexander Craufurd of Kerse.

Alexander Craufurd was the last male Craufurd proprietor of Kerse as his heir, a daughter named Christian Crawford of Kerse, married a Mr. Moodie. The couple had no offspring and she passed the lands of Kerse to William Ross of Sandwick. The Ross family built Skeldon House circa 1760. The estate of Kerse then passed to his children who sold it to the Oswalds of Auchencruive, with whom it still remained into the 19th century.

Other family details

John McDougall of Logan who died in 1618 is recorded to have Margaret Craufurd of Kerse. Edward Henry John Craufurd (9 December 1816 – 29 August 1881) was a Scottish Radical politician, eldest son of John Craufurd of Auchenames and Kerse in the counties of Renfrewshire and Ayr, Treasurer General of the Ionian Islands, and Sophia Marianne Churchill, daughter of Major General Churchill and great-granddaughter of Sir Robert Walpole. Margaret Craufurd of Cumlarg, daughter of Captain John Craufurd of Camlarg, son of Craufurd of Kerse.

Joanna Livingston (widow of Hon John Livingston, Master of Livingston) married David Craufurd of Kerse at some point before November 1567. William Cunynghame of Milncraig, son of William Cunyngham, 1st of Milncraig, married the daughter of David Craufurd of Kerse in the early 17th century.

In a "charge aganis Personis vnder Deidlie Feid" dated 1595, Robert, Master of Eglinton and Patrick Houston of that Ilk were required to appear personally before the King and council at Holyrood House. One of the friends that were permitted to accompany Patrick was a Craufurd of Kerse.

=== Coat of arms ===
The coat of arms of Crawford of Kerse is recorded as 'Argent (silver), a stag’s head erased Gules (red)'. The term 'erased' in heraldly is anything which appears forcibly torn off, leaving the edges jagged and uneven.

== Ayrshire stories and legends ==
=== The Craufurds of Kerse ===
"The Craufurds of Kerse were ever a lawless family. Their domains were wide, and their influence, wider still. David Craufurd had only to send out his messengers, and replies came in, in the guise of horsemen and of footmen, from a range of country stretching from the upper waters of the Irvine to the mid-waters, of the Ayr, and reaching from these to where the Doon washed the domains of the Kennedys. The Craufurds played an important part in the national history. Sir Reginald Craufurd, the uncle of Sir William Wallace, was one of their forebears, and for a long series of years they held the hereditary sheriffship of Ayr. But they were feudal, and the Kerse of the early days of the sixteenth century, the chieftain of the house of Craufurd and the acknowledged leader of the men of Kyle when their interests were threatened, was never more at home than when, in the saddle, he raided the lands of Carrick, or turned his arms against the Montgomeries of Eglinton. He is waiting in court to stand trial, but ere he is called to appear at the bar, one of his followers, John Shaw, is examined on two separate indictments. He had slain with a stone a certain John Boyd, whether a scion of the house of Boyd or a man of no recognized family, we do not know. In all probability the latter, for the case is soon disposed of. Craufurd offers himself a surety to satisfy the parties, and his suretyship is accepted as a matter of course. But Shaw had performed a more serious and compromising action. Duncan Fergusson, the young laird of Kilkerran, bad been residing at Burnfoot, and thither Shaw had gone at the head of a party of the retainers of Kerse. They had broken down the walls of the dwelling and wasted it, and for the space of a year they had made periodical incursions on the lands of Burnfoot, and destroyed every attempt to cultivate them; and to fill the cup of their vengeance, they had set upon one of the servants of the laird of Kilkerran with their swords, and had cruelly done him to death. But it was all in pursuance of hereditary struggle, and in conformity with the unwritten, yet fully recognized, laws of the blood feud; and therefore, when Craufurd offers again to become surety, Lord Gray interposes no objection, and Shaw rejoins his friends."

"Kerse was displeased that Lord Eglinton should hold the office of bailie. He had no territorial influence in Carrick, and while Craufurd had none himself, for many miles and by many a stretch of the winding Doon his lands looked across to those of the baillary. And so it had come about that, while the Earl held court, the Craufurds, present in force, had so conducted themselves that the magistrate had not dared to adjudicate upon the affairs of Kilhenzie. Surely a serious offence, thus cavalierly to interfere with one of the judicatures of the country! Well, it may have been, but if a judgment on the regard in which the misdemeanour was held may be gauged by the sentence, it can hardly be that Lord Gray was inclined to see in it anything worse than an ordinary feudal offending. Kerse was fined in five pounds Scots, and the members of his family and his followers in forty shillings each."

Views of Kerse Castle and policies

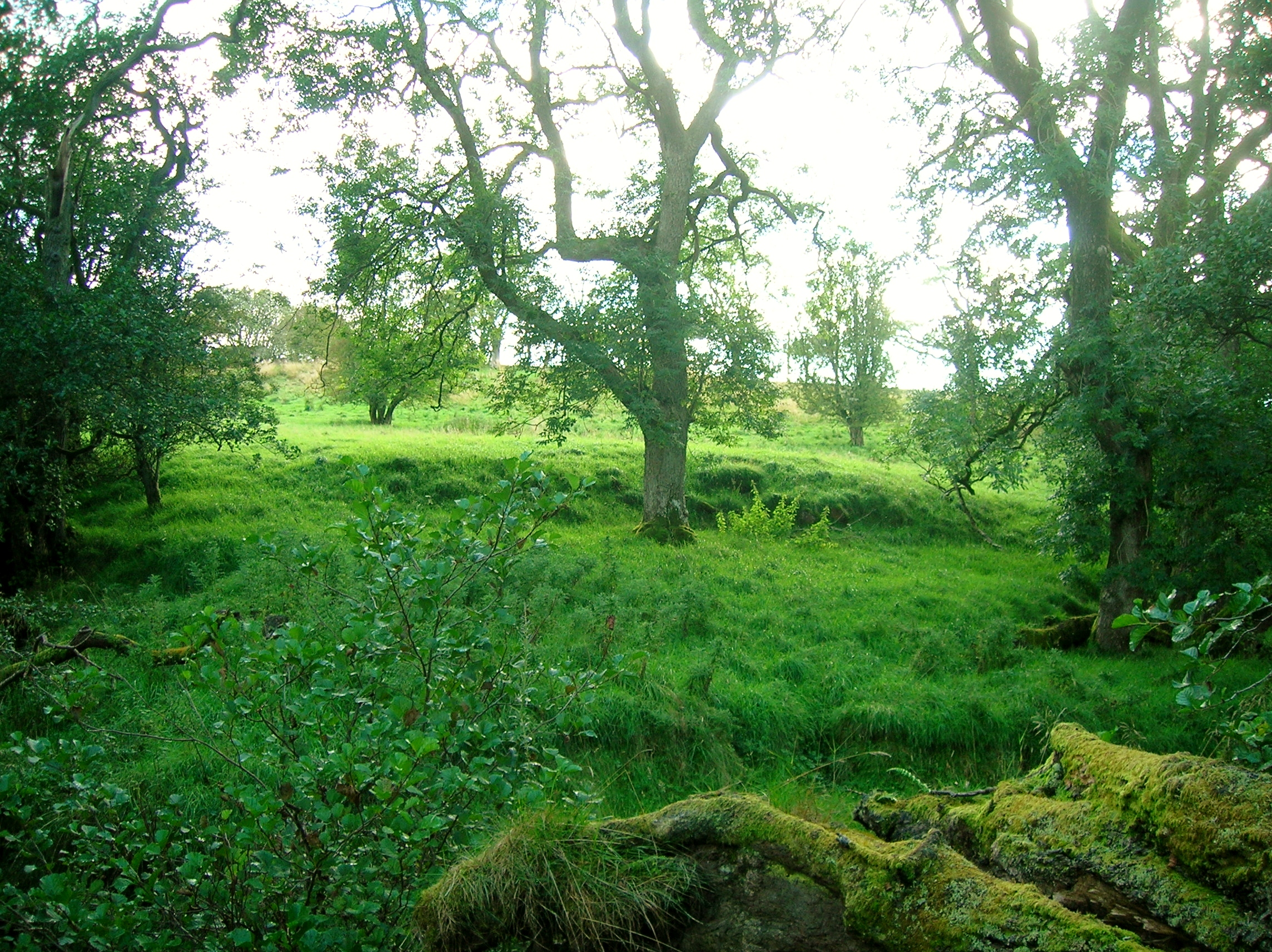
Platform and possible site of Kerse Castle close to the Bow Burn

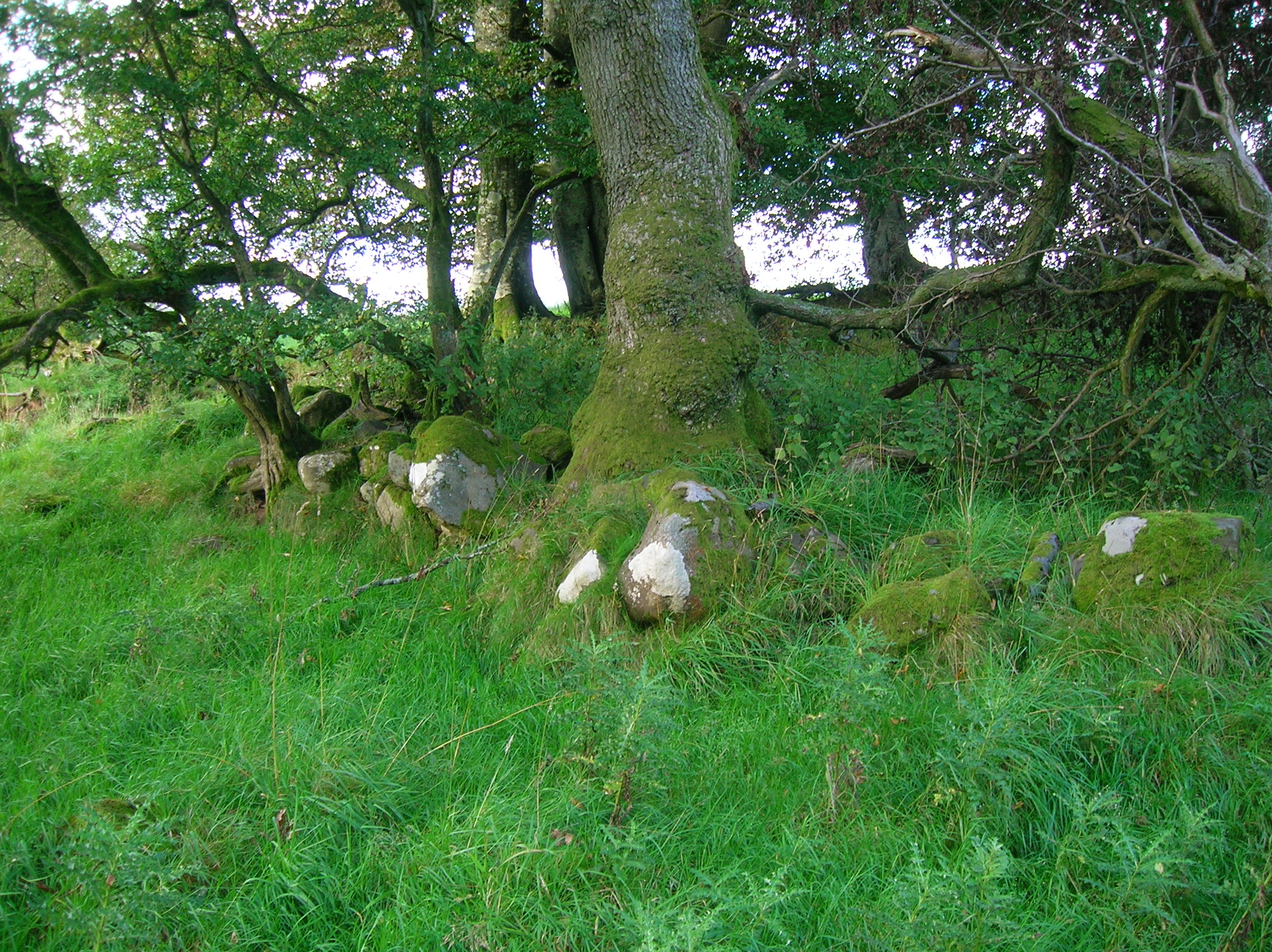
A section of the march dyke around the castle policies

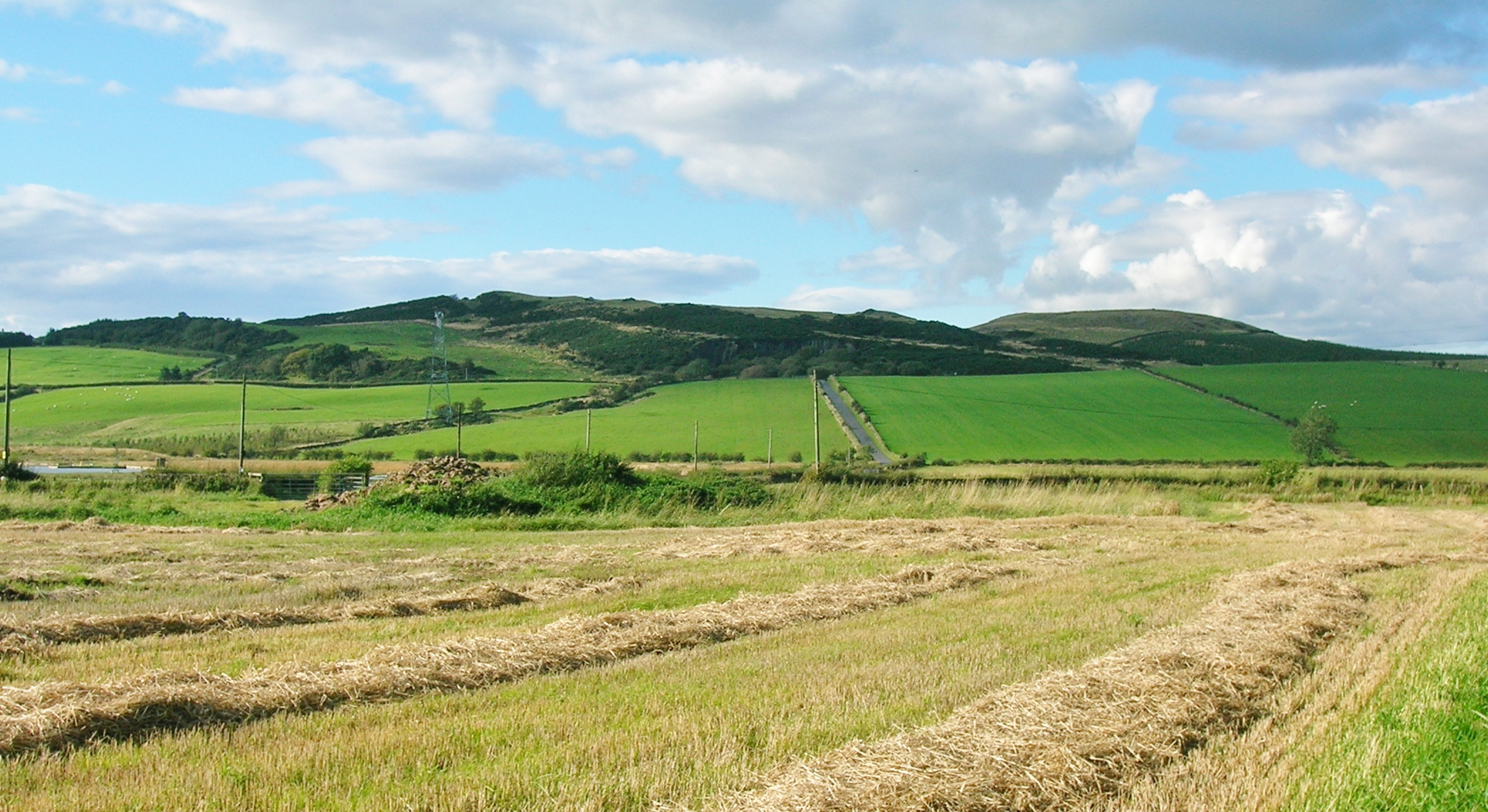
The Craigs of Kyle and the site of Kerse Cottage

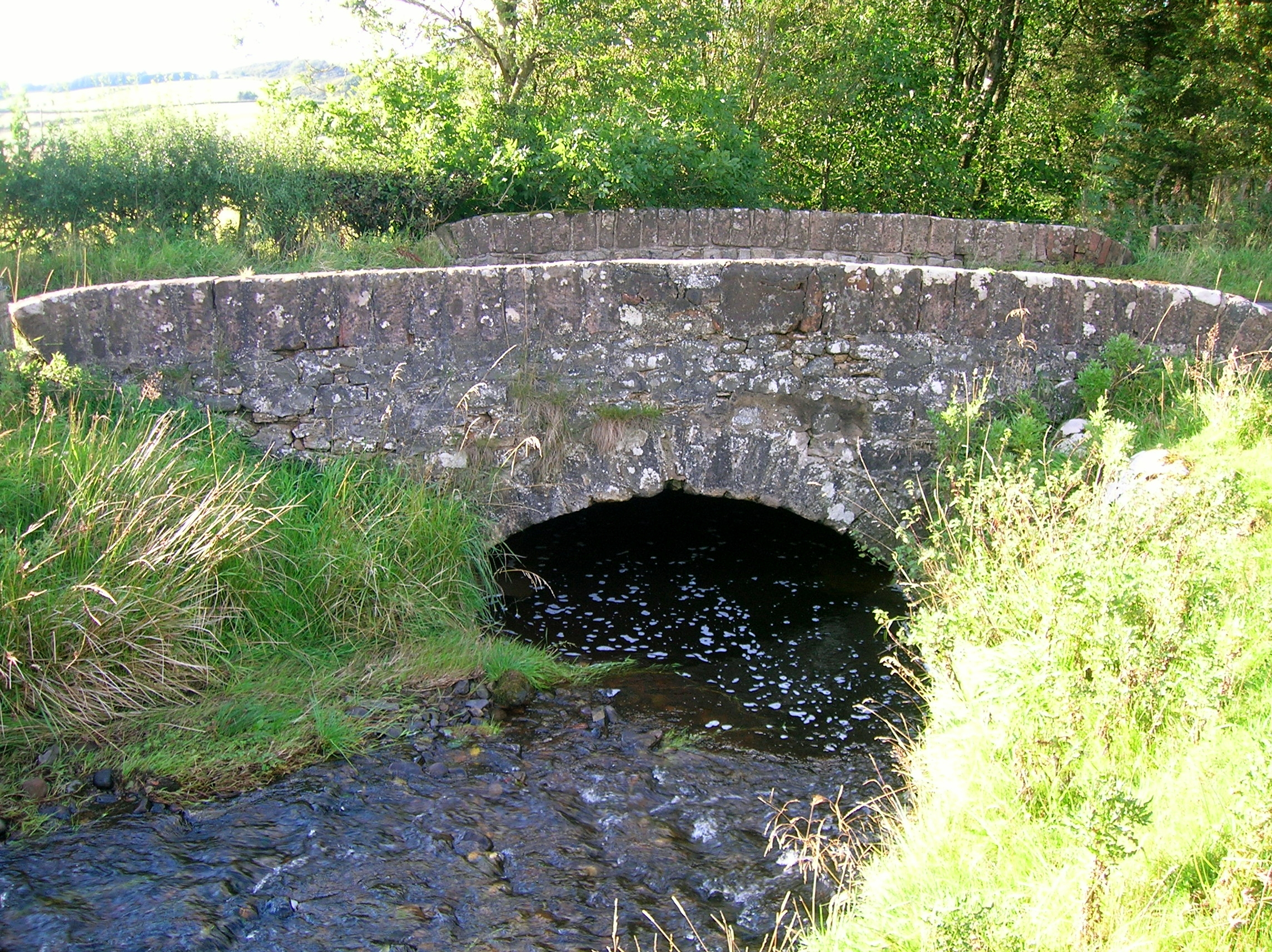
The Kerse Burn over the Bow burn near the old Kerse Castle

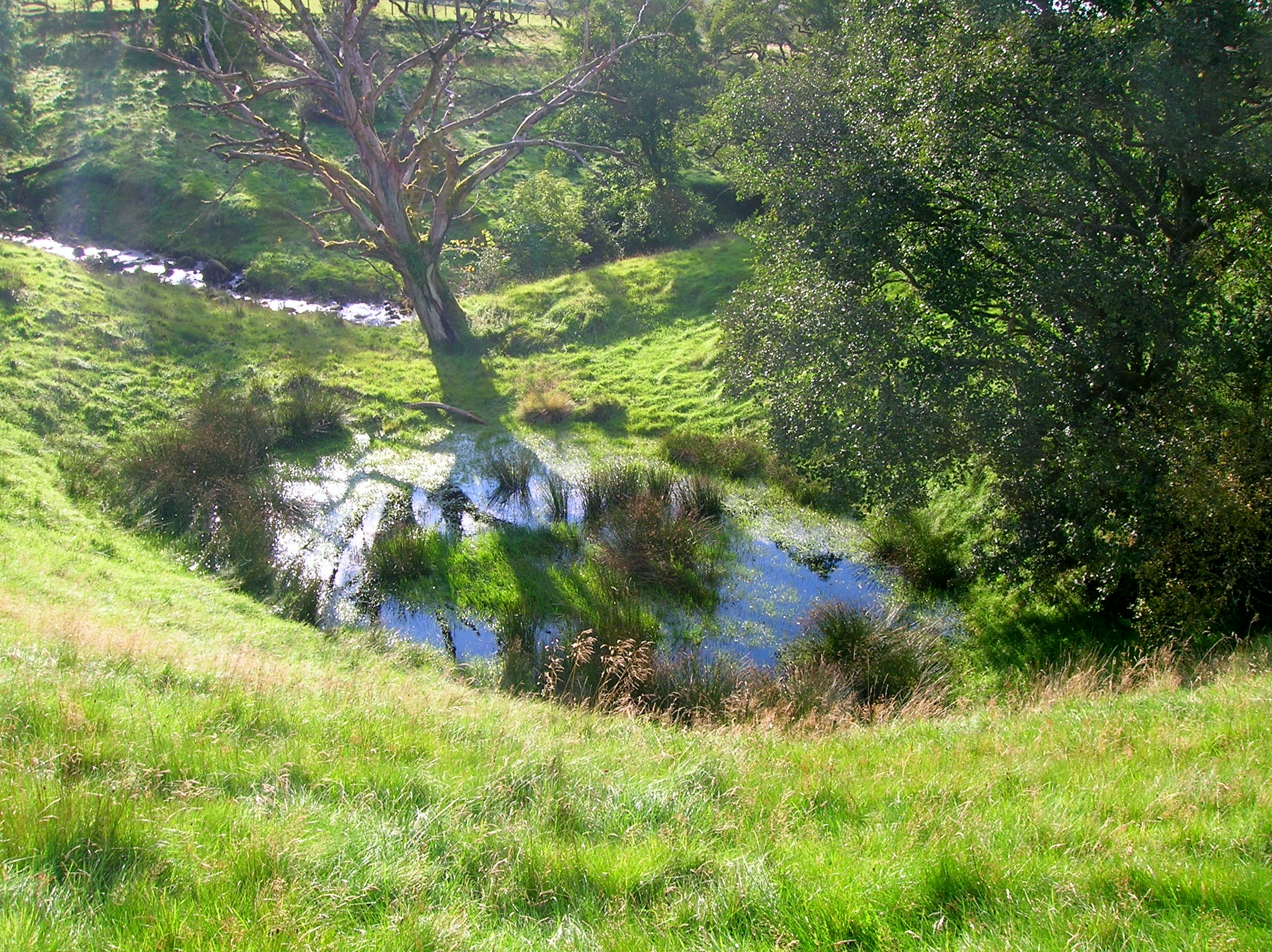
Lochan close, a possible site of the castle

=== The Raid of Barbieston ===
"The night was still serene, and sound traveled far; and from the direction in which the Castle of Kerse stood there fell on their ears an indistinct, undefined noise. Guiltree looked at Cloncaird, and they both reined in their horses and listened. The sound was faint, for it was far off, but, as they listened, it gradually shaped itself into what they could quite well comprehend. It came down more clearly, and more clearly still, until they recognized the rattle of a troop of horsemen across the rough stony road which led from Dalrymple to the hills above Cumnock. There was no need for caution now, and no time to be lost. It could be no other than the Craufurds, hard on their track.

"Drive on the cattle, and reach the ford" shouted Mure of Cloncaird. The Kennedys obeyed. The horsemen spread themselves out fan-like in rear of the booty, whips were applied to the hanks of the steers, the frightened sheep were driven at a run, and the captive horses required no urging on to hurry from the tumult which rose behind. All the while the sound of the coming Craufurds became more and more distinct. They were making for the ford, and if the Kennedys were to drive off the prey they must reach it before their pursuers. The most strenuous efforts were made, therefore, to accomplish their object; but, unless their expedition was to be bootless, there was a point beyond which they could not force their pace. They could have left the cattle, but as well might they have remained at home. To give them up without a struggle was not one of the contingencies. What they must do was to send a party forward with the booty, and to retain in the rear the service of all who were not thus employed. This they did.

About a dozen yeomen were accordingly instructed to drive the, flocks on towards the Doon, and to make the passage with all available speed; the remainder took up their position on the path as it ran through between two belts of trees, and there awaited the inevitable conflict.

The Craufurds came full sixty strong, and thus had rather the advantage in numbers. There was nothing to delay or to stay their progress save the living barrier of Kennedys under the peaceful shadow of the woodland, and this barrier they must force at all hazards, unless they were to return to Kerse to tell the grey-haired chief whom they had left behind them that they had failed in their object, As the Kennedys saw them enter between the stretching plantations, they raised a shout of defiance. The Craufurds gave it back, and rode on ready for the shock. Each man held sword or battle-axe in hand, and all were eager for the fray. The quiet night air, which so shortly before was vocal only with the congenial voices of Nature, was filled with contending cries. These were but the prelude to the rushing of the yeomen, the rattling of steel upon steel, the, prancing of the horses, and the groans of the wounded. Right stoutly did the Kennedys oppose the men of Kyle. They met them man to man and hand to hand stubbornly, tenaciously contesting every inch of ground. Saddles were emptied of their riders, wounded horses fled across the country, wounded men crept under the shelter of the plantations. But thee Craufurds pressed on and would not be denied. All down the path resounded the echoes of the fray, until the clashing of the armour and the cries of the struggling horsemen awoke, the sleepers in Dalrymple hamlet, and bade them wonder and cower because of the strange, wild medley of the sounds.

The fight was now a running one. Yonder, not two-hundred yards ahead, were the advance guard of the Kennedys, driving on with whip and yell the affrighted flocks. The ford was within sight. The nearer the Craufurds drew, the more desperate were the Kennedys to stay their progress. Who would reach the ford first? Already some of the oxen had stampeded, and solved the question so far as they were concerned, but the larger portion of the drove was still under control, and might yet be secured. The haughs of Cassillis were but over there, could they be won ere the men of Kerse should intervene and get between the cattle and the river.

The banks of the Doon were reached, and there the affray was decided. Craufurds and Kennedys were mingled in struggling confusion, fighting on the haughs by the stream, and in the river's bed the oxen, bewildered, terrified, ran hither and thither in their fright, plunging into the cooling waters, or scattering in all directions across the country. Part of the booty was secured, part was not, and the echoes of the struggle died away in the silence of the night. By common consent the combatants drew off, arid attended to their wounded. There were some who needed no attention. The battle-axe or the sharp sword-thrust had for ever put them beyond the need for further care. But many there were with cruel wounds, and these were sought out all along the long line of the contest; the flowing blood was staunched, and they were put upon the backs of the horses and taken, the Kennedys across the Doon to where Cassillis opened its portals to receive them; the Craufurds back by the way over which they had come, to the friendly walls of Kerse.

When the dead had been interred and the wounded healed, Kerse lodged information with the criminal authorities against those concerned in the raid of Barbieston. Kennedy of Guiltree, Kennedy of Blairquhan, Mure of Cloncaird, and fifty-seven others, were accordingly brought to book for their misdemeanour. They were sent from the Court of Justiciary in Edinburgh for trial to Ayr, where the leaders became surety for one another, and bound themselves to settle all lawful claims made by the Craufurds for the loss of the cattle lifted. As for the men slain, these were not scheduled in the indictment; and as for the, wounds inflicted, these were a necessity of the situation, a natural outcome of the struggle which went on between the lords of Kyle and of Carrick. The number of cattle, of sheep, and of horses was duly paraded before the Judge, and the Kennedys had to pay accordingly."

=== The Raid of Loudoun ===
Lady Loudoun called upon Bartholomew Craufurd of Kerse, and David and Duncan, his brothers, John Craufurd of Drongan, and others to collect a strong party of their followers and to ambush the chief of the Kennedys, the Earl of Cassillis, as he was returning from Stirling. The Earl was duly murdered in the sand dunes near Prestwick. In retribution the Kennedys burned down the old Loudoun Castle.

=== The legend of the Flitting of the Sow ===
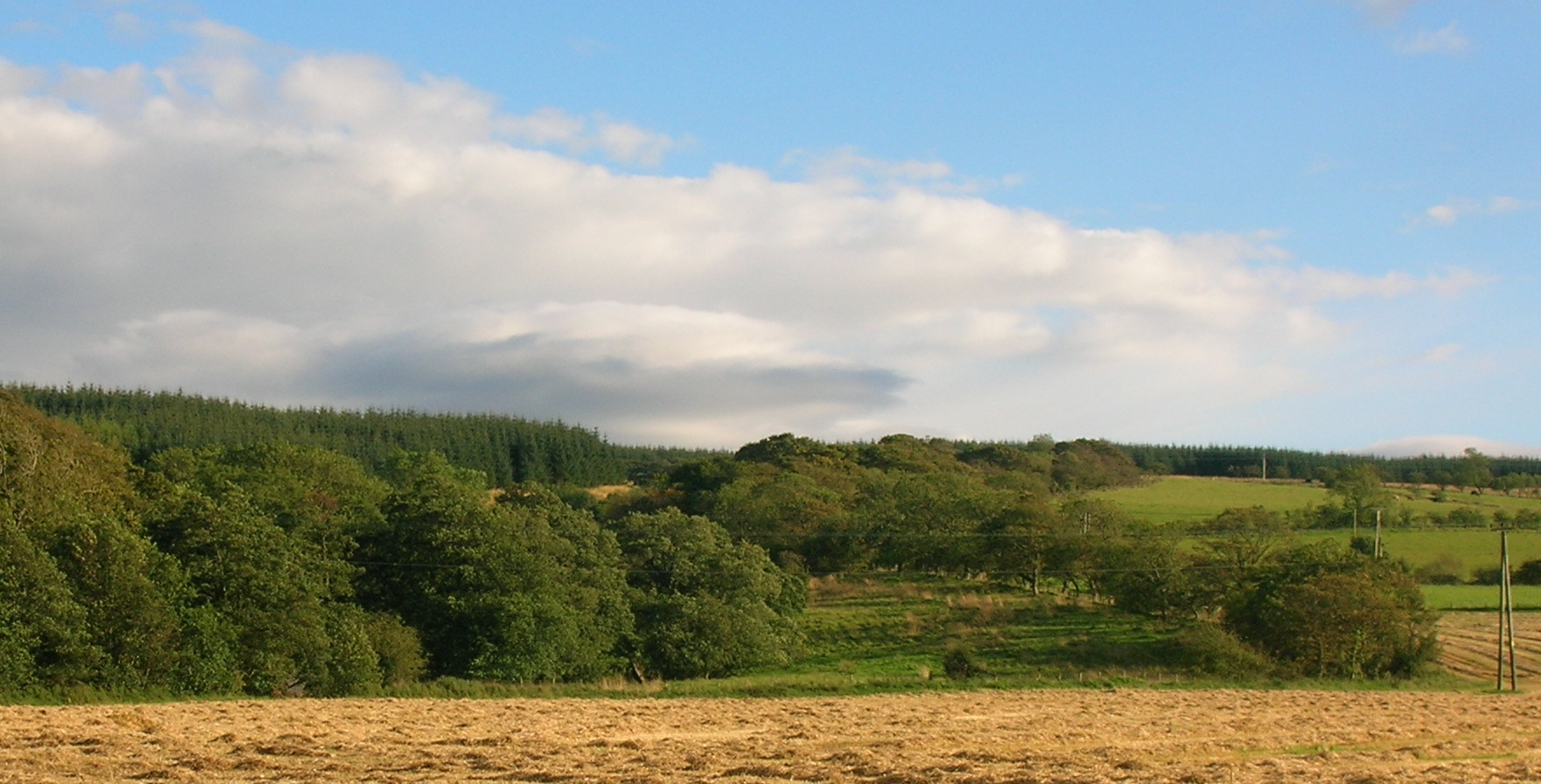
The old woodland policies of Kerse Castle

A legend linked to the castle and loch is that of 'The flitting of the Sow' which relates to the ongoing feuds between the Kennedys of Carrick and the Craufurds of Kyle. Three days before Lammastide, namely 29 July, Gilbert Kennedy came to Kerse Castle and informed the old Laird of Kerse that his clan would be tethering a sow on their land on Lammas Day. This insult and challenge resulted in the clans gathering all their supporters and on Lammas Day, 1 August, the lairds eldest son, Elspin, lead the clan into battle against the Kennedys on the Craufurds lands at the holms of Skeldon near Boreland Farm. In the ensuing fighting, John the lairds other son, was killed however the Craufurds eventually drove the Kennedys back into Carrick, a number drowning in the River Doon as they tried to escape. A pool on the Doon in this area is still called 'Kennedy's Dub'.

The old laird was an octogenarian and too infirm to take part and had remained impatiently on the castle tower looking out over the Kerse Loch for any sign of a messenger from his son Elspin. At last a rider, said to have been named 'Will o' Ashyntree' came into sight and the breathless report was that his son John had been killed, however the Craufurds were triumphant and the sow had not been flitted (removed).

Alexander Boswell of Auchinleck, a descendant of the combatants, wrote a poem upon the subject, entitled Skeldon Haughs; or, the Sow is flitted. He gives the name of the messenger to the old laird as Will o' Ashyntree which was a dwelling located due south of the castle.

=== The Laird of Kelwood ===
John Corrie, Laird of Kelwood, a dependent of the Earl of Cassillis, purchased an ancient gold item that had been found in a barn on the earl's lands by an old lady. The earl thought this to be of great value and demanded that it be handed over to him. The laird refused and fled to his home, Thomaston Castle, where the earl and the Laird of Bargany laid siege. Kelwood was forced to surrender after the castle walls were breached and upon handing over the gold artifact he was released. Kelwood complained to the Privy Council, as a result of which Cassillis and Bargany were taken to task, however without much consequence. Kelwood was naturally afraid to return to Carrick. In the meantime Kelwood had become friendly with the Laird of Carse (sic) who as an almost hereditary enemy of the Kennedys, provided a strong guard of Craufurd soldiers to see him safely to Thomaston Castle.

== Kerse Mill ==
Two and a half miles down the River Doon from Kerse Mill was Nether Skeldon Mill. There were two estates of Skeldon, Nether and over Skeldon. The latter was renamed Hollybush and the other was simply called Skeldon. This mill was held by a branch of the Craufurds of Kerse and was on the Barony of Lochmartnaham. The mill had a breast paddle wheel of about 14 horse power. David Templeton was tenant of the mill in 1851. The mill was situated in a bend of the River Doon between Hollybush and Skeldon, and was operated as an oatmeal mill until 1868 when the water power and mill were taken over by William T. Hammond, a nephew of James Templeton, carpet manufacturer, Ayr, who erected a woollen mill on the site for the manufacture of blankets. The water power was increased by deepening the tailrace and carrying it about half a mile down the river giving it a fall of about nineteen feet at the water wheel. Several types of water wheels had been used since the mill was erected. A new turbine was installed in the 1940s with horizontal drive by Gilks of Kendal, said to develop at full gate 150 horse power. From the head of the dam to the end of the tailrace was about a mile. Thus, in a mile of the River Doon, full gate could be achieved resulting in 150 h.p.

== Micro history ==
The name 'Esplin' derives from 'Abasalom' and was often used as a nickname for someone who had a fine head of hair!

== See also ==
- Kerse Loch
