= Ochiltree =

Coordinates: 55°27′42.09″N 4°21′41.44″W

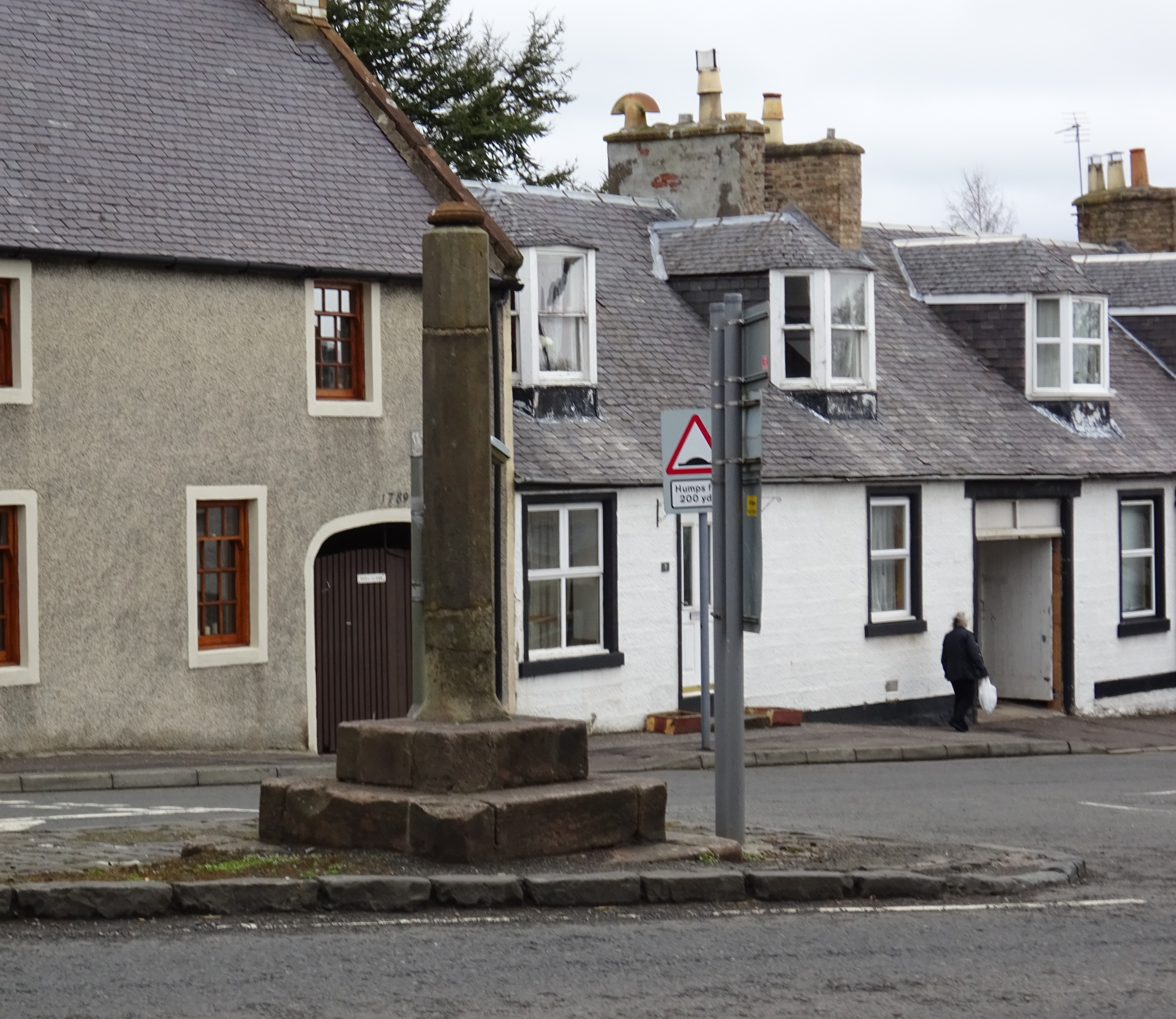
- Ochiltree, The Market Cross

- Location within East Ayrshire
- Population: 1,040 (2020)
- Council area: East Ayrshire
- Lieutenancy area: Ayrshire
- Country: Scotland
- Sovereign state: United Kingdom
- Post town: CUMNOCK
- Postcode district: KA18
- Dialling code: 01290
- Police: Scotland
- Fire: Scottish
- Ambulance: Scottish
- UK Parliament: Kilmarnock and Loudoun
- Scottish Parliament: Carrick, Cumnock and Doon Valley

Ochiltree is a conservation village in East Ayrshire, Scotland, near Auchinleck and Cumnock. It is one of the oldest villages in East Ayrshire, with archaeological remains indicating Stone Age and Bronze Age settlers. A cinerary urn was found in 1955 during excavation for a new housing estate.

== Etymology ==
The name Ochiltree was spelt Uchletree in the Middle Ages, and has a Brythonic etymology: Uchil tref - the high steading, either a reference to its landscape position (commanding views to south and east), or as a significant local centre.

== Notable residents ==
Covenanter stalwart John Fergushill (1592–1644) was Church of Scotland minister for Ochiltree between 1614 and 1639.

Main Street is lined with stone cottages and one of these was The House with the Green Shutters in the 1901 novel of that name by George Douglas Brown, who was born in Ochiltree. An annual event, The Green Shutters Festival of Working Class Writing, is held here in Brown's memory.

The Tennant family, described by Robert Burns, originate from the village. Amongst their number are Charles Tennant, Alexander Tennant and The 1st Baron Glenconner. Also from the village was a close associate of King James I of Scotland, Michael Ochiltree.

Johnny Cymbal, the famous American-based singer, songwriter and record producer, was born in Ochiltree on 3 February 1945. He is best remembered for his 1963 signature hit "Mr. Bass Man".

== Features ==
The population of Ochiltree in 2019 was 1050. The village is home to Ochiltree Primary School and is served by one small shop at the bottom of Main Street. Two sporting venues exist: the Community Centre (next to the school); and the Ochiltree Bowling Club by the river. There is also a council house estate.

The new Ochiltree Community Hub building opened in July 2019 to encourage the community to improve health and wellbeing, social inclusion and community spirit. Since inception in 2013, the hub supports the local community and surrounding areas with a number of initiatives in line with our charitable aims. The hub offers a wide range of activities to suit all age groups, including fitness, recreation, education, a library and cafe serving snacks and meals.

The ruins of ancient Auchencloigh Castle are located near Belston Loch. To the east of the village is the Barony A Frame, the preserved headgear of the Barony Colliery, which closed in 1989. A small loch, used latterly as a curling pond, known as Loch of the Hill lay close to South Palmerston Farm until it was drained in the late 19th century.

Ochiltree Castle (meaning: "the lofty dwelling-place") was a castle built next to the Lugar Water by the Colville family in the 12th century, and was destroyed in 1449, by William Douglas of Glenbervie.

Peden's Cave is located on the banks of the River Lugar near Auchinbay Farm. Alexander Peden was a Covenanter minister of the 1680s who had to hide from the King's soldiers who were attempting to prevent covenanters from practising their version of the Christian faith.

Kemp's Castle is a large and impressive boulder on the top of the River Lugar Gorge near Slatehole Farm that is named from the Scots for a champion or person of great strength.

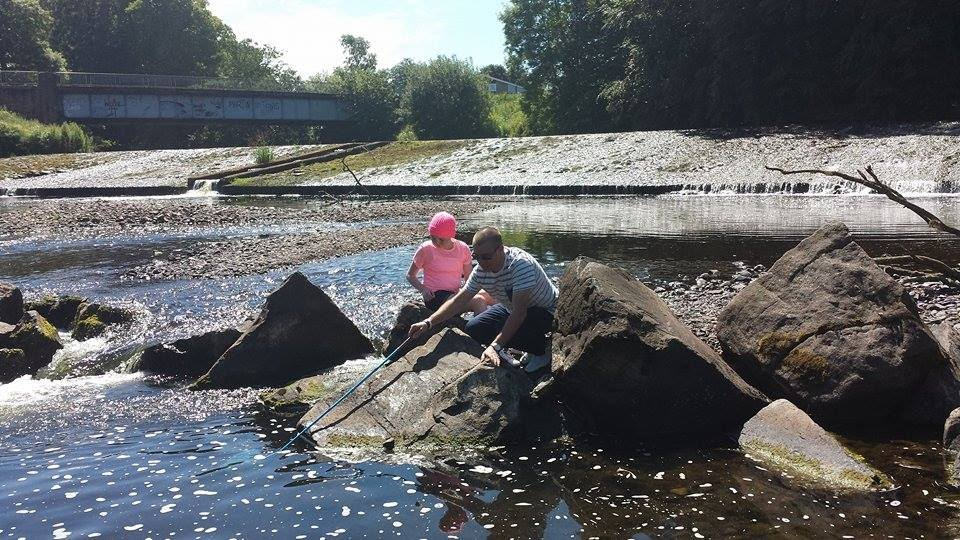

Lessnessock Farm was a breeder which produced prize-winners in the 1920s.

== See also ==
- Lord Ochiltree
- Ochiltree County, Texas
- Ocheltree, Kansas
