= Kerse Loch =

Coordinates: 55°23′53.3″N 4°29′22.1″W

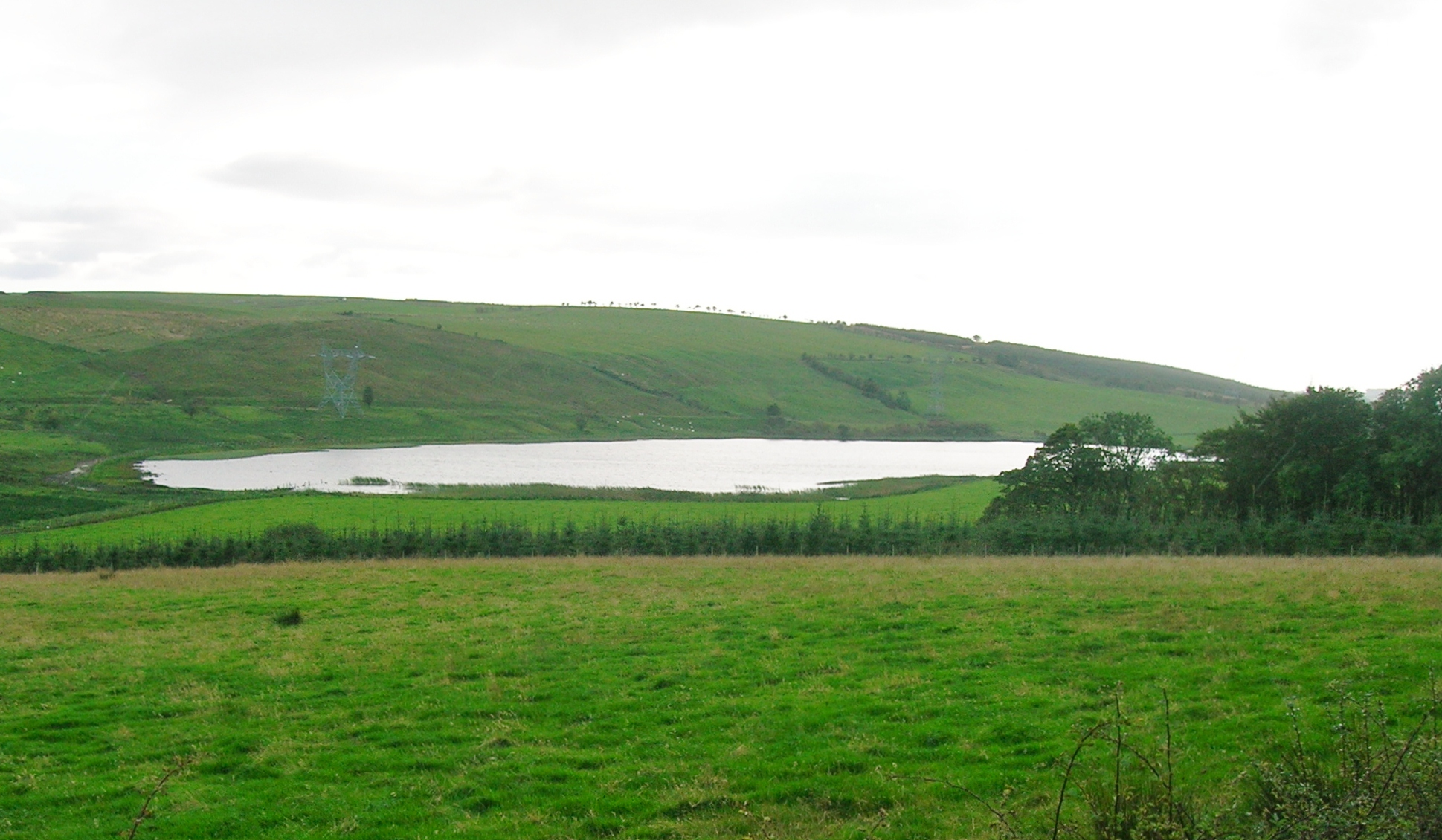
- Kerse Loch from the north-west

- The location of Karse Loch, East Ayrshire
- Location: Dalrymple, East Ayrshire, Scotland
- Lake type: Freshwater loch
- Primary inflows: Rainfall and runoff
- Primary outflows: Kerse Burn.
- Basin countries: Scotland
- Settlements: Dalrymple

Kerse Loch (NS 34894 16186), also recorded as Carse Loch (1841) is a small freshwater loch in the East Ayrshire Council Area, lying in a glacial Kettle Hole, Parish of Dalrymple, Scotland.

== The loch ==
=== Etymology ===
Carse, Cars, and Kerse in Scots refers to Low and fertile land; generally, that which is adjacent to a river or water body. The name appears to have originally referred to 'flat lands’ of a wet fenny and character, later associated with rich fertility.

=== Cartographic evidence ===
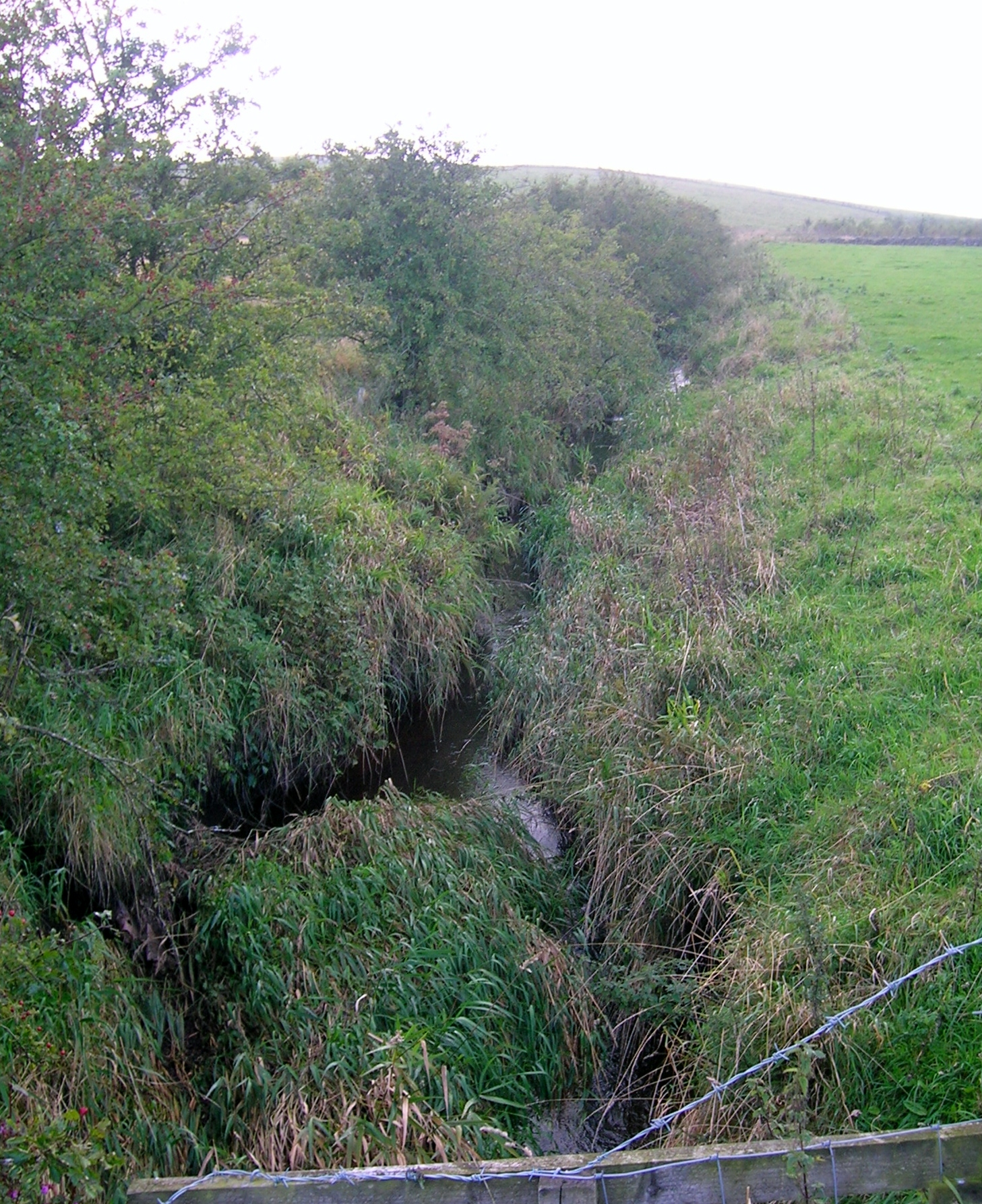
The Kerse Burn near the old Kerse Tileworks draining the loch.

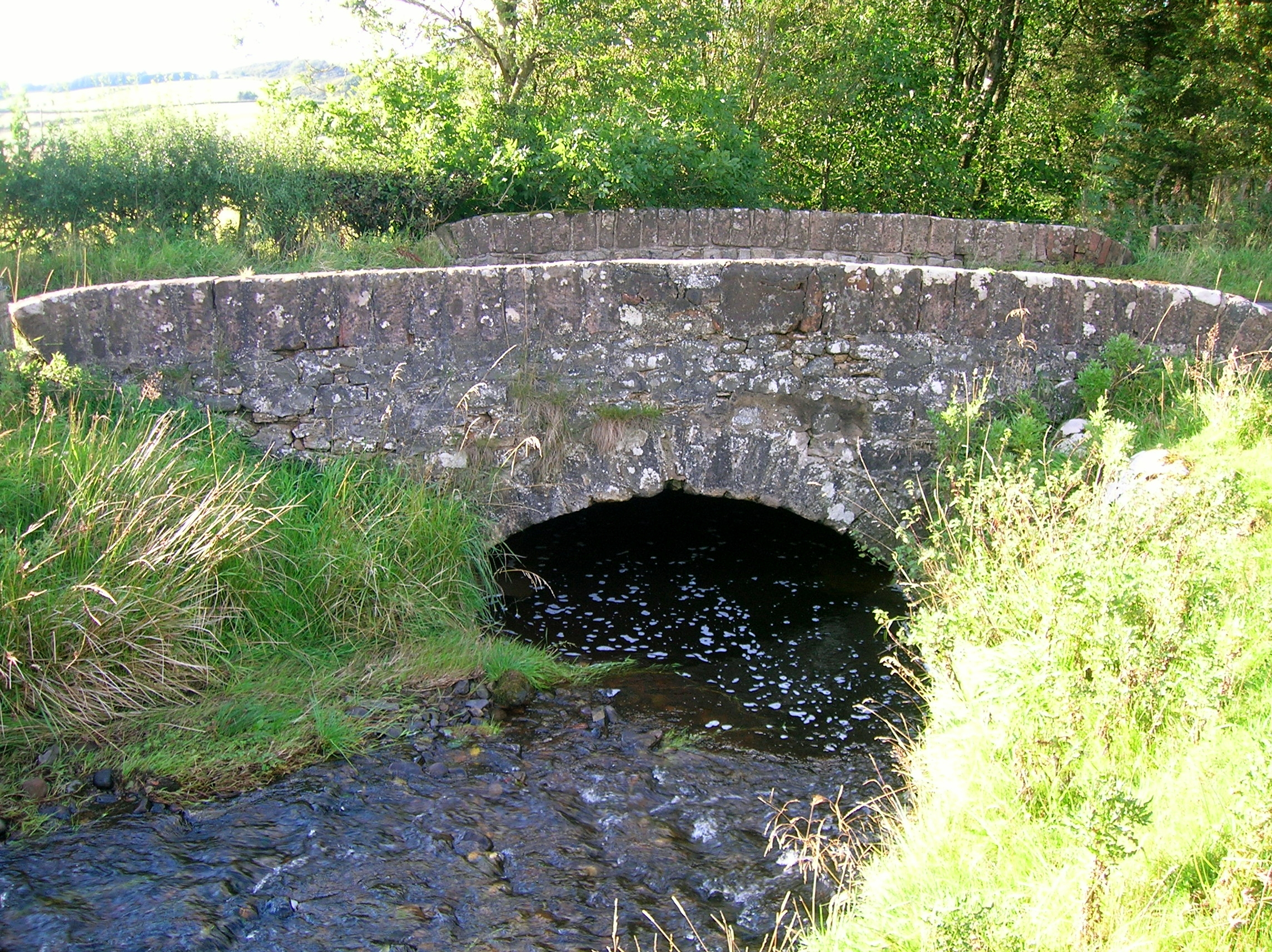
The Kerse Burn over the Bow burn near the old Kerse Castle.

Robert Gordon's map of circa marks the loch and the castle of Cars (sic) nearby. 1636-52Blaeu map of circa 1654 taken from Timothy Pont's map of circa 1600 shows the Kars Loch (sic) and nearby Cars Castle (sic) with substantial grounds and woodland. Molls map of 1745 shows the loch and also shows the castle lying to the east. Roy's map of 1747 records the loch as Carse and the castle is located to the east. A burn running from the west is shown as feeding the loch. In 1821 the loch is clearly shown and 'Kerse' is shown towards the Sundrum Water. In 1832 Thomson's map shows the 'Carse Loch' with a small inflow burn and 'Carse' dwelling on a road to the east.

Uses

Curling matches are recorded as having taken place at the loch in 1874 and on 24 December 1846.

The loch is mainly fed by rainfall and runoff and the Loch Kerse Burn runs down to join the Water of Coyle, however no mills appear to have been sited along the burns length. The Kerse Burn has been canalised and deepened along its length. By 1978 the railway close to the southern loch shore had been lifted and a boathouse had been established on the northern bank.

== Situation ==
The loch lies below Broom Hill and the heights of the Craigs of Kyle, and on its banks is supposedly the site of Kerse Castle, one time stronghold of the Crawfurd clan before the family moved to nearby Skeldon House. The old maps consistently show the castle as lying well to the east of the loch beside the Bow Burn.

== Kerse Castle ==
Kerse Castle (NS 306 508) was the stronghold of David Craufurd, the laird of Kerse and only a few stones may mark the old castle's position, supposedly not far from the Kerse Park Farm, however this is not proven. The first record of the castle is from 1281 and its demise is said to have been in 1797 when it was blown down in a storm. Reginald, first of the Kerse Craufurds, got a grant of the lands of Kerse from his brother Hugh, in the reign of King Alexander III (1249-1286).

=== The Flitting of the Sow ===
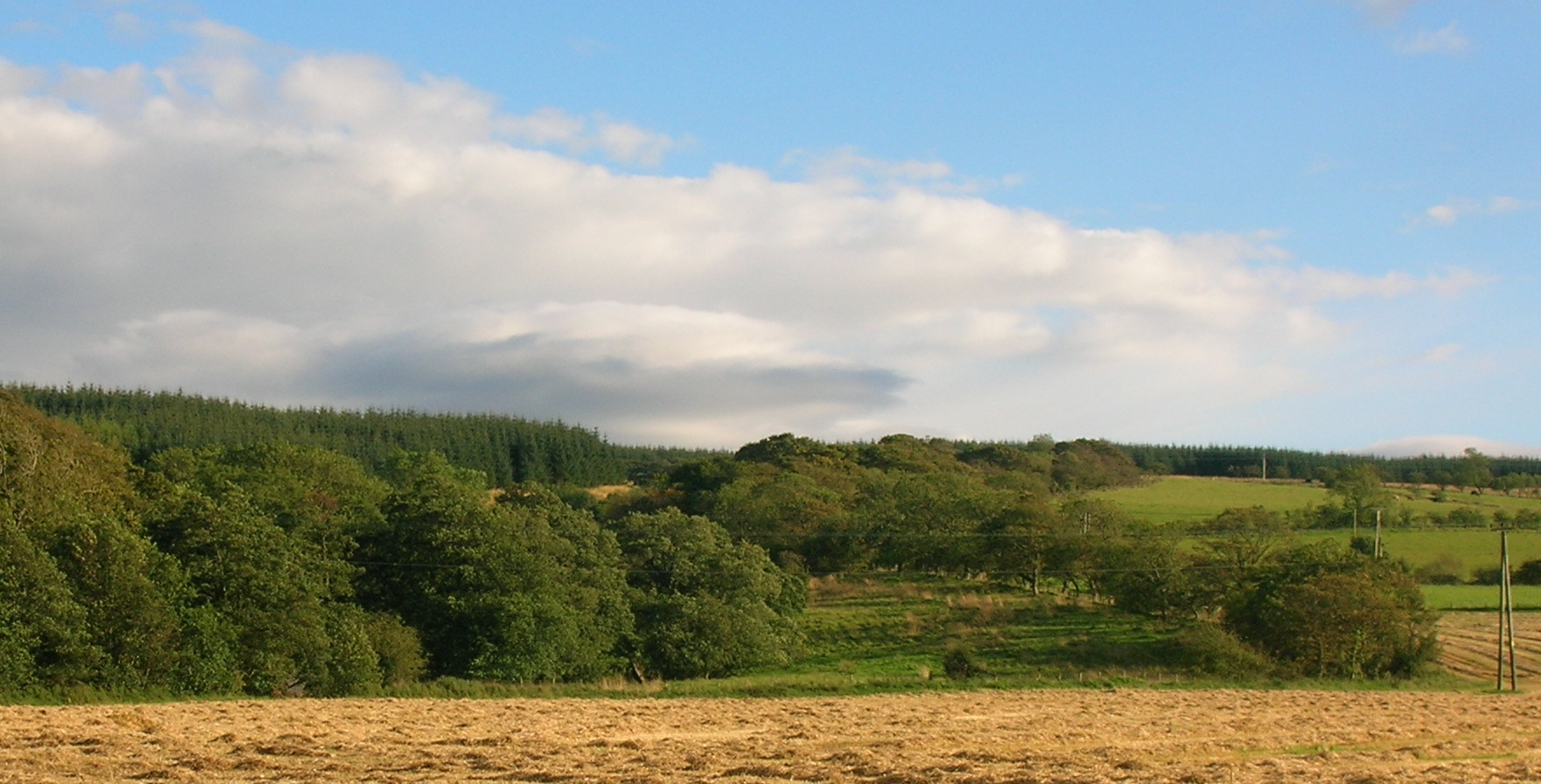
The old woodland policies of Kerse Castle.

A legend linked to the castle and loch is 'The flitting of the Sow' which relates to ongoing feuds between the Kennedys of Carrick and the Craufurds of Kyle. Three days before Lammastide, namely 29 July, Gilbert Kennedy came to Kerse Castle and informed the old Laird of Kerse that his clan would be tethering a sow on their land on Lammas Day. This insult and challenge resulted in the clans gathering all their supporters and on Lammas Day, 1 August, the lairds eldest son, Elspin, lead the clan into battle against the Kennedys on the Craufurds lands at the holms of Skeldon. In the ensuing fighting, John the lairds other son, was killed however the Craufurds eventually drove the Kennedys back into Carrick, a number drowning in the River Doon as they tried to escape.

The old laird had been too infirm to take part and had remained impatiently at the castle looking out over the Kerse Loch for any sign of a messenger from Elspin. At last a rider came into sight and the report was that his son John had been killed, however the Craufurds were triumphant and the sow had been flitted (removed).

Alexander Boswell of Auchinleck, a descendant of the combatants, wrote a poem upon the subject, entitled Skeldon Haughs; or, the Sow is flitted.

== Natural history ==
The loch in 1846 was well stocked with pike, perch, and eels, and was frequented by wild-duck, teal, widgeon, and other aquatic fowl. The loch is part of the Wetland Bird Survey (WEBS).

== Geology ==
The Southern Upland Fault is accompanied by a group of associated faults subparallel to the main fault, including Kerse Loch Fault, Littlemill Fault, Leadhills Fault and Glenmuir Fault. The former two mark the southern edge of the deepest part of Mauchline Basin. A series of lesser faults subparallel also transect the region and the intersection of the two fault trends has created a large number of discrete fault-bounded blocks.

== Micro history ==
During the 1926 coal miners strike the farmer from Kerspark Farm would cross the loch on the ice to buy coal from the miners who were extracting from the old bings at Cairntable. On one occasion the cart broke through the ice and was abandoned where it sank.

People from Cairntable miner's rows often swam in the loch, especially the children. The girls swimming site was called the 'Coo-Creep'.

Cairntable Halt was located nearby at the miner's village of that name and close to Knockshinnoch Farm.

A Kerse House near Grangemouth is on the site of a castle and latterly was held by the Dundas family, later Marquises of Zetland.

== See also ==
- Loch Fergus
- Lindston Loch, South Ayrshire
- Martnaham Loch
- Snipe Loch
- Carcluie Loch
- Kerse Castle, East Ayrshire
