= Drongan =

Coordinates: 55.4355°N 4.4599°W

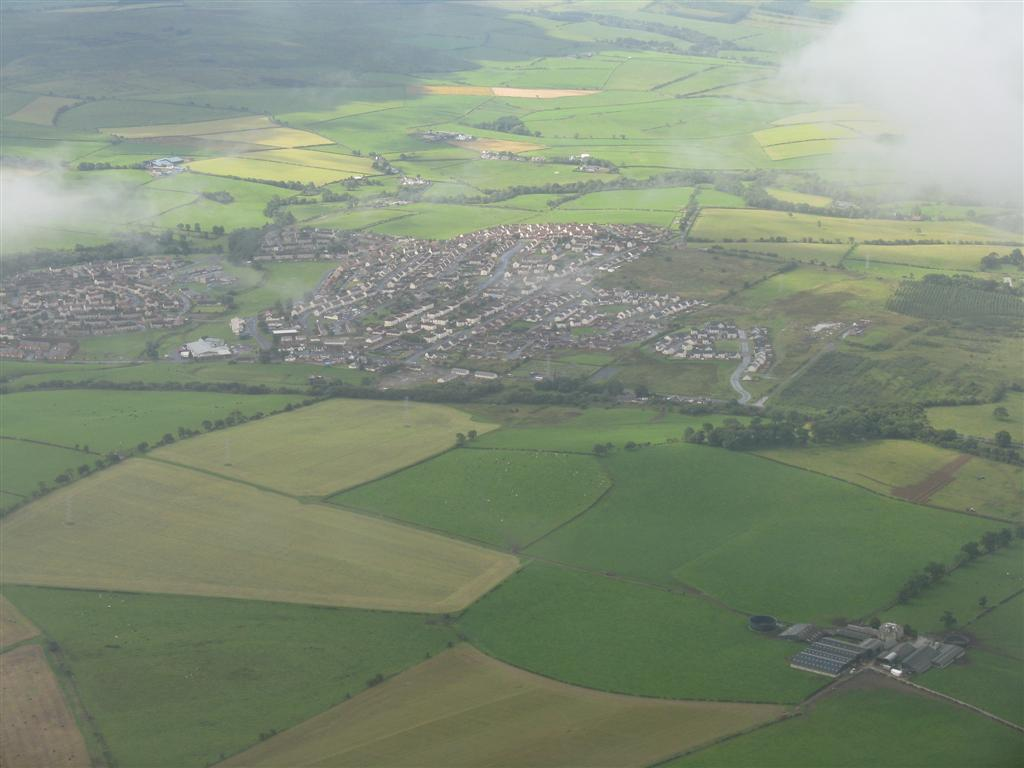
- Drongan seen on approach to Prestwick Airport

- Location within East Ayrshire
- Population: 3,060 (2020)
- OS grid reference: NS445184
- Council area: East Ayrshire
- Lieutenancy area: Ayrshire and Arran
- Country: Scotland
- Sovereign state: United Kingdom
- Post town: AYR
- Postcode district: KA6
- Dialling code: 01292
- Police: Scotland
- Fire: Scottish
- Ambulance: Scottish
- UK Parliament: Ayr, Carrick and Cumnock
- Scottish Parliament: Carrick, Cumnock and Doon Valley

Drongan is a former mining village in East Ayrshire, some 8 miles (13 km) east of Ayr and west of Cumnock. It had a population of 4686 in 2011.

== History ==
The earliest references to Drongan lands are to be found in documents dating to the 14th century. In the 1390s, these lands were granted to the Craufurds, whose stronghold for 250 years was Drongan Castle. The remains of the castle can be seen on Drongan Mains Farm. The estate passed from the Craufurds to the Cunninghames, then to the Earls of Stair. About 1760, the Drongan Estate was purchased by the Smith family – who built Drongan House, set up a pottery near Coalhall and introduced pioneering agricultural improvements.

The village of Drongan (originally known as Taiglum) grew up near the early coal mine and by 1900 consisted of 65 houses and a few shops. These rows at Taiglum were demolished in the 1930s and the inhabitants were housed in new housing schemes. In 1946, it was proposed that Drongan should be developed as a "new town" and families from various small mining communities were also re-housed there.

Like many other villages in this part of East Ayrshire, Drongan saw prosperity when the Killoch and Barony pit mines were operational.

The Drongan Centre, opened in 2002, provides health, Local Authority and police services within a modern purpose-built facility and received funding from the Scottish Executive Health Department's Primary and Community Premises Modernisation Fund.

A small loch known as Loch Shield was located near Drongan House and Lochmark Farm, its waters once helping to power the nearby Mill of Shield.

== See also ==
- Loch of Trabboch
