= Timothy Pont =

17th-century Scottish cartographer

Reverend Timothy Pont (c. 1565 – c. 1615) was a Scottish minister, cartographer and topographer. He was the first to produce a detailed map of Scotland. Pont's maps are among the earliest surviving to show a European country in minute detail, from an actual survey.

== Life ==
He was the second son of Robert Pont, a Church of Scotland minister in Edinburgh and Lord of Session (judge), and his first wife.

He matriculated as a student of St. Leonard's College, St. Andrews, in 1580, and obtained the degree of M.A. in 1584. He spent the late 1580s and the 1590s travelling throughout Scotland. Between 1601 and 1610 he was the minister of Dunnet Parish Church in Caithness. He took a year's leave in 1608 to map Scotland. He was continued 7 December 1610 but resigned some time before 1614, when the name of William Smith appears as minister of the parish. On 25 July 1609, Pont had a Royal grant of two thousand acres (8 km²) in connection with the scheme for the plantation of Ulster, the price being 400l.

== Works ==
Pont was an accomplished mathematician and the first projector of a Scottish atlas. In connection with the project, he made a complete survey of all the shires and islands of the kingdom, visiting remote districts and making drawings on the spot. A contemporary described how Pont "personally surveyed...and added such cursory observations on the monuments of antiquity...as were proper for the furnishing out of future descriptions." He died having almost completed his task.

The originals of his maps, which are preserved in the National Library of Scotland, Edinburgh, are characterised by neatness and accuracy. Pont's manuscript maps are key historical documents for their time, of importance in the study of place-names, settlements, and other studies. Many of the maps have miniature drawings of major buildings (such as castles and abbeys), obviously sketched from life. Though on a small scale and not entirely accurate, these give an idea of the historical appearance of many buildings that have since been altered or have disappeared completely.

James VI gave instructions that the maps should be purchased from Pont's heirs and prepared for publication, but on account of the disorders of the time they were nearly forgotten. Sir John Scot of Scotstarvet prevailed on Robert Gordon of Straloch to undertake their revision with a view to publication. The task of revision was completed by Gordon's son, James Gordon, parson of Rothiemay, and they were published in Joan Blaeu's Atlas Novus, vol. v. Amsterdam, 1654 (reissued in 1662 in vol. vi). The 'Topographical Account of the District of Cunninghame, Ayrshire, compiled about the Year 1600 by Mr. Timothy Pont,' was published in 1850; and was reproduced under the title 'Cunninghame topographized, by Timothy Pont, A.M., 1604–1608; with Continuations and Illustrative Notices by the late James Dobie of Crummock, F.S.A. Scot., edited by his son, John Shedden Dobie,' Glasgow, 1876. Robert Sibbald based much of his work on Pont's.
