= Sam Shearer =

Scottish footballer (1883–1971)

Personal information
- Full name: Samuel Bridgman Shearer
- Date of birth: 29 December 1883
- Place of birth: Coylton, Scotland
- Date of death: 5 September 1971 (aged 87)
- Place of death: Pittsburgh, PA, USA
- Position: Inside forward

Youth career
- –: Trabboch

Senior career*
Years	Team	Apps	(Gls)
1908–1910	Southampton	17	(0)
1910–1912	Nithsdale Wanderers		
1912–1913	Bradford Park Avenue	1	(0)
- * Club domestic league appearances and goals

Samuel Bridgman Shearer (29 December 1883 – 5 September 1971) was a Scottish footballer who played at inside-forward for Southampton and Bradford Park Avenue in the early 20th century.

== Football career ==
Shearer was born in Coylton in South Ayrshire and started his football career in Scottish Junior Football with Trabboch before being invited for a trial at Southampton in the summer of 1908. He showed "considerable promise" in the trial matches and was rewarded with a professional contract.

He made his debut for the "Saints" in the opening match of the 1908–09 Southern League season, a 3–1 draw at Brighton, but after four appearances, he lost his place to Frank Jordan in mid-September. Described as "naturally skillful", Shearer was able to keep the ball close to his feet and as a result incurred regular kicks and bruises to his ankles, but his individuality was never properly exploited by his team-mates. For the remainder of the season, Shearer was in-and-out of the side making a total of eleven appearances, mainly at inside-left, but also at inside-right and on the left wing.

In the summer of 1909, Saints signed Sam Brittleton who took over at inside-left, before losing out in turn to Bob Carter. Shearer was then third-choice for the inside-left berth, and it was only in the last month of the season that he made a sustained run in the side with five first-team appearances.

He returned to Scotland in the summer of 1910 to join Nithsdale Wanderers of Dumfries, before returning to England with Bradford Park Avenue in December 1912. After making only one league appearance for Bradford, Shearer retired in 1913, then immigrating to America.
