= Loch of Trabboch =

The Loch of Trabboch or Dalrympleston Loch
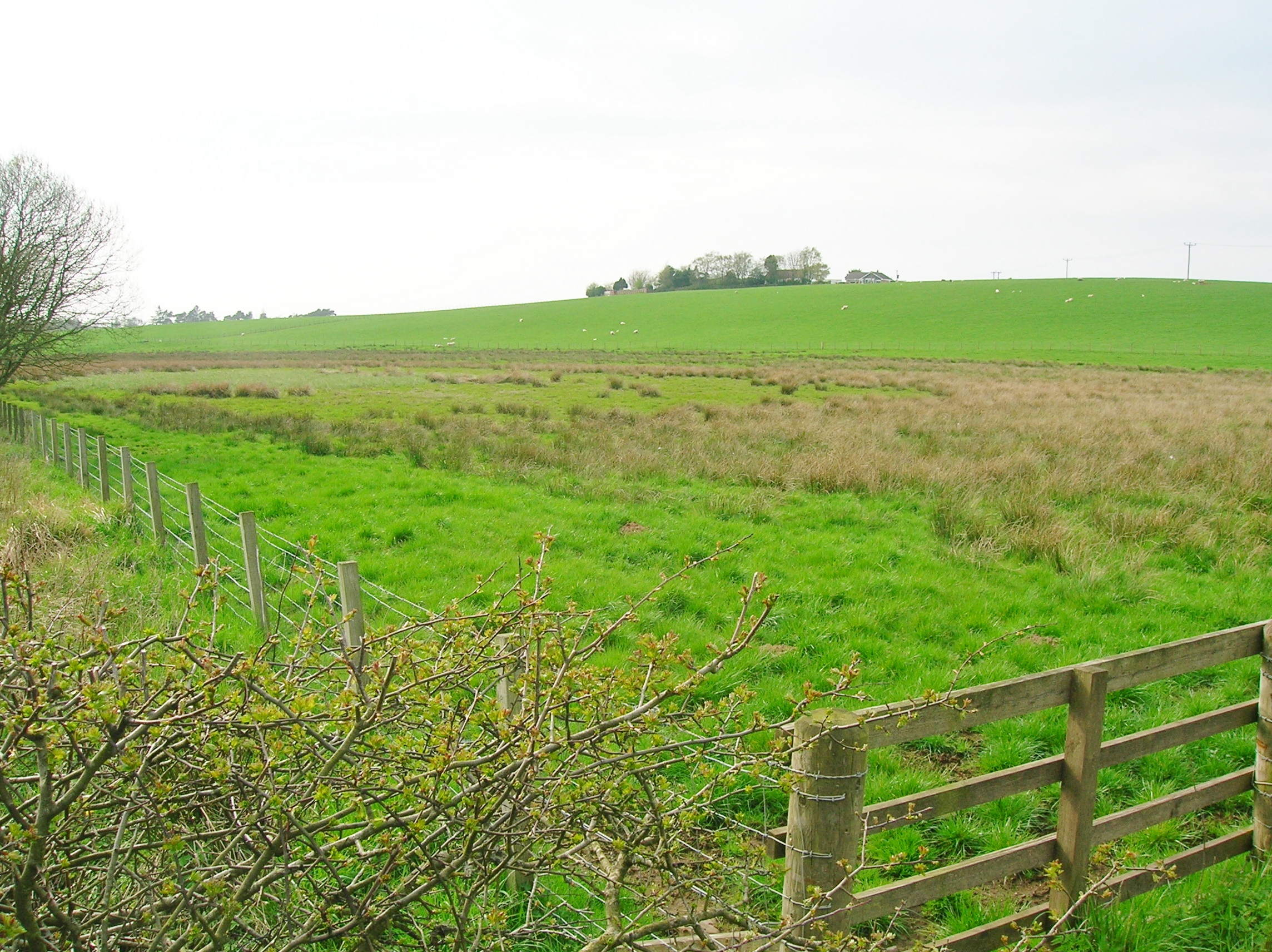
- The site of the Loch of Trabboch

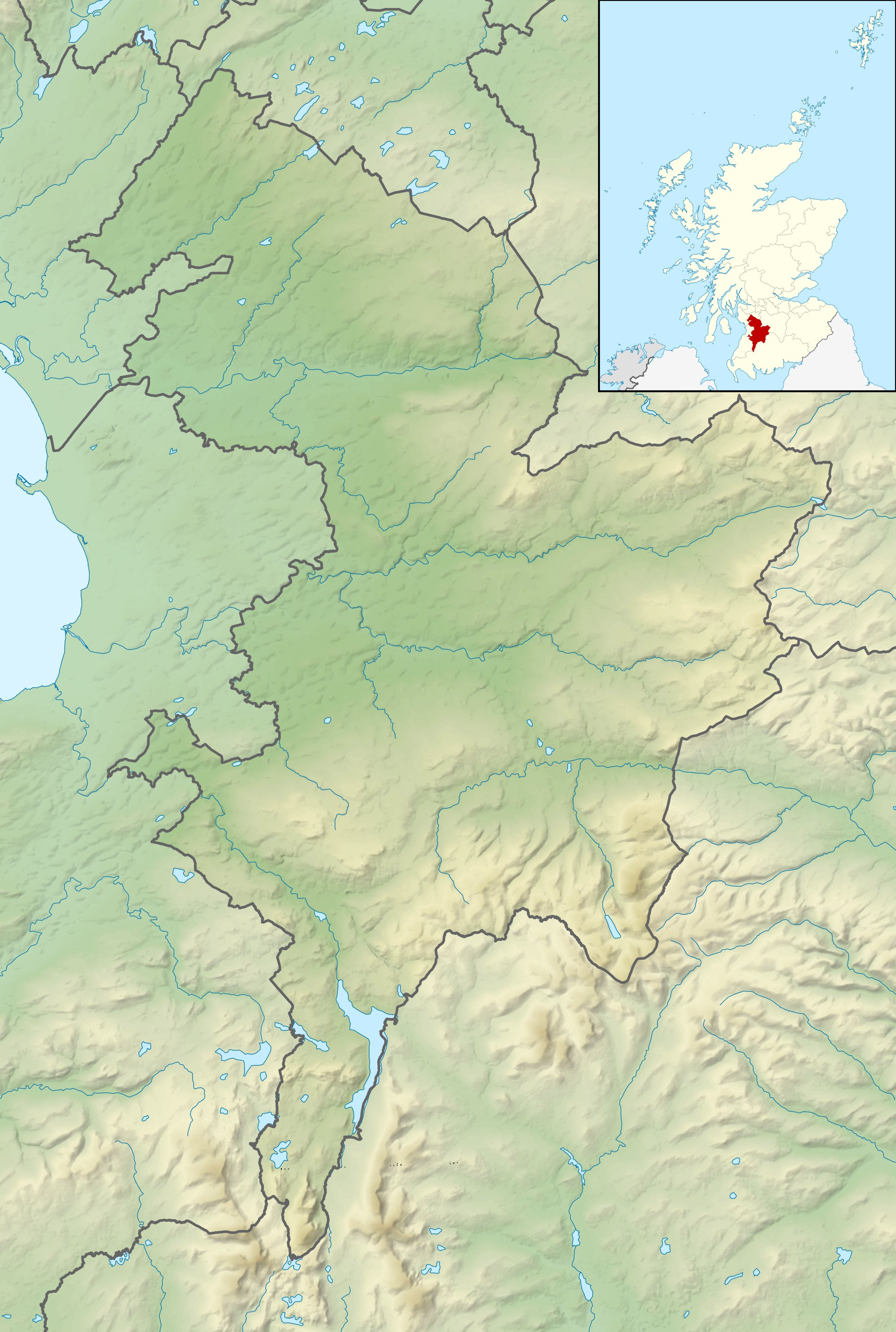
- Location within East Ayrshire
- Location: Trabboch, East Ayrshire, Scotland
- Type: Drained freshwater loch
- Primary inflows: Dalrympleston Burn
- Primary outflows: Dalrympleston Burn
- Basin countries: Scotland
- Max. length: c. 680 ft (210 m)
- Max. width: c. 350 ft (110 m)
- Average depth: Shallow
- Islands: One
- Settlements: Drongan

The Loch of Trabboch or Dalrympleston Loch (NS440211) was situated in a low-lying area below the old Castle of Trabboch, once held by the Boyd family in the Parish of Stair, East Ayrshire, Scotland.

== History ==
The loch is recorded as the "Loch of Trabboch" in 1654, pronounced "Traaboch". A small "comma-shaped" island of 1/8 acre (500 square metres) and around 120 feet (40 metres) long is shown on the first OS maps at co-ordinates 55.458984° N and 4.466443° W.

The Drumdow colliery near the village of Trabboch was abandoned and flooded by 1905 and has become known as Trabboch Loch, the name Dalrympleston Loch or marsh being applied to the old Loch of Trabboch site.

=== Usage ===
The loch was a site where swans, moor hens, and other waterfowl nested and as a site within the old Barony of Trabboch it was an area used for hunting and fishing by the laird.

OS maps mark the loch as a curling pond and records show that from 1853 to at least the 1880s it was used for matches between clubs such as those at Tarbolton and Ochiltree. Tarbolton Curling Club used Loch Fail in the 19th century, showing that it was prone to winter flooding at that time.

=== Cartographic evidence ===
Blaeu's map of 1654, dating from Timothy Pont's survey of circa 1604, clearly shows and names the loch and indicates only an outflow to the Water of Coyle. Roy's map of 1747 does not show a loch. Thomson map of 1832 does not record a loch.

The 19th century Ordnance Survey maps show the site clearly with an island present, and an inflow from the Dalrympleston Burn, exiting to run down to the Water of Coyle at Gatefoot. An extensive area of wetland is shown extending around the loch waters on early OS maps. The 1897 OS marks the loch as a Curling Pond, but the 1948 map shows a drain running through the loch and no mention of its sue as a curling pond. Many drainage schemes date to the end of World War I when many soldiers returned en masse to civilian life. After 1959 the loch had become a wetland area and no longer had open water.

Previous location of the Loch of Trabboch, East Ayrshire

== Micro-history ==
Trabboch Castle

The lands of Trabboch are first recorded by name in a rental of 1303–4. King Robert the Bruce gave the L-plan castle to the Boyds of Kilmarnock for services rendered at the Battle of Bannockburn as revealed in an undated charter in the Register of the Great Seal, stating that King Robert I granted the 'lands of Trebach' in Kyle-Regis to Robert Boyd. By 1451 the lands had passed into the hands of William, Earl of Douglas and later to the Boswells of Auchinleck. In the 17th century Chalmers of Gadgirth and Reid of Barskimming held parts of the Barony of Trabboch. Love states that the Arthurs, Lord Ochiltree, and the Campbells of Loudoun also held Trabboch Castle. The associated Mill of Trabboch stood on the Water of Coyle and was not powered by the loch waters.

Campbell sees Trabboch Castle as the only survivor of a defensive chain of castles that once ran across Kyle Regis and included Stair, Auchencloigh, Drongan, and Drumsuie.

Wildlife

A Common Crane, a rare species for Ayrshire was recorded at Dalrympleston marsh in 1987. It is recorded on the bird gazetteer as a site for watching birds.

Views of the Loch of Trabboch site

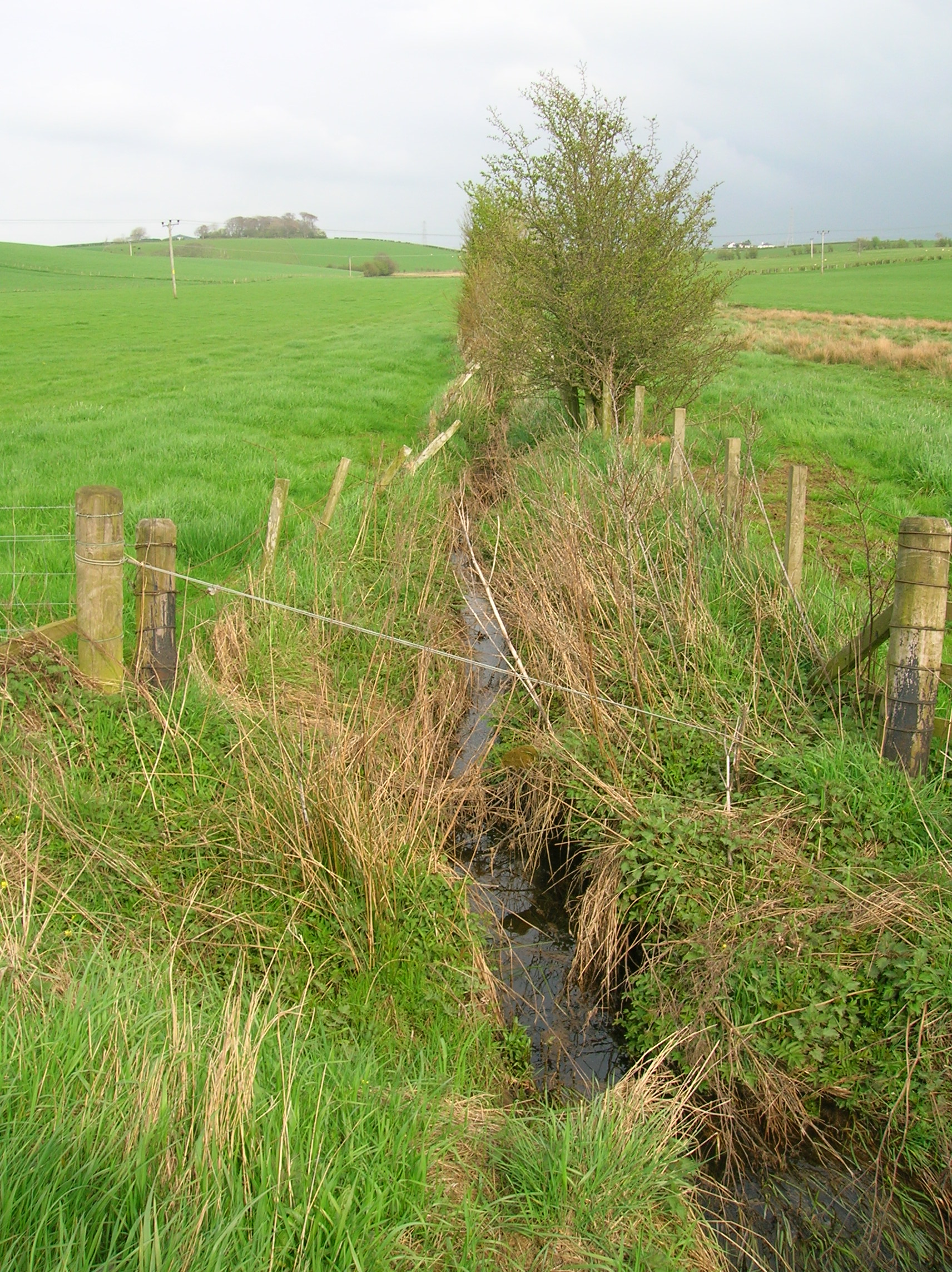
The Dalrympleston Burn running down towards the old loch site.

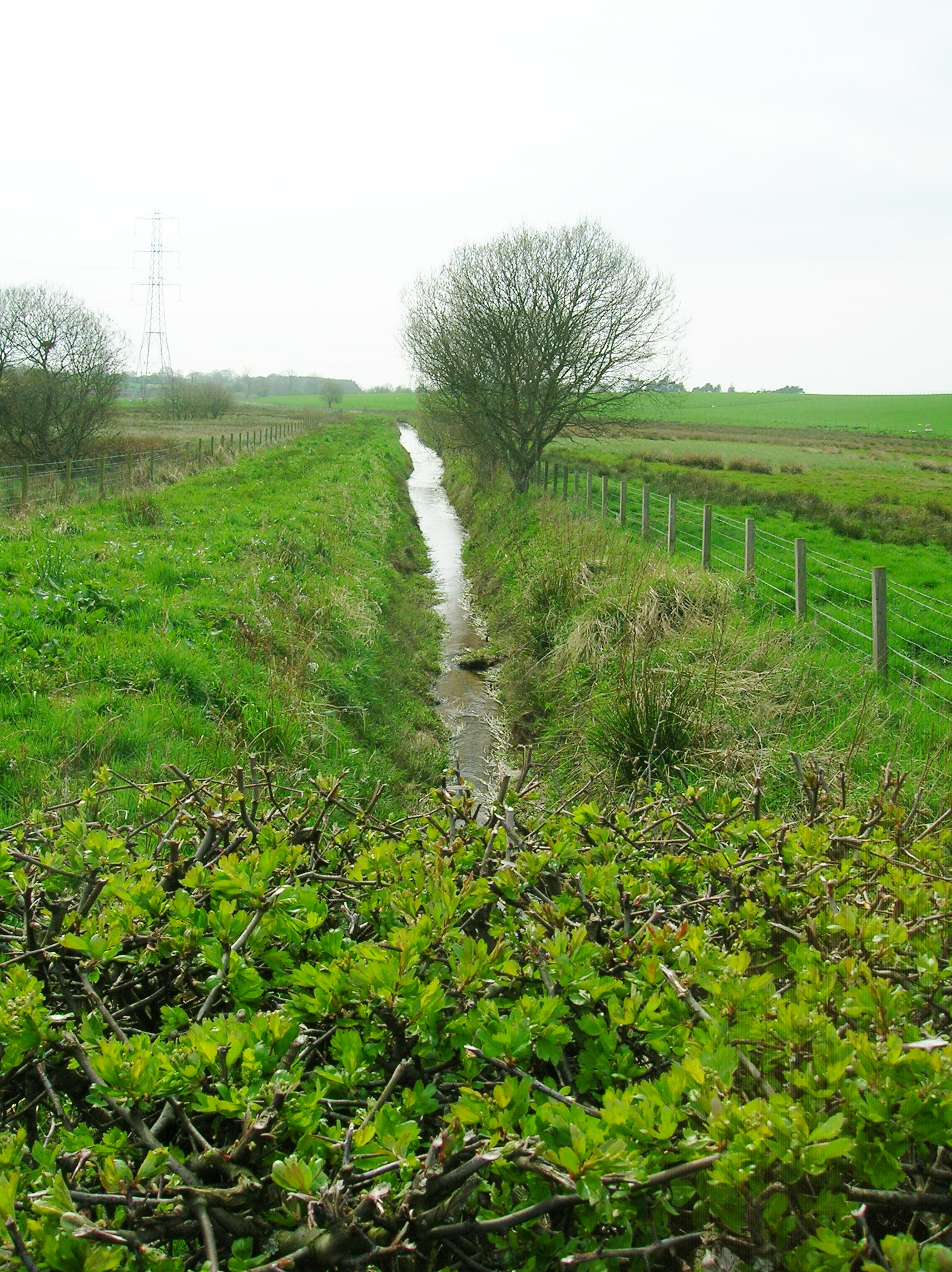
The drain and loch site looking towards the Water of Coyle.

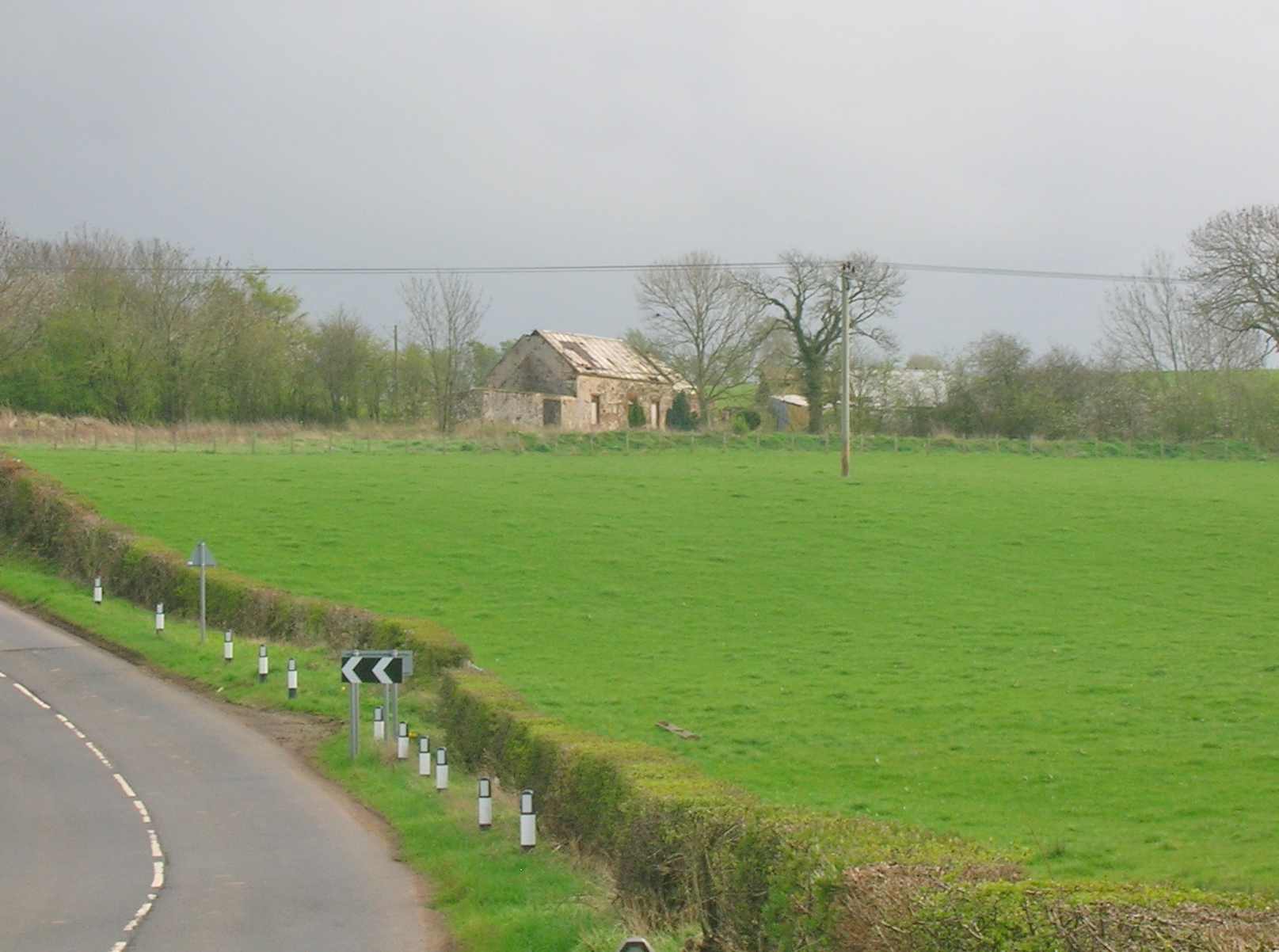
Dalrympleston Farm from the loch site.

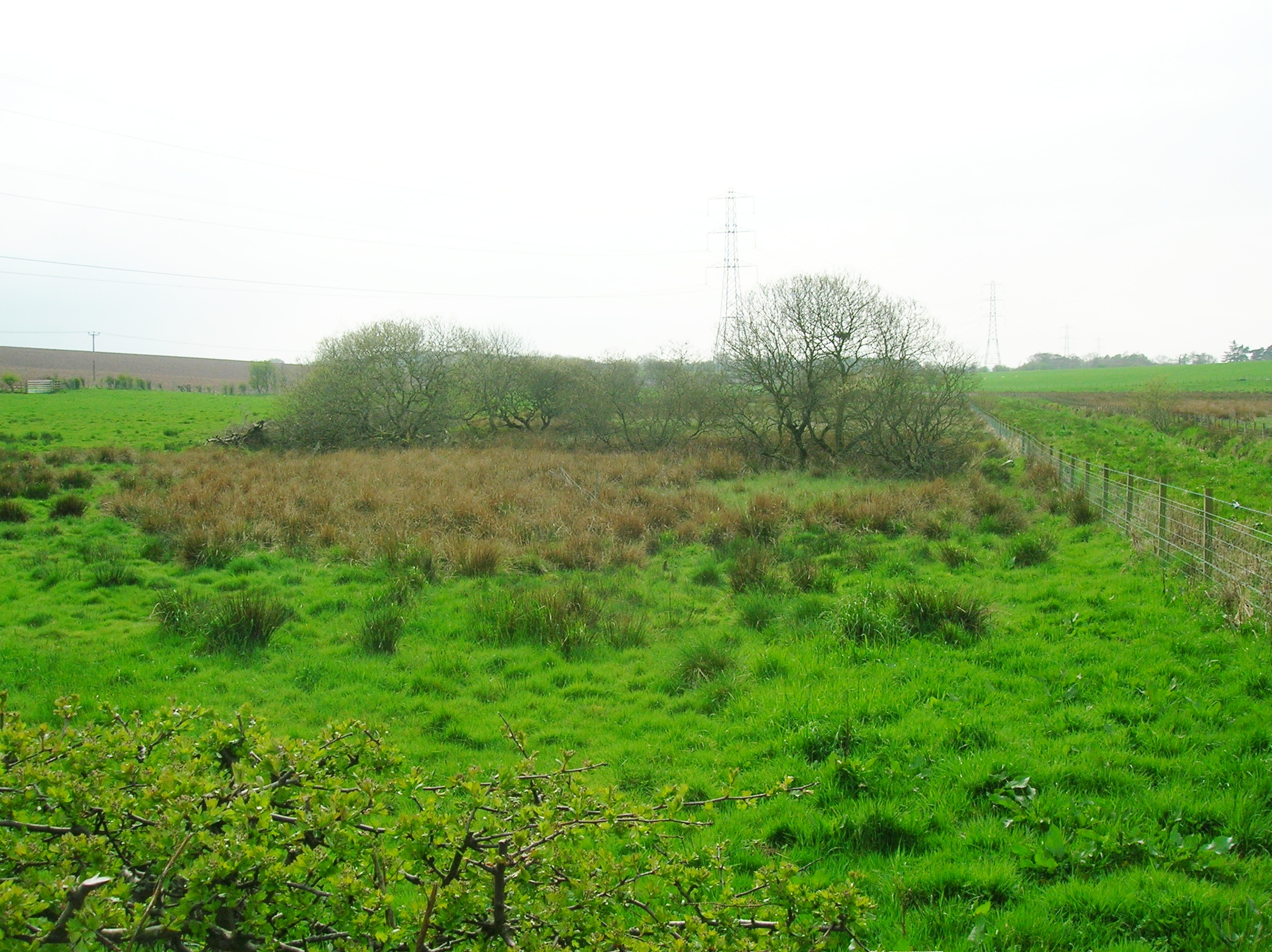
Willows on the site of the old loch island.

== See also ==
- List of castles in Scotland
- Stair
- Trabboch
- Loch of Stair
