= Stair House =

House in East Ayrshire, Scotland

Coordinates: 55.4831°N 4.4702°W

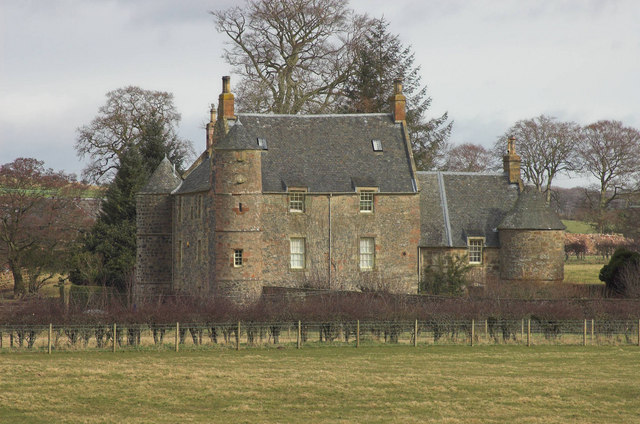
Stair House

Stair House is a late 16th- or early 17th-century house near the village of Stair, in Ayrshire, Scotland. It was the birthplace of John Dalrymple, 1st Earl of Stair (1648–1707). It remains in use as a house, and is a category A listed building.

In the 20th century it was owned by Robert 'Bobby' Corbett, second son of Lord Rowallan. His grave is in Stair churchyard.
