= Trabboch Castle =

Tower house in East Ayrshire, Scotland

- Stair, east Ayrshire, Scotland

Site information
- Owner: Trabboch Mains Farm
- Controlled by: Boyd clan
- Open to the public: No
- Condition: Ruined

Location
- Location within East Ayrshire
- Coordinates: 55.4684°N 4.4408°W
- Grid reference: grid reference NS 458 221

Site history
- Built: 14th century
- Materials: Stone

Trabboch Castle (NS 458 221) is a ruined L-plan tower house in the old Barony of Trabboch, Parish of Stair, East Ayrshire, Scotland.

== History ==
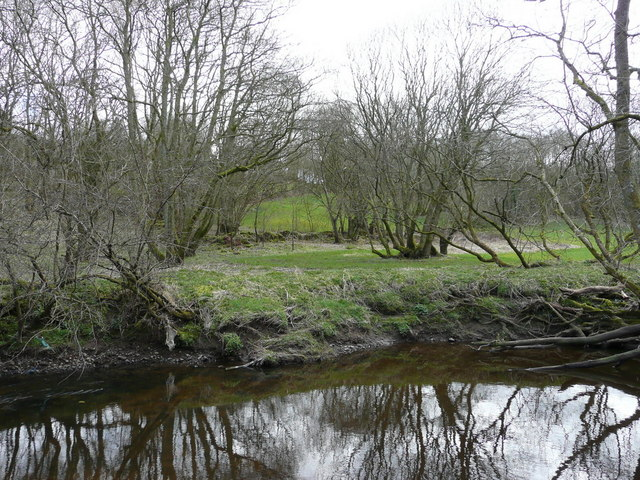
The site of the old Trabboch Mill

=== The Barony and lairds ===
The lands of Trabboch (pronounced 'Traaboch') are first recorded by name in a rental of 1303–4. King Robert the Bruce gave the 'L-plan' castle to the Boyds of Kilmarnock for services rendered at the Battle of Bannockburn in 1314, as revealed in an undated charter in the Register of the Great Seal, stating that King Robert I granted the 'lands of Trebach' in Kyle-Regis to Robert Boyd. Following the fall from favour of the Boyds in 1469 Paterson records that the fortalice of Trabach was forfeited to the crown, reportedly for the use of the eldest sons of the Kings of Scotland. The RCAHMS state By 1451 the lands had passed into the hands of William, Earl of Douglas and later to the Boswells of Auchinleck. In the 17th century Chalmers of Gadgirth and Reid of Barskimming held parts of the Barony of Trabboch. Love states that the Arthurs, Lord Ochiltree, and the Campbells of Loudoun also held Trabboch Castle.

As the caput of the Barony of Trabboch a moot hill would have existed and although no remains survive the nearby farm of Lawhill is suggestive of the location. The associated Mill of Trabboch stood on the Water of Coyle and was not powered by the loch waters.

Campbell sees Trabboch Castle as the only survivor of a defensive chain of castles that once ran across Kyle Regis and included Stair, Auchencloigh, Drongan, and Drumsuie.

=== The remnants and the castle ===
The remains of Trabboch Castle in 1954 consisted of an L-shaped portion of walling, with no windows or doors apparent, possibly sitting on a motte. The walls are 2.5m thick, with a height around 3.0m, constructed of massive rubble masonry, 9.0m long on the north-western section and 12.5m long on the south-western section. No window or door openings are visible. A broad natural ditch is visible on the western side and the shallow curvilinear ditch on the south side may have been part of the castle defences. Some finds were held by the proprietor of Trabboch Farm. Much of the castle stone was used to build the nearby Trabboch Mains Farm. The castle ruins are now protected as a scheduled monument.

A grave was found nearby (NS 458 221), placed beneath a cairn and cut out of the solid red sandstone, covered by a flagstone and containing some beads and blackish dust.

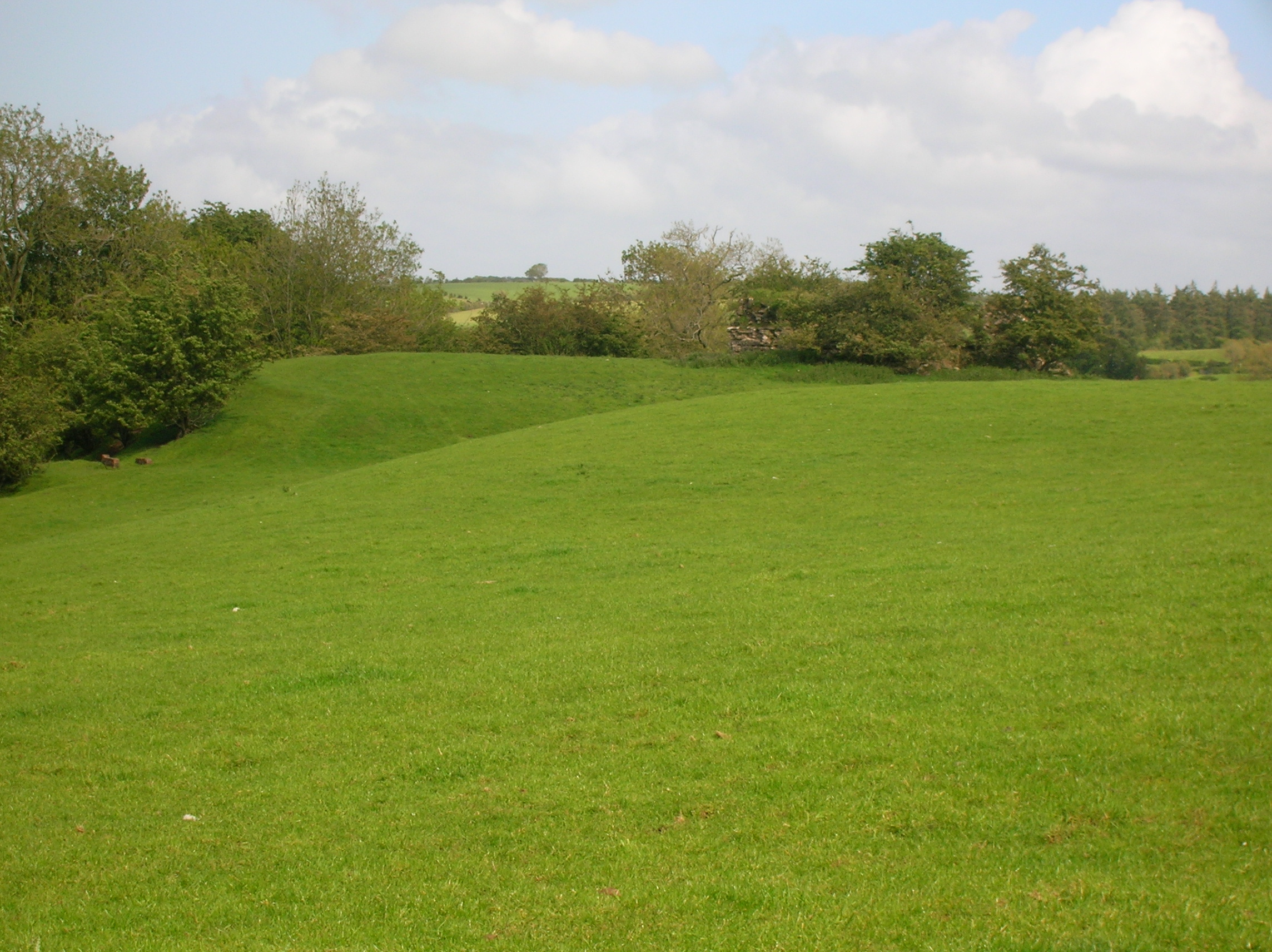
Trabboch Castle site and earthworks

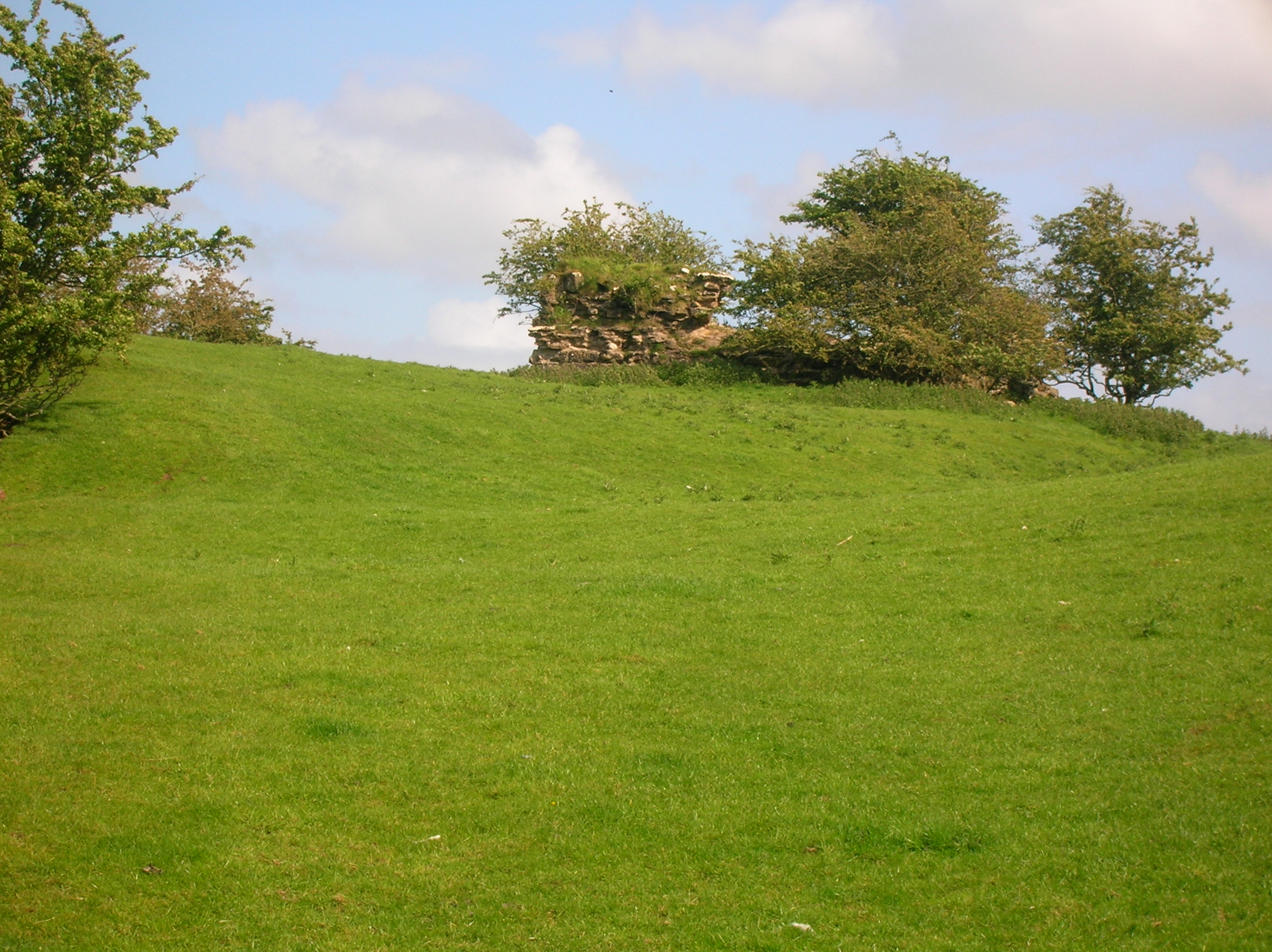
The castle ruins from the west

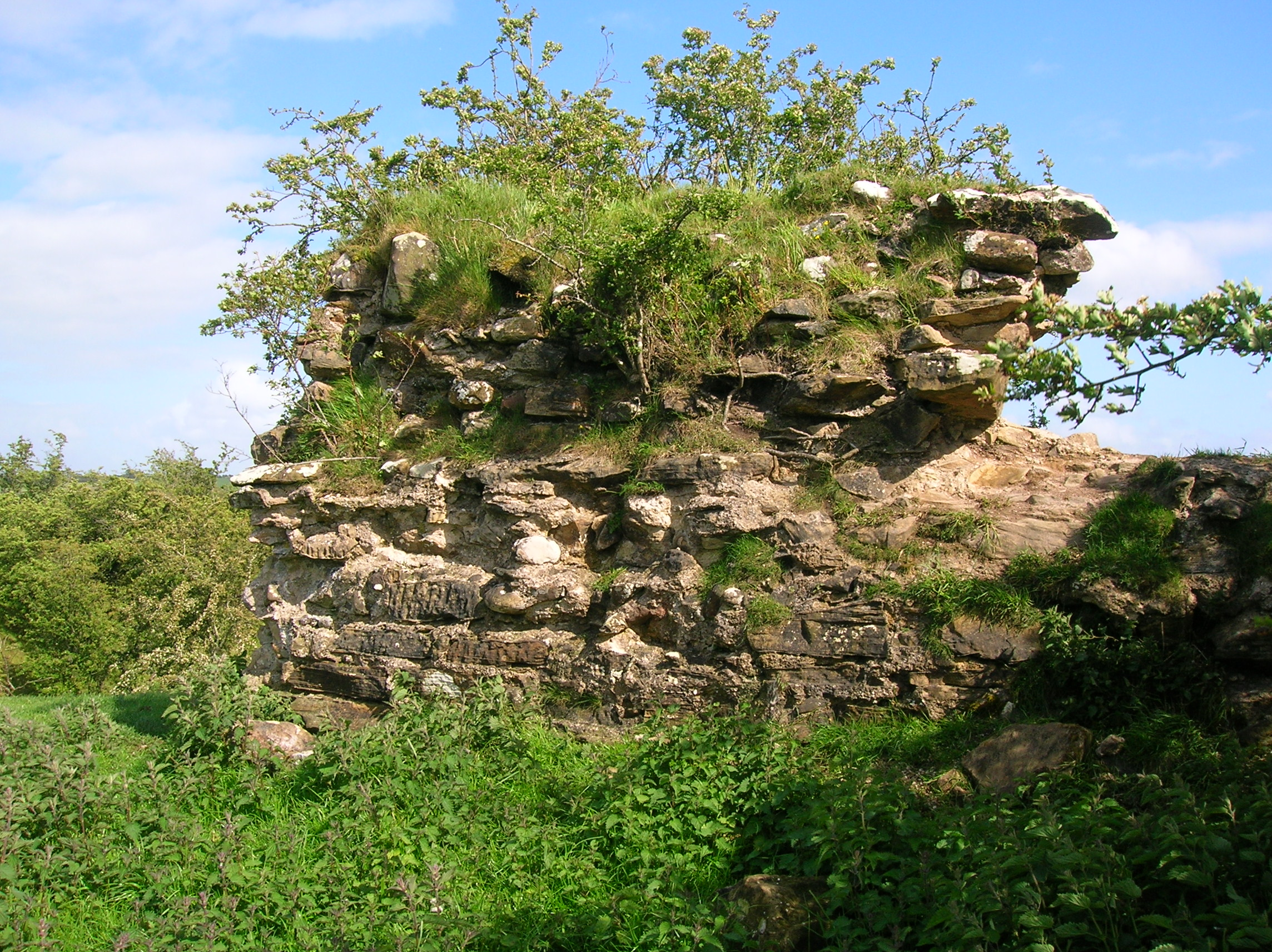
Details of the castle walls

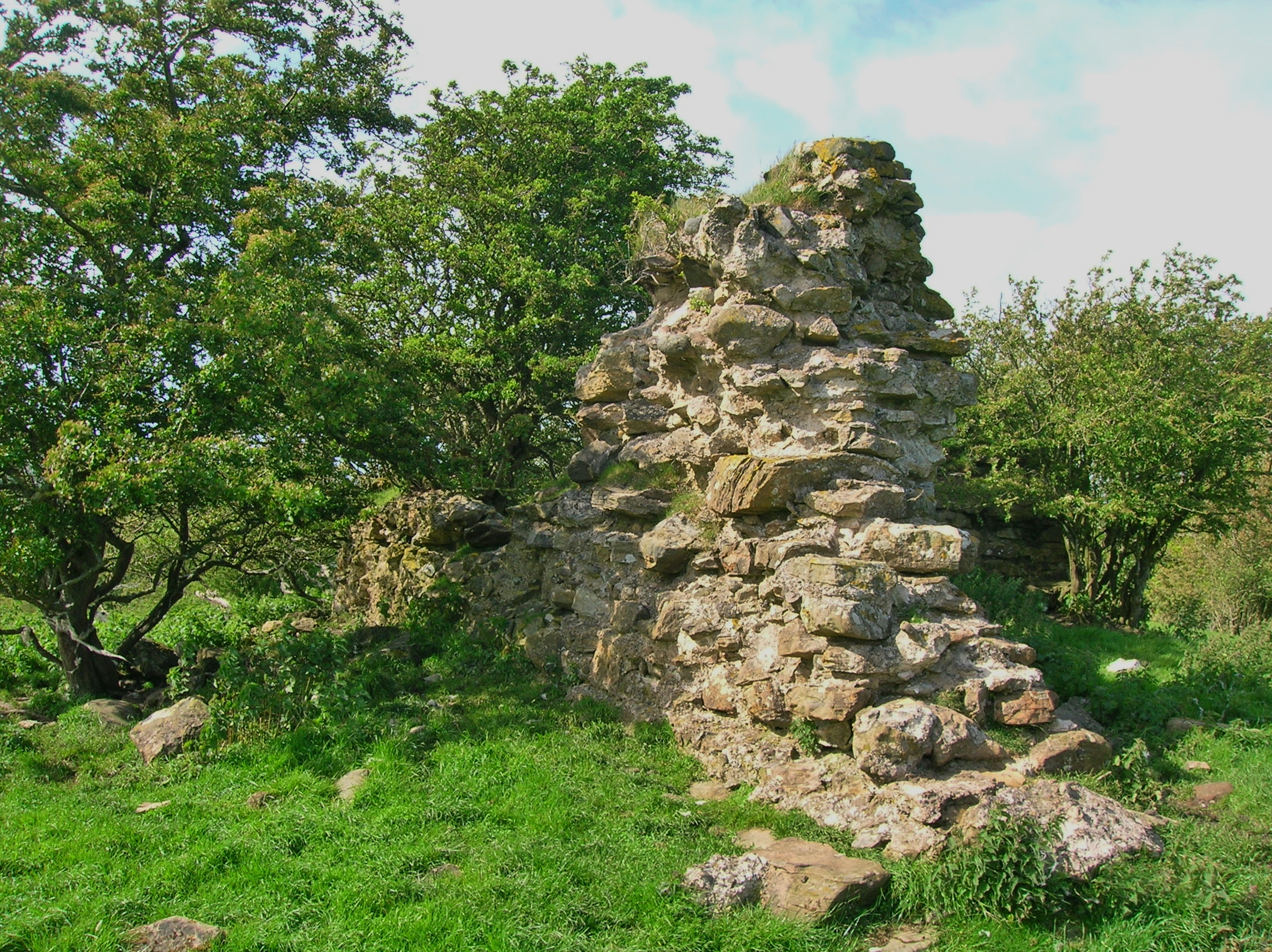
A south facing wall

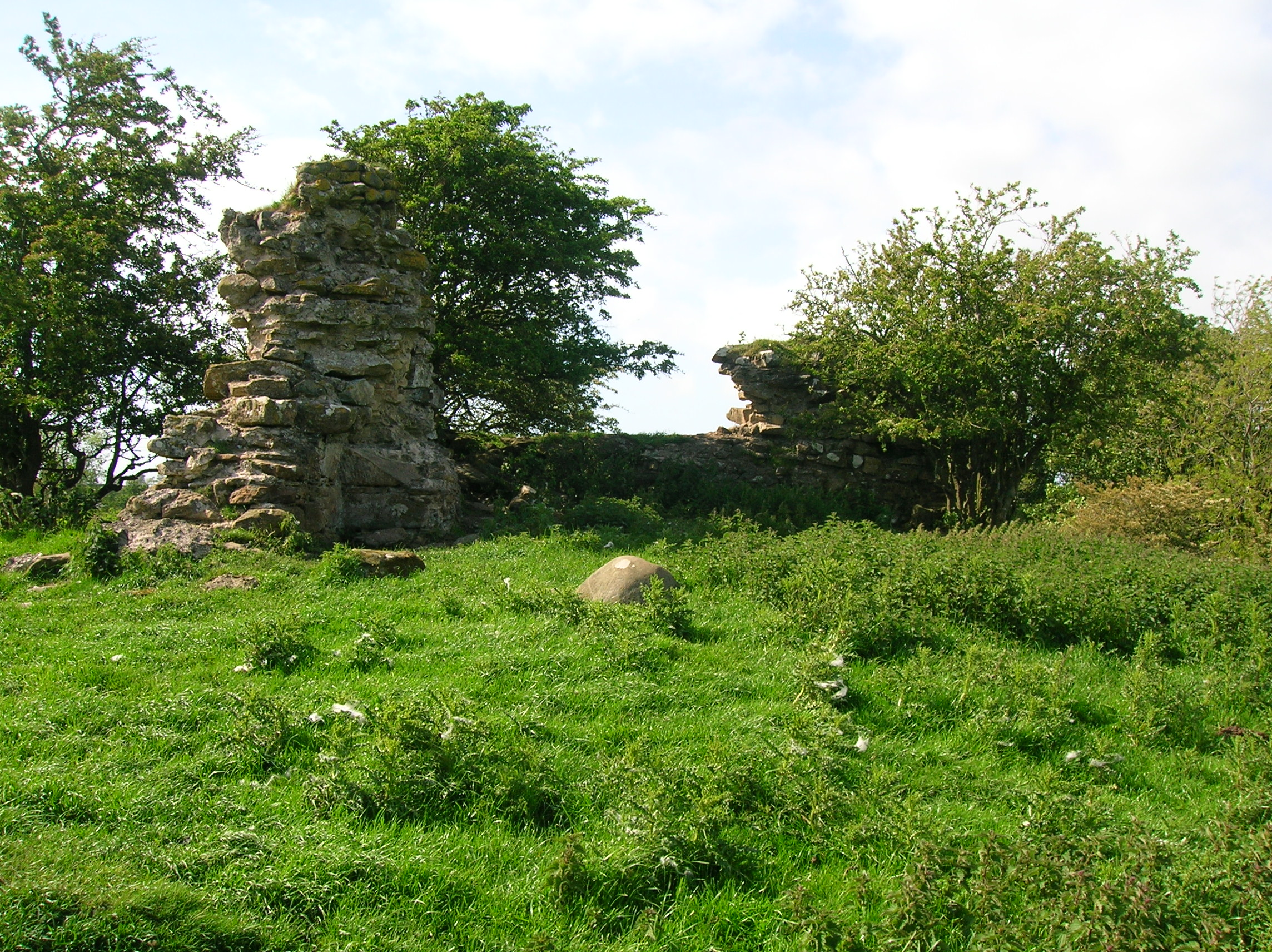
Castle ruins from the east

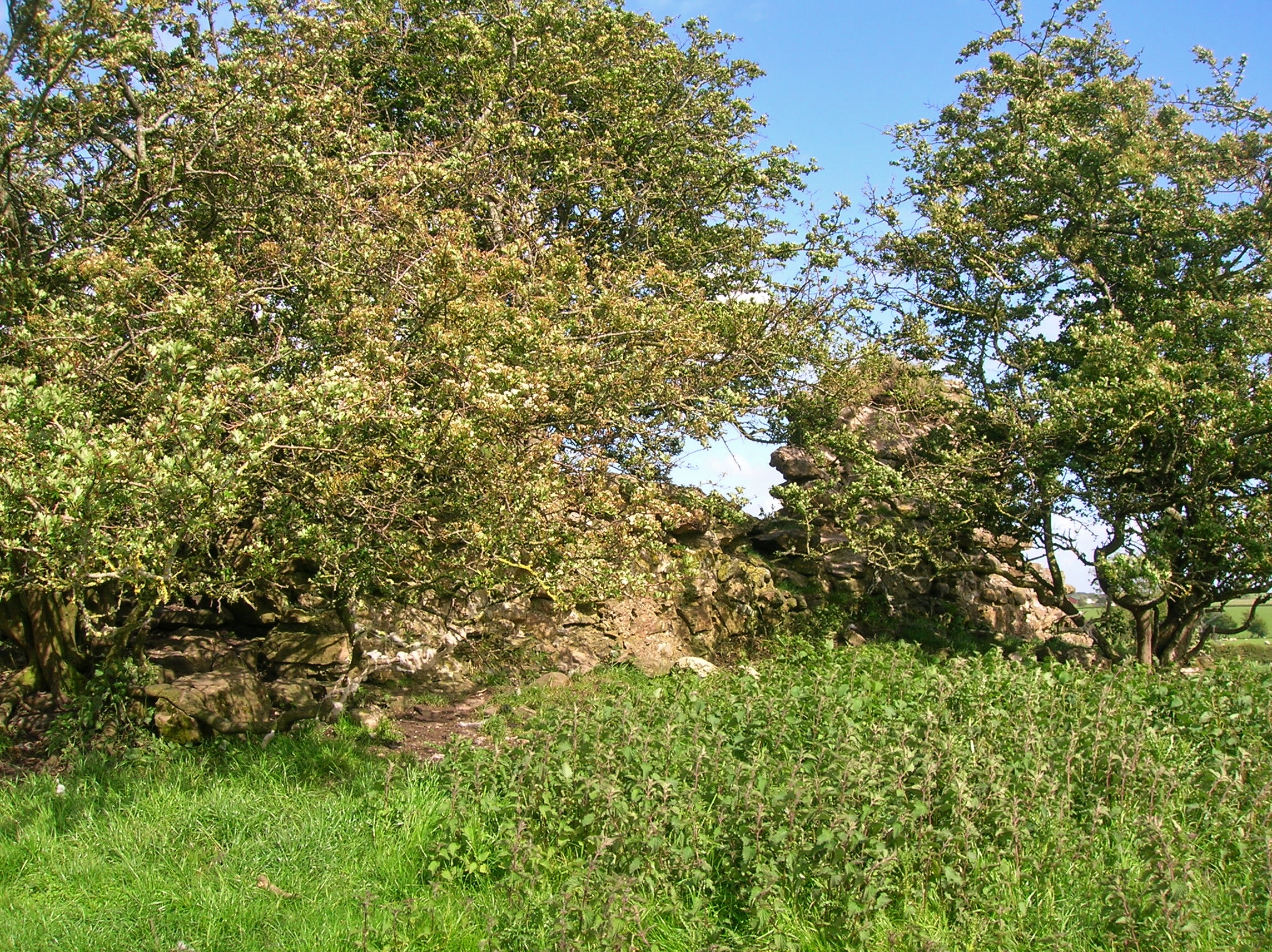
The view of the castle from the south-west

James Boswell of Auchinleck is recorded to have said that "I wish that my father would buy Trabboch mains, a beautiful farm now offered for sale by Sir John Whitefoord, as it was the very manor-place of the barony of Trabboch, and still has the vestigia of the old house still to be seen."

== Cartographic evidence ==
Gordon's map of 1636–52 shows Trabboch castle. Roy's map of 1747 marks both Trabog (Sic) and Lawhill Molls map of 1745 marks the castle. John Thomson's 1828 map marks Traboch Castle (Sic) clearly.

Location of Trabboch, East Ayrshire

== Loch of Trabboch ==
The ancient Loch of Trabboch was a site where swans, moor hens, and other waterfowl nested and as a site within the old Barony of Trabboch it was an area used for hunting and fishing by the laird. Trabboch Loch is a 19th-century site formed from the flooding of Drumdow pit.
