= Frank Jordan (footballer) =

English footballer (1883–1938)

Personal information
- Date of birth: 1883
- Place of birth: Southampton, England
- Date of death: 28 March 1938
- Place of death: Bitterne, England
- Height: 5 ft 10 in (1.78 m)
- Position: Inside forward

Senior career*
Years	Team	Apps	(Gls)
1905–1906	Southampton	0	(0)
1908–1910	Southampton	42	(5)
1910–1911	Reading		
1911–1912	Stoke	10	(2)
1912–19??	Merthyr Town		
–	Abertillery		
- * Club domestic league appearances and goals

Frank Jordan (1883– 28 March 1938) was an English professional footballer who played at inside-left for several clubs during the years prior to World War I.

== Football career ==
Jordan was born in Southampton and educated at Bevois Town school, before joining Southampton in 1905. After a year of reserve team football, Jordan moved to South Africa.

After two years in South Africa, Jordan returned to England and was re-signed by Southampton in the summer of 1908. He made his first-team debut on 16 September 1908, when he replaced Sam Shearer at inside-left against Crystal Palace. Although less skillful than Shearer, Jordan was a more "thrustful" player, more suited to Southern League football, and by December he had become the regular inside-left. Described as "fleet of foot and an agile dribbler", Jordan scored four goals from his 25 league appearances in 1908–09.

In the following season, he lost his place first to Sam Brittleton and then to Bob Carter, but was deployed occasionally on the left wing.

After two years with the "Saints", Jordan joined fellow Southern League club Reading in the summer of 1910, where he spent a year and later played for two further Southern League clubs, Stoke and Merthyr Town.

== Later career ==
When his football career was over, he returned to Southampton to live and found employment with the Southampton Gas and Coke Company where he remained for over 20 years up to his death. He was a member of his works cricket eleven as well as being secretary of the whist team.

== Career statistics ==
Appearances and goals by club, season and competition
Club	Season	League			FA Cup		Total	
Club	Season	Division	Apps	Goals	Apps	Goals	Apps	Goals
Stoke	1911–12	Southern League Division One	10	2	0	0	10	2
Career total			10	2	0	0	10	2
