= Stair Parish Church =

Church in East Ayrshire, Scotland

Coordinates: 55°28′53″N 4°28′15″W

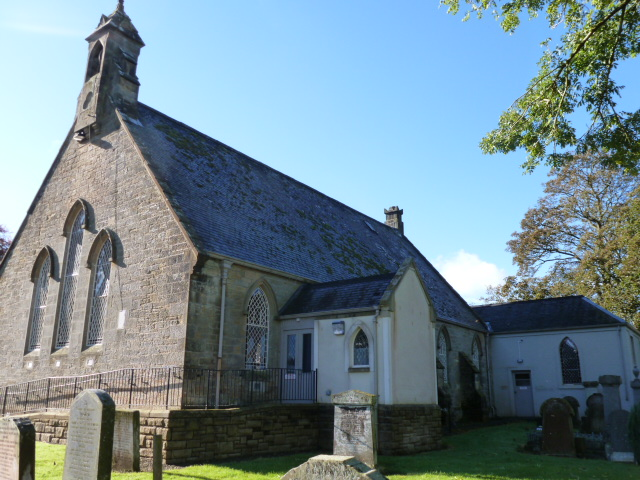
(2012)

Stair Church is located in Stair, East Ayrshire, Scotland.

== History ==
The Parish of Barnweill, in the old District of Kyle, was suppressed in 1673 and the larger part of the stipend was transferred to the minister of the newly erected Parish of Stair. Nearby Craigie had been disjoined from the Parish of Riccarton in 1647. It is said that the Earl of Stair was the prime mover in suppressing the parish because of the inconvenient horse ride he had to undertake to get to Barnweill Church from his home at Stair House. Until 1707, the Minister of Stair had to preach under an oak tree on the Fulton Estate to lawfully qualify for the stipends of Barnweill. A number of the old Barnweill parishioners joined the Symington Church.

== Architecture and fittings ==
The original church of circa 1706, replaced in 1864, was very simple in character with an earthen floor, resembling an abandoned hay shed and only the belfry on the gable end indicated its true purpose. It contained three lofts reserved for the local lairds, namely Barskimming, Stair, and Drongan. A manse was built in 1807, now renamed Glenstang; it was sold by the Church of Scotland in 1979.

== Gallery ==
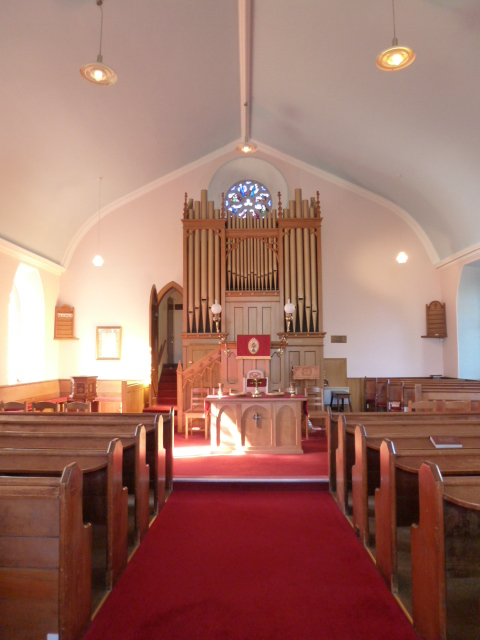
Aisle

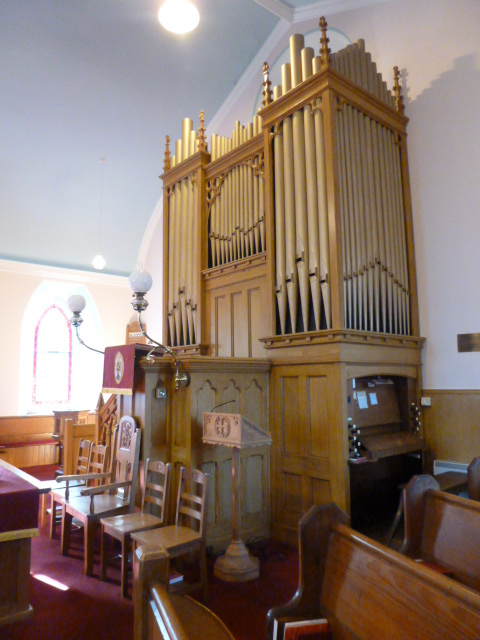
Organ

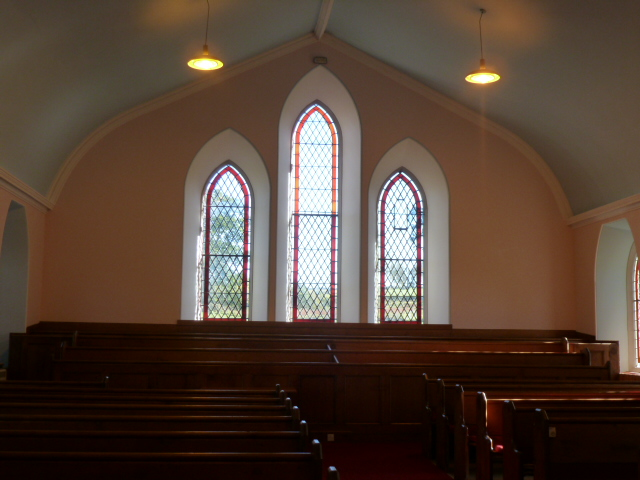
Stained glass windows

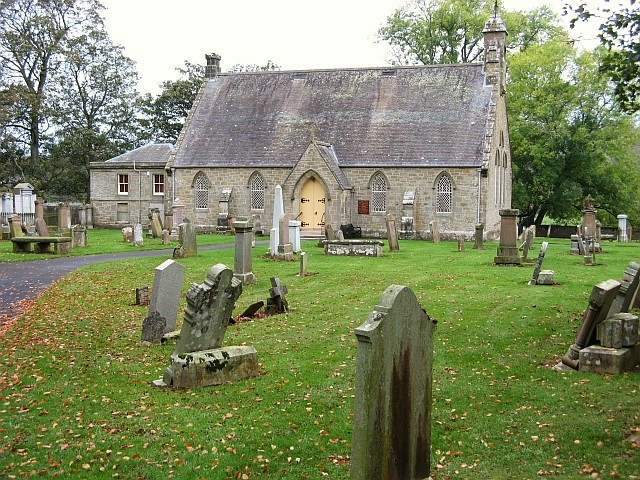
Graveyard

== See also ==
- Barnweill Church
