= Sam Brittleton =

English footballer (1885-1951)

Personal information
- Full name: Samuel Brittleton
- Date of birth: 17 June 1885
- Place of birth: Wharton, Cheshire, England
- Date of death: 4 October 1951 (aged 66)
- Height: 5 ft 8 in (1.73 m)
- Position: Inside forward

Youth career
- Winsford United

Senior career*
Years	Team	Apps	(Gls)
1905–1908	Stockport County	0	(0)
1908	Preston North End	0	(0)
1908–1909	Chorley		
1909–1910	Southampton	17	(3)
1911	Macclesfield	3	(1)
1912–1913	Chorley		
1913–1914	Accrington Stanley		
- * Club domestic league appearances and goals

Samuel Brittleton (17 June 1885 – 4 October 1951) was an English footballer who played at inside-left for various clubs in the 1900s. He was the brother of England international Tom Brittleton.

== Football career ==
Brittleton was born in Winsford, Cheshire and started his professional career at Stockport County in August 1905, a few months after his brother had left County to join Sheffield Wednesday. After three years with Stockport County, without breaking into the first team, he moved to Preston in February 1908 followed by a further move in the summer of 1908 to join Chorley of the Lancashire Combination.

At Chorley, Brittleton began to establish a reputation as a useful inside-forward and attracted the attention of several Football League clubs. In the summer of 1909, he had agreed to join Manchester City, who had just been relegated from the Football League First Division with the two clubs arguing over the size of the transfer fee. Before a deal could be completed, he was signed by Southampton of the Southern League.

He made his debut for the "Saints" in a 1–1 draw at Queens Park Rangers on 25 September 1909, when he replaced Frank Jordan at inside-left. Described as "sometimes brilliant, sometimes hopeless", Brittleton lost his place in the side after a run of nine matches, with Bob Carter replacing him. In March, after an injury to John Bainbridge, Carter moved to outside-right with Brittleton being recalled at inside-left. He marked his recall by scoring in a 1–1 draw at West Ham followed by another goal a week later against Portsmouth.

In the summer of 1909, Brittleton decide to return to North West England although Southampton retained his registration. He was released a year later and rejoined his former club, Chorley before spending a year at Accrington Stanley.
