= Stair, East Ayrshire =

Hamlet in East Ayrshire, Scotland

Coordinates: 55°28′51″N 4°28′13″W

Stair
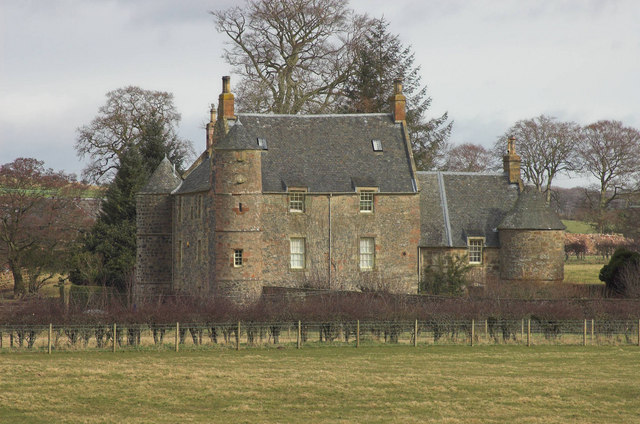
- Stair House

- Location within East Ayrshire
- Council area: East Ayrshire
- Country: Scotland
- Sovereign state: United Kingdom
- Police: Scotland
- Fire: Scottish
- Ambulance: Scottish

Stair is a parish in East Ayrshire, Scotland. It lies at the bottom of a glen beside the River Ayr at the north-west border of the 5,376 acre (22 km^{2}) Parish of Stair where the River Ayr is joined by the Glenstang Burn.

== History ==
The parish is known for its connection with the Dalrymples, Earls of Stair. The family first became associated with the village in 1450, when William de Dalrymple acquired the lands of Stair-Montgomery and built Stair House. Formerly part of the Parish of Ochiltree, Stair was made a separate parish in 1653 at the request of James Dalrymple, 1st Viscount of Stair.

Places of interest in the parish include Stair Brig built in 1745 and Stair House. Dalmore House stood overlooking the River Ayr until destroyed by fire in 1969.

The "Stair Fair" at the Stair Parish Church churchyard was the equivalent of the Mauchline Holy Fair and was equally wild with people travelling from miles around and staying several days until every last item of food and drink had been consumed. A "Fair Stair Sacrament" was an expression used to describe a good hearty meal at which everything was eaten for many years after the fair ceased to be held.

== Milton ==
At the old Clachan of Milton on the other side of the bridge from Stair which lies in South Ayrshire, there used to be an inn here at which Robert Burns would stop on occasion and here also was the end of the old pack horse road to Annbank that once followed the course of the river. Opposite the inn was once an old toll house and nearby was the thatched cottage in which Mailly Crosbie lived, onetime housekeeper at Stair House. The miller here was one of the Covenanter martyrs who gave his life by refusing to hand over his bible to the king's soldiers.

== Links with Robert Burns ==
Margaret or Peggy Orr was a nurserymaid at Stair House and Robert Burns lent a hand as a 'blackfoot' with his friends courtship of this lady, however the engagement was brief and she later married John Paton, an Edinburgh shoemaker. In his first 'Epistle to Davie' entitled 'An Epistle to Davy, a Brother-Poet, Lover, Ploughman and Fiddler, Burns wrote :-

:There's a' the pleasures o' the heart,
:The lover an' the frien' ,
:You hae your Meg,
:your dearest part,
:And I my darling Jean.

Catherine Stewart of Stair and Afton Lodge, the wife of Major-General Alexander Stewart, became aware of 'Robert Burns the poet' through his visits with David and she was the first member of the upper classes to acknowledge his ability and befriend him. Burns sent her a number of his poems in a document known as the 'Stair Manuscripts'.

Burns would visit the thatched cottage at the Clachan of Milton in which Mailly Crosbie lived, onetime housekeeper at Stair House and a friend from the days of David Sillars attempts at courtship. The family kept the handleless cup from which Burns used to drink as a souvenir.

== Views in Stair ==
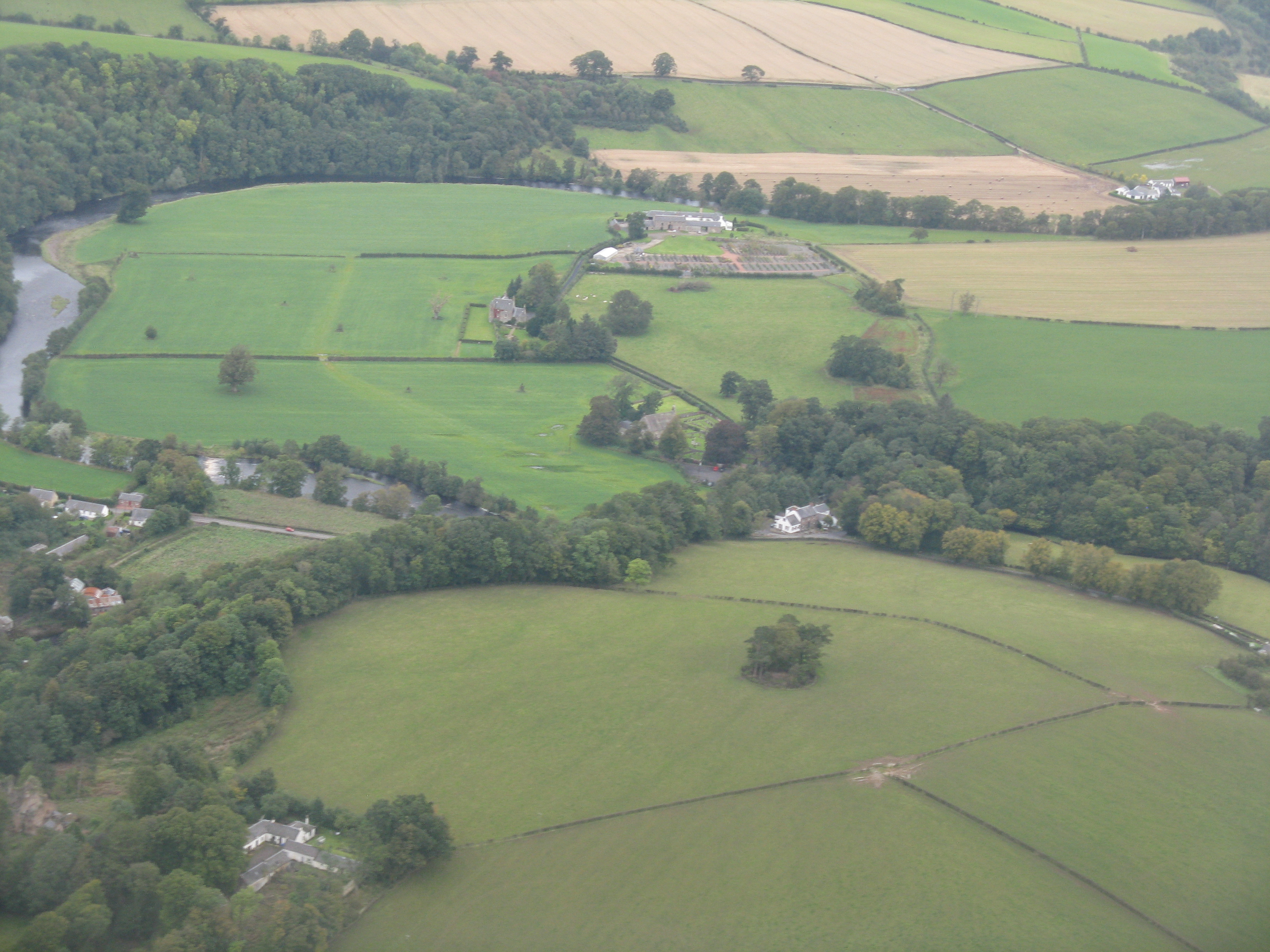
Stair and Stair House Farm

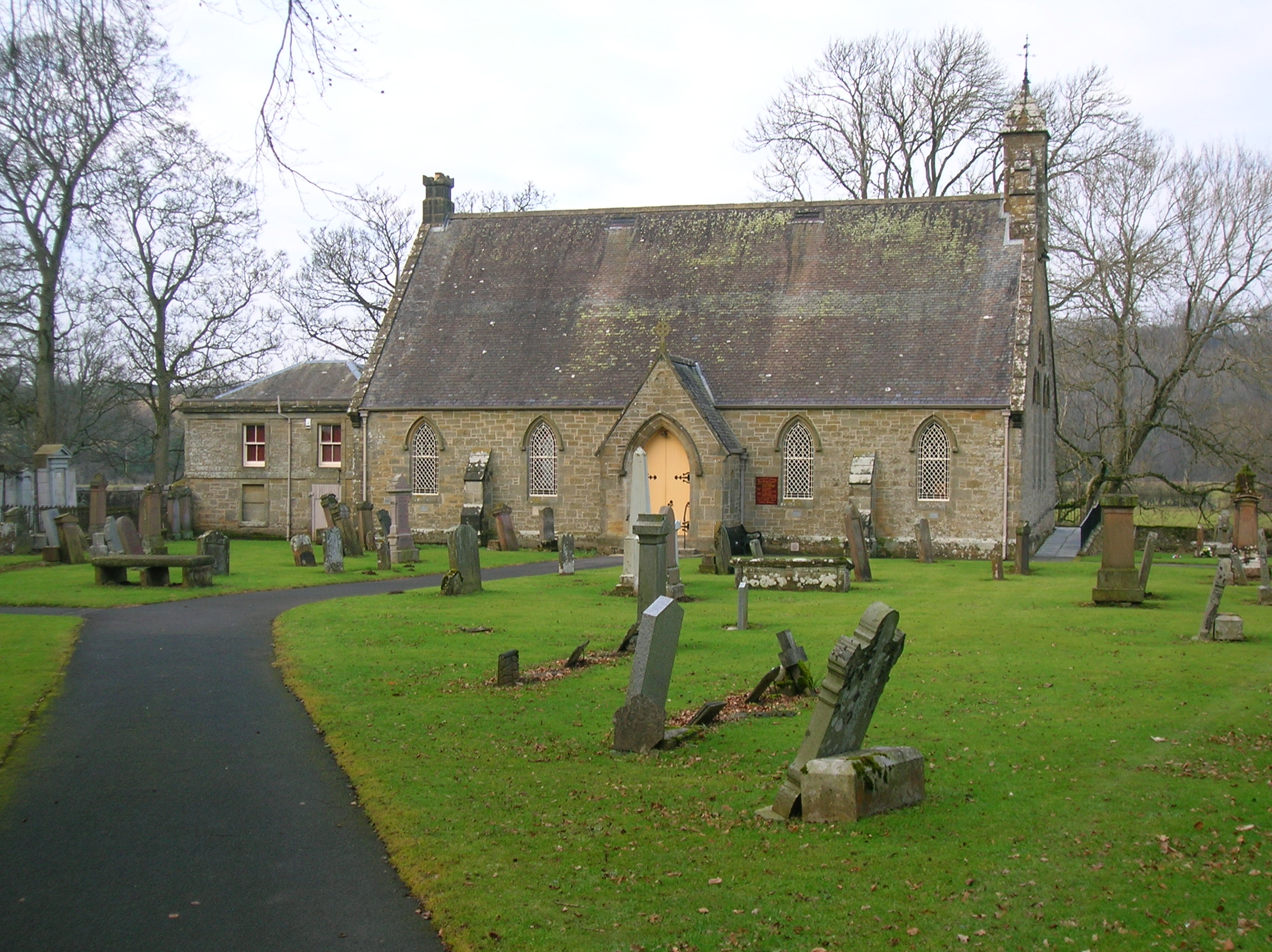
Stair church

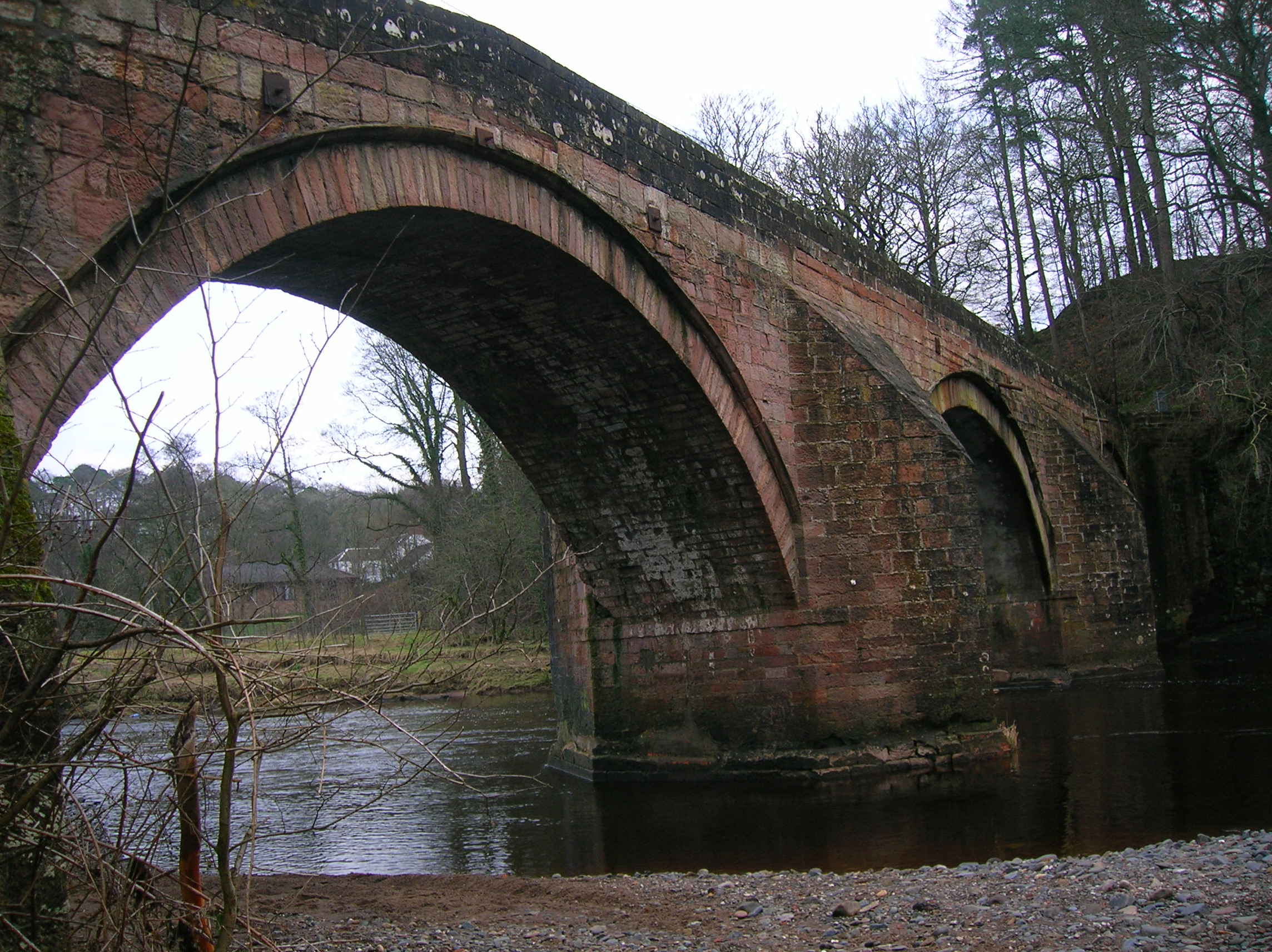
Stair Bridge over the River Ayr

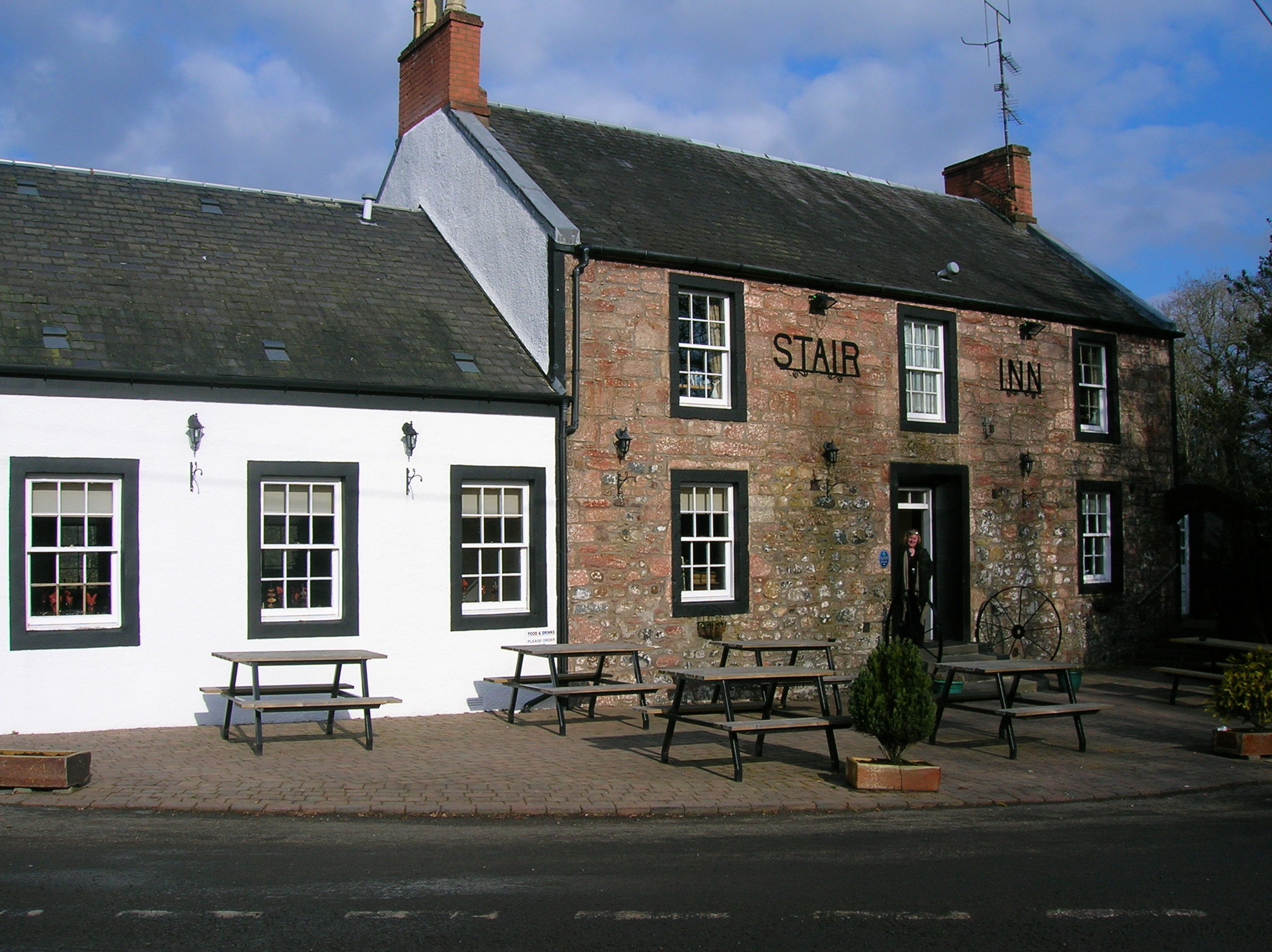
The Stair Inn

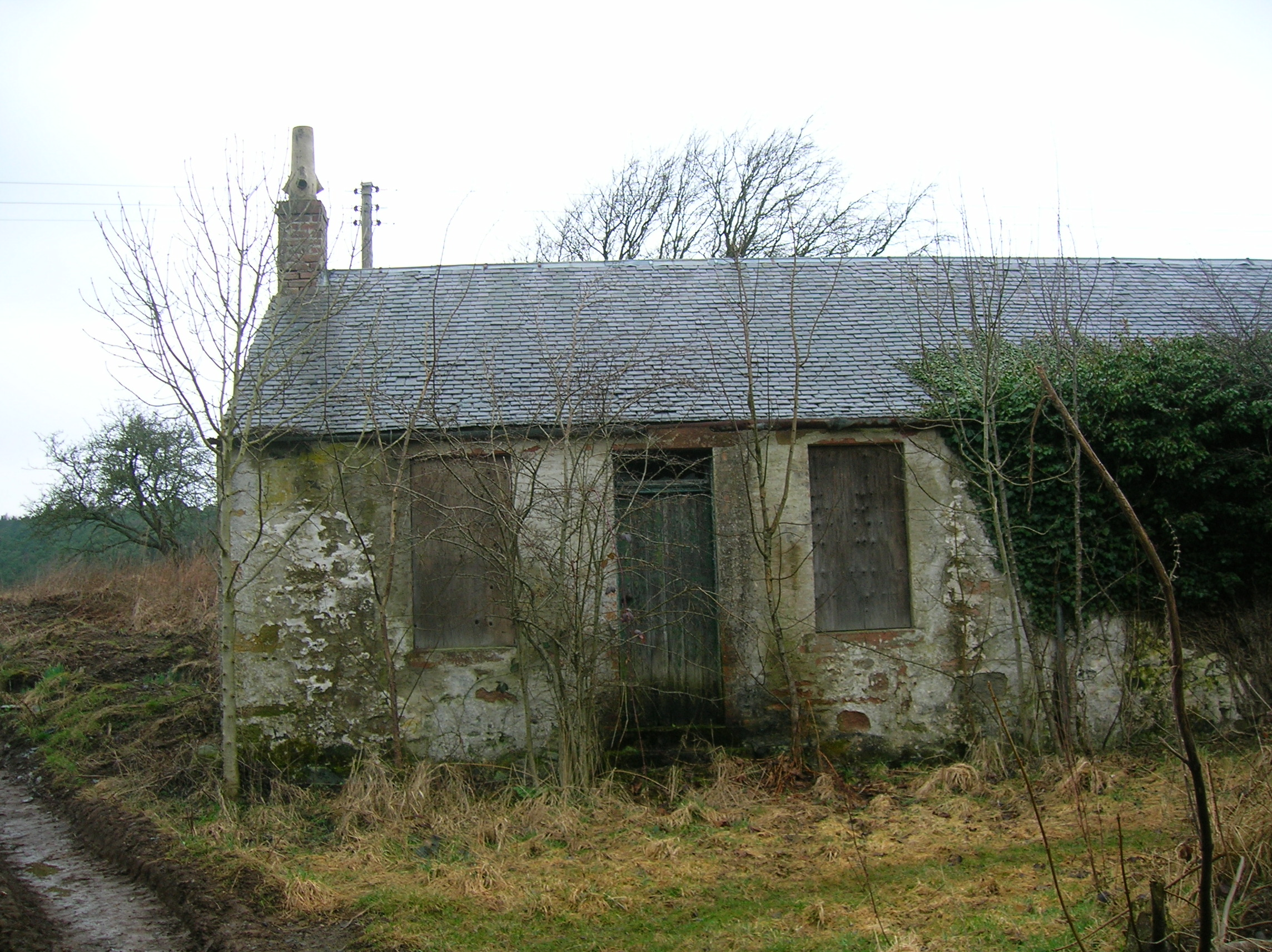
Cottages at Milton Mill

== See also ==
- Trabboch
- Dalmore House and Estate
- James Dalrymple, 1st Viscount of Stair (1619–1695), Scottish lawyer and politician
- John Dalrymple, 1st Earl of Stair (1648–1707), son of the previous
- John Dalrymple, 2nd Earl of Stair (1673–1747), son of the previous
- Loch of Stair
- Loch of Trabboch

== Bibliography ==
- Barber, Derek (2000). Steps through Stair. Stair Parish Church.
- Boyle, A. M. (1996). The Ayrshire Book of Burns-Lore. Darvel : Alloway Publishing. ISBN 0-907526-71-3.
- Mcvie, John (1927). Burns and Stair. Kilmarnock : The Standard Press.
- Nimmo, John W. (2003). Symington Village, Church and People. Darvel : Alloway Publishing. ISBN 0-907526-82-9.
