= Loch of Stair =

Coordinates: 55°28′41.0″N 4°25′13.5″W

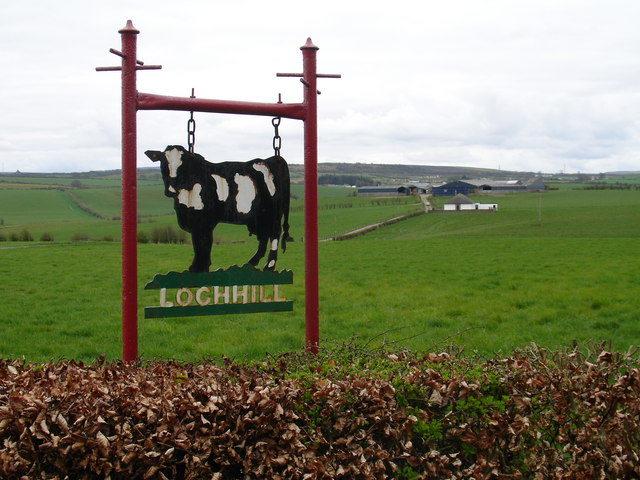
- Lochhill Farm above the old loch

- Previous location of the Loch of Stair, East Ayrshire
- Location: Stair, East Ayrshire, Scotland
- Type: Drained freshwater loch
- Primary inflows: Muirston Burn
- Primary outflows: Glenslang Burn
- Basin countries: Scotland
- Max. length: circa 680 ft (210 m)
- Max. width: circa 350 ft (110 m)
- Average depth: Shallow
- Islands: None

The Loch of Stair was a typical Ayrshire post-glacial 'Kettle Hole', situated in a low-lying area below the farm of Loch Hill, in the Parish of Stair, East Ayrshire, Scotland. This freshwater loch was drained in the 19th century, leaving a wetland area which still periodically floods.

== History ==
The loch is recorded as the 'Loch of Stair' in 1654 and Stair Loch in 1747. A roughly circular water body with a single outflow and no inflow burn or rivulet.

=== Drainage ===
The loch's drainage may have begun in the 18th century when Alexander Montgomerie, 10th Earl of Eglinton, was pursuing a number of agricultural improvements on his extensive estates and other landowners followed his example. Intensive drainage work may have taken place in the 1740s as part of the improvements undertaken to provide employment for Irish estate workers during the Irish potato famines of the 1740s and the mid 19th centuries. Many drainage schemes also date to the end of World War I when soldiers returned en masse to civilian life. The first OS maps do not show the loch site as having any open water, however the 1926 OS map shows a small loch present.

=== Usage ===
The loch's outflow was via the Glenslang Burn that had powered the old Bridgend Mill at Stair.

=== Cartographic evidence ===
Blaeu's map of 1654, dating from Timothy Pont's survey of circa 1604, clearly shows and names the loch and indicates only an outflow to the River Ayr via the Glenslang Burn. Roy's map of 1747 clearly show a Stair Loch. Armstrong's map of 1775 shows a loch with an inflow and outflow with a dwelling known as Loch Side nearby. Ainslie's map of 1821 shows a 'drop-shaped' loch with Lochside marked. Thomson map of 1832 shows the loch and the dwelling of Loch Hill.

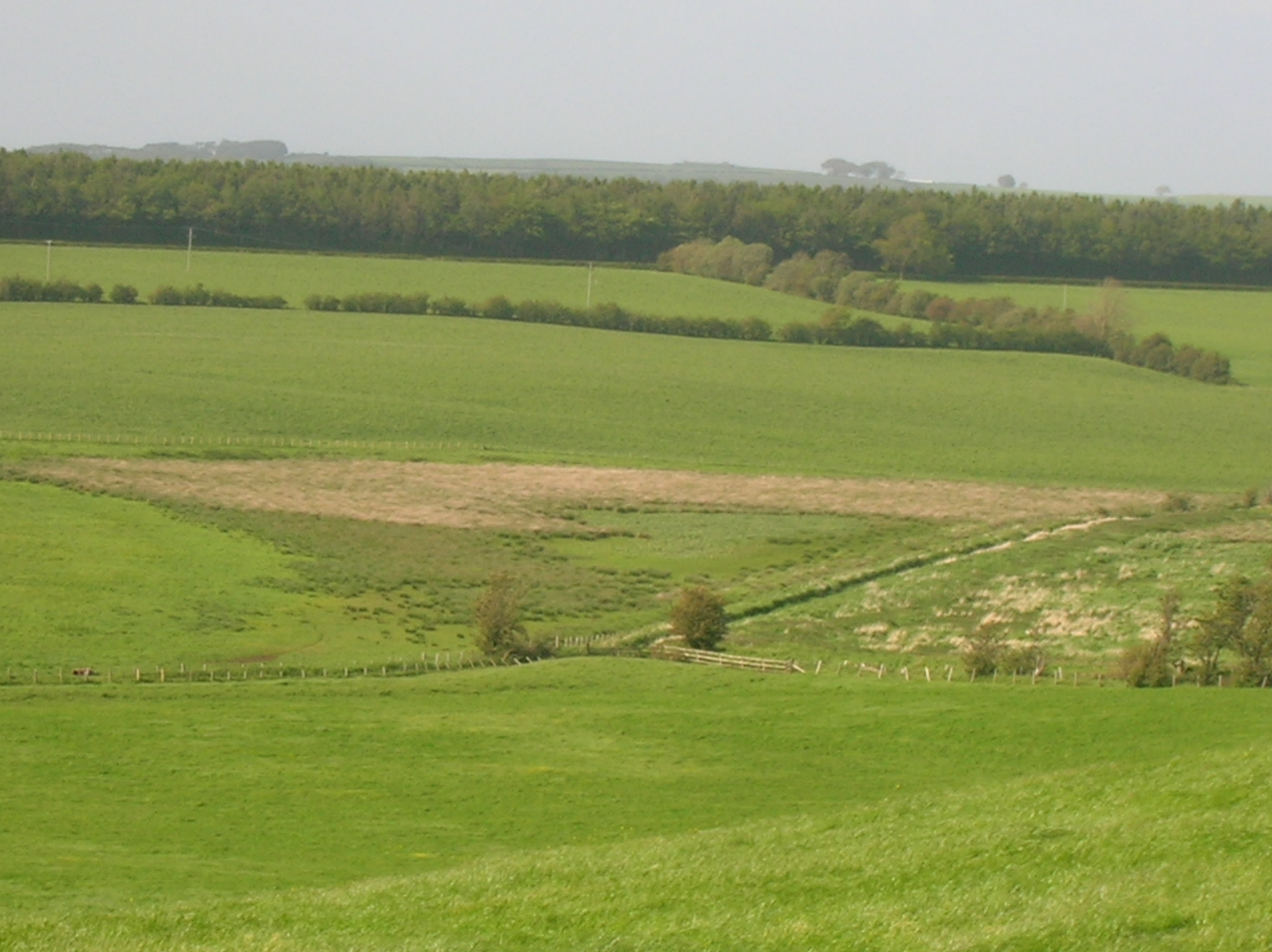
The site of the Loch of Stair

== Micro-history ==
In Scots the term 'Slang' as in 'Glenslang' refers to a strip of land used for grazing animals.

== See also ==
- Stair, East Ayrshire
