= Trabboch =

Hamlet in East Ayrshire, Scotland

Coordinates: 55.46874°N 4.44354°W

Trabboch is a hamlet in East Ayrshire, Scotland. Built as a miners' village in the 1880s, it was owned and leased by Wm. Baird & Co., Ltd. and at one time had 94 dwellings. The miners' rows stood, until demolition in 1969, on the Stair and Littlemill road, about two miles south of Stair, in that parish. The name is locally pronounced 'Traaboch'.

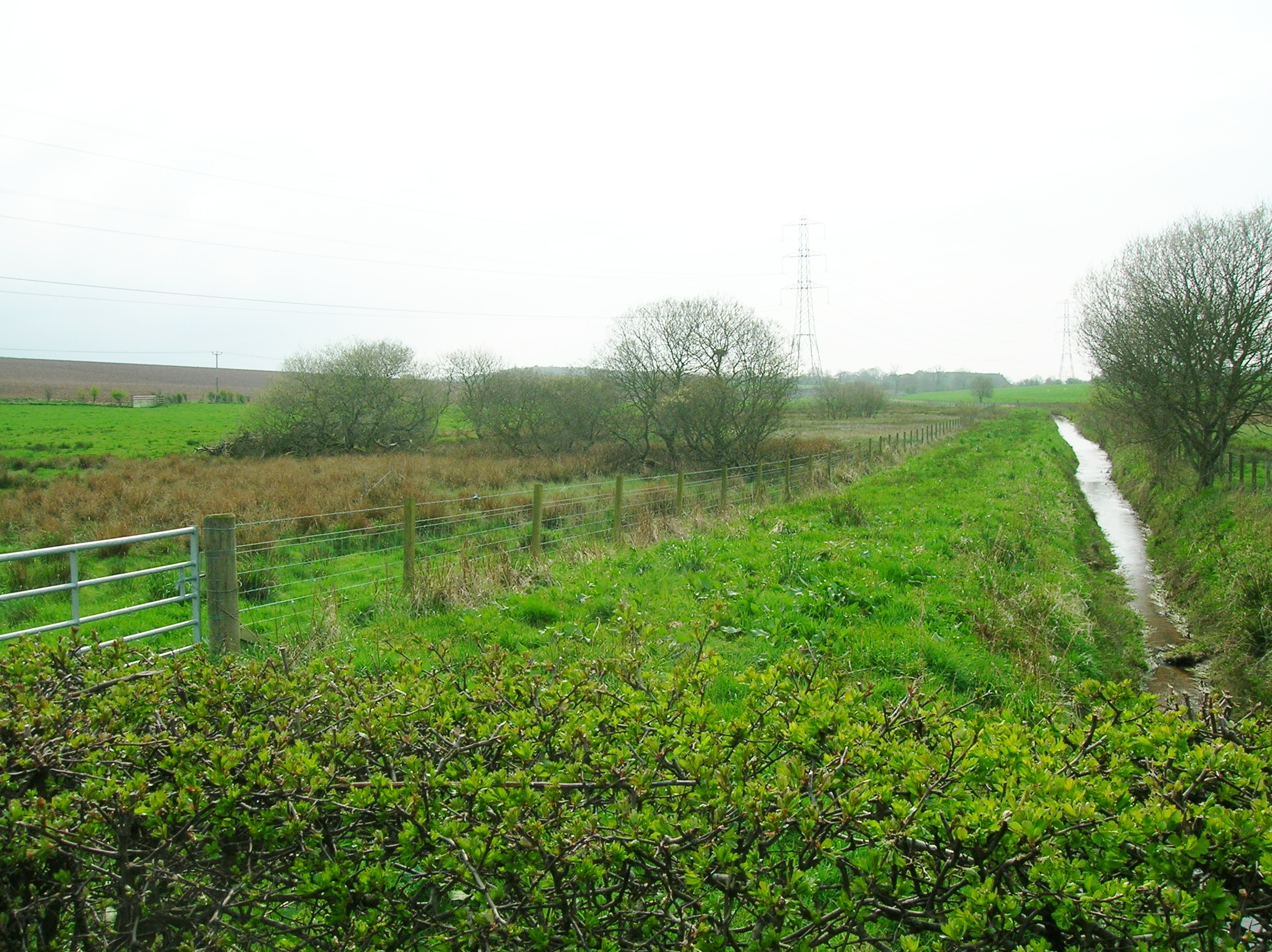
The site of the old Loch of Trabboch.

== History ==
=== Etymology ===
The name Trabboch was first attested in 1303 as Trebathe and it has a Brittonic origin. The first part of the name is the element treβ-, denoting a habitation and the land associated with it (Welsh tref "a town", traditionally "a farm"). The second element could be either -*bedu meaning "birch trees" (Welsh bedw), or -*beδ, "a grave" (Welsh bedd). The present form shows influence from the Gaelic element beitheach meaning "of birches". Trabeattie, near Torthorwald in Dumfriesshire may have the same etymology.

=== The Village and coal mines ===
The mining settlement was made up of four rows, one of 40 and three of 18 houses each, with a population of around 430. The Trabboch pit closed in 1908 and the Drumdow pit closed a few years later. Nearby Trabboch House was home to the proprietor of the coal pits. The workings form a sizeable new 'loch' and the waste material bings are still a prominent feature. Many of the villagers were moved to Drongan when the miners' rows were demolished.

After the closure of the local mines, for a time some of the miners caught the train to Skares where they worked at Whitehill Colliery whilst others found work at Burnockhill Colliery that was located in the locality.

Location of the hamlet of Trabboch, East Ayrshire

=== Stair school ===
Stair school opened in 1863 and was located in Trabboch. It always served as the Village Hall and later served as the Stair Community Centre. The school became a junior secondary with as many as 150-200 pupils, closing in 1969, Miss Brown being the last headteacher.

=== Trabboch Castle and Barony ===
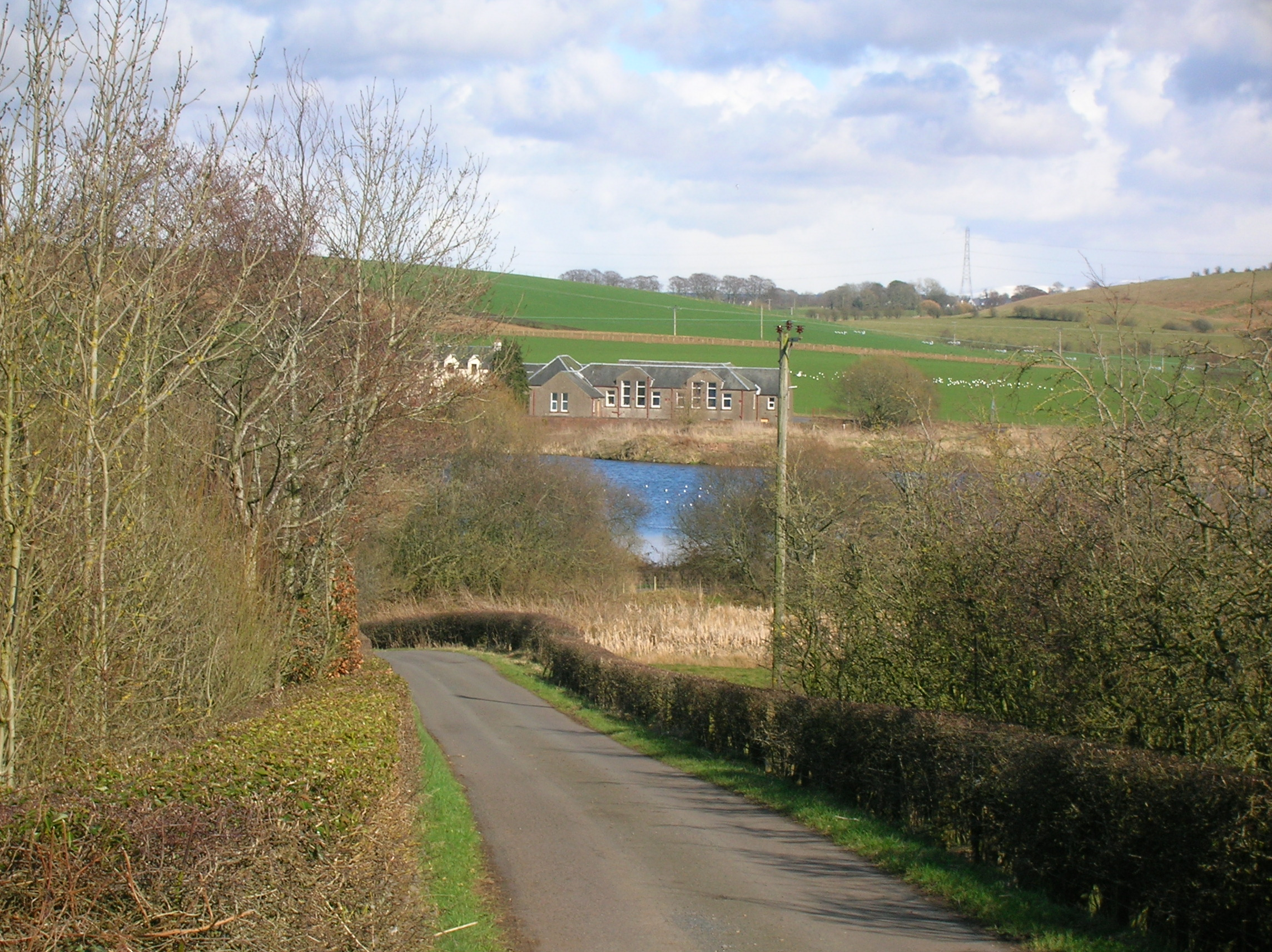
The old school Community Centre and Trabboch Loch, from the old railway station.

The hamlet is also known for the old castle in the area, Trabboch Castle. The lands of Trabboch are first recorded by name in a rental of 1303–4. King Robert the Bruce gave the castle to the Boyds of Kilmarnock for services rendered at the Battle of Bannockburn. By 1451, the lands had passed into the hands of William, Earl of Douglas, and later to the Boswells of Auchinleck. In the 17th century, Chalmers of Gadgirth and Reid of Barskimming held parts of the Barony of Trabboch. The associated Mill of Trabboch stood on the Water of Coyle and was not powered by the loch waters. Trabboch Mains is a farm that was built mainly using stone taken from the nearby Trabboch Castle.

=== Trabboch Station ===
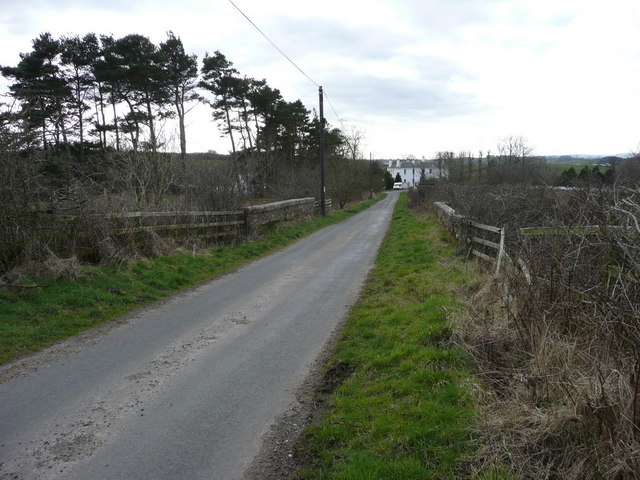
Trabboch House.

Trabboch railway station was situated on the Ayr and Cumnock Branch of the Glasgow and South Western Railway. The station was originally part of the Ayr and Cumnock Branch on the Glasgow and South Western Railway. The station opened in 1872 and closed on 10 September 1951.

=== The Trabboch Lochs ===
Trabboch Loch is nearby, formed from the flooded mineworkings of Drumdow Colliery in the late 19th century. The Loch of Trabboch was an ancient glacial loch, later a curling pond and the remnant is a wetland, important for birdlife.

=== The Shaw Kirk or Stair Free Church ===
The Schaw or Shaw Kirk is now ruinous (2011) having been built in 1843-4 close to the Shaw Burn on the parish boundary and abandoned in 1956 when a new church was built in Drongan following the demolition of the miners' rows and the transfer of the inhabitants to Drongan. It was expanded in the 1890s with an attractive wooden porch added and a new wing built o the east making it cross shaped. Two associated buildings stood to the north where the entrance to the nearby business now runs. Its final use was as a store for a local farm. The manse still stands as a private house on the road running up to Trabboch Burn.

== Micro-history ==
An SS Trabboch was sunk in 1914 by the German Light Cruiser Emden in the Indian Ocean.
