= Freddie Williams (businessman) =

Scottish bookmaker and businessman (1942–2008)

Freddie "Fearless" Sidney Williams (28 October 1942 – 21 June 2008) was a Scottish businessman, gambler and bookmaker. Born in the Ayrshire mining village of Cumnock, he was spared a career as a miner due to ill health at the age of 15 and went on to work for local soft drinks company Currie's of Auchinleck. Following a successful management buyout, and subsequent sale, Williams became a millionaire.

It was at Currie's that he first took to gambling. For years he was a boomaker's-runner, before taking up his first bookmaking pitch at Auchinleck Greyhound Stadium.

In 1974 Williams bought his first horseracing bookmaking pitch at Ayr Racecourse. He subsequently went on to purchase pitches, including Irvine Racecourse, Hamilton Park Racecourse, Musselburgh Racecourse, Perth Racecourse and Cheltenham Racecourse. He also owned a pitch at Shawfield Stadium in Glasgow. At the time of his death, Williams owned a total of 11 pitches.

As business grew, Freddie Williams Bookmakers expanded to a chain of seven bookmaking shops. As of June 2008, this had been slimmed down to two, one in either of his hometowns, Cumnock and Auchinleck.

== Business interests ==
Williams' interests in the soft drinks market continued following the termination of his interests in Currie's. In 1992 he set up Caledonian Bottlers in Netherthird, Cumnock. A successful operation, Caledonian bottle premium branded drinks such as Smirnoff Ice. At one time Williams also operated Caledonian Clear, his own premium bottled water brand from the same factory. In April 2002, the Sunday Mail reported Williams as being a “boss from hell”. Following his death, Williams' 50,000 shares in the bottling operation were valued at over £4.5 million.

He was the owner of 76 St Vincent Street, an Italian restaurant in Glasgow. He originally bought the restaurant in 2004 to deter his daughters from joining him in the betting industry. The business was not to be successful and was eventually liquidated.

== Ill health ==
In 1998 Williams suffered a massive heart attack and later underwent a triple-heart bypass.

== Cheltenham ==
Williams first put his name down for a bookmaking pitch at Cheltenham Racecourse in 1976 but he was unable to purchase a pitch until a relaxation of regulations governing ownership of on-site bookmakers pitches in 1998. Williams paid £90,000 for pitch number 2 at auction, the first ever sale of a pitch at Cheltenham and only four weeks after his triple-heart-bypass.

Williams shot to fame in March 2000, taking mammoth bets from JP McManus amongst others at the Cheltenham Festival. Williams laid short favourites Shannon Gale and Nick Dundee, owned by John Magnier, close friends of JP McManus. Williams laid one punter £80,000 on Nick Dundee at 11/8 and without budging, immediately took another £80,000 from the same punter. Williams stood to lose £220,000. Nick Dundee fell at the third-last fence. Channel 4's John McCririck subsequently nicknamed Williams, “Fearless Freddie”.

Williams went on take several high-profile bets from JP McManus, several of which were in the public domain.

On Thursday 16 March 2006, Williams laid McManus £100,000 on Reveillez at 7–1 in the first race of the Festival. It won. In the final race of the day McManus placed £5,000 each-way on 50-1 outsider Kadoun, which also won. Williams lost over £1,000,000 to McManus that day – and all whilst filming a documentary for ITV.

That night, Williams and daughter Julie were subject to an armed robbery as they travelled back to their hotel from Cheltenham. The robbers fled with an estimated £70,000. Williams returned to Cheltenham the following year.

In March 2008 he returned to the Festival accompanied by his own horse Donaldson. A rising public profile saw Williams undertake the writing of a Festival column for the Daily Record.

== Family ==
In 1966 Williams married Sheila, but they separated around 1997–1998. Freddie and Sheila had two daughters, Elizabeth "Julie" and Shirley. In March 2006, Freddie and Sheila divorced for a reputed £1,000,000 settlement. Sheila also got to keep the modest family home in Holmhead, Cumnock.

Williams spent the later years of his life in a relationship with long-term partner Margaret Gribben, but the pair never married, and his £8 million estate passed on to his two daughters.

Since his death, Williams' daughter Julie has taken on the running of the bookmakers business.

== Death ==
On 21 June 2008, Freddie Willams died having suffered a major heart attack at his home in Skares, near Cumnock. Typical of Williams' working attitude, his death followed a hectic start to the weekend which saw him take a helicopter from Musselburgh Racecourse to Ayr Racecourse the previous day (Friday) in order to attend both race meetings.

On the day of his death he had pitched up at Ayr Racecourse for what was to be the final time, before going on to Shawfield in the evening. Williams died shortly after his return home that night.
