= List of listed buildings in Cumnock And Holmhead, East Ayrshire =

This is a list of listed buildings in the parish of Cumnock and Holmhead, in East Ayrshire, Scotland.

== List ==
Name	Location	Date Listed	Grid Ref. (Note: Sometimes known as OSGB36, the grid reference (where provided) is based on the British national grid reference system used by the Ordnance Survey. • "Guide to National Grid". Ordnance Survey. • "Get-a-map". Ordnance Survey.)	Geo-coordinates	Notes	LB Number (Note: Historic Environment Scotland assign a unique alphanumeric identifier to each designated site in Scotland, for listed buildings this always begins with "LB", for example "LB12345".)	Image
Old Cumnock Old Church				55°27′15″N 4°15′58″W	Category B	24092	Upload another image
The Snug Bar The Square				55°27′16″N 4°15′59″W	Category C(S)	24103	Upload Photo
The Royal Hotel 44, 45, 46 The Square				55°27′16″N 4°15′56″W	Category C(S)	24107	Upload Photo
The Craighead Inn				55°27′15″N 4°15′54″W	Category C(S)	24108	Upload Photo
No 15 Glaisnock Street				55°27′16″N 4°15′53″W	Category C(S)	24113	Upload Photo
No 18 Glaisnock Street				55°27′13″N 4°15′54″W	Category C(S)	24116	Upload Photo
Congregational Church And Manse Auchinleck Road				55°27′20″N 4°16′07″W	Category C(S)	24130	Upload Photo
Bank (Or Templand) Railway Viaduct Over Lugar Water In Woodroad Park				55°27′31″N 4°15′24″W	Category A	24133	Upload another image See more images
No 22 The Square				55°27′15″N 4°15′59″W	Category B	24101	Upload Photo
Cumnock, 65 And 67 Glaisnock Street, Royal Bank Of Scotland				55°27′12″N 4°15′51″W	Category B	24111	Upload Photo
Crichton Church Of Scotland Ayr Road				55°27′11″N 4°15′57″W	Category B	24123	Upload Photo
Nos 1, 2 The Square				55°27′14″N 4°15′56″W	Category C(S)	24094	Upload Photo
The Mercat Hotel, Formerly The Black Bull Hotel, The Square				55°27′16″N 4°15′56″W	Category B	24106	Upload Photo
Cumnock, Glaisnock Street, Dumfries Arms Hotel				55°27′10″N 4°15′50″W	Category B	24112	Upload Photo
No 17 Glaisnock Street				55°27′15″N 4°15′54″W	Category C(S)	24114	Upload Photo
Nos 12-16 Glaisnock Street				55°27′14″N 4°15′54″W	Category C(S)	24115	Upload Photo
Cumnock, 21 Ayr Road, Including Gatepiers And Boundary Wall				55°27′08″N 4°15′57″W	Category B	24121	Upload Photo
Strathcylde Regional Supplies Department (Former United Session Church), Tanyard				55°27′10″N 4°16′02″W	Category C(S)	24125	Upload Photo
Former Railway Viaduct Now Footbridge, Murray Park				55°26′55″N 4°15′24″W	Category B	24134	Upload Photo
Nos 18, 19, 20 The Square				55°27′14″N 4°15′59″W	Category C(S)	24099	Upload Photo
No 38 The Square				55°27′17″N 4°15′57″W	Category C(S)	24105	Upload Photo
Town Hall, Glaisnock Street				55°27′08″N 4°15′50″W	Category C(S)	24119	Upload another image
Nos 38-42 Ayr Road				55°27′11″N 4°15′55″W	Category B	24122	Upload Photo
Lugar (Or Stepends) Bridge Over Lugar Water				55°27′18″N 4°16′04″W	Category B	24129	Upload Photo
Mercat Cross, The Square				55°27′14″N 4°15′58″W	Category A	24093	Upload another image See more images
The Sun Inn, The Square				55°27′15″N 4°15′59″W	Category B	24102	Upload Photo
Cumnock, 61 And 63 Glaisnock Street				55°27′12″N 4°15′50″W	Category B	24110	Upload Photo
No 20 24 Glaisnock Street				55°27′13″N 4°15′54″W	Category C(S)	24117	Upload Photo
Nos 1-3 Ayr Road				55°27′12″N 4°15′52″W	Category C(S)	24118	Upload Photo
Broomfield, Auchinleck Road				55°27′17″N 4°16′25″W	Category B	24131	Upload Photo
Nos 9, 10, 11 The Square				55°27′14″N 4°15′58″W	Category C(S)	24098	Upload Photo
No 21 The Square				55°27′15″N 4°15′59″W	Category C(S)	24100	Upload Photo
The Clydesdale Bank The Square				55°27′16″N 4°15′58″W	Category B	24104	Upload Photo
Strathclyde Regional Council Area Office, Off Lugar Street				55°27′20″N 4°15′58″W	Category C(S)	24126	Upload Photo
Nos 3, 4 5 The Square Gospel Hall				55°27′14″N 4°15′57″W	Category B	24095	Upload Photo
No 6 The Square				55°27′14″N 4°15′57″W	Category B	24096	Upload Photo
St John's R.C. Church Glaisnock Street				55°26′58″N 4°15′41″W	Category B	24120	Upload Photo
Graveyard Barrhill Road				55°27′20″N 4°15′45″W	Category C(S)	24132	Upload Photo
3 Lugar Street, The Baird Institute				55°27′16″N 4°16′01″W	Category C(S)	50889	Upload Photo
No 7, 8 The Square				55°27′14″N 4°15′58″W	Category B	24097	Upload Photo
Cumnock, 55 And 57 Glaisnock Street				55°27′13″N 4°15′51″W	Category C(S)	24109	Upload Photo
Riverside, Lugar Street				55°27′18″N 4°16′02″W	Category C(S)	24128	Upload Photo
Auchinleck Road Lochnorris				55°27′18″N 4°16′21″W	Category B	24135	Upload Photo

== Key ==
The scheme for classifying buildings in Scotland is:

- Category A: "buildings of national or international importance, either architectural or historic; or fine, little-altered examples of some particular period, style or building type."
- Category B: "buildings of regional or more than local importance; or major examples of some particular period, style or building type, which may have been altered."
- Category C: "buildings of local importance; lesser examples of any period, style, or building type, as originally constructed or moderately altered; and simple traditional buildings which group well with other listed buildings."

In March 2016 there were 47,288 listed buildings in Scotland. Of these, 8% were Category A, and 50% were Category B, with the remaining 42% being Category C.

== See also ==
- List of listed buildings in East Ayrshire
