= Auchinleck Greyhound Stadium =

Greyhound racing venue in Auchinleck, Scotland

- Interactive map of Auchinleck Greyhound Stadium
- Location: Pennylands Road, Auchinleck, East Ayrshire
- Coordinates: 55°28′17.2″N 4°18′08.2″W

Construction
- Opened: 1930?
- Closed: 2003

Auchinleck Greyhound Stadium was a greyhound racing stadium in East Ayrshire.

== History ==
The greyhound stadium in Auchinleck was located south of Mauchline Road and north of Barony Road in Auchinleck, East of Ayr. The track built in the 1950's was a popular independent (unlicensed) track for over 40 years and had a 365-yard circumference and a 100 yards run to the first bend with the main distances being 264, 410 and 610 yards. The major race was the Autumn Auchinleck Derby and the track was the birthplace of famous Scottish bookmaker Fearless Freddie Williams who had his first pitch there.

== Closure ==
The last race meeting was on 15th October 2000 according to the Greyhound Star magazine, the stadium closed in 2003 and was sold for redevelopment in 2006.
