= Auchinleck =

Village in East Ayrshire, Scotland

Coordinates: 55.473349°N 4.298517°W

Auchinleck: Scottish Gaelic: Achadh nan Leac; Scots: Affleck
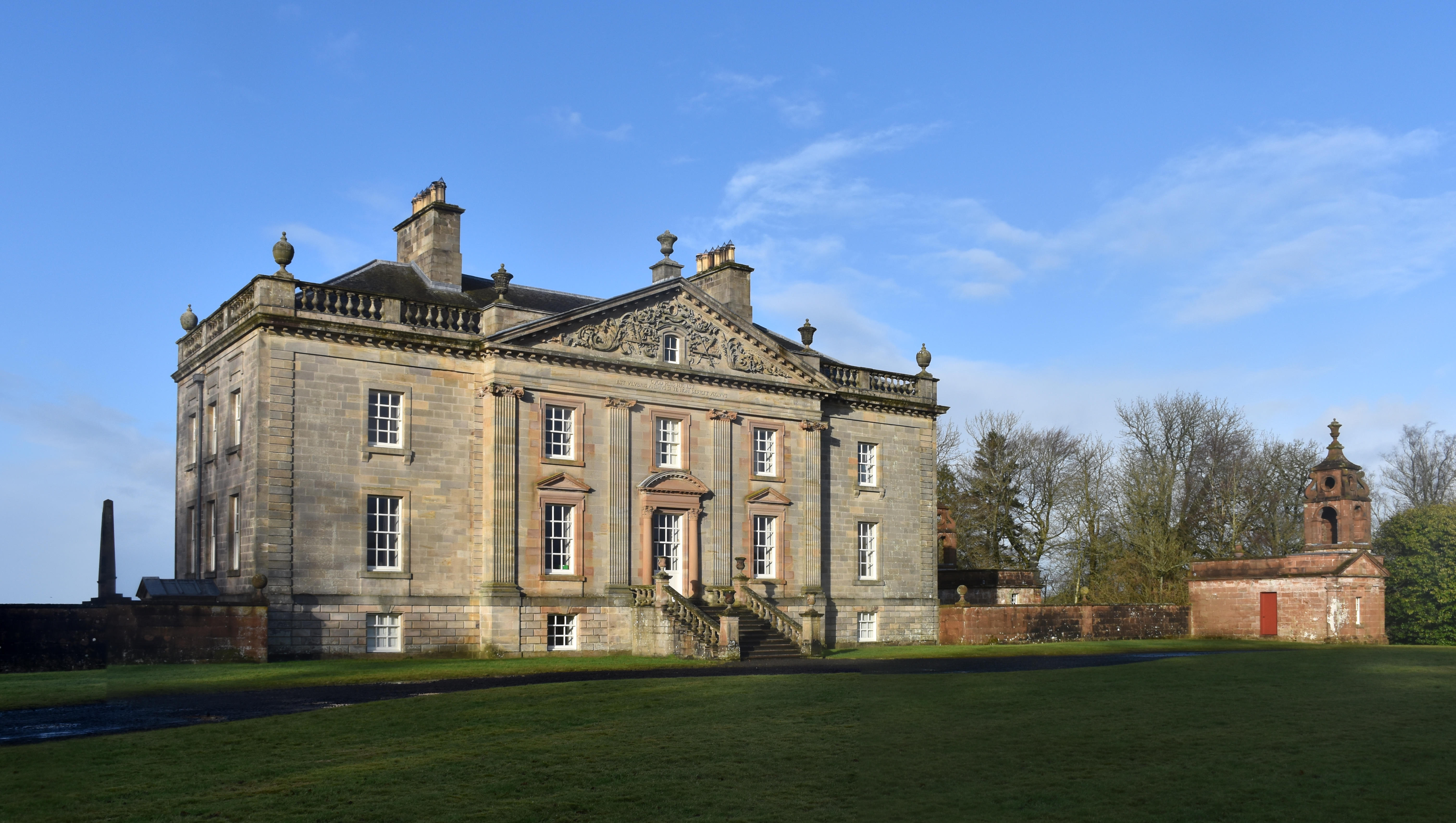
- Auchinleck House

- Location within East Ayrshire
- Population: 3,630 (2020)
- OS grid reference: NS548223
- Council area: East Ayrshire
- Lieutenancy area: Ayrshire
- Country: Scotland
- Sovereign state: United Kingdom
- Post town: CUMNOCK
- Postcode district: KA18
- Dialling code: 01290
- Police: Scotland
- Fire: Scottish
- Ambulance: Scottish
- UK Parliament: Kilmarnock and Loudoun
- Scottish Parliament: Carrick, Cumnock and Doon Valley

Auchinleck (/ˈæflɛk/ AF-lek; Scots: Affleck [ˈaflɛk]; Scottish Gaelic: Achadh nan Leac) is a village 5 miles (8 km) southeast of Mauchline, and 2 miles (3 km) northwest of Cumnock in East Ayrshire, Scotland.

Surrounding the village is Auchinleck Estate, centred on Auchinleck House, past home of the lawyer, diarist and biographer James Boswell, 9th Laird of Auchinleck.

== History ==
Auchinleck is in the heart of the ancient Kyle district of Scotland. The place-name means "field of (flat) stones" in Scottish Gaelic, from achadh ('field') and leac ('slab'). The small locality of Auchincloich has a comparable meaning.

Although record of a community exists from as early as 1239, reliable records can really only be said to date from the arrival of the Boswell family in 1504. The barony of Auchinleck had been forfeited to the crown and was granted by King James IV to his "good and faithful servant" Thomas Boswell.

The Boswells proved to be assiduous in their estate husbandry, and by the early 1700s a viable village community and a thriving estate had begun to emerge from the surrounding barren moorland. The New Statistical Account of 1837 documents early mining and quarrying in the area which was to become the impetus for the region to boom. By 1881 the parish population had blossomed and was 6,681, four times what it had been in 1831

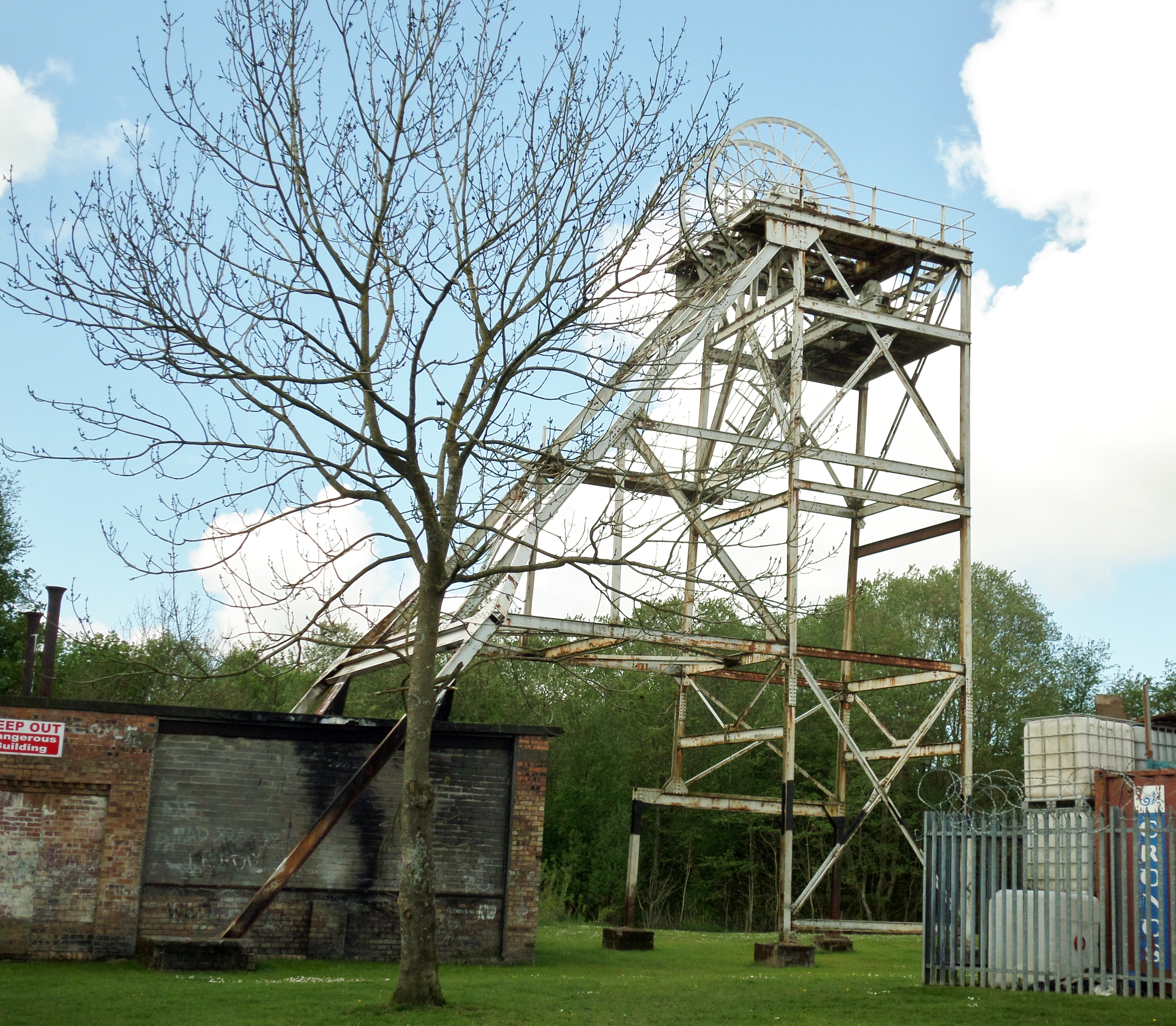
Disused winding gear at the former Highhouse Colliery on the outskirts of the village

Nationalisation of coal in 1947 brought investment and with the building of the Barony Power Station, which was commissioned in 1957, the future of the region seemed assured. However, within 30 years the fortunes of the area, so tied to coal, followed the spectacular demise of deep pit mining. Lacking an economic source of fuel as mines closed, the power station shut down in 1989, High House pits closed in 1983, and Auchinleck village subsided into post-industrial recession. However, with the recent acquisition and subsequent development of Dumfries House in the area by Prince Charles, Duke of Rothesay, and with new building taking place in the area there are signs of 'green shoots'.

== Sport ==
The village is home to the junior football club Auchinleck Talbot, who play at the 4,000-capacity Beechwood Park. The 'Bot is one of the most successful clubs in Scotland at their level. They share a fierce rivalry with near neighbours Cumnock Juniors in the West of Scotland Premier Division, the sixth tier of Scottish football.

== Education ==
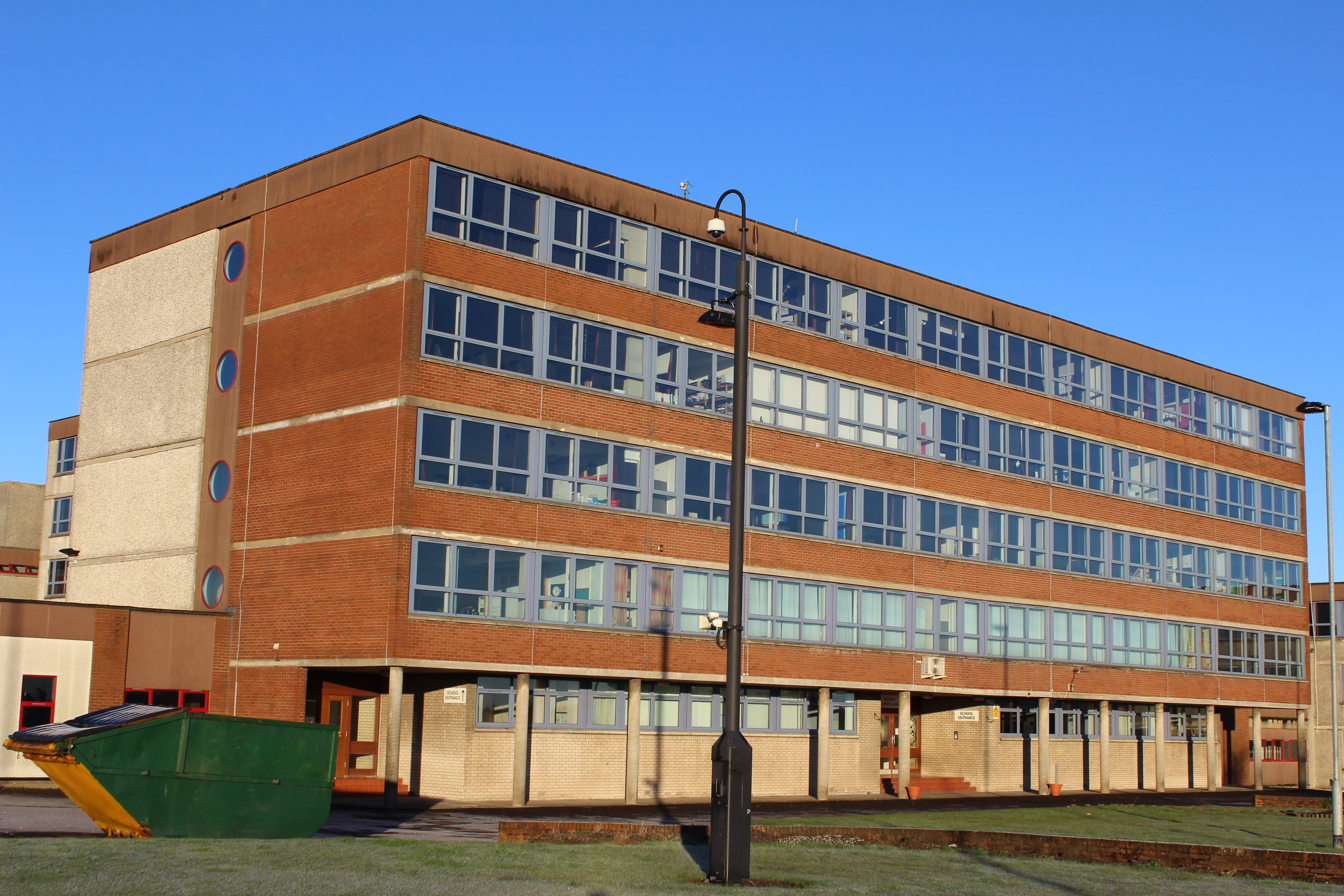
Auchinleck Academy which closed in 2020 following a merger with Cumnock Academy to establish the new Robert Burns Academy in Cumnock

Auchinleck has two primary schools, namely Auchinleck Primary School and St Patrick's Primary School. The town's secondary school, Auchinleck Academy, closed in late 2020, with pupils moving to the new Robert Burns Academy. This is part of the Barony Campus in Cumnock which has incorporated a number of local schools and nurseries into one site.

== Notable people ==
- James Crystal: parish minister for over 50 years and Moderator of the General Assembly of the Church of Scotland 1879–80
- Kris Doolan: professional footballer for Partick Thistle in the Scottish Championship. Currently one of the club's record-breaking goalscorers. Previously played at local club Auchinleck Talbot.
- Alexander Boswell, Lord Auchinleck (1706–1782), judge and father of James Boswell.

== See also ==
- List of places in East Ayrshire
- List of listed buildings in Auchinleck, East Ayrshire
- Auchinleck railway station
- Medieval turf building in Cronberry
- Back Rogerton
- Wallace's Cave, Auchinleck
