= Back Rogerton =

Coordinates: 55.47°N 04.29°W

- Location within East Ayrshire
- OS grid reference: NS5522
- Council area: East Ayrshire
- Country: Scotland
- Sovereign state: United Kingdom
- Postcode district: KA18 2
- Dialling code: 01290
- Police: Scotland
- Fire: Scottish
- Ambulance: Scottish
- UK Parliament: Kilmarnock & Loudoun

Back Rogerton was built in the post-World War II housing boom. It is a part of Auchinleck, East Ayrshire, Scotland.

The area was bounded by the disused Rogerton Quarry, railway lines and Back Rogerton Farm. The creation of this was necessitated by the removal of many miners and their families from the substandard housing of smaller mining villages in the area.

Part of Well Road, Auchinleck follows the edge of the former site of Rogerton Quarry. The quarry itself is now a public park housing the MUGA (Multi-Use Games Area).
