= Cumnock Town Hall =

Municipal building in Cumnock, Scotland

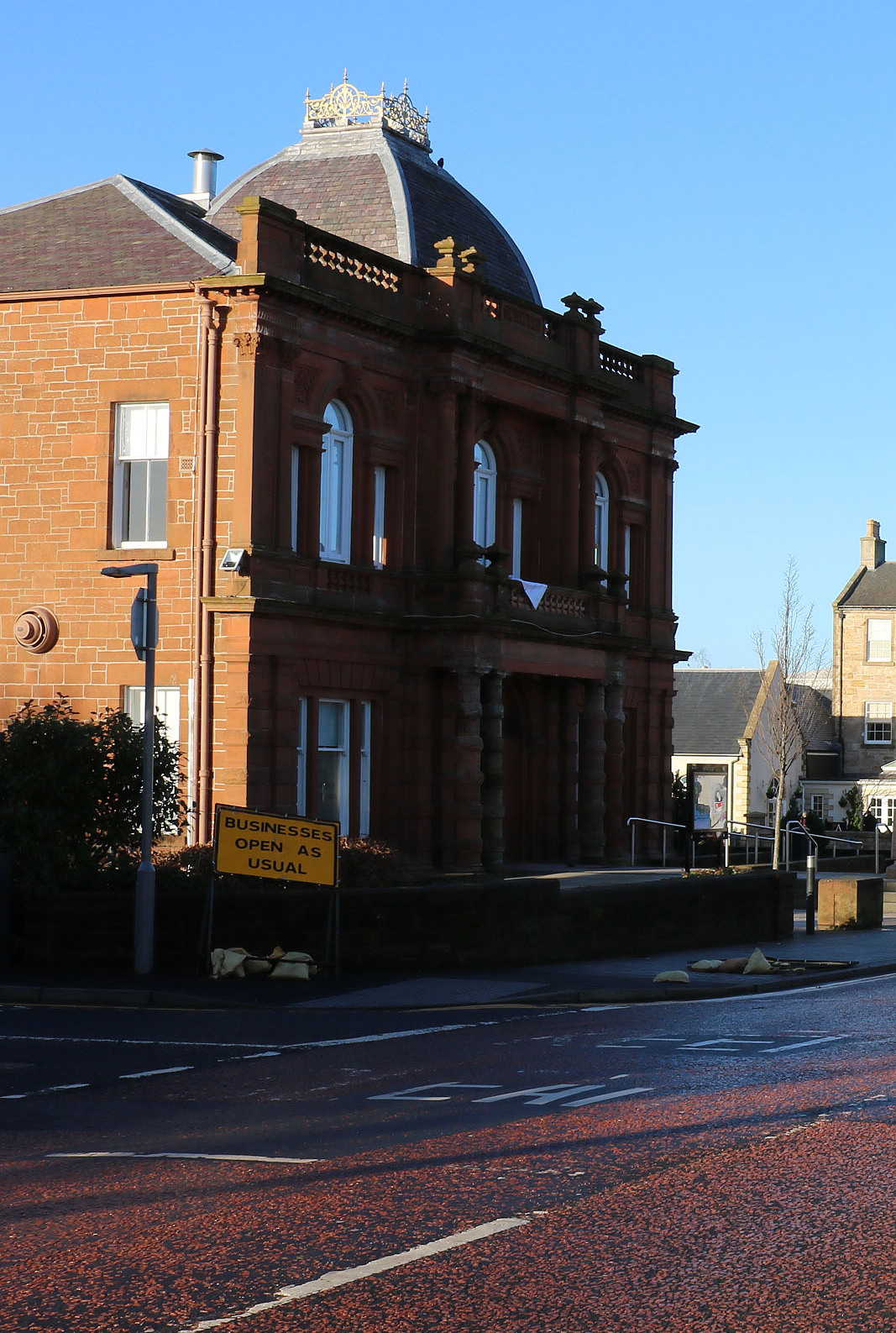
- Cumnock Town Hall

- Shown in East Ayrshire
- 55.4522°N 4.2636°W
- Location: Glaisnock Street, Cumnock

History
- Built: 1884

Site notes
- Architect: Robert Samson Ingram
- Architectural style: Renaissance Revival style

Listed Building – Category C(S)
- Official name: Town Hall, Glaisnock Street
- Designated: 18 August 1977
- Reference no.: LB24119

Cumnock Town Hall is a municipal building in Glaisnock Street, Cumnock, East Ayrshire, Scotland. The structure, which is used as a community events venue, is a Category C listed building.

== History ==
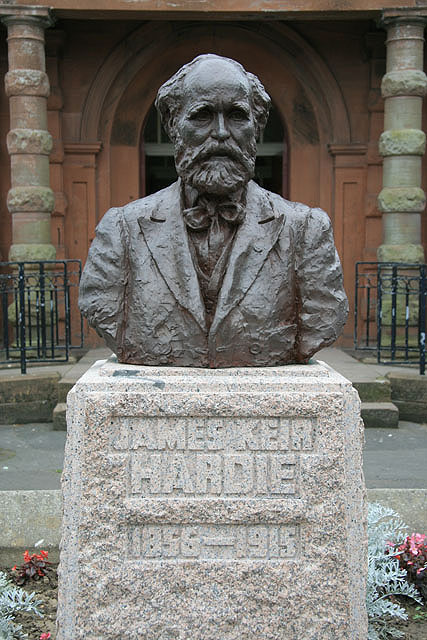
The bust of Keir Hardie

Following significant population growth, largely associated with the mining industry, the Cumnock and Holmhead area became a police burgh in 1866. In this context, in 1880, the provost, George Samson, launched a campaign to procure a town hall. The local landowner, John Crichton-Stuart, 3rd Marquess of Bute, whose seat was at Mount Stuart House, offered to donate the site and contribute £500 towards the cost of construction. The site chosen was vacant land on the west side of Glaisnock Street. The new building was designed by Robert Samson Ingram in the Renaissance Revival style, built in red ashlar stone from the Ballochmyle Quarry at a cost of £3,000 and was officially opened by the Marquess of Bute on 6 June 1885.

The design involved a symmetrical main frontage with three bays facing onto Glaisnock Street. The central bay, which slightly projected forward, featured a round headed doorway with a moulded surround flanked by pairs of banded Doric order columns supporting an entablature and a balustraded balcony; there was a Venetian-style doorway on the first floor flanked by pairs of Corinthian order columns supporting an entablature, a modillioned cornice and a balustraded parapet. The outer bays were fenestrated by tri-partite mullioned windows on the ground floor and by Venetian windows on the first floor. At roof level, there was a large central domed canopy. Internally, the principal room was the main assembly hall.

Repairs were undertaken after a major thunderstorm ignited a fire in the town hall on 9 July 1893. A bust of the former Leader of the Labour Party, Keir Hardie, who had lived in the town, was sculpted by Benno Schotz and unveiled outside the town hall by Nan Hardie in August 1939.

The building continued to serve as the offices and meeting place of the burgh council for much of the 20th century, but ceased to be the local seat of government when the enlarged Cumnock and Doon Valley District Council was formed at the council offices in Lugar in 1975. However, the building subsequently continued to serve in its traditional role as a community events venue hosting concerts and theatre performances. A public meeting to protest about the imminent introduction of the poll tax was held at the town hall in April 1988.

A major refurbishment programme, which involved extensive repairs to the masonry and cost £850,000, was completed in May 2014. The programme was financed by Historic Scotland and East Ayrshire Council, carried out to a design by the council architect's department supported by Wylie Shanks Architects, and undertaken by Clark Contracts. A statue, in the form of a floral tribute encircled in steel which was intended to commemorate the Platinum Jubilee of Elizabeth II, was unveiled outside the town hall in May 2022.

== See also ==
- List of listed buildings in Cumnock And Holmhead, East Ayrshire
