= Cumnock Academy =

Coordinates: 55.453°N 4.274°W

Location
- Ayr Road; Cumnock, East Ayrshire, KA18 1EH; Scotland

Information
- Type: State funded secondary school
- Closed: 28 October 2020
- Local authority: East Ayrshire Council
- Executive Head Teacher: Peter Gilchrist
- Gender: Male and female pupils
- Age: 12 to 18
- Enrolment: 881 (in August 2011)
- Website: http://www.cumnock.e-ayr.sch.uk/index.html

Cumnock Academy was a secondary school in Cumnock, East Ayrshire, Scotland.

Notable former pupils include Iona McDonald, Lord Lieutenant of Ayrshire and Arran since 2017; Bill Grant, MP for Ayr, Carrick and Cumnock;, Eric Caldow, a former Scottish international footballer., and Cameron Harrison, head of the Scottish Consultative Council on the Curriculum and CEO of George Soros' Open Society Foundations.

Cumnock Academy closed in October 2020 following a merger with nearby Auckinleck Academy to form the new Robert Burns Academy in Cumnock.
