= Iona McDonald =

Scottish sheriff (born 1954)

Iona McDonald OBE

Lord Lieutenant of Ayrshire and Arran
- Incumbent
- Assumed office 26 October 2017
- Monarchs: Elizabeth II; Charles III
- Deputy: John Dalrymple Hamilton
- Preceded by: John Lawrence Duncan

Personal details
- Born: Iona Sara Macintyre McDonald; November 18, 1954 (age 71) Ayrshire, Scotland
- Education: Cumnock Academy
- Alma mater: University of Glasgow
- Occupation: Sheriff, solicitor
- Profession: Sheriff and solicitor within Scots law

Iona Sara Macintyre McDonald OBE (born 18 November 1954) is a Scottish sheriff who was appointed as a temporary Sheriff in 1994 before receiving a full appointment in 2000 to the Sheriffdom of North Strathclyde, sitting in both the Paisley and Kilmarnock Sheriff courts. Since 2007, she has been Senior Sheriff at Kilmarnock and has served as the Lord Lieutenant of Ayrshire and Arran since 2017.

McDonald was educated at Cumnock Academy and graduated from Glasgow University with a Master of Arts in 1976 and a law degree in 1978. She is a solicitor, and previously worked for the Ayr firm Mathie-Morton, Black and Buchanan, where she became partner in 1982. She was appointed as a temporary sheriff in 1994, was the sheriff of North Strathclyde from 2000 to 2007; and senior sheriff of Kilmarnock since then. She was appointed Officer of the Order of the British Empire (OBE) for services to law and order in the Queen's Birthday Honours' List 2019.

Honorary titles
Preceded by John Lawrence Duncan	Lord Lieutenant of Ayrshire and Arran; 2017–present	Incumbent
