= Church of St John, Cumnock (Ayrshire, Scotland) =

Coordinates: 55.44939°N 4.26135°W

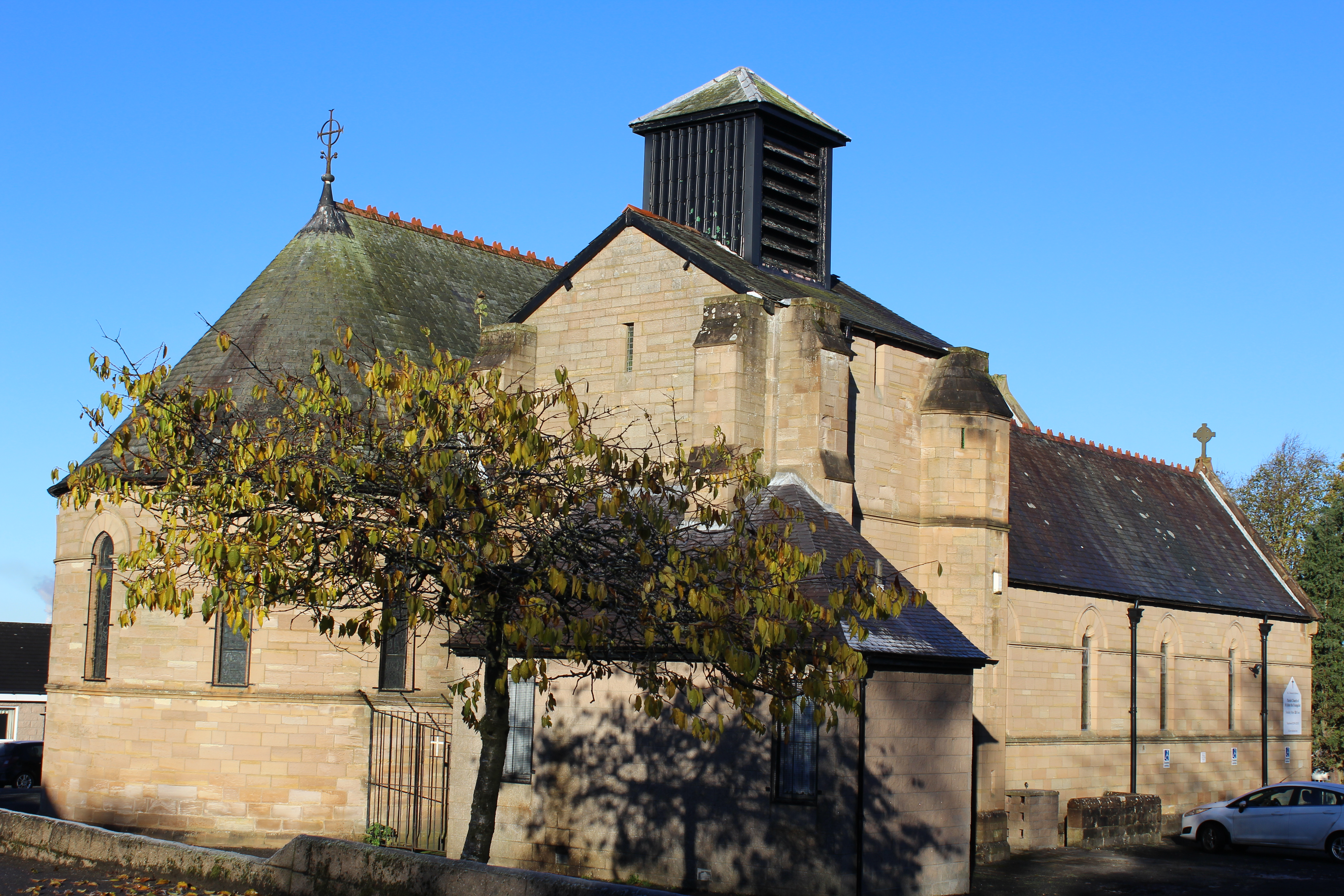
- Church of St John, Cumnock
- Location: Cumnock, Ayrshire
- Country: Scotland
- Denomination: Roman Catholic

History
- Founded: 1878
- Dedicated: 1880

Architecture
- Functional status: Active
- Heritage designation: Category B
- Architect: William Burges
- Architectural type: Church

Clergy
- Priest: Fr Philip Kitchen

The Church of St John the Evangelist is in the Scottish town of Cumnock, Ayrshire. Designed by William Burges for the 3rd Marquess of Bute, it was constructed between 1878 and 1880.

== Architecture and fittings ==
The church is constructed in the Early Decorated style and follows the plan of Burges's Church of All Saints, Murston in Kent. The nave is of four bays and ends in an unfinished tower.

== History ==
The church has some significance as the first ecclesiastical building in Scotland to be lit by electricity. The Scottish composer James MacMillan played the organ at the church as a young man.

== Bibliography ==
- Close, Rob; Riches, Anne (2012). Ayrshire and Arran. The Buildings of Scotland. Newhaven and London: Yale University Press. ISBN 9780300141702.
