= Doon Academy =

Location
- Ayr Road; Dalmellington, KA6 7SJ; Scotland; 55.32518°N 4.401913°W

Information
- Type: Non Denominational Secondary School
- Local authority: East Ayrshire Council
- Head Teacher: Kenneth Reilly
- Age: 11 to 18
- Enrolment: 260
- Houses: Doon, Raecar, Bradan, Finlas
- Colour
- School Years: S1-S6
- Website: Website

Doon Academy is a secondary school in Dalmellington that caters to the local surrounding areas Dalmellington, Patna, Rankinston and Bellsbank. The current head teacher is Kenneth Reilly who took over from John Mackenzie in 2014.

Doon Academy’s Motto is Respectful, Resilient, Ready.

== Overview ==
In 2019, 77% of Doon Academy pupils attained qualifications in literacy and numeracy at SCQF Level 4, while 46% attained Level 5. In 2019, 89% of pupils leaving Doon Academy were reported to be in a "positive destination" following their secondary education. In the five years previous to 2019, the figure for positive destinations for Doon Academy had remained above 85%.

== Associated Primary Schools ==
The school serves five local primary schools within the area – Bellsbank Primary School, Dalmellington Primary School, Littlemill Primary School, Patna Primary School and St. Xaviers Primary School. Children from other schools may be able to attend Doon Academy on approval of a placing request.
