= Logan, East Ayrshire =

Coordinates: 55°27′30.21″N 4°13′56.96″W

Logan
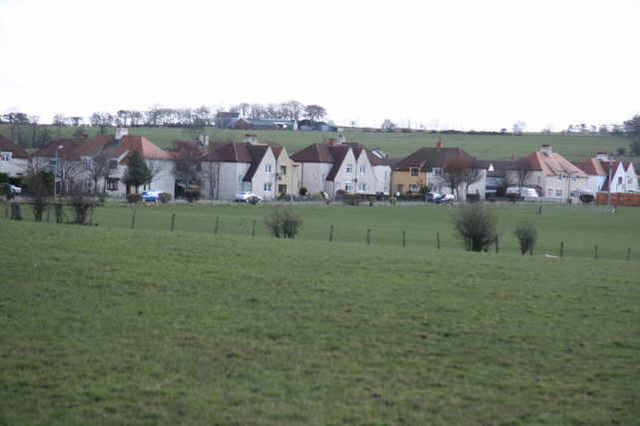

- Location within East Ayrshire
- Population: 1,190 (2020)
- Council area: East Ayrshire
- Country: Scotland
- Sovereign state: United Kingdom
- Post town: CUMNOCK
- Postcode district: 18
- Dialling code: 01290 42xxxx
- Police: Scotland
- Fire: Scottish
- Ambulance: Scottish
- UK Parliament: Ayr, Carrick and Cumnock
- Scottish Parliament: Carrick, Cumnock and Doon Valley

Logan (Scottish Gaelic: An Lagan) is a village in East Ayrshire, southwest Scotland. It is 1 mile (1.6 km) east of Cumnock, by the Lugar Water.

Logan is served by a regular daytime bus service (#49A) to Cumnock operated by Shuttle buses Ltd of Kilwinning. The nearest train station is Auchinleck.

The village provides little industry and mostly serves as a dormitory village for Cumnock and surrounds. The Ayr to Cronberry railway line would have passed behind the village before its closure in the 1960s. The track bed now serves as a popular footpath.
