= Netherthird =

Village in East Ayrshire, Scotland

Coordinates: 55.443°N 4.252°W

- Location within East Ayrshire
- Language: English; Scots
- Council area: East Ayrshire
- Lieutenancy area: Ayrshire and Arran
- Country: Scotland
- Sovereign state: United Kingdom
- Post town: CUMNOCK
- Police: Scotland
- Fire: Scottish
- Ambulance: Scottish

Netherthird is a small village to the south of Cumnock town centre in East Ayrshire, Scotland. It features a primary school, small grocery shops, bowling green and local community centre. The area of Netherthird, together with the areas of Skerrington and Craigens, forms the southernmost portion of Cumnock, the next closest town in the vicinity.
