= Kirklandside Hospital =

- NHS Ayrshire and Arran
- Shown in East Ayrshire

Geography
- Location: Hurlford, East Ayrshire, Scotland
- Coordinates: 55.5950°N 4.4735°W

Organisation
- Care system: NHS Scotland
- Type: care of the elderly

Services
- Beds: 25

History
- Founded: 1909
- Closed: 2018-2020

Links
- Website: www.nhsaaa.net/hospitals-and-health-centres/kirklandside-hospital.aspx
- Lists: Hospitals in Scotland

Kirklandside was a community hospital in the village of Hurlford a few miles out of Kilmarnock, Scotland. It was managed by NHS Ayrshire and Arran.

== History ==
The hospital was designed by James Scott Hay as an infectious diseases hospital and opened in 1910. The original lay-out consisted of seven blocks set on a 22-acre (9-hectare) site. When the hospital joined the National Health Service in 1948, it had 51 beds and was still classified as being for the care of infectious diseases. Closure was announced in 2018 and the buildings were demolished by early 2021.

== Services ==
The hospital provided consultant-led services for frail elderly patients. It had 25 long-stay beds for inpatient care and a day hospital which provided assessment and rehabilitation facilities.
