= Bellsbank =

Village in East Ayrshire, Scotland

Coordinates: 55.311802°N 4.396416°W

- Village
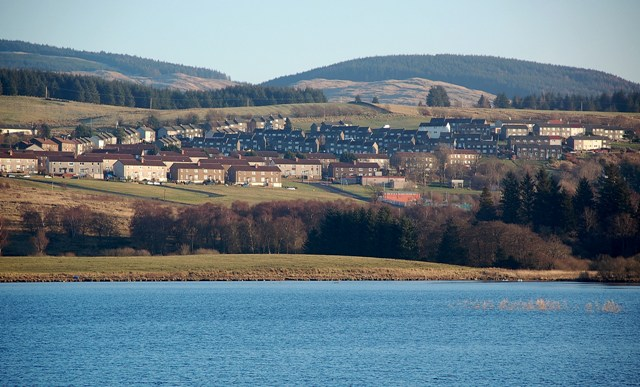
- Bellsbank View Bellsbank viewed from the south side of Bogton Loch.

- Location within East Ayrshire
- Population: 1,260 (2020)
- OS grid reference: NS480045
- Council area: East Ayrshire
- Country: Scotland
- Sovereign state: United Kingdom
- Postcode district: KA6 7xx
- Dialling code: 01292 55
- Police: Scotland
- Fire: Scottish
- Ambulance: Scottish
- UK Parliament: Ayr, Carrick and Cumnock
- Scottish Parliament: Carrick, Cumnock and Doon Valley

Bellsbank is a village half a mile away from the market town of Dalmellington in East Ayrshire, Scotland. It is the second-highest place in East Ayrshire; only Muirkirk is higher than this. Bellsbank is now classed as a separate town from Dalmellington.

== History ==
Bellsbank was originally established to provide housing for the population of Benquhat (one of several "ghost" villages in the Doon Valley that have been demolished).

Expanded between the wars to house miners from worked out areas that were relocated there. Laid out by the County Council the houses looked out over Bogton Loch, Craigengillan Estate and the Loch Doon Hills.

== Educational provision ==
Bellsbank welcomed a new primary school in February 2020, to replace the old school opened in 1955. The new school was built in the grounds of the old school and opened to pupils on 9 February 2020. The current head teacher is Fiona Greig.

== Awards and accolades ==
Bellsbank was the winner of the Scottish Civic Trust - My Place Award thanks to the partnership between East Ayrshire Council and community group CANI in the Community. Bellsbank has also gained media attention due to a scheme by East Ayrshire Council in partnership with CANI in the Community and the local Primary School in which houses were rendered in pastel colours to improve the look of the village following years of decline.
