= Lord Lieutenant of Ayrshire and Arran =

Ceremonial officer in Ayrshire and Arran, Scotland

This is a list of people who served as Lord Lieutenant of Ayrshire and Arran, Scotland.

The first Lord Lieutenant, Sir Bryce Knox, had previously been Lord Lieutenant of Ayrshire. By virtue of the Lord Lieutenants Order 1975 he became Lord Lieutenant for the districts of Cunninghame, Kilmarnock and Loudoun, Kyle and Carrick and Cumnock and Doon Valley in Strathclyde Region. By virtue of the Lord-Lieutenants (Scotland) Order 1996 the lieutenancy area was renamed as Ayrshire and Arran.

Years	Lord Lieutenant
1975–1991	Sir Bryce Muir Knox
1991–2006	Major Sir Richard Yates Henderson
2006–2017	John Lawrence Duncan
since 2017	Iona Sara McDonald
