= Robert Burns Academy =

The Robert Burns Academy
- School badge

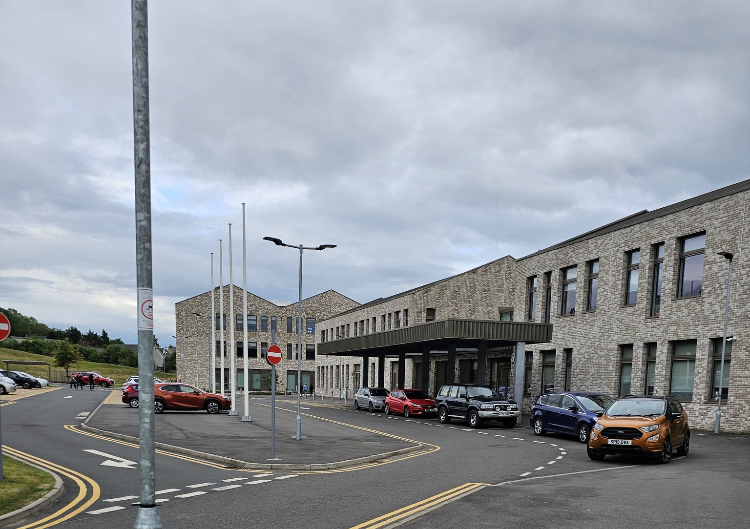
- Main entrance to Robert Burns Academy

Location
- Barony Campus, Auchinleck Road, Cumnock, East Ayrshire; Scotland; 55.45445°N 4.26644°W

Information
- Type: Co-educational, non-demonational secondary school
- Motto: Where we belong, where we reach our potential
- Religious affiliation: Non-demonational
- Established: 26 October 2020
- Authority: East Ayrshire Council
- Head teacher: Tracy Stewart
- Grades: S1–S6
- Gender: Boys and girls
- Age range: 11–18
- Enrollment: 1,665
- Language: English, Scots
- Website: Robert Burns Academy

The Robert Burns Academy is a secondary school located in Cumnock, East Ayrshire, Scotland, which opened to pupils in October 2020 following the merger of Cumnock Academy and Auchinleck Academy. The current Head Teacher, Tracy Stewart, also serves as the Head of Barony Campus, which includes Robert Burns Academy, Lochnorris Primary School, Cherry Trees Early Childhood Centre, and Hillside School.

Robert Burns Academy, as well as the overall Barony Campus, is the largest educational provision in Scotland.

== History ==
The proposal for the creation of a new £69 million new "super school" in the Cumnock area was announced in November 2014. The proposed closure of Auchinleck and Cumnock Academies, and the creation of a new school campus, involved consultation with the parents and carers of students at both schools. The opening of the new Barony Campus and Robert Burns Academy was delayed due to the COVID-19 outbreak resulting in construction work being halted at the site for a period. The school campus eventually opened to pupils in October 2020.

In 2025, pupils from Robert Burns Academy participated in the inaugural Young Musician Competition finals.

== Overview ==
=== Barony Campus ===
Robert Burns Academy is part of a 3-18 campus known as the Barony Campus. Within the campus are:

- Robert Burns Academy
- Lochnorris Primary School
- Cherry Trees Early Childhood Centre
- Hillside School

Each of the four educational establishments is led by its own Head Teacher, with Tracy Stewart serving as the overall Head of Campus, as well as Head Teacher of Robert Burns Academy.

=== Staffing ===
As one of the largest schools in Scotland in terms of pupil population, Robert Burns Academy has a large number of staff consisting of one Head Teacher (also Head of Campus), six Depute Head Teachers, one Head of Inclusion hub provision, nine Principal Teachers of Pupil Support, Class teachers across different educational departments and support, clerical and janitorial staff.

=== Performance ===
In 2022, Robert Burns Academy was ranked as the 288th best performing state school in Scotland, an increase from its 2021 ranking of 340th.

=== Associated primary schools ===
The current associated primary schools for Robert Burns Academy are Auchinleck Primary, Catrine Primary, Drongan Primary, Hillside Primary, Lochnorris Primary, Logan Primary, Mauchline Primary, Muirkirk Primary, Netherthird Primary, New Cumnock Primary, Ochiltree Primary and Sorn Primary.

== See also ==
- Lists of schools in Scotland
