= Ayrshire and Arran =

Lieutenancy area of Scotland

Coordinates: 55.445°N 4.975°W

Area of Ayrshire & Arran
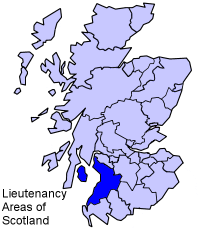

Ayrshire and Arran is a lieutenancy area of Scotland. It consists of the council areas of East Ayrshire, North Ayrshire and South Ayrshire. The area of Ayrshire and Arran is also a brand for tourist attractions.

The area has joint electoral, valuation and health boards. For electoral and valuation purposes, the same area is simply called Ayrshire.

== History ==
The lieutenancy area was created in 1975 when the historic county of Ayrshire was abolished for local government purposes. The last Lord Lieutenant of Ayrshire was made the first lord-lieutenant of a new lieutenancy area covering the four districts of Cumnock and Doon Valley, Cunninghame, Kilmarnock and Loudoun, and Kyle and Carrick. This area corresponded to the historic county of Ayrshire plus the Isle of Arran and The Cumbraes from Buteshire. The lieutenancy area was not given a separate name, with the lord-lieutenant being described as "Her Majesty's Lord-Lieutenant in Strathclyde Region (Districts of Cunninghame, Kilmarnock and Loudoun, Kyle and Carrick and Cumnock and Doon Valley)."

Further local government reform in 1996 saw the four districts within the lieutenancy area reorganised and renamed to become the three council areas of East Ayrshire, North Ayrshire, and South Ayrshire. The lieutenancy area remained unchanged, but was named "Ayrshire and Arran", with the post holder thereafter being called the Lord Lieutenant of Ayrshire and Arran.
