= Cumnock =

Coordinates: 55.45294°N 4.2638°W

Cumnock: Scottish Gaelic: Cumnag
- Town and former civil parish
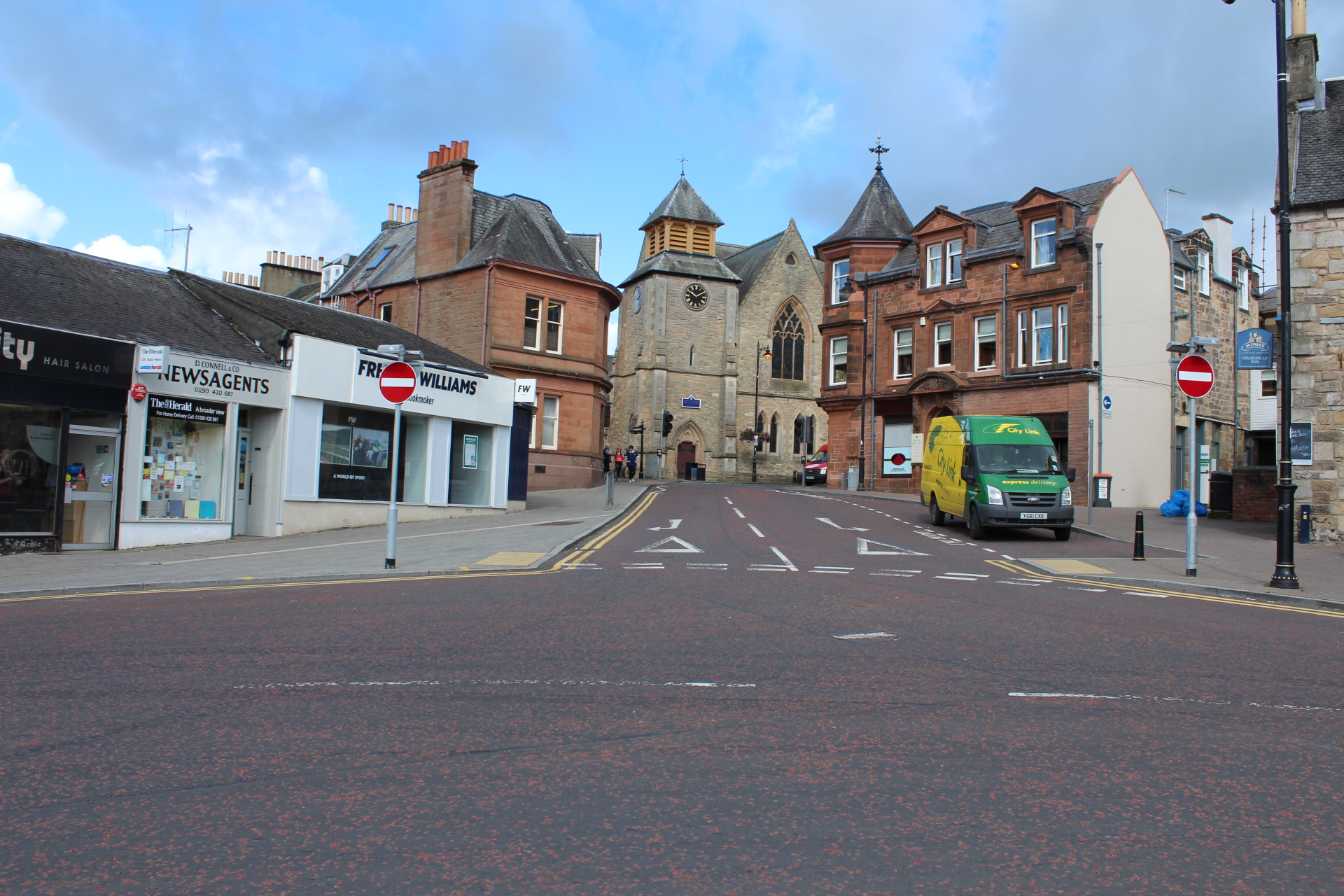
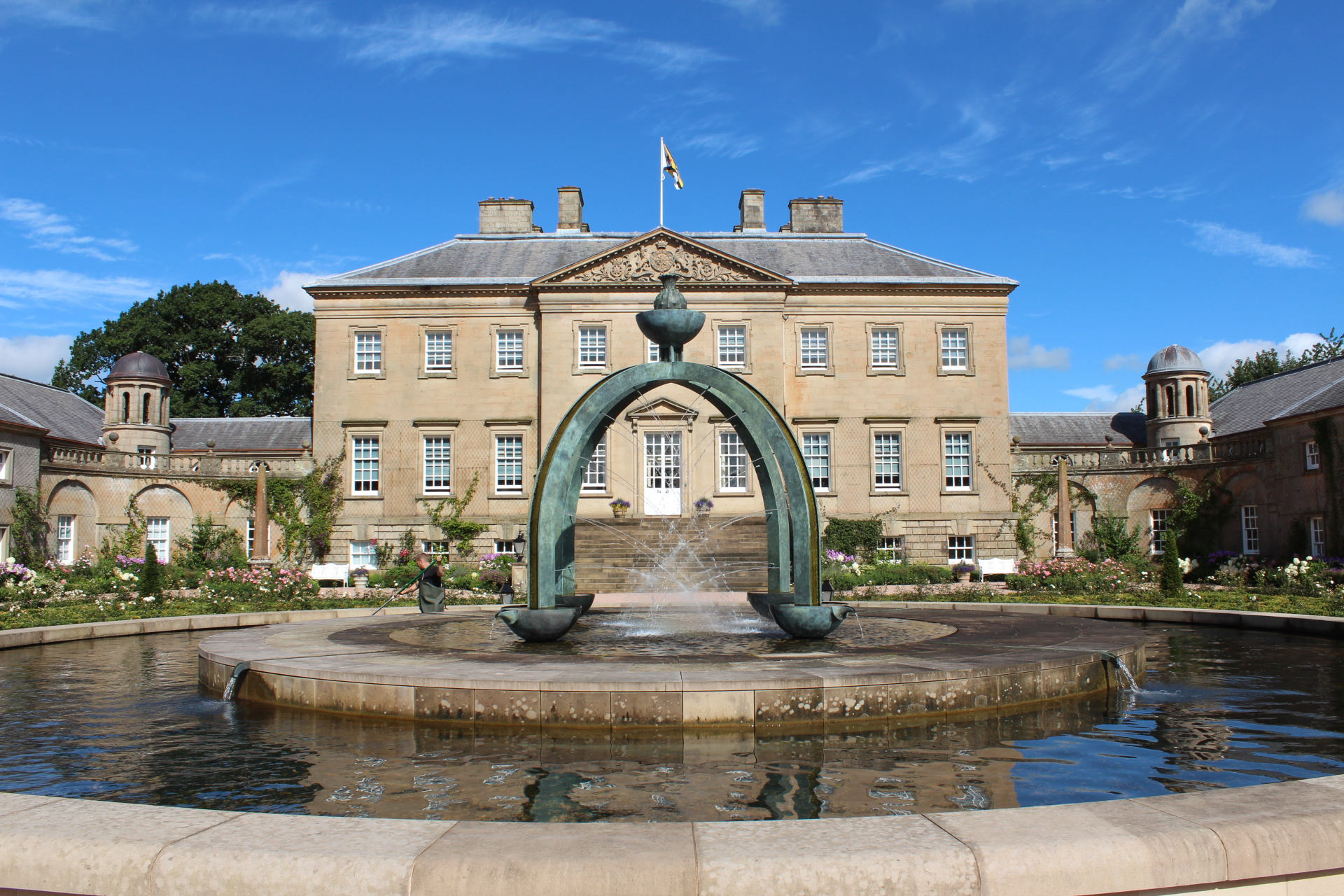
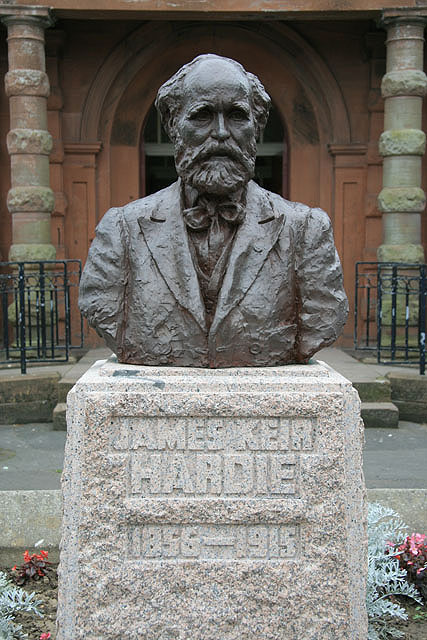
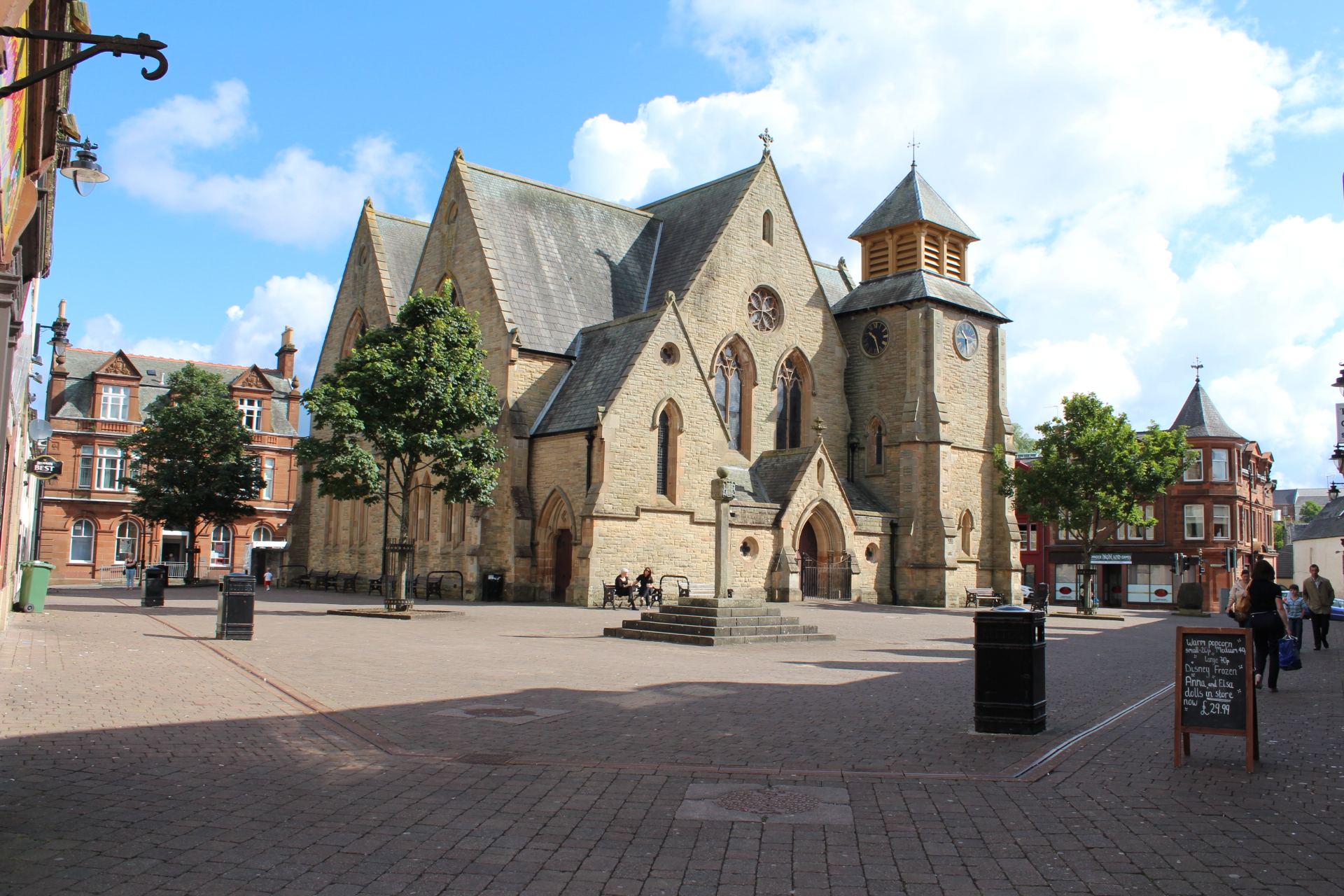
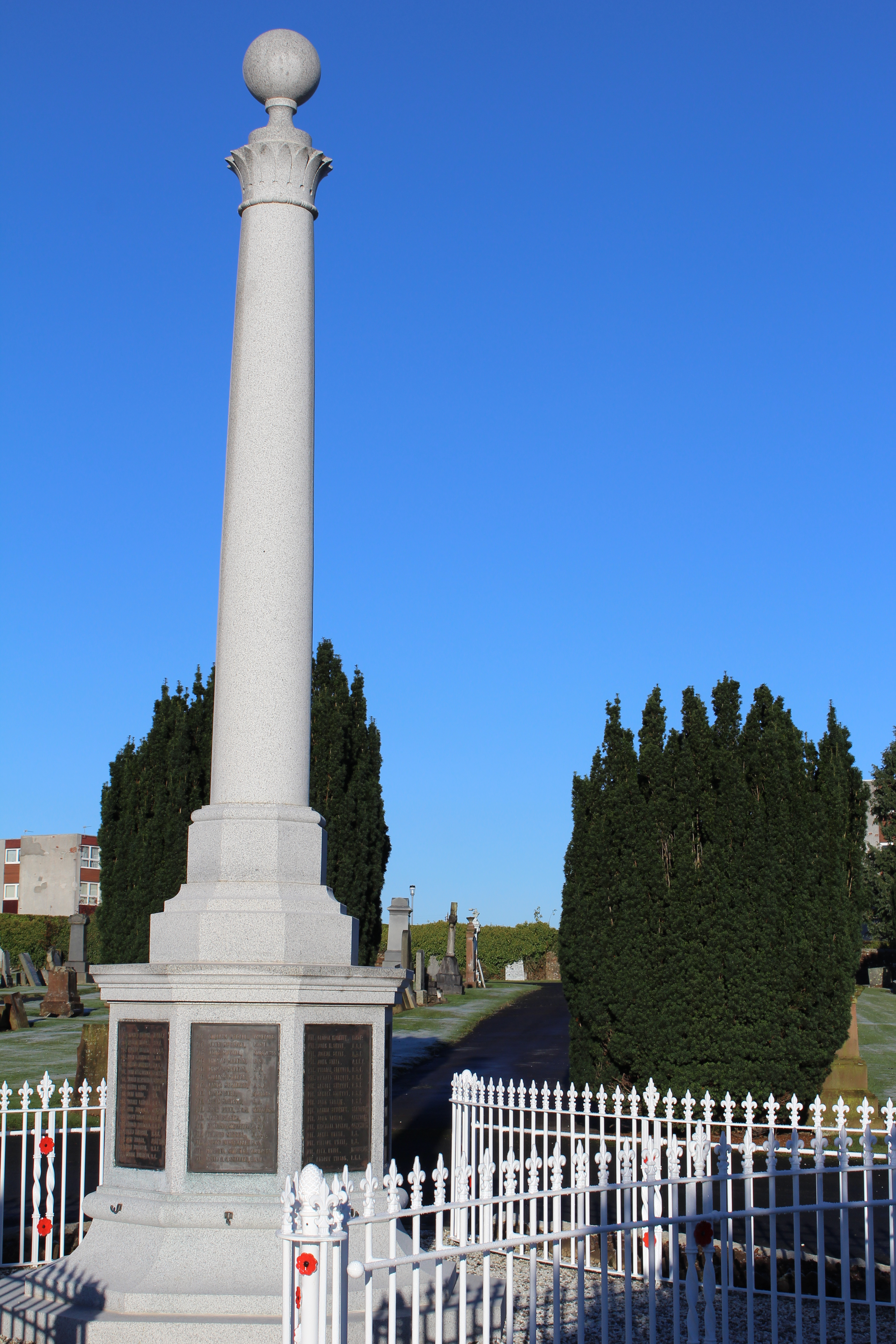
- From top, left to right: Cumnock Town Centre, Dumfries House, bust of James Keir Hardie at Cumnock Town Hall, the "Old Church", Cumnock town centre and the Cumnock War Memorial

- Location within East Ayrshire
- Population: 8,700 (2020)
- Language: English; Scots
- OS grid reference: NS569200
  - Edinburgh: 54 mi (87 km)
  - London: 321 mi (517 km)
- Council area: East Ayrshire
- Lieutenancy area: Ayrshire and Arran
- Country: Scotland
- Sovereign state: United Kingdom
- Post town: CUMNOCK
- Postcode district: KA18
- Dialling code: 01290
- Police: Scotland
- Fire: Scottish
- Ambulance: Scottish
- UK Parliament: Ayr, Carrick and Cumnock
- Scottish Parliament: Carrick, Cumnock and Doon Valley

Cumnock (Scottish Gaelic: Cumnag) is a town and former civil parish located in East Ayrshire, Scotland. The town sits at the confluence of the Glaisnock Water and the Lugar Water. There are three neighbouring housing estates which lie just outside the town boundaries, Craigens, Logan and Netherthird, with the former ironworks settlement of Lugar also just outside the town, contributing to a population of around 13,000 in the immediate locale. A new housing development, Knockroon, was granted planning permission on 9 December 2009 by East Ayrshire Council.

The 2011 UK Census revealed that the Ayr, Carrick and Cumnock constituency, of which Cumnock is part, had an above-average unemployment rate at 5.6% compared to the Scottish average of 4.8%, with a significant proportion of residents living in local authority housing at 20.2% compared to the Scottish average of 13.2%. The constituency also had a high proportion of retired people and Church of Scotland Protestants at the Census relative to elsewhere in Scotland, with 19% of those living in the constituency retired (14.9% across Scotland) and 43.3% of constituents recognising their religion as Church of Scotland (32.4% across Scotland). 90% of residents identified their ethnicity as White British, with 99% recognising their ethnicity as White.

The town is home to the Robert Burns Academy, a new educational campus housing the main Robert Burns Academy secondary school following the merger of Cumnock Academy and Auchinleck Academy, Lochnorris Primary School and Cherry Trees Early Childhood Centre. The campus is the largest educational establishment in Scotland.

== History ==
=== Early Cumnock ===
==== Etymology ====
The origin of the name "Cumnock" has been debated over the years and several interpretations have been offered.

- Com-cnoc, (hollow of the hills)
- Com-oich, (meeting of the waters)
- Cam-cnoc, (crooked hill)
- Cumanag, (little shrine)

==== Early history ====
This part of Ayrshire has seen human settlement for over 5,000 years. There are many Bronze Age burial sites around the nearby area.

==== Medieval history ====
The patron saint of Cumnock is Saint Conval. It is believed that a place of worship has existed in Cumnock's Square for over 1,100 years, although the records do not begin until about 1275. James IV created the Burgh of Cumnock. Three castles existed in the parish of Old Cumnock, namely Borland, Terringzean and Lefnories or Lochnorris. Lefnories was the largest and was replaced as a dwelling by Dumfries House, with only the below ground foundations remaining, excavated by the Marquess of Bute in the late 19th century.

William Wallace allegedly spent three months in the seat of Patrick Dunbar ((New) Cumnock or Cumno in 1296), according to the poem The Wallace, by Blind Harry. Robert the Bruce, Robert I, was in Cumnock in 1307 being pursued by two of Edward I's men: Aymer de Valence, 2nd Earl of Pembroke, and John MacDougall of Lorn. The latter used Bruce's own bloodhound to track him. Bruce evaded capture and the bloodhound lost the scent when Bruce waded into a stream.

The place's name is mentioned, as 'Cummock', in chapter 1 of Sir Walter Scott's novel Castle Dangerous, which is set a few years later.

=== Industrial Cumnock ===
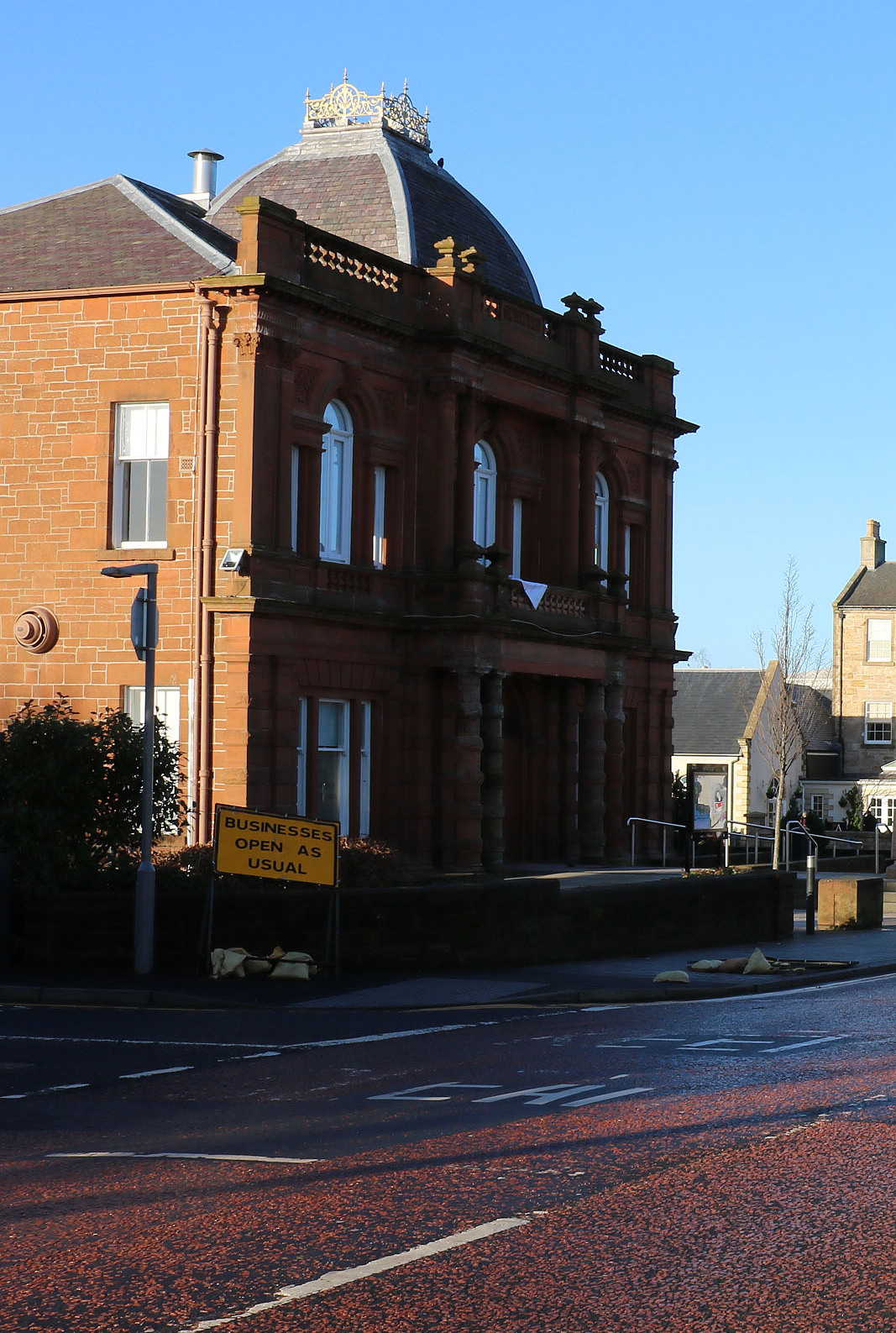
Cumnock Town Hall

The town has a strong socialist heritage due to its history as a mining centre. The father of the Labour Party, James Keir Hardie, lived in the town for a large part of his life, and his statue sits outside Cumnock Town Hall. The left-wing politician Emrys Hughes was local MP for a time in the mid-20th century, and also lived in the town.

=== Modern history ===
Whilst many traditional industries in Cumnock have declined, such as coal mining, common in many parts of East Ayrshire, the area has seen some revival to its economy. The development of Knockroon was expected to continue over a 25-year period, creating construction jobs in the local area, and was backed by The Prince's Foundation for the Built Environment, and is being designed on green principles. The first houses in the development were built by Hope Homes Scotland and ZeroC. King Charles III has expressed a personal interest in the development. Construction started in April 2011.

In February 2019 The Scotsman reported that only 31 of the planned 770 homes had been built.

Emergency One, one of the largest producers of fire engines in the UK, is located in Cumnock, and is a major employer in the Cumnock and the surrounding areas. Like most communities affected by the decline in coal mining, Cumnock has shifted towards a more skilled base and services economy.

== Politics and governance ==
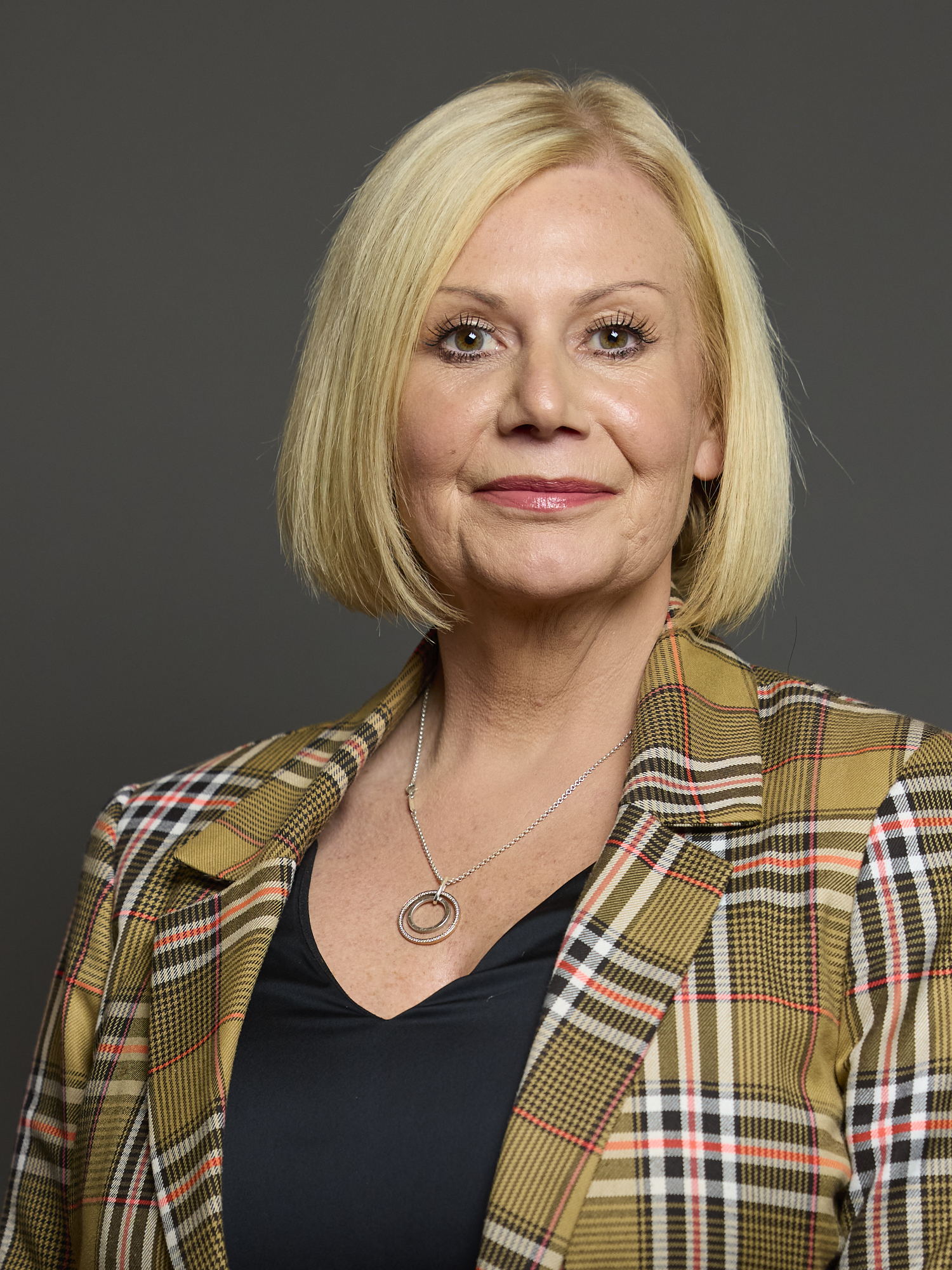
Elaine Stewart has been the MP for Cumnock since 2024

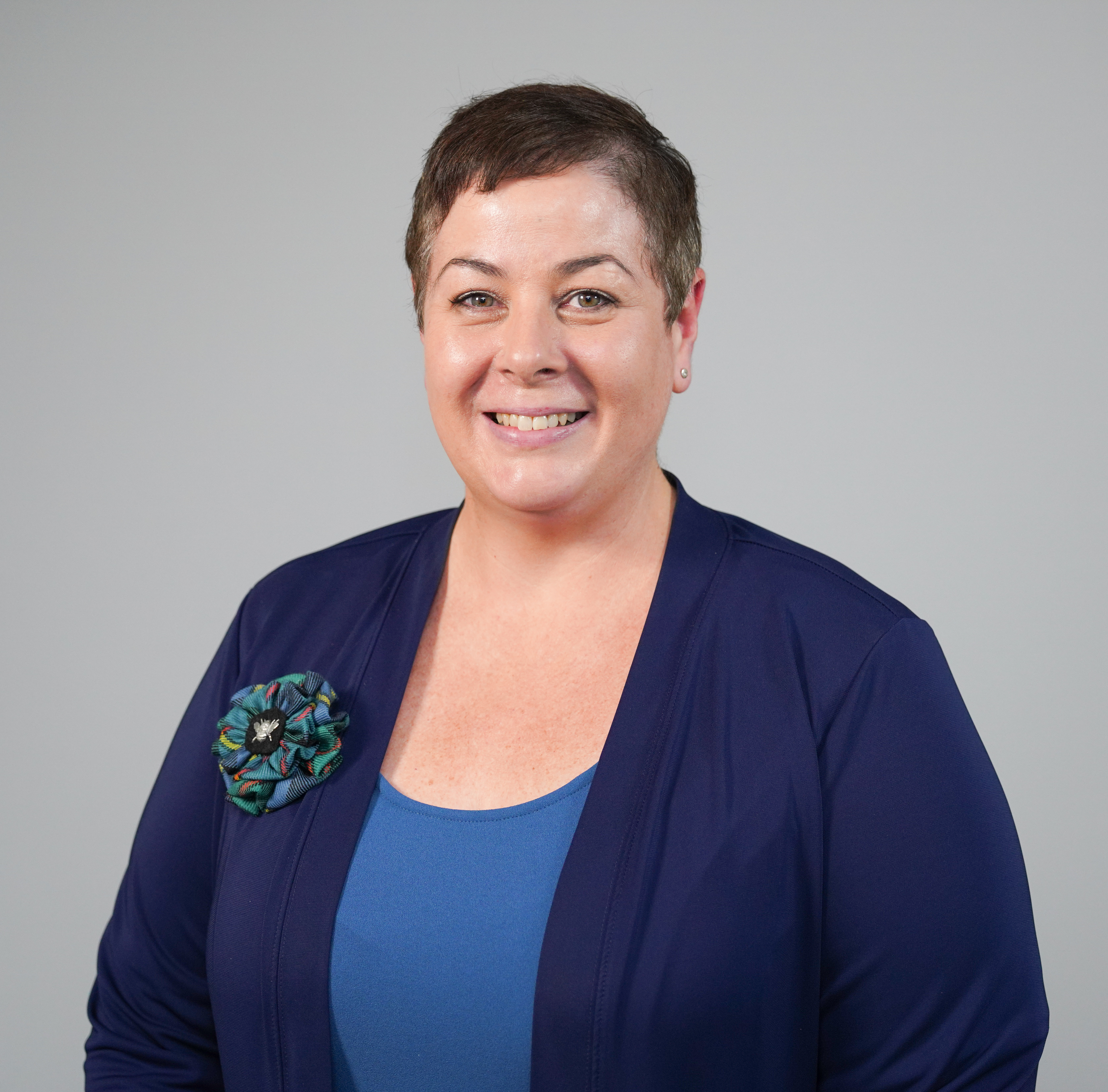
Elena Whitham has been the MSP for Cumnock since 2021

=== Local government ===
In East Ayrshire Council, the local government, Cumnock is represented as Cumnock and New Cumnock, whereby it elects four councillors to represent the area. Following the most recent 2022 East Ayrshire Council election, the four councillors elected to the ward were Billy Crawford (Scottish Labour Party), Neill Watts (Scottish Conservative and Unionist Party), Jim McMahon (Scottish National Party) and June Kyle (Scottish Labour Party).

==== Elected councillors ====
Election	Councillors			
2007	Billy Crawford (Labour)	Eric Ross (Labour)	Barney Menzies (Labour)	Kathy Morrice (SNP)
2012	Billy Crawford (Labour)	Eric Ross (Labour)	Barney Menzies (Labour)	Kathy Morrice (SNP)
2017	Billy Crawford (Labour)	Walter Young (Conservative)	Jim McMahon (SNP)	Jacqui Todd (SNP)
2022	Billy Crawford (Labour)	Neill Watts (Conservative)	Jim McMahon (SNP)	June Kyle (Labour)

=== Scottish Parliament ===
Cumnock is represented in the Scottish Parliament as Carrick, Cumnock and Doon Valley, currently represented by Elena Whitham MSP (Scottish National Party), elected in the 2021 Scottish Parliament election and replaced Jeane Freeman.

The Carrick, Cumnock and Doon Valley constituency was created following the re-establishment of the Scottish Parliament in 1999, and since then has been represented by the following MSPs.

Election	Member	Party
1999	Cathy Jamieson	Labour
2011	Adam Ingram	SNP
2016	Jeane Freeman	SNP
2021	Elena Whitham	SNP

=== UK Parliament ===
In the House of Commons, the UK Parliament, Cumnock is represented as Ayr, Carrick and Cumnock, currently represented by Elaine Stewart MP (Labour). The constituency was created in the 2005 United Kingdom general election following the boundary review which saw the constituency created from the former constituencies of Ayr and Carrick, Cumnock and Doon Valley.

== Churches ==
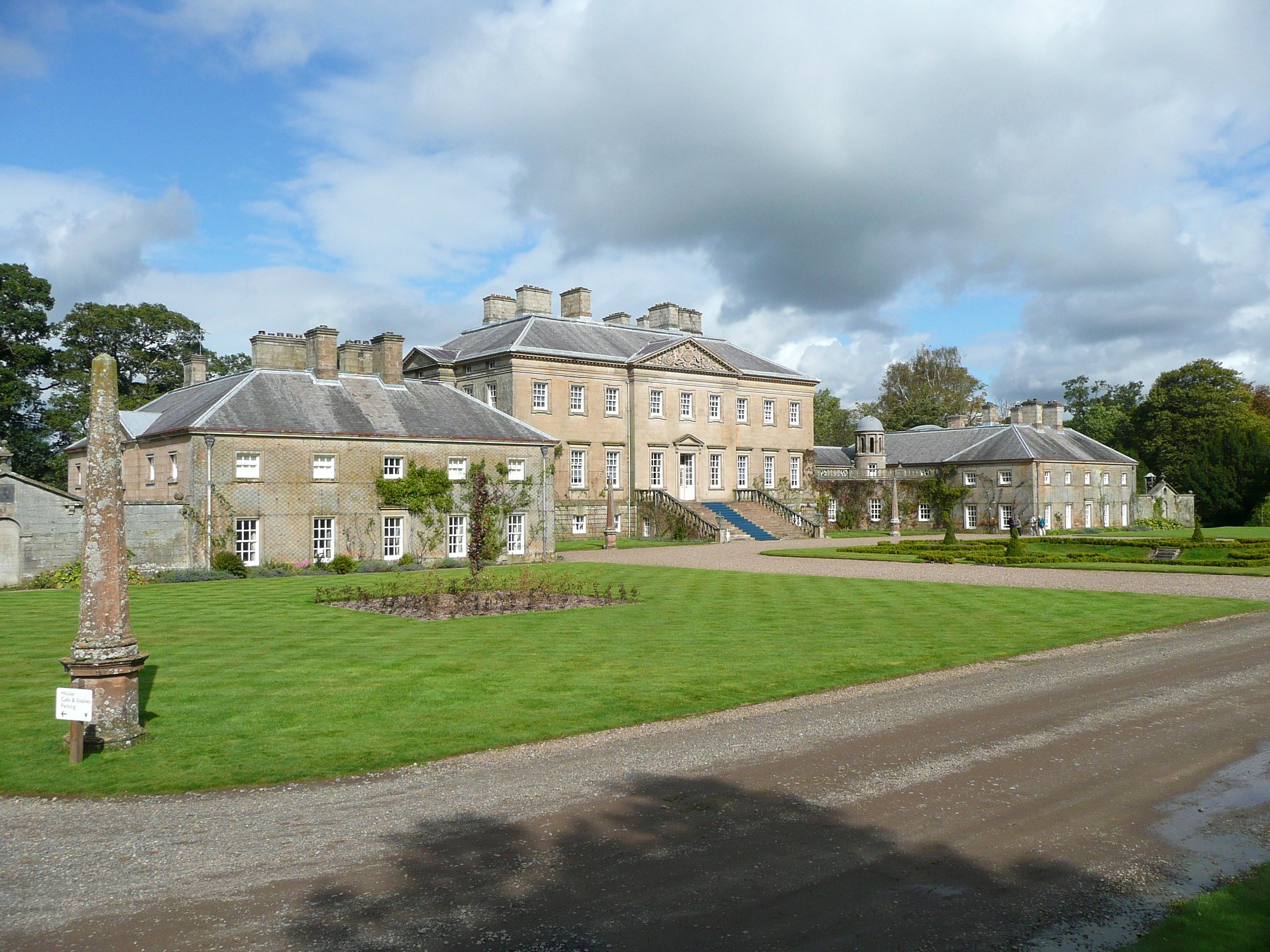
Dumfries House, located in the town, is owned by the Prince's Trust

The town has six churches, five Protestant churches, the Congregational Church, Old Cumnock Old Parish Church, St Andrew's United Free Church, Cumnock Trinity Church, Cumnock Baptist Church, and the Roman Catholic St John the Evangelist Church (1878–1880), by architect William Burges for the third Marquess of Bute.

== Education ==
Cumnock is home to the largest educational campus in Scotland, the Robert Burns Academy, a new educational campus housing the main Robert Burns Academy secondary school following the merger of Cumnock Academy and Auchinleck Academy, Lochnorris Primary School and Cherry Trees Early Childhood Centre.

One other primary school is located within the town at Netherthird Primary School. Barshare Primary School closed and was demolished in 2021 following the merger of Barshare and Greenmill Primary School to form the new Lochnorris Primary School located within the Barony Campus.

Nearby Dumfries House offers a variety of educational programmes and apprenticeships through the Dumfries House Educational Programme created by The Prince's Trust. The programme offers vocational training and education in the fields of Science, Technology, Engineering and Maths (STEM), textiles, outdoor and resilience building, hospitality and horticulture amongst others. When Prince Charles, Duke of Rothesay's, bought the estate of Dumfries House in 2007, he created the educational programme at Dumfries House in an attempt to see young people undertake learning experiences and training that promote confidence, personal development and offer training in real life skills.

Further education is provided at Ayrshire College, with its nearest campus in Kilmarnock, and university education at University of the West of Scotland located at the Ayr campus.

== Transport ==
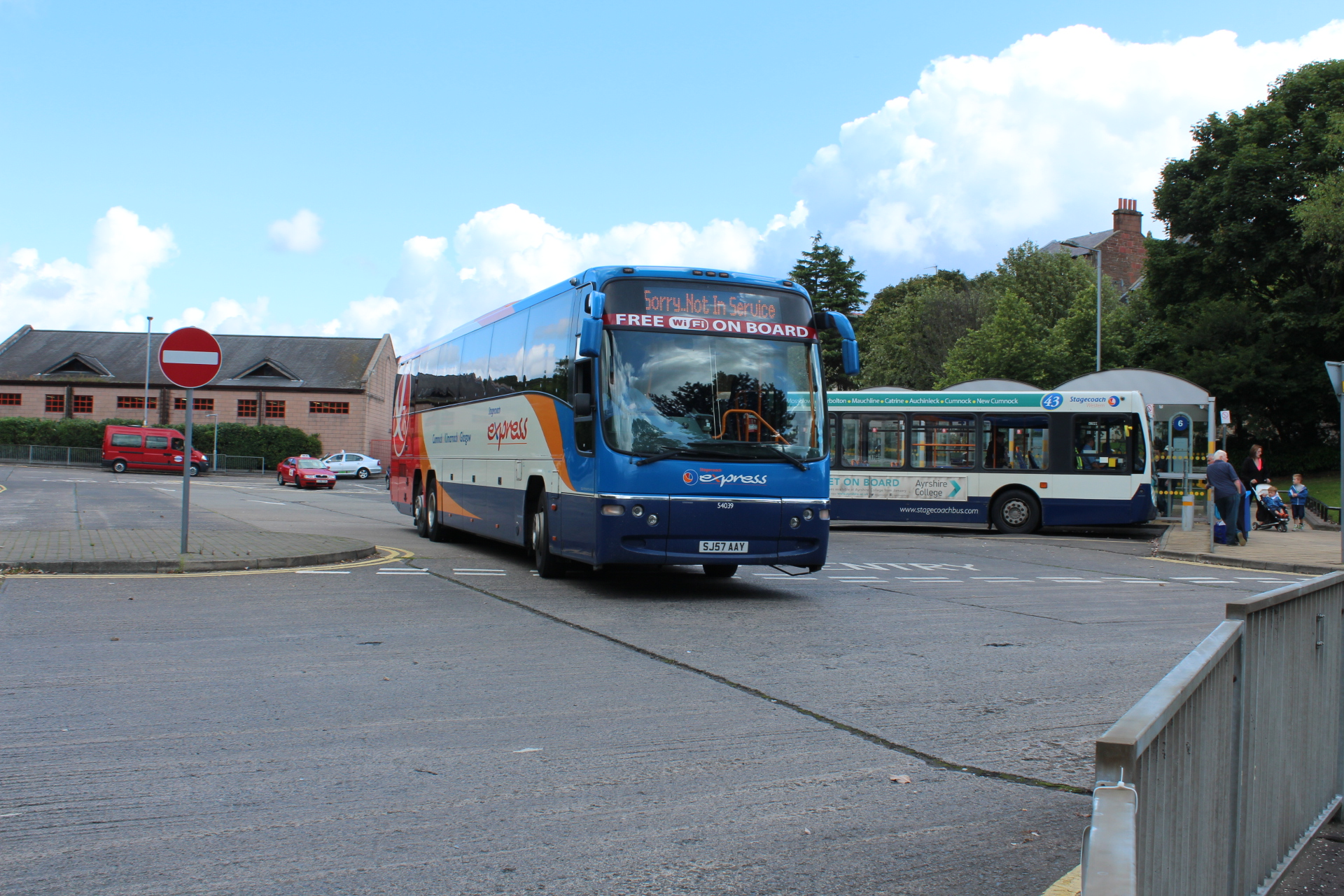
Buses at Cumnock Bus Station, 2014

Cumnock has its own bus terminal, Cumnock Bus Station, which is operated by both Stagecoach West Scotland and Strathclyde Partnership for Transport. In July 2020, redevelopment of the bus station was completed with new shelters and CCTV being provided.

The original Cumnock railway station opened on 20 May 1850. The station was renamed to Cumnock on 10 January 1955, and closed to passengers on 6 December 1965.

A second, and to date, last Cumnock railway station opened to passengers on 1 July 1872, and closed on 10 September 1951. The second Cumnock railway station was originally part of the Annbank to Cronberry Branch on the Glasgow and South Western Railway.

Cumnock is connected to nearby settlements including Kilmarnock, the principal town in East Ayrshire, and other smaller settlements such as Mauchline by the A76 road. The A70 also connects Cumnock to other large towns including Ayr.

== Sports ==
The local football team is Cumnock Juniors, who compete in the Lowland League West and play their home matches at Townhead Park. The team has a bitter rivalry with local neighbours Auchinleck Talbot. The town also has an athletics park and rugby club Cumnock RFC, as well as a modern sports centre containing fitness gym and swimming pool.

== Notable residents ==
- Mark Bennett, Scottish international rugby player
- James MacMillan, composer
- George Burley, former footballer mostly playing for Ipswich Town, and manager for Ipswich Town, Derby County, Scotland and others
- Craig Burley, former footballer mostly playing for Celtic, Chelsea and Derby County, now a pundit on ESPN FC; nephew of George Burley
- Rachel Shankland, Scotland international rugby player
- Lorraine McIntosh, Scottish vocalist with Deacon Blue, and actress

== See also ==
- Cumnock and Holmhead
- Terringzean Castle
- Black Loch, New Cumnock
- Lands of Borland, Barony of Cumnock

== Sources ==
- Butt, R. V. J. (October 1995). The Directory of Railway Stations: details every public and private passenger station, halt, platform and stopping place, past and present (1st ed.). Sparkford: Patrick Stephens Ltd. ISBN 978-1-85260-508-7. OCLC 60251199. OL 11956311M.
