= East Ayrshire =

Council area of Scotland

East Ayrshire: Siorrachd Àir an Ear (Scottish Gaelic); Aest Ayrshire (Scots)
- Council area
- Coat of arms
- Motto: Forward Together
- East Ayrshire shown within Scotland
- Coordinates: 55.5°N 4.3°W
- Sovereign state: United Kingdom
- Country: Scotland
- Lieutenancy area: Ayrshire and Arran
- Unitary authority: 1 April 1996
- Administrative HQ: Kilmarnock

Government
  - Type: Council
  - Body: East Ayrshire Council
  - Control: No overall control
  - Provost: Claire Leitch
  - Council leader: Douglas Reid
  - MPs: 2 MPs: Lillian Jones (L); Elaine Stewart (L)
  - MSPs: 2 MSPs: Willie Coffey (SNP); Elena Whitham (SNP)

Area
  - Total: 487 sq mi (1,262 km^{2})
  - Rank: 14th

Population (2024)
  - Total: 121,480
  - Rank: 16th
  - Density: 250/sq mi (96/km^{2})
- Time zone: UTC+0 (GMT)
  - Summer (DST): UTC+1 (BST)
- ISO 3166 code: GB-EAY
- GSS code: S12000008
- Website: east-ayrshire.gov.uk

East Ayrshire (Scots: Aest Ayrshire; Scottish Gaelic: Siorrachd Àir an Ear) is one of 32 unitary council areas of Scotland. It shares borders with Dumfries and Galloway, East Renfrewshire, North Ayrshire, South Ayrshire and South Lanarkshire. The headquarters of the council are located on London Road, Kilmarnock. With South Ayrshire and the mainland areas of North Ayrshire, it formed the former county of Ayrshire.

East Ayrshire had a population of 122,100 at the 2011 census, making it the 16th most populous local authority in Scotland. Spanning a geographical area of 1,262 km^{2} (487 sq mi), East Ayrshire is the 14th-largest local authority in Scotland in terms of geographical area. The majority of the population of East Ayrshire live within and surrounding the main town, Kilmarnock. Other large population areas in East Ayrshire include Cumnock, the second-largest town, and smaller towns and villages such as Stewarton, Darvel, Bellsbank, and Hurlford.

The area is home to the largest education campus in Scotland, the Robert Burns Academy, which is located in the second largest town, Cumnock.

== History ==
=== Early settlements ===
The area which is now East Ayrshire features indications of early settlement dating as far back as 397. The presence of the Dragon Stone in Darvel, along with cup and ring markings near to the Ballochmyle Viaduct at Mauchline, indicate early occupation and settlement in and around East Ayrshire. The area's first permanent settlement is said to date from the expansion of Christianity in Scotland, after St Ninian established a church at Whithorn.

=== 13th–15th century ===
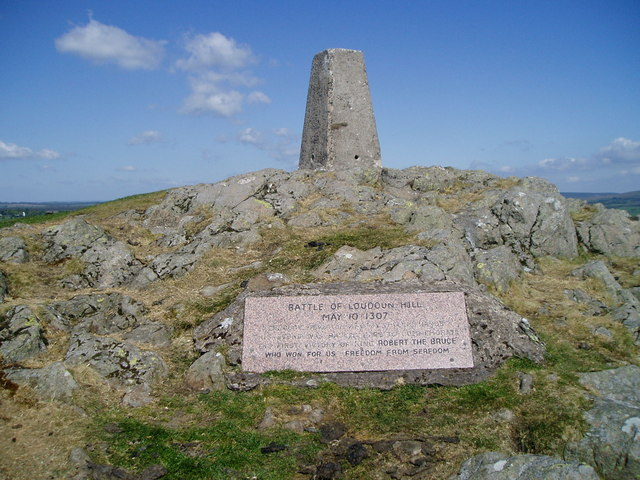
Battle plaque, marking the location of the Battle of Loudoun Hill in 1307

East Ayrshire is home to a number of towers, castles and other structures which were constructed between the 13th–15th century. Many of the areas castles played a prominent role, largely in part due to barons being at the peak of military and political powers. Many of the barons were involved in wider Scottish politics and affairs, in particular, resistance to the advances of Edward I towards Scotland. Prominent Scottish independence figure William Wallace has close connections with East Ayrshire. The Wallace family had a castle at Riccarton, later part of Kilmarnock, as well as his surprise attack on the English at Loudoun Hill in 1297. Wallace is also associated with Lockhart's Tower in the town of Galston. Lockhart's Tower was largely rebuilt during the middle ages, and is commonly referred to as Barr Castle presently. Wallace is said to "have made a daring escape" from Lockhart's Tower at one point.

During the First War of Scottish Independence, the areas Loudoun Hill was the scene of a Scottish victory over the English during the Battle of Loudoun Hill on 10 May 1307. The battlefield at Loudoun Hill is currently under research to be included in the Inventory of Historic Battlefields in Scotland and protected by Historic Scotland under the Scottish Historical Environment Policy of 2009.

=== 17th century ===
During the 17th century, the Covenanters were particularly active in the East Ayrshire area, as well as along Scotland's west coast where they began promoting National Covenant. During this period, a significant number of Covenanters died as a result of advocating their beliefs. In order to commemorate those lost, a number of sites and monuments in East Ayrshire were erected, including Fenwick Kirk Yard, the Laigh Kirk in Kilmarnock, Galston Kirk Yard, Loudoun Old Parish Kirk near Galston, Newmilns Keep and Kirkyard, Threepwood near Galston, Lochgoyne Farm above Fenwick, Priesthill Farm near Muirkirk, Mauchline, Sorn, Cumnock and Airds Moss near Cumnock. In 1648, Mauchline was the location of a battle between the Covenanters and Royalists, known as the Battle of Mauchline Muir. A Covenanters Memorial was erected in Loan Green in Mauchline, commemorating the five martyrs who were hanged at the site in 1685.

During the 17th century, the establishment of 'Burghs of Barony' titles evolved. Many towns in modern day East Ayrshire were granted charters which allowed them to use the newly created title. Such towns and settlements which were granted Burgh of Barony status included Newmilns in 1491, Auchinleck in 1507, Cumnock in 1509, Kilmarnock in 1592 and Riccarton in 1638. With the settlements using the newly granted titles, the settlements were said to have "flourished and prospered after the granting of their Charters, with lively trade in agriculture, livestock and textiles".

=== 18th–19th century ===
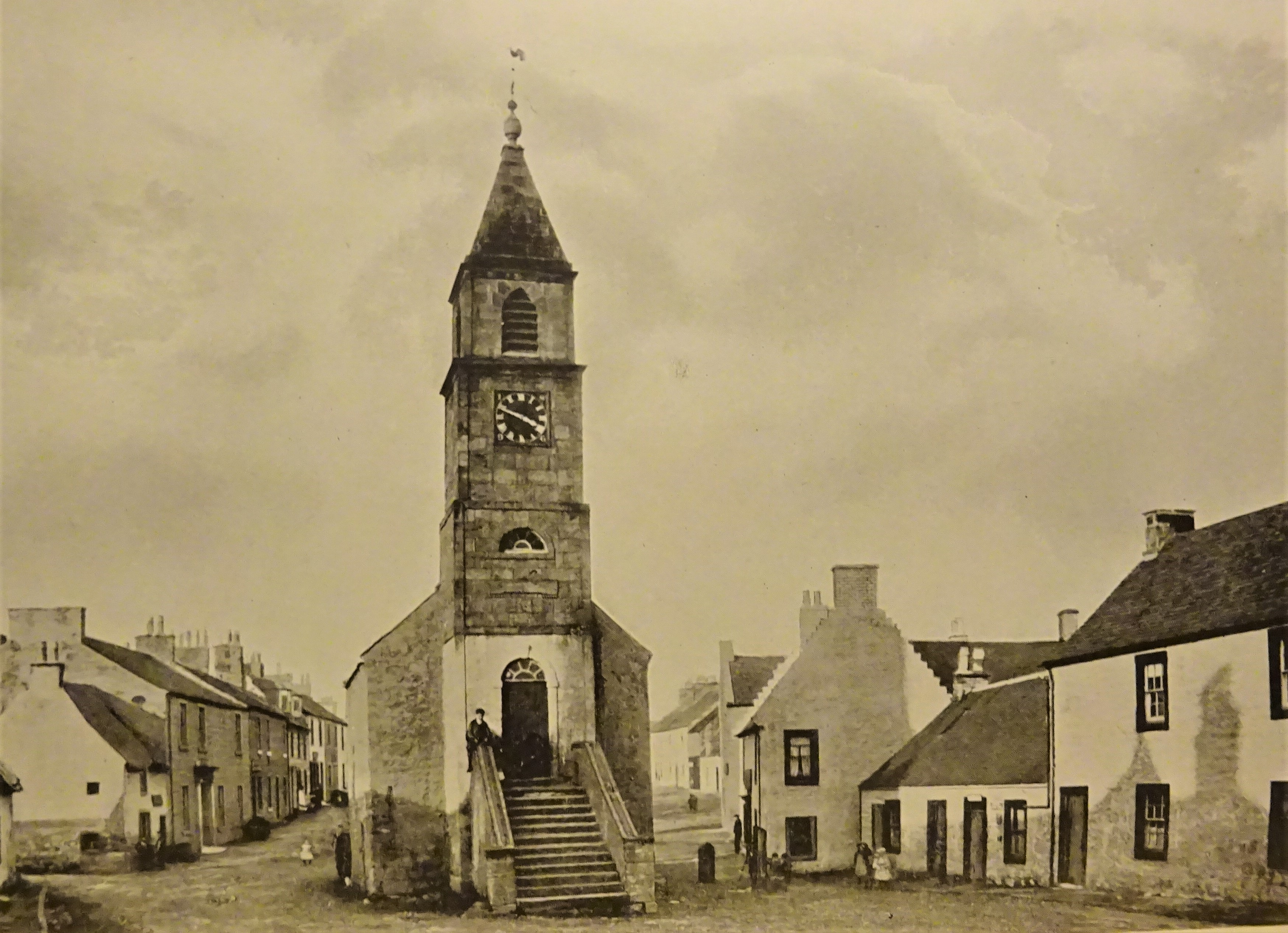
The Jougs in Kilmaurs in 1900, served as the council chamber for the Burgh of Kilmaurs

The arrival of the 18th century saw economic prosperity arrive in the area, with the main hub for industry arguably being Kilmarnock. During the 18th and 19th centuries, East Ayrshire became one of the industrial powerhouses of the expanding British Empire. Largely it was textile production which dominated the industrial expansion in the area, with other industries including muslin, cotton, blankets, carpets and woollen goods being produced in Kilmarnock. Other settlements, such as Stewarton, became known internationally its manufacturing of bonnets, and the Irvine Valley region had become renowned for its specialised lace industry.

During this period, coal mining was considered an important economic asset across the area, particularly in communities such as Dalmellington and Patna. Additionally, iron making was developed at locations such as at Dunaskin in the Doon Valley, ultimately in which all were contributed to the importance of industry in East Ayrshire. The areas strength in industry and manufacturing allowed other sectors to develop in many parts of East Ayrshire, including the manufacturing of railway rolling stock in Kilmarnock which would later become exported internationally.

=== Strathclyde Regional Council ===
In May 1975, the county council was abolished and its functions were transferred to Strathclyde Regional Council. Subsequently, the county area was divided between four new districts within the two-tier Strathclyde region: Cumnock and Doon Valley, Cunninghame, Kilmarnock and Loudoun and Kyle and Carrick. The Cunninghame district included the Isle of Arran, Great Cumbrae and Little Cumbrae, which had until then been administered as part of the County of Bute.

The former Kilmarnock and Loudoun District Council was twinned with Sukhumi, Abkhazia. Following a review of such links in 2005, East Ayrshire continues the link as a friendship link.

=== East Ayrshire Council ===
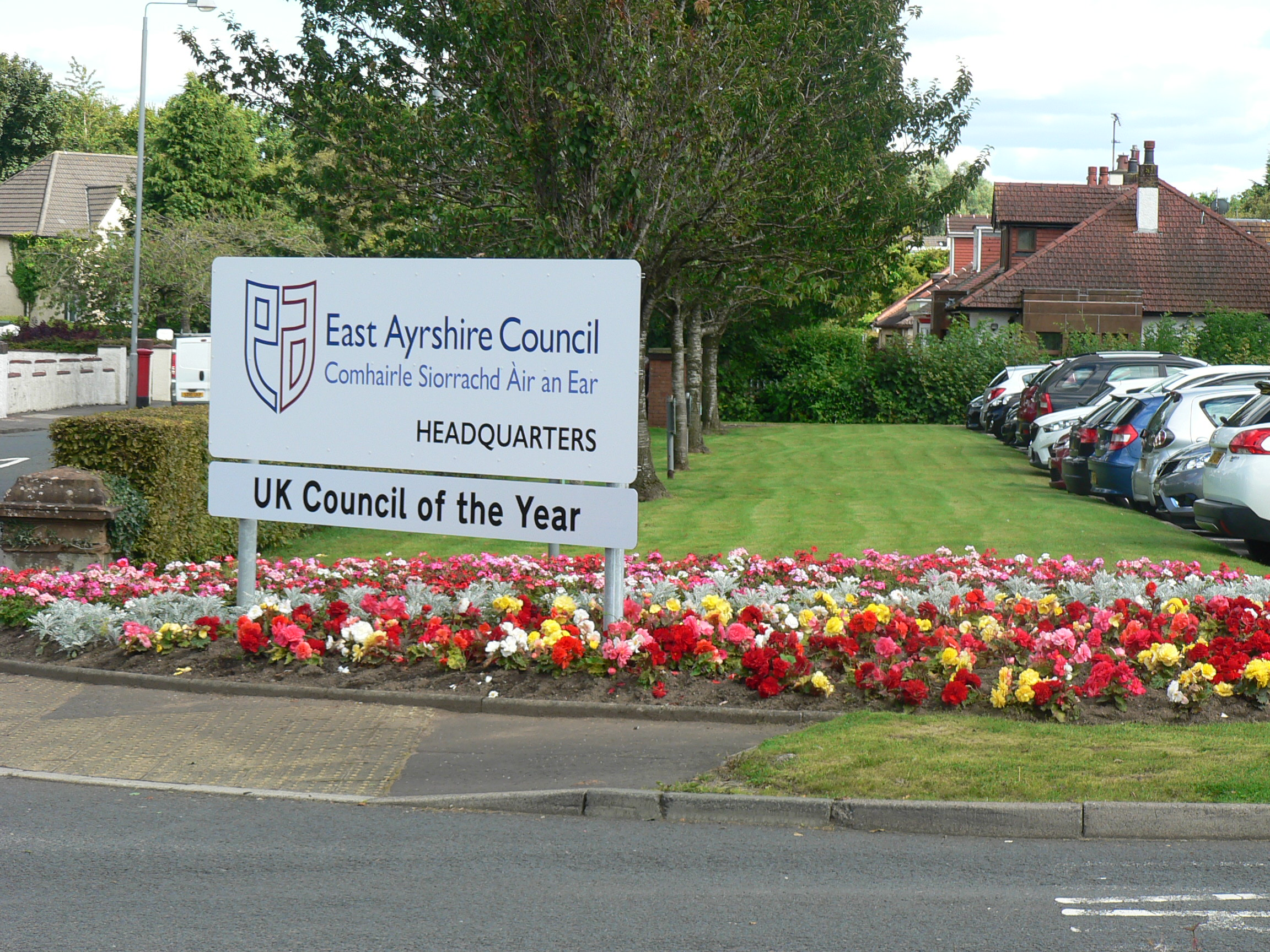
East Ayrshire was established in 1996, with Kilmarnock becoming its administrative centre

East Ayrshire, and its associated political body, East Ayrshire Council, was created in 1996 under the Local Government etc. (Scotland) Act 1994, which replaced Scotland's previous local government structure of upper-tier regions and lower-tier districts with unitary council areas providing all local government services. East Ayrshire covered the combined area of the abolished Kilmarnock and Loudoun and Cumnock and Doon Valley districts, and also took over the functions of the abolished Strathclyde Regional Council within the area. The area's name references its location within the historic county of Ayrshire, which had been abolished for local government purposes in 1975 when Kilmarnock and Loudoun, Cumnock and Doon Valley, and Strathclyde region had been created.

In April 1996 the two-tier system of regions and districts was abolished and Ayrshire was divided between the unitary council areas of East Ayrshire (covering the area of the former Kilmarnock & Loudoun District and Cumnock & Doon Valley District), North Ayrshire (covering the area of the former Cunninghame District Council) and South Ayrshire (covering the area of the former Kyle and Carrick District). There are many early settlements within East Ayrshire. The Burns Monument Centre and Dick Institute (both in Kilmarnock) are notable museums and cultural venues.

In 2017, East Ayrshire Council was named as the UK Council of the Year. In 2016, East Ayrshire Council was awarded and recognised for its recycling and resource management.

== Economy ==
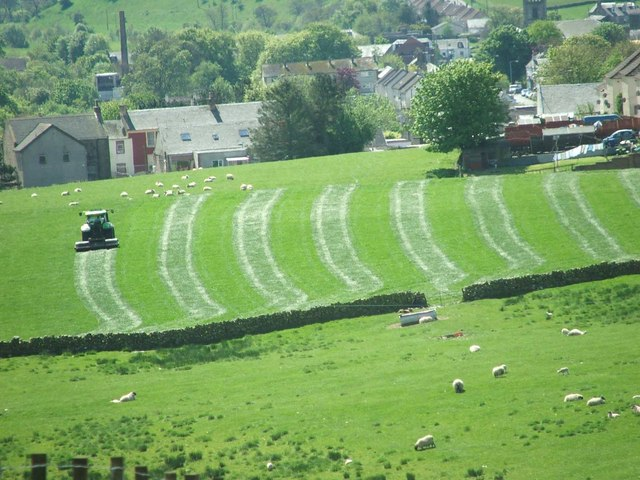
Agriculture contributes a large part to East Ayrshire's economy

=== Economic history ===
Historically the economy of East Ayrshire was dependent on industries such as coal mining, textiles and general manufacturing which largely fell into decline in Scotland during the 1970s and 1980s. Certain parts of East Ayrshire, particularly in the south of the region, such as Auchinleck, Bellsbank and Dalmellington have struggled to recover from the economic hardship caused by the decline and gradual closure of traditional industries, and are supported through various initiatives to try and rejuvenate their economies.

Kilmarnock has seen a gradual decline in manufacturing performance in recent years. In 2009, Diageo, owner of whisky maker Johnnie Walker (which had been founded in Kilmarnock) announced the proposed closure of the bottling plant facility in Hill Street, and in 2012, Diageo closed the facility with the loss of 700 jobs. In December 2015, Kilmarnock was awarded the title of Scotland's Most Improved Town due to efforts towards town regeneration and restoration.

=== Modern economy ===
In rural communities of the authority, agriculture continues to be the leading sources of employment and economic productivity, particularly in the southern communities of the area. The public sector is the largest employer within the area, with the council and NHS Ayrshire and Arran being significant employers. Kilmarnock is home to the HALO Urban Regeneration company which was founded by Marie Macklin CBE, with a focus on providing opportunities for new businesses within the area, and with an estimated Gross Domestic Product (GDP) revenue of £205 million to the Scottish economy, it supports 1,500 jobs within the area.

=== Tourism ===
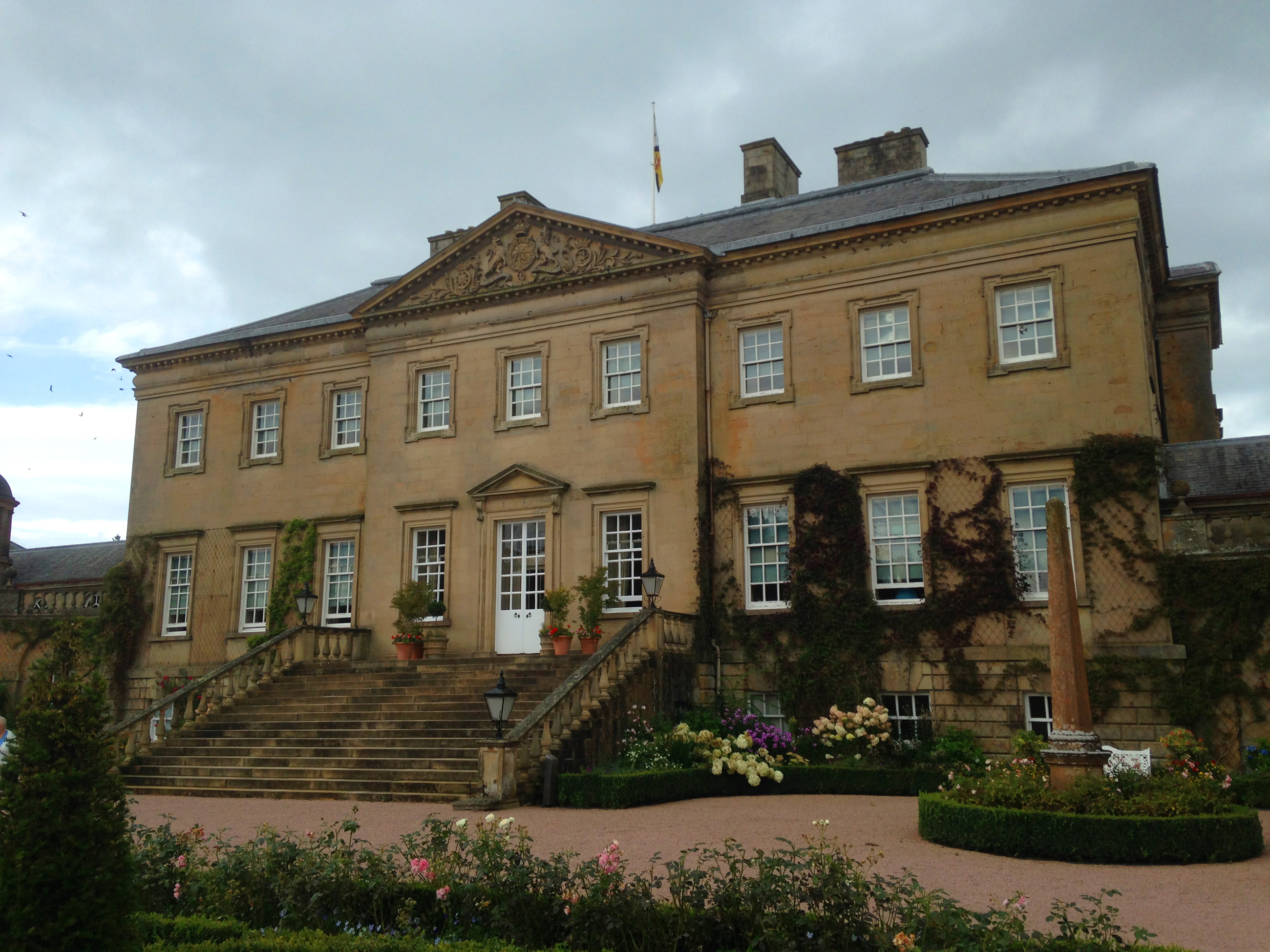
Dumfries House located in Cumnock has developed itself as a major local tourist attraction

Food and drink as well as local tourism provides a large sum to the economy of East Ayrshire, with visitor attractions such as Dean Castle, Palace Theatre and Dumfries House generating large means of income for the area.

Places of interest within East Ayrshire include:

- Aiket Castle
- Auchinleck House
- Dalmore House and Estate
- Dean Castle
- Dumfries House
- Kilmaurs Place
- Loch Doon
- Loudoun Castle
- Robertland House
- Rowallan Castle
- Scottish Industrial Railway Centre
- Sorn Castle
- Stair House

=== Gross domestic product ===
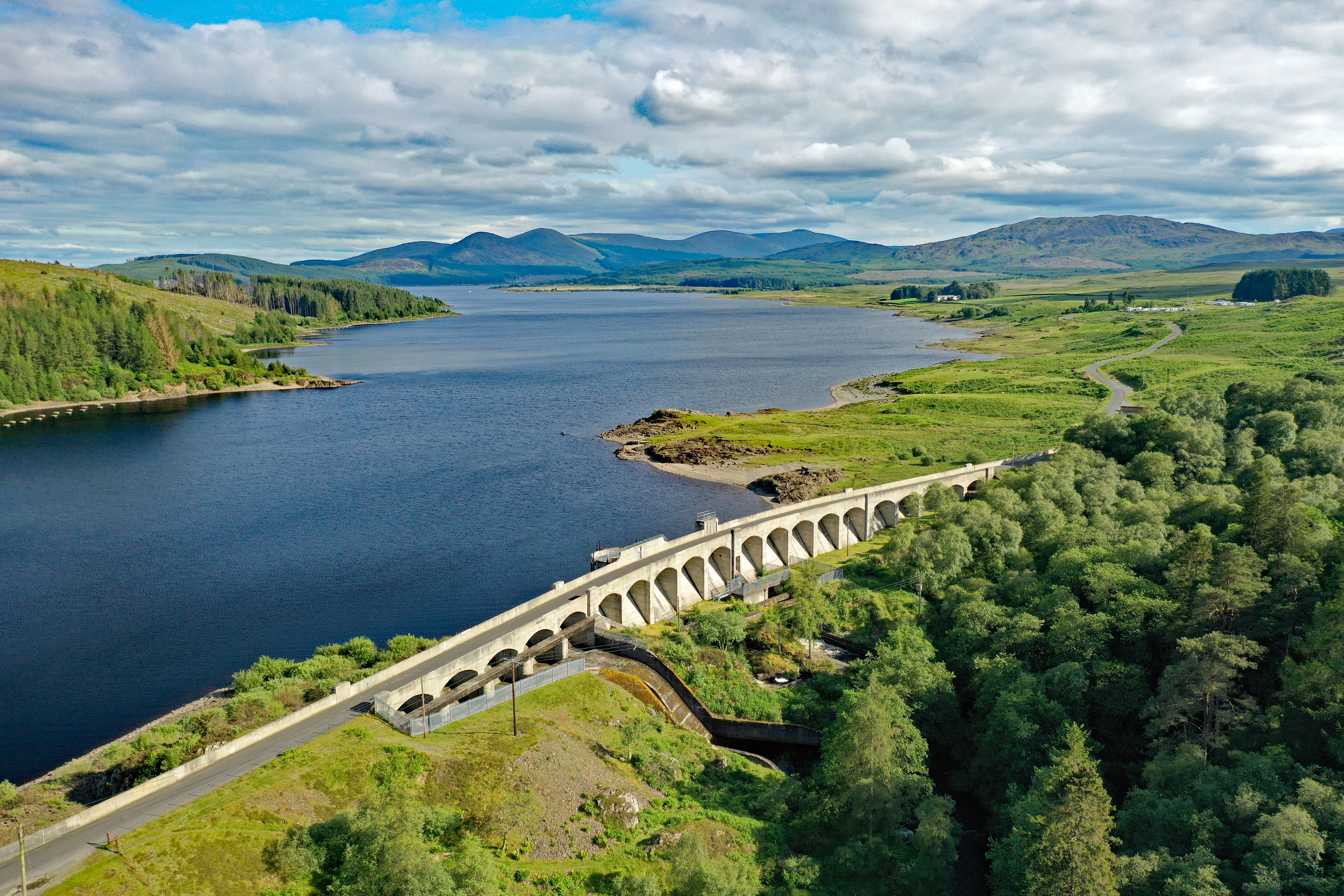
Loch Doon in East Ayrshire, near to Carrick

In 2022, the gross domestic product (GDP) of East Ayrshire (which includes the mainland of North Ayrshire for purposes of calculating GDP) was estimated at £5.075 billion. Amongst Scotland's 32 local council areas, combined, East Ayrshire and mainland North Ayrshire are ranked as the 12th largest amongst Scottish areas by GDP rank.

The average gross weekly pay for full time employees in East Ayrshire in 2023 was £708.80, higher than the Scotland average of £702.40.

=== Employment trends ===
Between January–December 2023, an estimated 56,300 people were classed as economically active within East Ayrshire, with 55,600 classed as in employment, 49,400 employees of businesses or organisations, with a further 5,700 classed as self employed. During this period, East Ayrshire had an unemployment rate of 3.2%, about 1,900 people of the population.

The largest category of economic activity in East Ayrshire in 2023 was professional occupations, with an estimated 10,600 people (19.2%) of the East Ayrshire population employed in this sector. Other large sectors for employment across East Ayrshire include skilled trades occupations (14.0%), caring, leisure And other service occupations (13.3%), elementary occupations (9.0%), Managers, Directors And Senior Officials (7.7%) and process plant and machine operatives (7.4%).

== Services ==
=== Health care ===
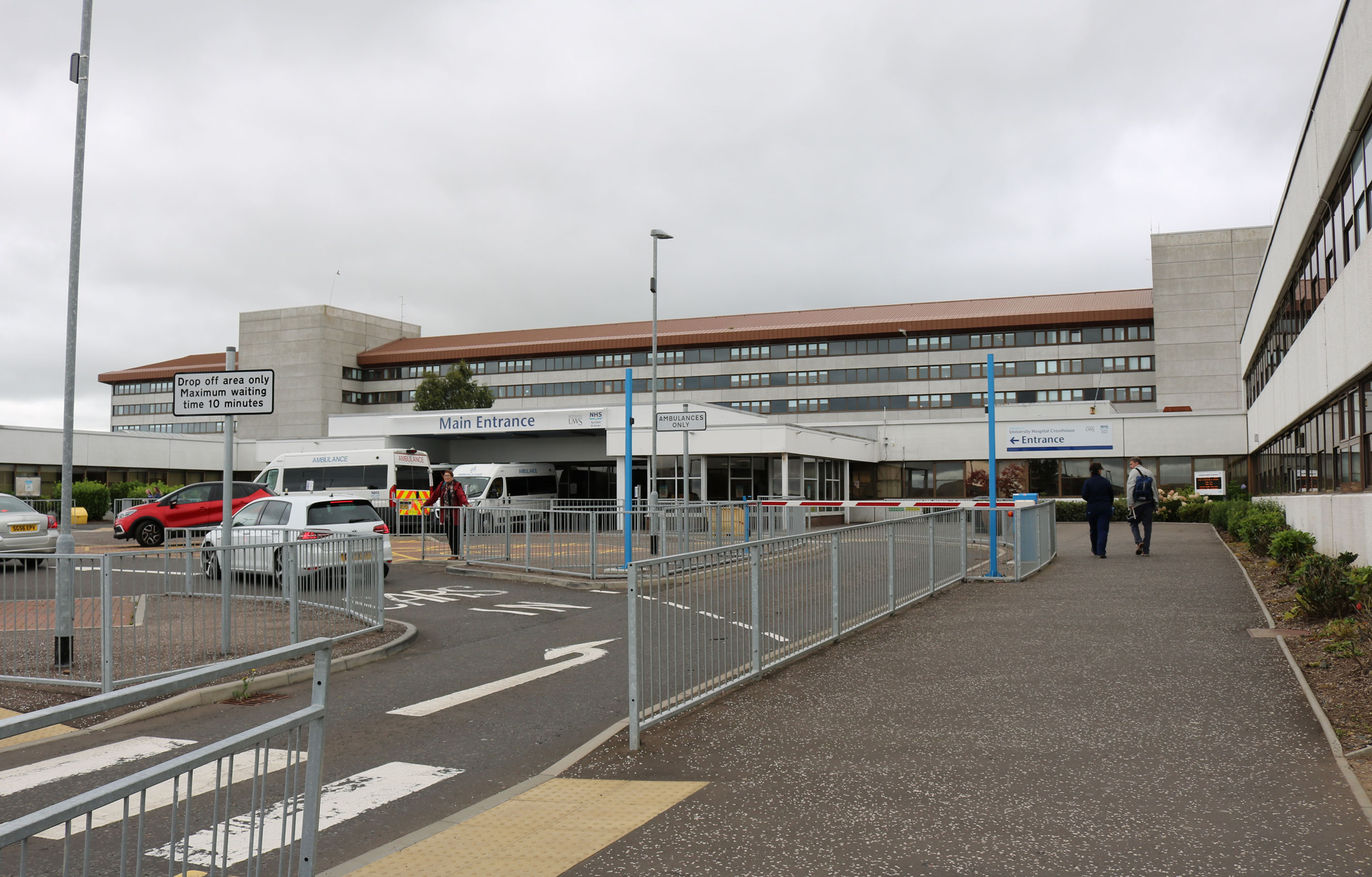
University Hospital Crosshouse, outside Kilmarnock, is the regions largest hospital

Health care in East Ayrshire is provided by NHS Ayrshire and Arran, one of the fourteen regions of NHS Scotland. The health boards main, and largest, hospital is University Hospital Crosshouse located between the village of Crosshouse and the administrative town of East Ayrshire, Kilmarnock. Other NHS Ayrshire and Arran hospitals within East Ayrshire include East Ayrshire Community Hospital in Cumnock, and the former Kirklandside Hospital in Hurlford.

Work on University Hospital Crosshouse, which was commissioned to replace the Kilmarnock Infirmary, began on the site in August 1972 with completion expected in May 1977. The contractor, Melville Dundas & Whitson, encountered difficulties with the water supply and ventilation systems and the facility was only officially opened by George Younger, Secretary of State for Scotland, as Crosshouse Hospital in June 1984. A new maternity unit, which replaced a similar facility at Ayrshire Central Hospital in Irvine was opened in the grounds of the hospital in 2006. In March 2012, the hospital officially became University Hospital Crosshouse as a result of a partnership with the University of the West of Scotland.

Kirklandside Hospital, in neighbouring village Hurlford closed between 2018 and 2020. Kirklandside hospital provided consultant-led services for frail elderly patients. It had 25 long-stay beds for inpatient care and a day hospital which provided assessment and rehabilitation facilities.

East Ayrshire is served by a number of general practice (GP) surgeries under NHS Scotland and a variety of other healthcare services including dental treatment and pharmacies.

=== Education ===
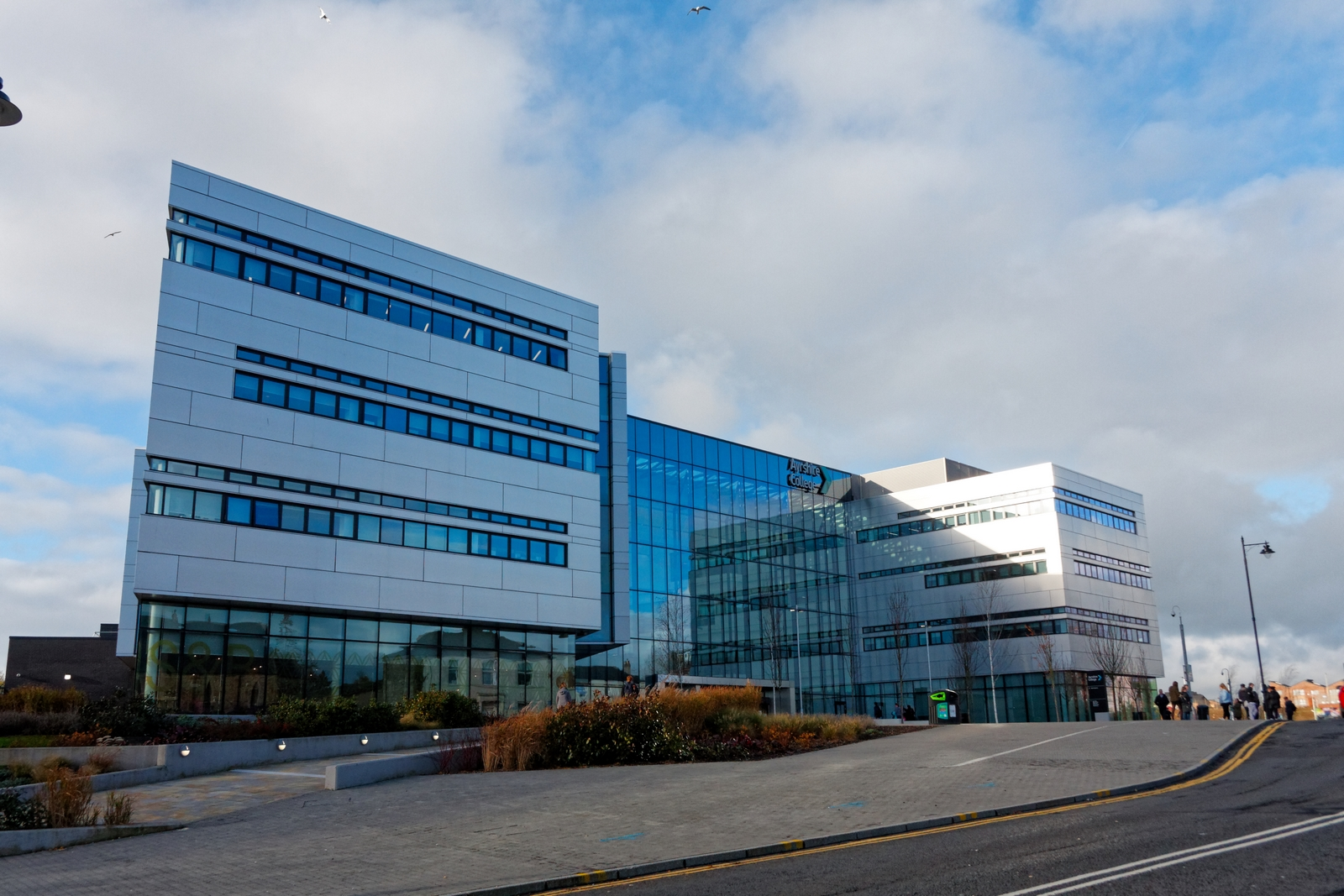
The new Ayrshire College campus opened in Kilmarnock in October 2016

East Ayrshire has nine secondary schools, forty-three primary schools, four schools which cater for children with additional support needs, thirty-three early education childhood centres and three children's houses.

Kilmarnock Academy is one of only two schools in the world to have educated two Nobel laureates: Alexander Fleming and John Boyd Orr. Both men attended Kilmarnock Academy when it was located on North Hamilton Street; the school has since relocated to Sutherland Drive.

Grange Academy in Kilmarnock, is one of only seven Scottish Football Association (SFA) Performance Schools.

The Robert Burns Academy in Cumnock is the largest educational campus in Scotland.

The area's secondary schools include:

- Doon Academy
- Grange Academy
- Kilmarnock Academy
- Loudoun Academy
- Robert Burns Academy
- St Joseph's Academy
- Stewarton Academy

Kilmarnock is home to a campus of Ayrshire College, which provides a range of courses to adults as well as school-aged pupils. It is funded by East Ayrshire council and other educational providers. The campus opened in October 2016 in a new, £53 million, building on the site of the Johnnie Walker bottling plant. It superseded the Kilmarnock College building on Holehouse Road.

== Politics and governance ==
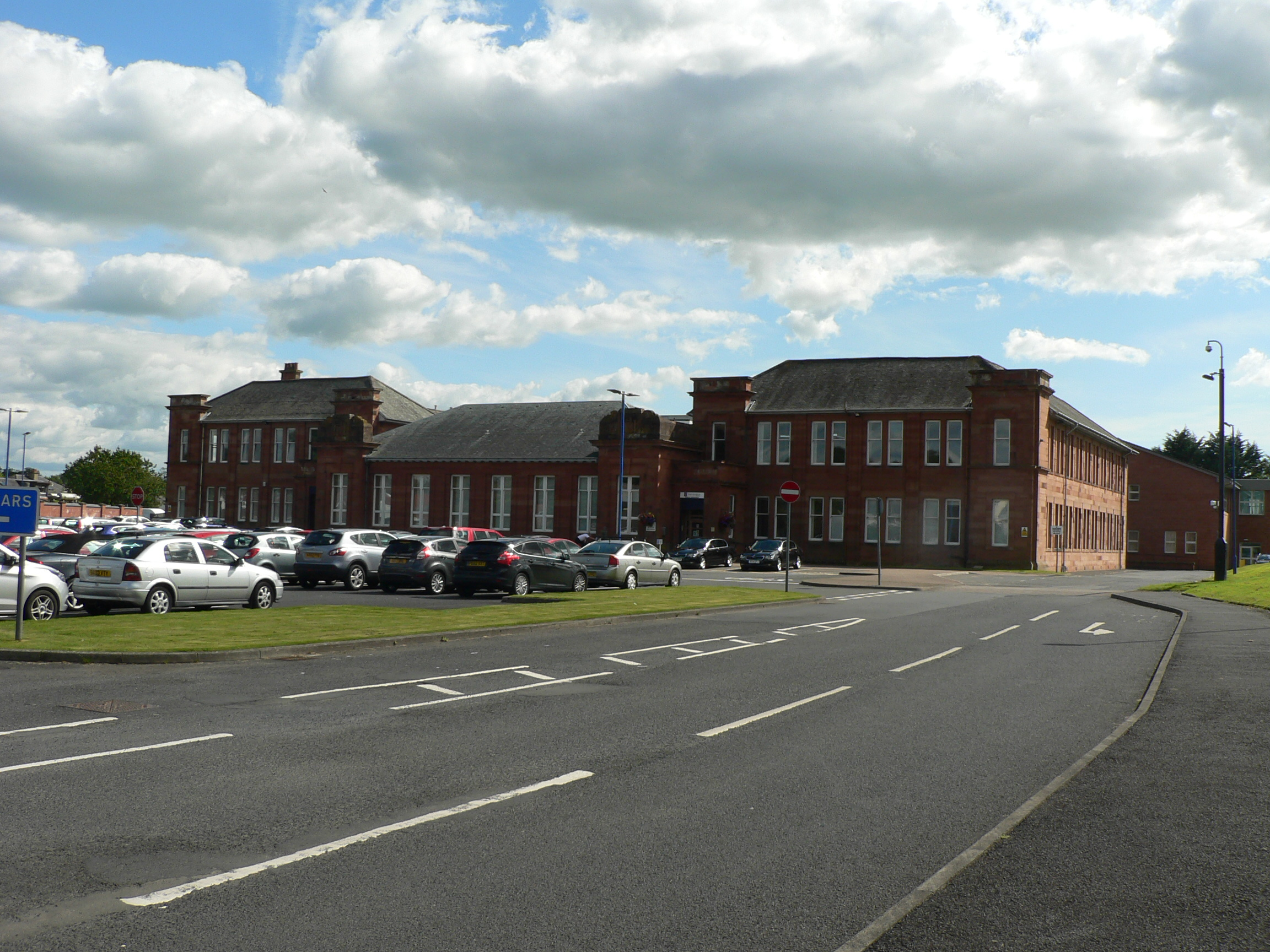
East Ayrshire Council is based in Kilmarnock which is the areas administrative centre

Policy and decision making in East Ayrshire is the responsibility of East Ayrshire Council, the body of elected councillors elected to represent East Ayrshire on the council. The council chambers and HQ is located on London Road in Kilmarnock.

Elected members to the UK Parliament

Constituency	Member	Party
Kilmarnock and Loudoun	Lillian Jones	Scottish Labour Party
Ayr, Carrick and Cumnock	Elaine Stewart	Scottish Labour Party

Elected members to the Scottish Parliament
Constituency MSPs

Constituency	Member	Party
Kilmarnock and Irvine Valley	Willie Coffey	Scottish National Party (SNP)
Carrick, Cumnock and Doon Valley	Elena Whitham	Scottish National Party (SNP)

Regional List MSPs

Constituency	Member	Party
South Scotland	Emma Harper	Scottish National Party
South Scotland	Craig Hoy	Scottish Conservative
South Scotland	Brian Whittle	Scottish Conservative
South Scotland	Sharon Dowey	Scottish Conservative
South Scotland	Carol Mochan	Scottish Labour
South Scotland	Martin Whitfield	Scottish Labour
South Scotland	Colin Smyth	Scottish Labour

== Languages ==
The 2022 Scottish Census reported that out of 116,955 residents aged three and over, 48,961 (41.9%) considered themselves able to speak or read the Scots language. This puts East Ayrshire as the council area with the third highest proficiency in Scots.

The 2022 Scottish Census reported that out of 116955 residents aged three and over, 1022 (0.9%) considered themselves able to speak or read Gaelic.

== Geography ==
=== Geographical location ===
East Ayrshire is located on the west coat of Scotland, sharing borders with the following neighbouring council areas; North Ayrshire, South Ayrshire, Dumfries and Galloway, East Renfrewshire and South Lanarkshire. Blackcraig Hill reaches an elevation of 2,298 feet (700 metres), the highest peak in East Ayrshire. Combining the existing Kilmarnock & Loudoun and Cumnock & Doon Valley government districts offered a simple solution to the issue of giving territory to be administered from Kilmarnock, with the population also roughly balanced with those of Cunninghame and Kyle & Carrick (which became North Ayrshire and South Ayrshire respectively); however, it did mean some settlements historically within Kyle, more closely aligned to Ayr for amenities and which would typically have been described as located in the south of the county – particularly Dalrymple, Drongan, Patna and Dalmellington, the latter of which is 20 miles (32 km) south of Dundonald, South Ayrshire – became politically aligned to the East division.

The local council boasts the proximity to Glasgow, the largest city in Scotland, as a unique selling point for the area. Additionally, the area is said to "combine an idyllic mix of rural beauty and urban living", and being set in the "midst of some of Scotland's finest countryside".

=== Settlements ===
The largest settlements in East Ayrshire.

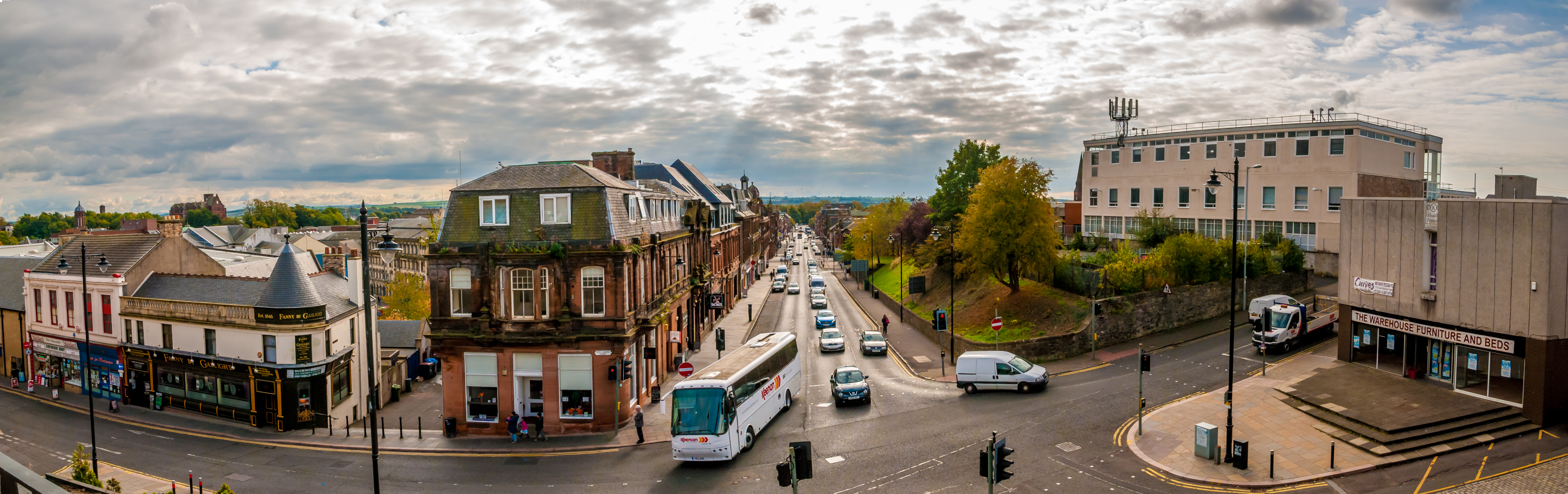
Kilmarnock is the largest settlement in East Ayrshire with a population of over 46,000 and is home to the HQ for East Ayrshire Council

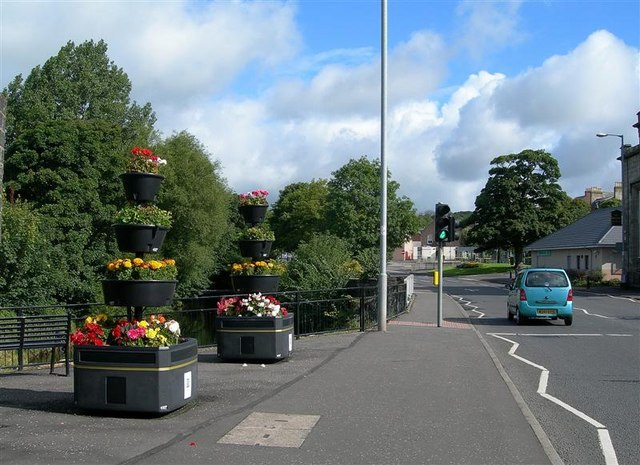
Cumnock is the second largest settlement in East Ayrshire

Kilmarnock is the largest town in East Ayrshire, and has served as the administrative centre of East Ayrshire Council since 1996. It is the East Ayrshire region's main commercial and industrial centre. The town grew considerably during the 1870s and the town's growth subsumed the village of Bonnyton, and by the 1960s, new purpose built suburbs such as New Farm Loch were constructed to accommodate the increasing population of Kilmarnock. By mid–2020, the population of the town was estimated to be 46,970, making Kilmarnock the 14th most populated settlement in Scotland as well as the largest town in Ayrshire by population.

The second largest town in East Ayrshire is Cumnock, which sits at the confluence of the Glaisnock Water and the Lugar Water. There are three neighbouring housing projects which lie just outside the town boundaries, Craigens, Logan and Netherthird, with the former ironworks settlement of Lugar also just outside the town, contributing to a population of around 13,000 in the immediate locale. A new housing development, Knockroon, was granted planning permission on 9 December 2009 by East Ayrshire Council. The town is home to the Robert Burns Academy, a new educational campus housing the main Robert Burns Academy secondary school following the merger of Cumnock Academy and Auchinleck Academy, Lochnorris Primary School and Cherry Trees Early Childhood Centre. The campus is the largest educational establishment in Scotland.

Largest settlements by population:

Settlement	Population (2020)
Kilmarnock	46,970
Cumnock	8,700
Stewarton	7,770
Galston	4,710
Hurlford	4,400
Darvel	3,900
Mauchline	3,900
Auchinleck	3,630
Drongan	3,060
Kilmaurs	2,790

=== Towns and villages ===
- Auchinleck
- Bellsbank
- Bonnyton (former village, now an area of Kilmarnock)
- Burnton
- Catrine
- Chapeltoun
- Coalhall
- Corsehill
- Craigens
- Craigmalloch
- Cronberry
- Crookedholm
- Crosshouse
- Cumnock
- Dalmellington
- Dalrymple
- Darvel
- Drongan
- Dunlop
- Fenwick
- Galston
- Gatehead
- Glenbuck
- Greenholm
- Haugh
- Hurlford
- Kilmarnock
- Kilmaurs
- Knockentiber
- Logan
- Lugar
- Lugton
- Mauchline
- Moscow
- Muirkirk
- Netherthird
- New Cumnock
- Newmilns
- Ochiltree
- Patna
- Polnessan
- Priestland
- Rankinston
- Riccarton
- Sinclairston
- Skares
- Sorn
- Stair
- Stewarton
- Trabboch
- Waterside

== See also ==
- Ayrshire; the geographical area that contains East Ayrshire, North Ayrshire and South Ayrshire
- Kilmarnock; the administrative town of East Ayrshire Council
