= List of castles in East Ayrshire =

This is a list of castles in East Ayrshire, Scotland.

== List ==
Name	Type	Date	Condition	Ownership	Location	Notes	Picture
Aiket Castle	Tower house	Late 15th century	Restored and used as a residence	Private	NS387487 Near Dunlop	See Barony of Aiket	A view of Aiket Castle in 2006.
Auchencloigh Castle	Tower House	15th century	Scant remains	Private	Near Sinclairston		
Barr Castle	Tower house	15th century	In use as a Masonic Lodge with a museum	Masonic Lodge	Galston NS501364	Also known as Lockhart Tower	Barr Castle in 1900
Borland Castle	Tower Castle	15th Century	No remains	Private	Cumnock		
Busbie Castle	Tower house	14th century	Scant remains	Garden of residence	Knockentiber	Demolished in the 1950s	Busbie Castle in 1912
Caprington Castle	Tower house	15th century	Still in use as a residence	Private	Near Kilmarnock NS407362	Extended to form a baronial house in the 1830s	
Carnell Castle	Tower house	15th century	Still in use as a residence and hotel	Private	NS467322	Extended to form a baronial house in 1843	
Cessnock Castle	Tower house	13th century	Restored as a residence	Private	Galston NS510355		
Corsehill Castle	Tower house		Ruined	Private	Stewarton NS416467	See Corsehill, Lainshaw, Robertland and Dunlop	
Craufurdland Castle	Tower house	14th century	Still in use as a residence	Private	Near Kilmarnock NS455407	Extended to form a gothic house in the 19th century	
Dallars Castle	Tower House	15th century	Replaced by a mansion house	Private	Hurlford NS463337	Known for a time as Auchenskeith. Held by the Cuninghams for many years	
Dean Castle	Courtyard Castle	14th century	Restored as a museum	East Ayrshire Council	Kilmarnock NS436394	Restored 1935-6	
Dunlop Castle	Unknown	14th century	No remains	Private	Near Dunlop NS4273749312	Dunlop House is built on the site	
Haining Place	Tower House	16/17th centuries	Vaulted basement survives	Private	Near Kilmarnock NS45253484	Last used as farm workers accommodation	
Kerse Castle		Before 1600	No remains	Craufurd clan	Near Hollybush		Site of Kerse Castle
Kilmaurs Castle		c. 15th century	No remains	Private	Near Jocksthorn Farm, Kilmaurs	Replaced by later Kilmaurs Place	
Kingencleugh Castle	L-plan tower house	17th Century	Ornamental ruins	Private	Near Mauchline	Part of the Kingencleugh House estate	Kingencleugh Castle in 2012
Kyle Castle	Tower castle and barmkin	15th Century	Sparse ruins	Private	Near Muirkirk	Marquis of Bute Estates	Kyle Castle in 2012
Lainshaw Castle			Lainshaw House incorporates part of the old castle	Private	Stewarton	See Corsehill, Lainshaw, Robertland and Dunlop	Lainshaw Castle in 1779
Lefnoreis Castle	Tower Castle	15th Century	Foundations only	Great Steward of Scotland Trust	Cumnock	Sometimes known as Lochnorris	
Loch Doon Castle (Balloch Castle)		Late 13th century (rebuilt 1930s)	Ruined	Historic Scotland			
Loudoun Castle	Courtyard Castle	by the 1820s	Substantial ruins	Private	Near Galston	Destroyed by fire in 1941, formerly known as Windsor of the North, incorporated into a theme park between 1995 and 2010	Loudoun Castle in the 1890s
Mauchline Castle	Tower	15th century	Still standing	Private	Mauchline	Also known as Abbot Hunter's Tower	Mauchline Castle 1790
Martnaham Castle	Tower	4th & 5th centuries (King Coil)	Ruins	Private	On the south-side of Martnaham Loch	http://www.futuremuseum.co.uk/collections/people/key-people/soldiers,-sailors,-rebels-outlaws/king-coil.aspx	
Newmilns Tower	Keep	1530s	Restored and used as a residence	Private	Newmilns NS536373	Restored in 1997 - locally referred to as The Keep	
Polkelly Castle	Tower	14th century	Removed	Private	Near Polkelly Hall	Ruins used to build a road in the 1850s	
Ravenscraig Castle		Before 1604	Ruined			See Corsehill, Lainshaw, Robertland and Dunlop	
Riccarton Castle		Before 1297	No remains			A commemorative plaque is at the fire station	
Robertland Castle	Tower	16th century	The motte and a few stones remain. Robertland House was built from its remains.	Private	Near Stewarton		
Rowallan Castle		16th century	Intact	limited access Historic Scotland	Near Kilmarnock NS43474242	In the grounds of a Golfing development.	
Sorn Castle	Tower house	1409	Expanded 1909, in use as a hotel	Private	NS548269		
Templehouse Fortalice			No remains		Stewarton	See Corsehill, Lainshaw, Robertland and Dunlop	
Terringzean Castle, East Ayrshire		c. 1696	Substantial ruins	Private	Near Auchinleck	In the grounds of Dumfries House	
Trabboch Castle	L-plan Tower House	14th century	Ruin	Private	Near Stair	Much of the stone used to build the nearby farm	

== See also ==
- Castles in Scotland
- List of castles in Scotland
- List of listed buildings in East Ayrshire
