= Lefnoreis Castle =

- Cumnock, East Ayrshire, Scotland; UK grid reference NS 53908 20515
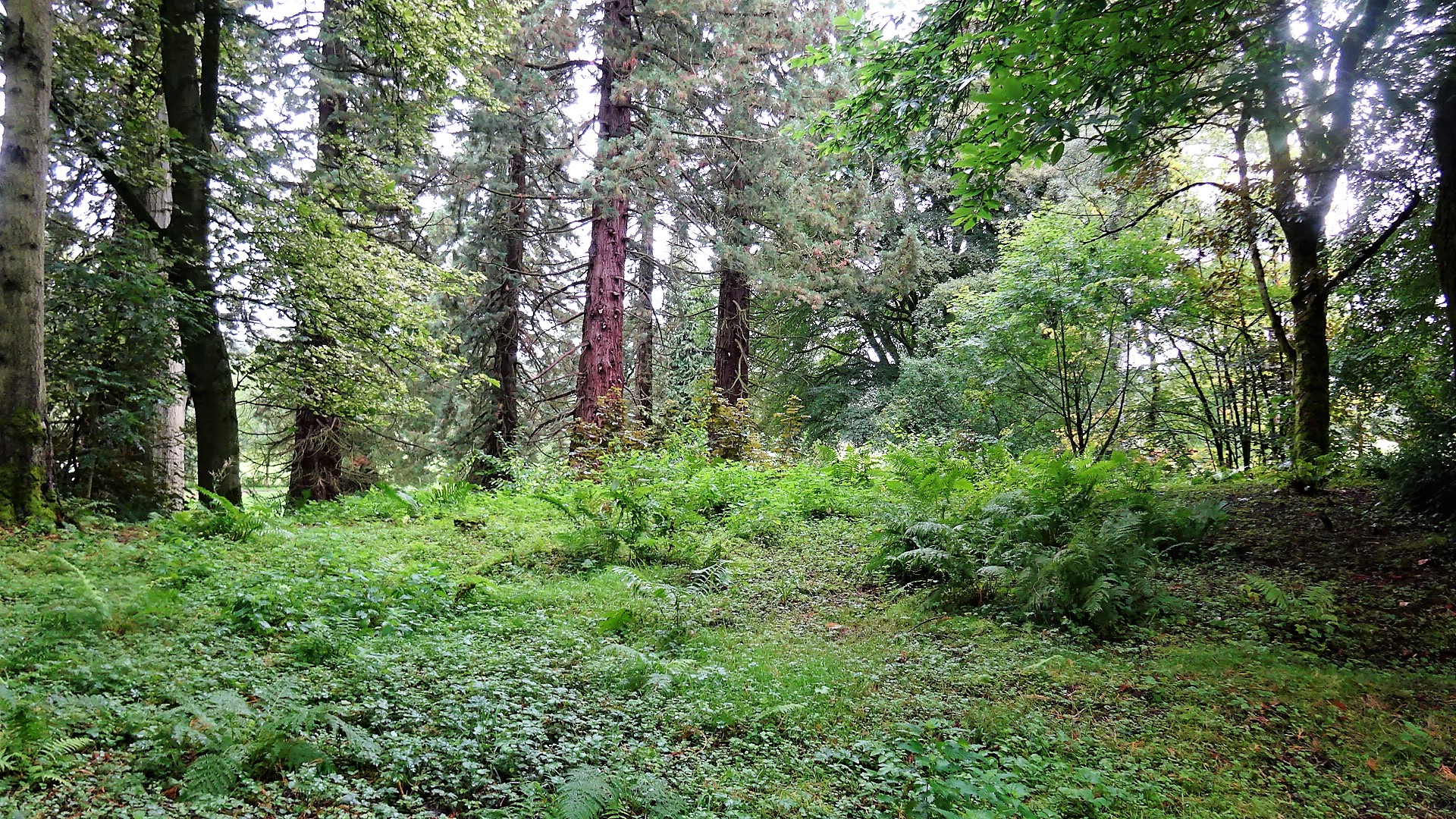
- The site of Lefnoreis or Ward of Lochnorris Castle

Site information
- Type: Tower
- Owner: Great Steward of Scotland Trust
- Open to the public: Yes
- Condition: No remnants

Location
- Lefnoreis Castle
- Coordinates: 55.456614°N 4.3118274°W

Site history
- Built: 13th century
- Built by: Craufurds
- In use: 13th to early 17th century
- Materials: Stone

The site of the old Lefnoreis Castle or Ward of Lochnorris (NS 53908 20515) lies about 100 yards north-west of the old stable block of Dumfries House in East Ayrshire, Parish of Old Cumnock, Scotland. The old castle stood on a natural rise overlooking the Lugar Water, built and held for many years by the Craufurd family. For consistency the spelling Craufurd will be used throughout and Lefnoreis for the castle.

== History ==
Lefnoreis is recorded as being the most important of the three castles in the parish of Old Cumnock, the other two being Borland Castle and Terringzean Castle.

One recorded suggestion in regard of the occupied castle or fortified mansion is that two castles existed, one near the present day stables that was occupied until Dumfries House was built with its foundations still evident in 1885 and another that stood elsewhere on the estate that was abandoned before 1635 and of which no remains survive.

=== The spelling of the placename ===
The name of the fortification is commonly recorded as variations of both Lefnoreis and Lochnorris with the former version more widely used on maps and many other variations in spelling and title, such as the Ward of Lefnorris, Tower of Lefnoreis, Lefnoreise, Ward of Lochnoris, Lochnoreis, Tower of Leifnorris, Liffnoris, Leifnoreis and Lefnoryis.

It is recorded on old maps as Lesno in the mid 17th century, Castle of Lesno in 1654, Lesnoris in 1685 and finally as Lissnorris in 1747-1755. It is also recorded as Craufurdstoun as is the near by Terringzean Castle.

Considerable confusion has arisen in the writing of the castle's name arising from the use of the Long s to represent a lower case s in documents until around 1800 in printed documents and well into the 19th century for written documents. The convention previously being to use a letter similar to an elongated f, leading to a lower case s being easily and often confused and interpreted as an f. On the above mentioned maps this led to Lissnorris for example apparently having the spelling Liffnorris. An actual f had a short horizontal stroke to differentiate it. The intended pronunciation of the name might therefore be closer to Lesnories.

=== Ward ===
It is unusual for the term Ward to be applied to a fortification's name. In Scottish Law a Ward is "..the oldest form of feudal land tenure, viz. by military service, with various attendant rights and obligations, esp. that of the superior to uphold and draw the rents of the lands of a deceased vassal while the heir was uninfeft or remained a minor, as an equivalent for the loss of military services during such period, the usage being termed simple ward. Later commutation was admitted for a monetary payment in lieu of the drawing of rents." This implies that the use of the name Ward only applied to periods in which the male heir was a minor, etc.

== Description of the castle and lands ==
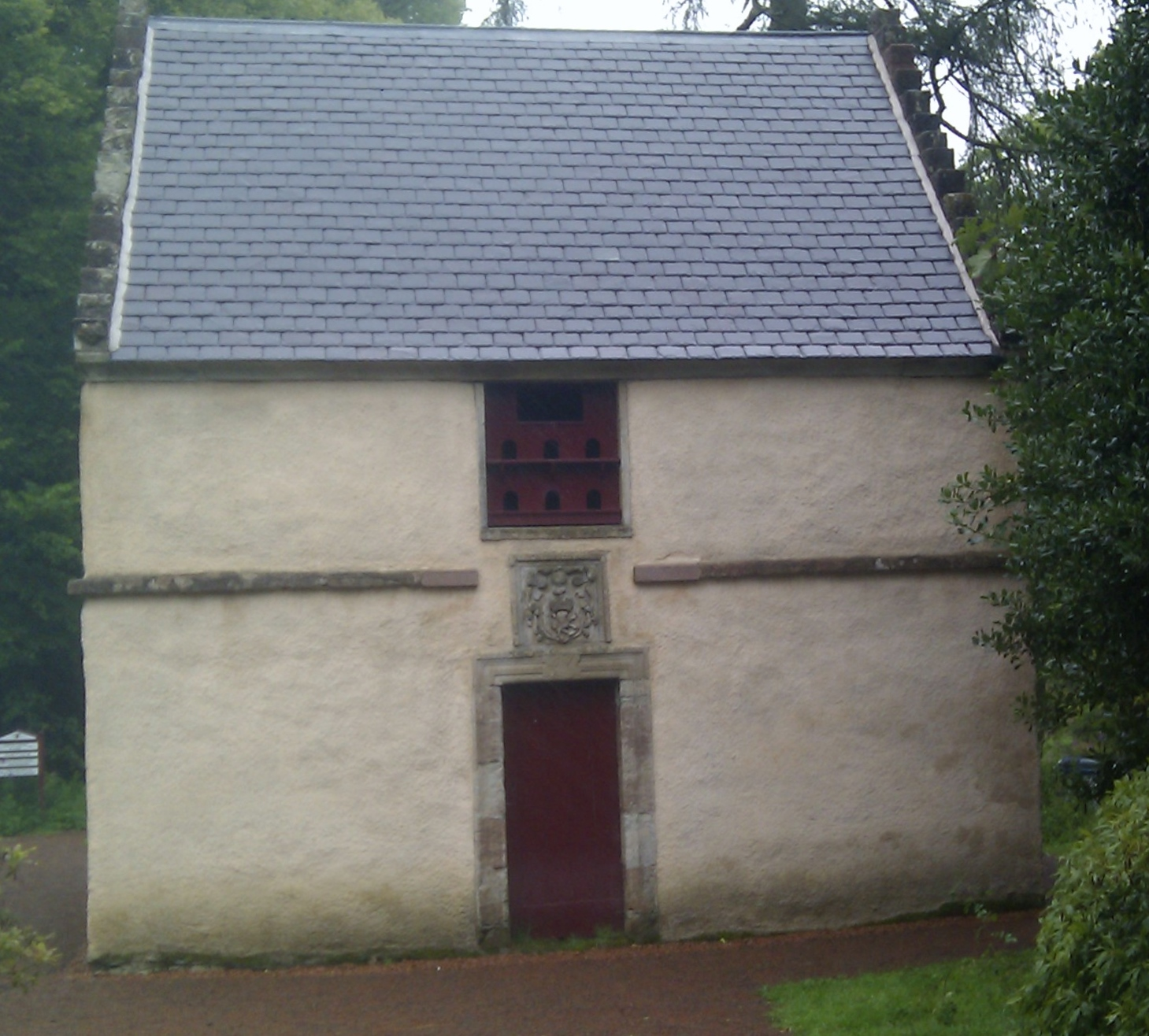
The 1671 Lefnoreis dovecote on the estate pre-dates Dumfries House.

Paterson records that Lefnoreis was a tower known as the 'Ward'. Lord Bute in 1897 carried out extensive excavations at the castle's site and discovered part of the walls of a fortification of considerable strength and also a causeway composed using water-worn stones. In 1885 the foundations had still been visible above ground, the building being demolished circa 1759. The old Lefnoreis walled garden stood near the recently restored Lady's Well (2018) that drains into the Lugar Water.

The 1671 dated dovecote at Dumfries House (NS 53951 20350) is the oldest dated building on the estate and is contemporary with Lefnoreis Castle. Another date of 1851 implies a restoration date. The armorial panel above the doorway is of the McDoualls of Freugh who in 1720 married into the Crichton family.

To the west of the castle site and close to the site of the old Lefnoreis walled garden lies the recently restored Lady's Well (2018) that drains into the Lugar Water. 1756 is the first date recorded for the well although the well's name suggests a pre-reformation date that would make it contemporary with Leifnorris Castle. Until 1944 the well designed by Robert Adam stood as a small square structure with four arched openings and a pyramidal roof.

The Craufurds also held lands in Ochiltree and Dalmellington. The lands of Blackettle and Beauch were part of the lands of Lefnoreis.

== The Lairds of Lefnoreis ==
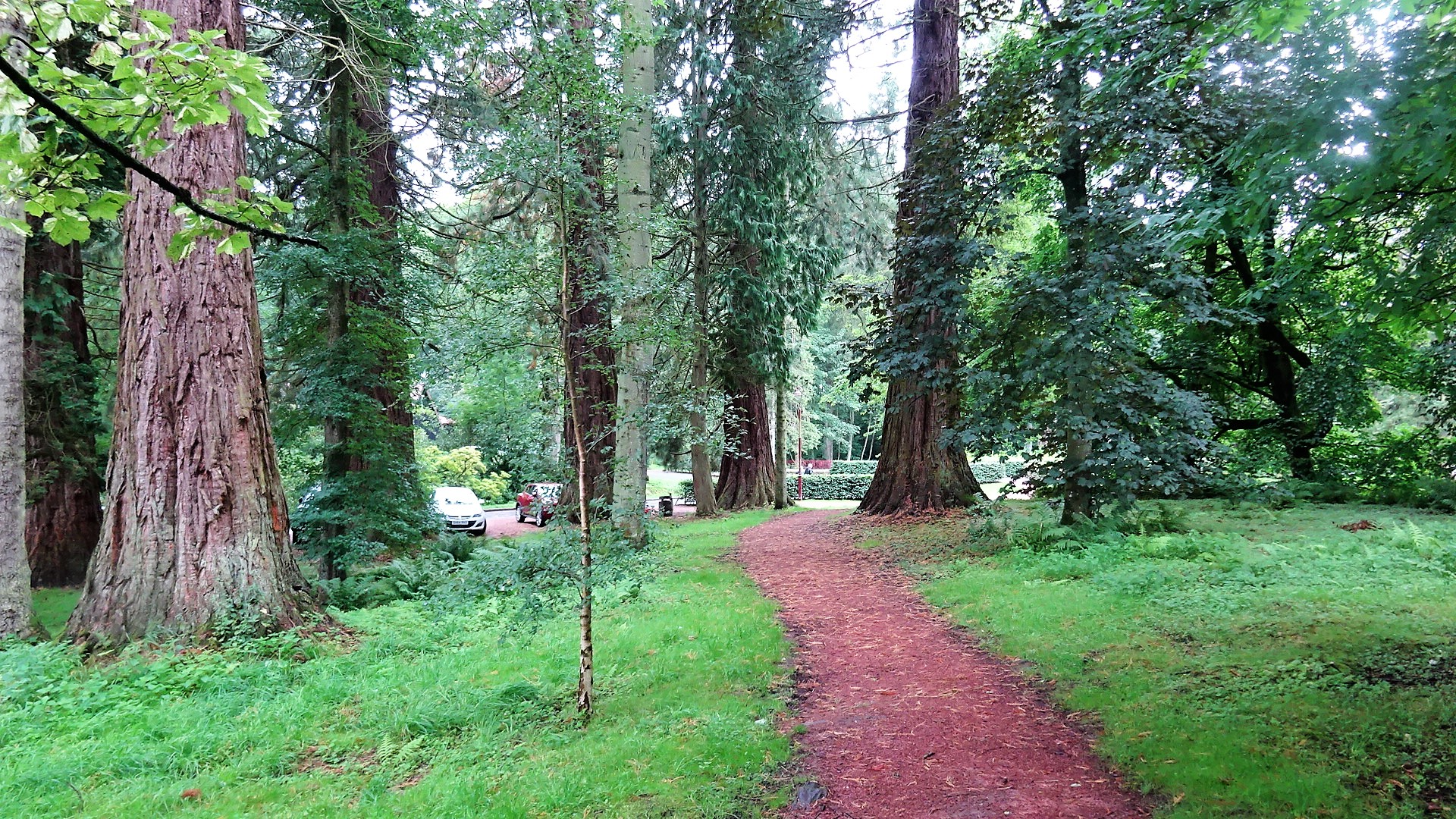
The site of the Lefnoreis Tower from near Dumfries House stables.

Arms of the Craufurds of Lefnoreis:Gules, a fess ermine, in chief two stars or.

The first recorded lairds of Lefnoreis were the Craufurds in 1440, a branch of the Craufurd family of Loudoun Castle near Galston. On the third of October 1528 the laird of Leiffnoris was at Mauchline Castle in the company of the bailie of the Barony of Kylesmuir, Hugh Campbell and the lairds of Ardgowan, Haining, Caprington and Ochiltree. It was the eve of the annual Mauchline Fair.

The estate belonged to the family until 1635 when it was purchased by William, 2nd Earl of Dumfries. His heiress, Penelope, married the second son of the 1st Earl of Stair and the Dumfries title passed into the Dalrymple family. The Crichton-Stuarts, Marquesses of Bute inherited Dumfries House and estate.

The coat of arms of the Craufurds of Lefnoreis was "Gules, a Fess Ermine, and in Chief, two Stars. Or." This translates from heraldic terminology as a shield with a red background with a band of ermine running horizontally across and two gold stars above the horizontal band.

== Historical incidents ==
William Craufurd in 1510 was involved in the taking back of Loch Doon Castle from the Kennedy Clan. In 1512 the same William was involved in the murder of the laird of Corsintoune (sic) at Cumnock Church. This may refer to Coursington near Motherwell. In 1527 George Craufurd accompanied the Campbells of Loudoun in the ambush that led to the death of the Earl of Cassillis at Prestwick.

In 1544 John Knox records that George Craufurd of Lefnoreis opposed the Scottish Protestant Reformation and joined the Bishop of Glasgow in attempting to prevent George Wishart, later a Protestant martyr, from preaching in Ayr. In doing so he stood against the Earl of Glencairn's and his supporters. In 1566 Knox records that the new Craufurd laird was a supporter of Protestantism.

In 1550 Agnes Craufurd, the Lady of Lefnoreis, was abducted and carried away for some time by fellow Craufurds. It seems that her husband had died without an heir and following the abduction a George Craufurd inherited the lands and castle.

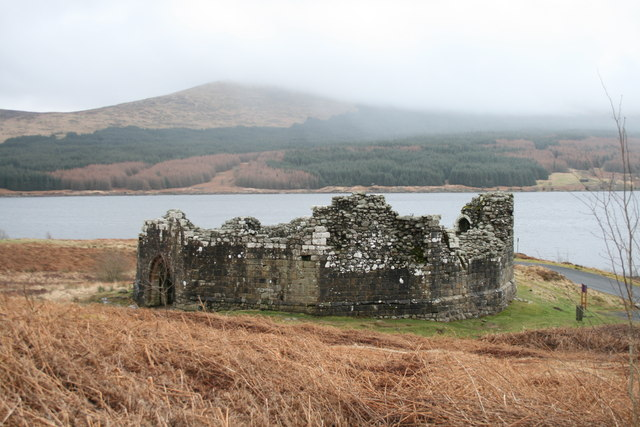
Loch Doon Castle was taken from the Kennedy Clan by William Craufurd of Lefnoreis.

In 1578 George Craufurd of Lefnoreis was fined £2000 for allowing James Elliot, an infamous border's reiver, to escape from his custody at the castle. In 1609 another George Craufurd of Lefnoreis was imprisoned in Blackness Castle for bearing arms and assisting fugitives. In 1560 and 1572 George Craufurd sat in the Scottish parliament and in 1589 William Craufurd was appointed as a commissioner to ensure that all Jesuits were to leave the country for a month.

In 1606 two servants of George Craufurd of Lefnoreis, George and Andrew McCubene, claimed that John and George Hervie of Skellingtoun Mill attacked them at the Cumnock Market, putting them in fear of their lives. The court took the view that the McCubenes were the aggressors even though the McCubenes had suffered physical injuries during the affray.

In 1608 the Privy Council of Scotland issued an order that the Cunninghames of Caprington, Dalkeith and Auchincors were not to meet at Cumnock Church as violence was foreseen. The families were in dispute and elsewhere murders had taken place on the sabbath at churches. William Cunninghame of Caprington and his son and the laird of Lefnoreis and his son were to refrain from meeting with their men at the church or suffer a large fine, the order remaining in force until 1 April 1609.

== Dumfries House ==
William Dalrymple, 5th Earl of Dumfries, was responsible for commissioning John, Robert and James Adam to design and build Dumfries House between 1754–59, the old castle then being abandoned and the stone removed.

== See also ==
- Hugh Crawford (sheriff)
- Crawford Castle
- Giffordland, Ayrshire A cadet branch of the Craufurds of Craufurdland
- List of castles in East Ayrshire
