= Lands of Borland, Barony of Cumnock =

Coordinates: 55.4302°N 4.2354°W

Lands of Borland
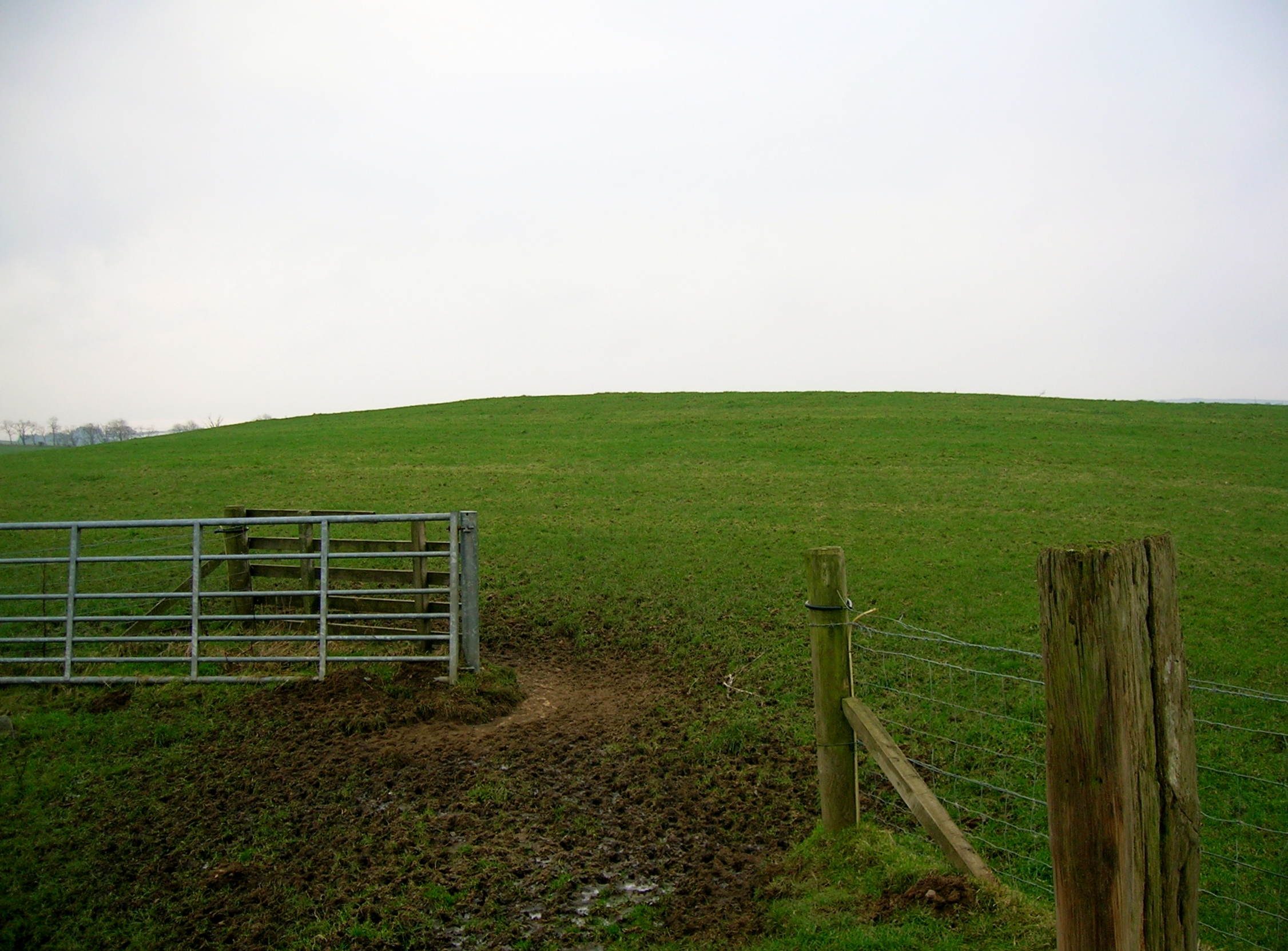
- The site of Borland Castle

- Location within East Ayrshire
- Council area: East Ayrshire
- Lieutenancy area: Ayrshire
- Country: Scotland
- Sovereign state: United Kingdom
- Post town: Kilmarnock
- Police: Scotland
- Fire: Scottish
- Ambulance: Scottish

The Lands of Borland or Boreland (NS 5864 1742) formed a castle and land holdings within the old Barony of Cumnock, East Ayrshire, Parish of Old Cumnock, Scotland. Lying two miles south of Cumnock, the property was mainly held by a cadet branch of the Hamilton family from around 1400 before passing by marriage to the Montgomeries and others. For consistency the spelling 'Borland' will be used throughout.

== History ==
It is a little unusual for the name 'Borland' to be associated directly with a castle as a 'Boor' was a serf and Norman lords often apportioned lands near their castles for their servants. Borland or Bordland could also mean the mensal land that was granted to the feudal superior specifically to be used to furnish food for his castle or dwelling. Linking the name to 'wild boar' is a more fanciful association that is occasionally inferred when such a placename exists. The Dumfries Road used to run through Borland Smithy and close to the castle site, but now runs slightly to the east with the line of the old road still visible. The castle was one of three in the parish of Old Cumnock, the others being Lefnoreis Castle and Terringzean.

== The castle and estate ==
The castle or fortified manor house lay on an area of slightly raised ground between the old Borland Smithy (East Borland Farm) and Borland Mill. No remains are visible on the site as the farmer removed the remaining walls previous to 1855, although some of the foundations although stones are still sometimes struck during ploughing and part of the old moat was visible in the 19th century situated close to the Borland Burn that was ideally located to fill it. The farmer in 1855 referred to it as Borland House, but it is recorded as a ruined castle on several maps up until 1821.

Close to the castle site is the sand and gravel hillock known as the Castle Hill or Knowe. Several gravel pits have obscured what may have been a moat and this site could have been the site of a fort or a castle mound.

In 1939 archaeological excavations revealed a wood lined shaft in the north-west side of the sandpit and a fragment of a medieval jug was discovered within, raising the suggestion that this site had been used as a kitchen-refuse dump for Borland Castle.

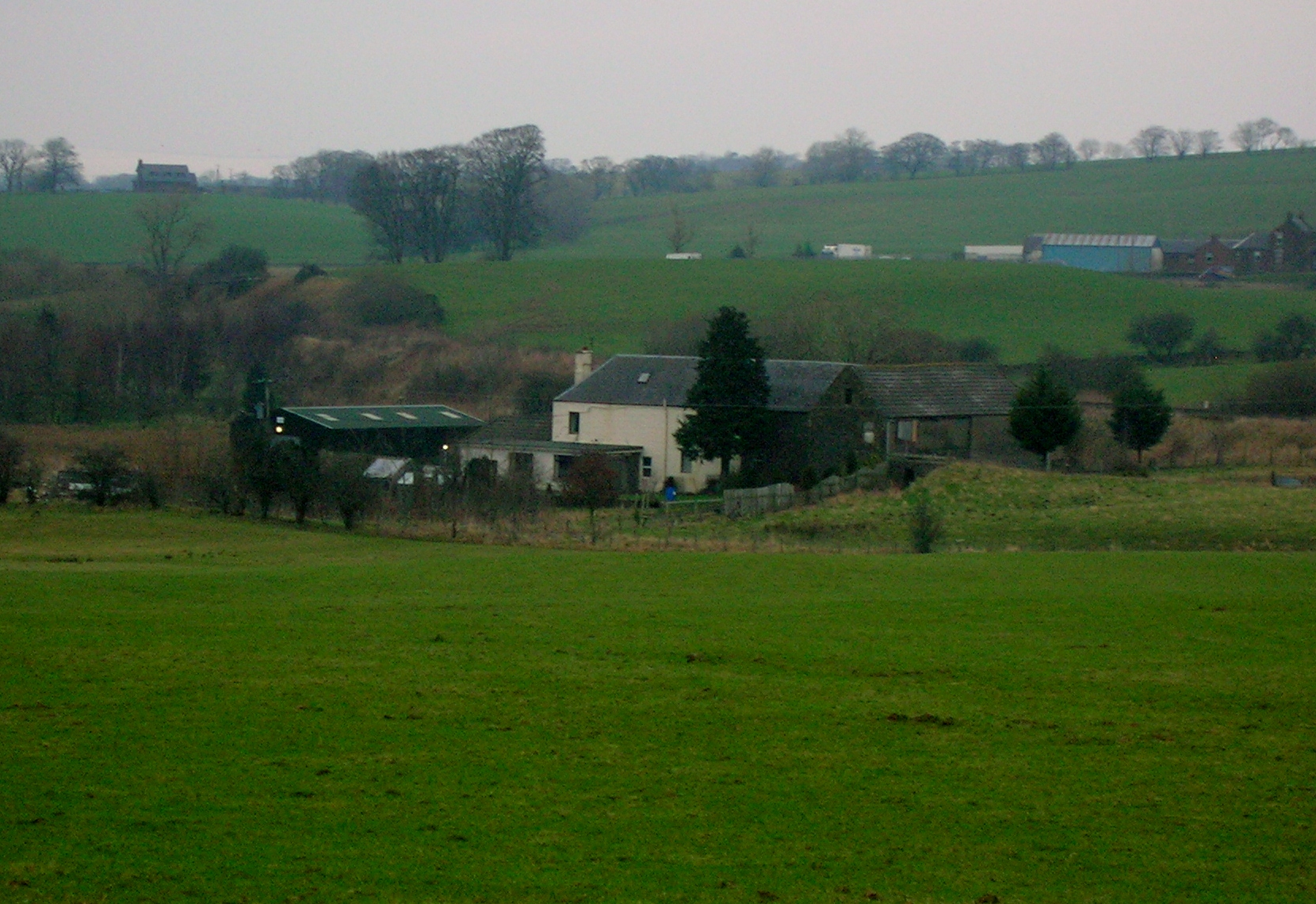
Borland Mill

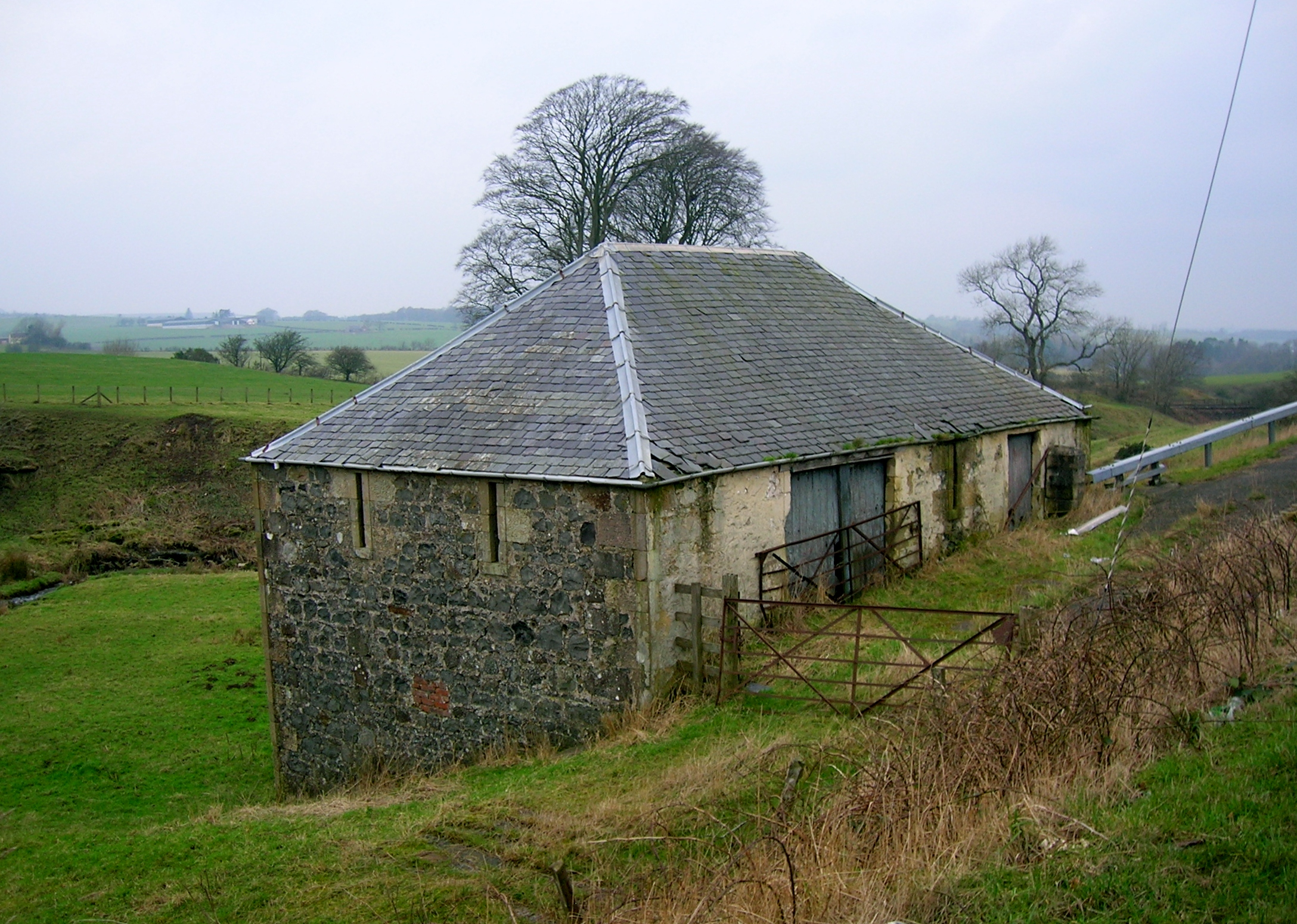
The old sawmill opposite Borland Mains Farm

The kitchen of East Borland Farm holds a stone located over the fireplace, presently hidden under interior decoration, that was recovered from the old castle and carved upon it are to the left the initials H. M. and on the right M. H. with the date 1677 in the centre. This relic is roughly three foot long and six inches in height. These initials are those of Hugh Montgomerie of Prestwickshaws and his bride Margaret Hamilton.

Various other names are recorded including Burland, Boirlandis, Boirdland, Borlandis and Brodland.

In 1611 Towlach, Garlaffen and Sandochhill were part of the Lands of Borland within the Barony of Cumnock. At the time of Hugh Hamilton the Lands of Borland consisted of the following properties that were inherited by his grand-daughter Margaret Hamilton in 1699 and formed her dowry:- Borland, Sannochhill, Smidieland, Rhyderstoun, Netherton, Midton, Watson, Borland Head, Borland Muir, Stay, Calloch Hill and Roddinghead.

Borland Mill may have been the mill of the Lands of Borland and is shown as the Smithy Mill in 1832, otherwise the Borland name is used. Being fed by the Black Loch it would have had a reliable water supply.

=== Borland Chapel ===
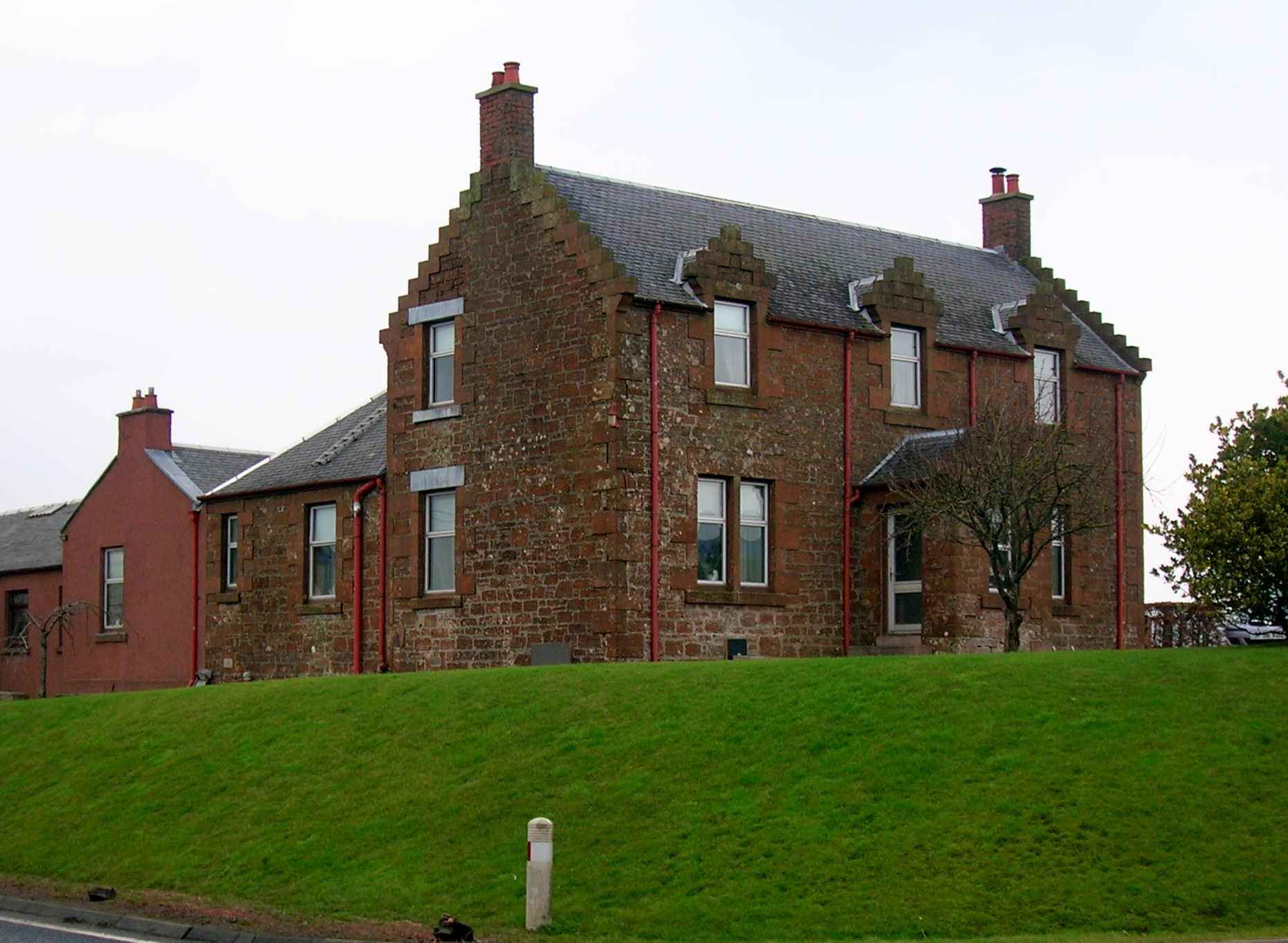
Borland Mains Farm

The Lands of Borland are recorded as having possessed a pre-reformation chapel (NS594173) on the now demolished farm of Chapel House. In circa 1636-52 a Boirland church/chapel site is clearly shown on Robert Gordon's map. The 1857 OS map shows the site of the chapel. Borland Chapel is recorded by John Smith as lying near to the castle.

The name 'Hallow Chapel' has also been used and ruins were still visible in 1837 but robbed out by 1899. A carved stone from this site, carved with concentric circles was built into the west wall of the old Chapel farmhouse. It was recorded that human bones and skulls were found during ploughing and this may indicated the presence of a burial ground. The site of the farm and chapel have been significantly altered by farming activities.

=== The Black Loch ===
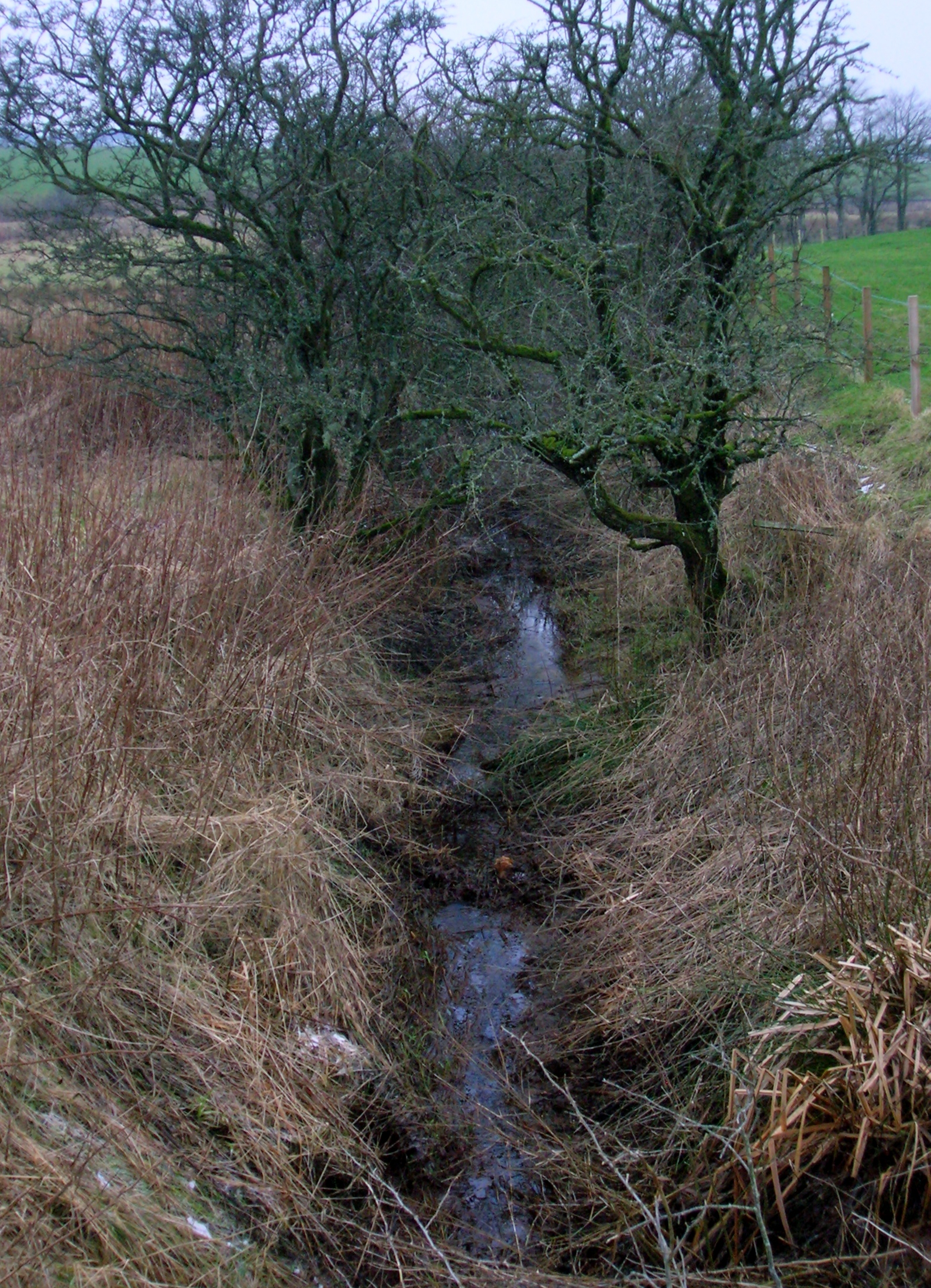
The old lade running from the Black Loch to Borland Mill

This loch lay within the Lands of Borland, held by the Hamilton family since circa late 14th to early 15th centuries. It is one of the very few bodies of water that have an outflow running in two different directions. Fanciful imagination has pictured a trout swimming up the River Ayr, passing into the Lugar Water at Barskimming, entering the Black Loch via the Glaisnock Water and thence into the Black Loch. The second outflow from the loch would carry the trout into Creoch Loch, then into the Loch o' th' Lowes, the River Nith and finally into the Solway Firth after a journey of around seventy miles.

=== Lairds ===
Around the year 1400 a cadet branch of the Hamilton family came into possession of the lands of Borland. In 1551 George Hamilton and his son John were granted a 'Deed of Remission' by the Privy Council for "..syding with the Earl of Lennox." at the Battle of the Butts that had been fought in 1543 at the Gallowmuir close to Glasgow. This amounted to a pardon for fighting on the side of Mathew Stewart, 4th Earl of Lennox, actually a traditional enemy of the Hamiltons, against James Hamilton, 2nd Earl of Arran and Duke of Chatelherault, Regent of Scotland, a Catholic and anti-reformer.

The location of the Lands of Borland, East Ayrshire

A George Hamilton of Borland, married to Janet, daughter of Keith of Galston, was the second son of Sir David Hamilton of Cadzow. The family held the lands until in 1669 Hugh Hamilton of Borland left the lands to his grand-daughter Margaret, the heiress of this cadet branch of the family. Hugh Montgomerie of Prestwickshaws, a descendant of the Eglinton Montgomeries, married Margaret and sold his lands of Prestwickshaws to one Robert Wallace.

In 1577 a John Hamilton was murdered by John Turnbull of Kelsis. In 1611 William Hamilton inherited Borland from his father Patrick and in 1616 a Hugh Hamilton, with in 1650 a John Hamilton of Borland also recorded.

The Montgomeries of Borland held these lands until 1751 when the property passed to the Montgomeries of Coilsfield who together with McAdam of Waterhead were trustees and sold the lands to various parties. In 1790 the lands were purchased by the Earl of Dumfries; however, by the 1860s, the lands were owned by the Marquis of Bute.

William Montgomerie succeeded his father Hugh and married Anne Hamilton of Letham and in 1711 was a Commissioner of Supply for Ayrshire. John was the son of this William and became a collector of taxes did not live at Borland due to the sale of the lands by his father.

== Cartographic evidence ==
The Blaeu's 1654 map only indicates an important site named 'Boirland'. Moll's map appears to show Borland close to the river without naming it. Roy's military survey of 1747 only shows a 'Borland' site with a group of buildings within an enclosure and two groups of buildings nearby. Armstrong, Andrew in 1775 records only records the site of 'Borlands'. Taylor and Skinner's 1776 maps mark the 'Ruins of Borland Castle' lying close to the 38 mile stone on the Dumfries Road. Ainslie's map of 1821 records only a Borland Castle lying close to the Borland Burn. In 1832 Thomson's map shows a Borland with a Smithy Mill and dwellings marked as Chapel, Netherton and Midton. A Borland Mains is shown some distance to the west of Borland. In 1857 the Dumfries Road still ran through Borland Smithy and the site of Borland Castle is clearly marked close to the site named Castle Hill that lies next to the main line railway. Borland Mill was still in use as a corn mill and the timber mill is shown opposite Borland Mains, close to the Borland Burn although a water supply is not shown. The site of the chapel is shown.

== Micro-history ==
At Borland Smithy, now East Borland Farm, a fine felstone celt was found with an oblique cutting edge. Fine ornamented clay whorls and urn fragments have also been found. In 1898 two sepulchral urns were found in the Castle Knowe.

== See also ==
- Creoch Loch
- Loch o' th' Lowes, New Cumnock
- Lefnoreis Castle
- Terringzean Castle, East Ayrshire
