= Terringzean Castle =

Ruined castle in East Ayrshire, Scotland

- Cumnock, East Ayrshire, Scotland; GB grid reference NS255564, 620506
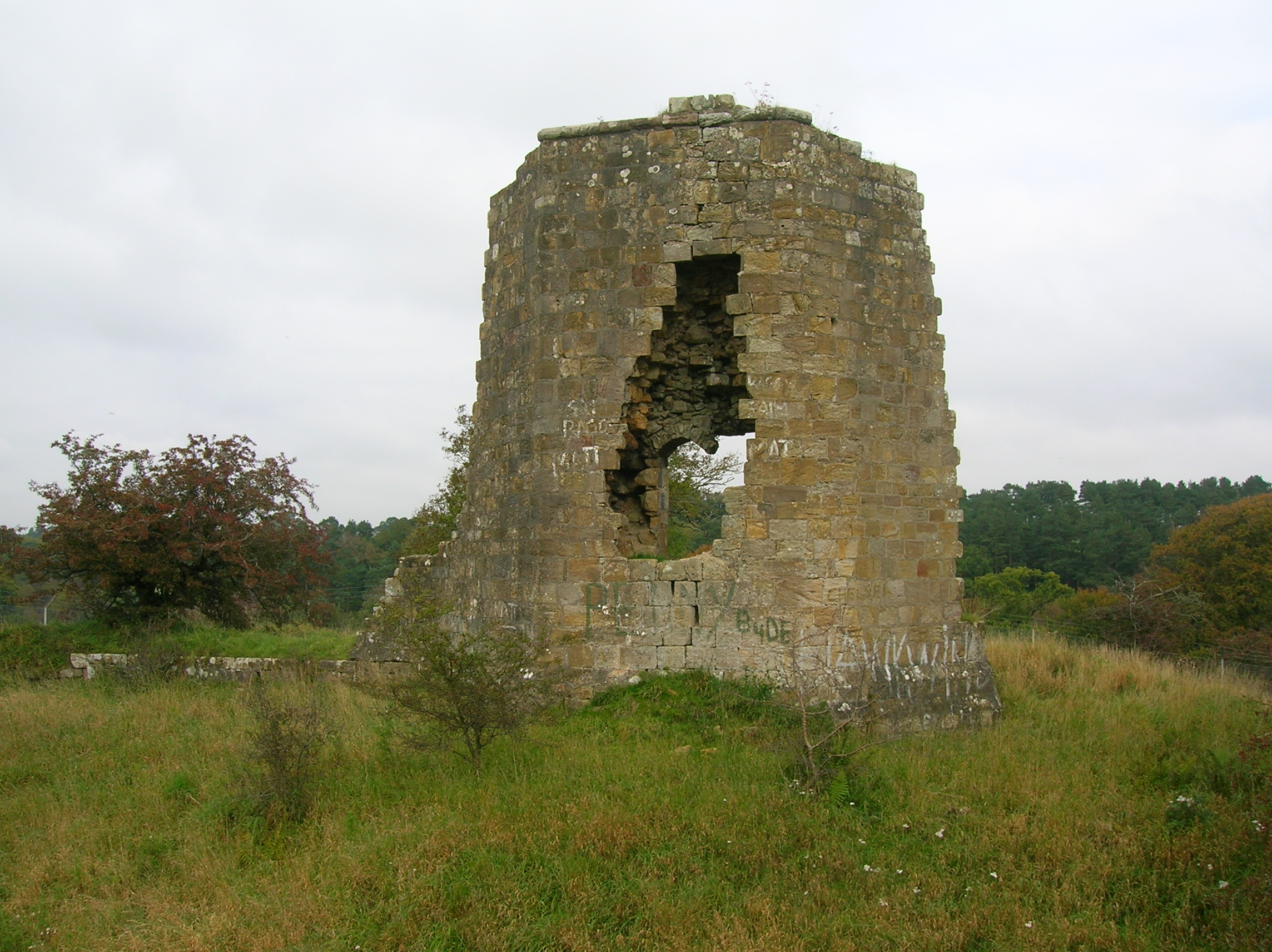
- Terringzean Castle from the west

Site information
- Owner: Private
- Open to the public: No
- Condition: Ruin

Location
- Shown within Scotland
- Coordinates: 55°27′25″N 4°17′08″W

Site history
- Built: Circa 1696
- Built by: Campbells of Loudoun
- In use: 18th century
- Materials: Stone

Terringzean Castle, also Taringzean, pronounced "Tringan", is a Category B listed castle ruin lying above the River Lugar and the Terringzean Holm in the policies of Dumfries House, Parish of Cumnock, Scotland. The name Craufordstone or Craufurdstoun, has also been used, echoing that it and these lands originally belonged to the Crawfords, as did Lefnoreis Castle or Lochnorris Castle which once stood near the site of the Dumfries House stables.

== History ==
The knoll on which Terringzean Castle stands was covered with hawthorn trees in the 1890s. The spelling of the castle site has many variations, such as "Trarizeane", "Trarinyean", "Terrinzeane", "Terringane", "Trarynyane", "Terrynyene", "Torrinzeane", etc.

=== Castle structure and aspect ===
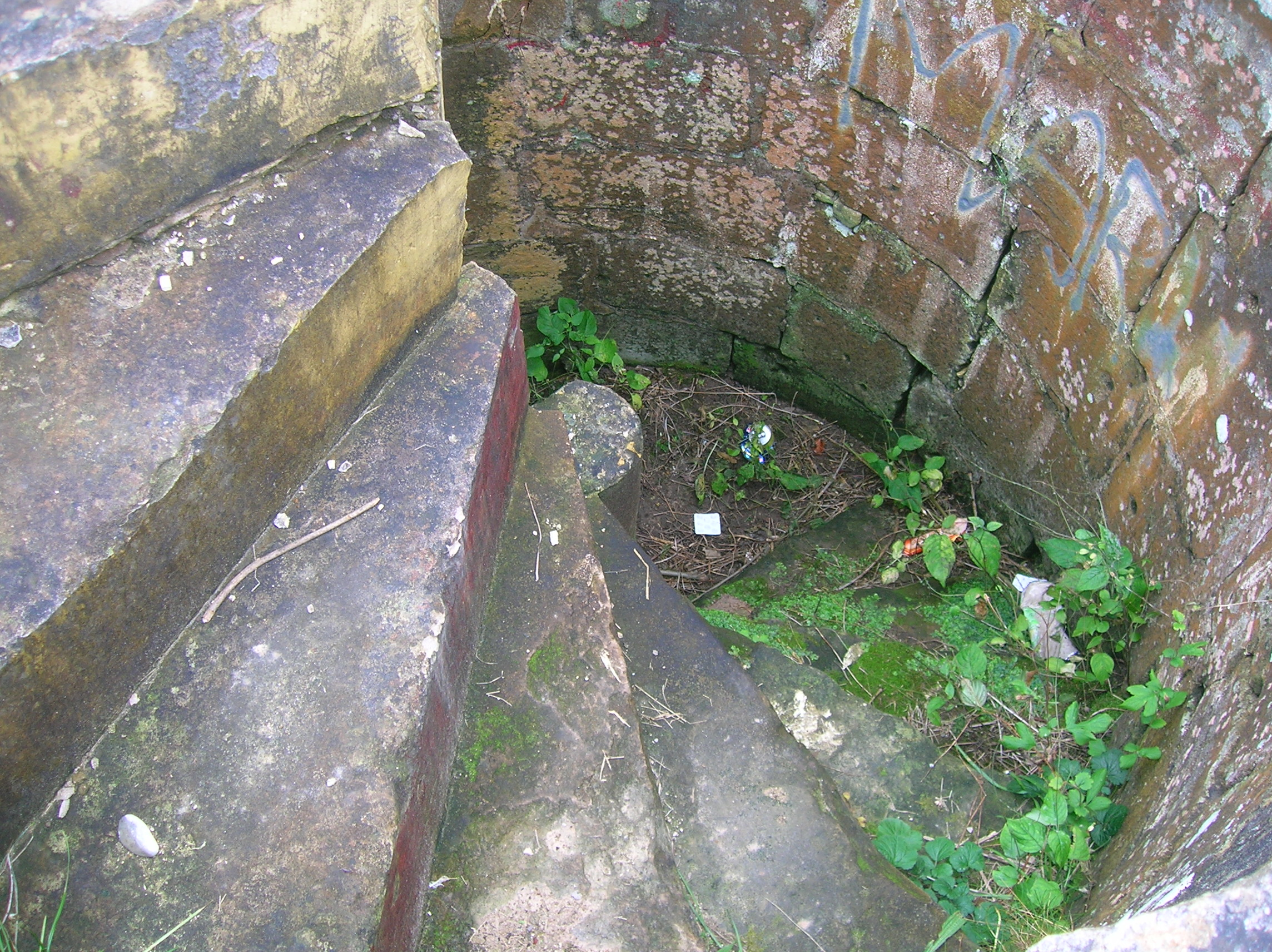
The surviving part of the wheel-stair.

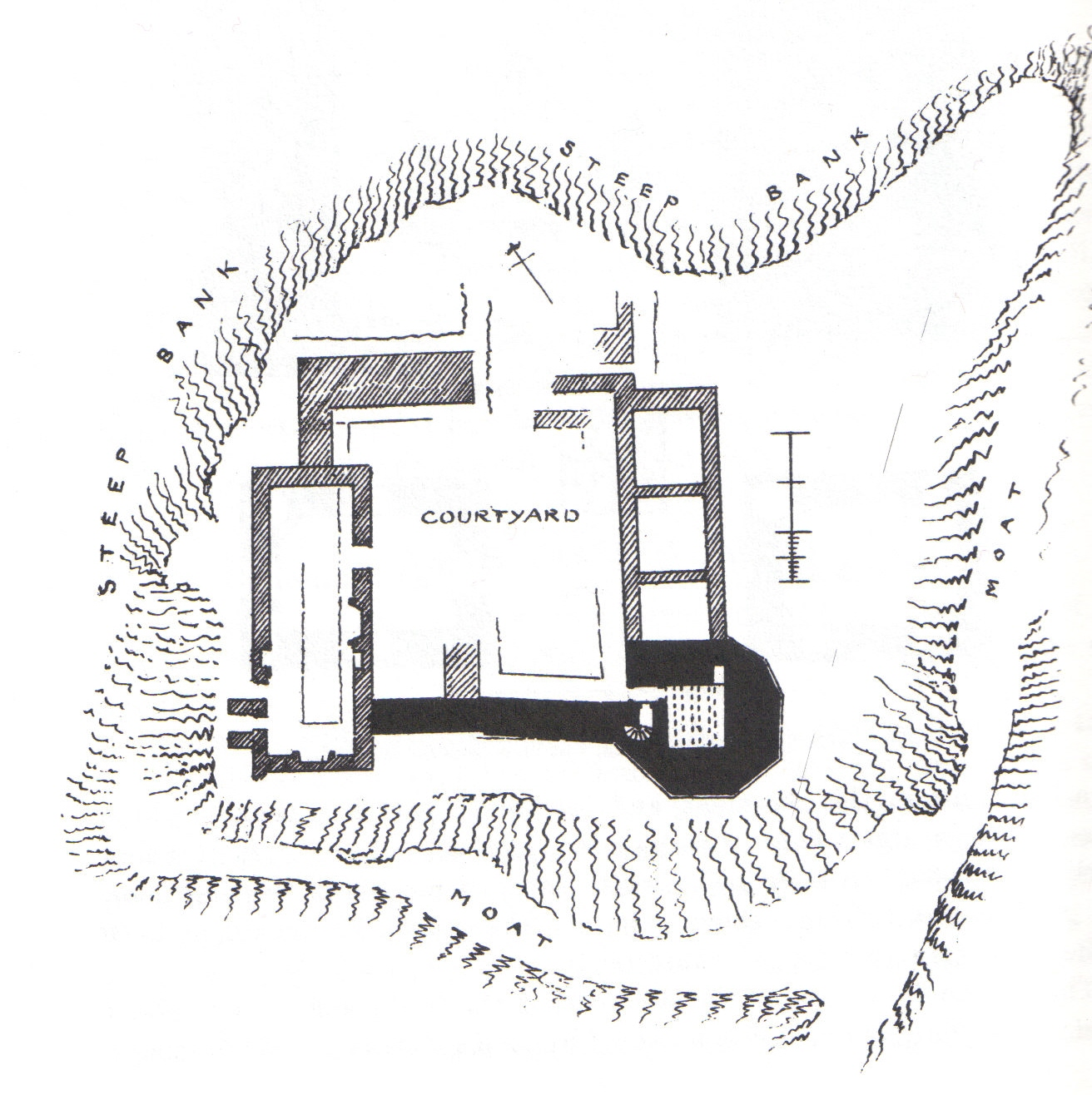
A plan of the castle.

Terringzean Castle occupies the summit of a high, steep bank overlooking the Lugar Water and the Terringzean Holm; a dry moat ending at the steep natural haughs or slopes, is still clearly visible as a protective measure against approach from the level ground to the south-east and south-west. The moat's appearance is mainly due to the excavations carried out by the 3rd Lord Bute in the 1890s.

The small, irregular, octangular 14th-century vaulted tower has a splayed base and is constructed of courses of square ashlar masonry, 6 m (20 ft) high, with walls 2 metres (6.6 ft) thick, is the earliest part of the structure, together with the wide wall at the north-west. The tower was vaulted, with three ribs, and an entrance from the courtyard via a narrow passage leading to a partly surviving wheel-stair. The remains of outbuildings lie to the north and a well was recorded within the keep; a sizeable courtyard lay within the complex. The remains have seen some restoration and the lines of excavation trenches are apparent. The whereabouts of the records of the late 19th-century excavations is not known for certain.

The ruins suggest a 'castle of enceinte' like Loch Doon Castle with a massive walled enclosure. A medieval hall house existed before this walled enclosure, possibly of a 13th-century date, indicating that an even earlier fortification may have been present. MacGibbon and Ross saw similarities between the tower of Terringzean and that of Mugdock Castle.

== The Lairds of Terringzean ==
=== The Craufurds ===
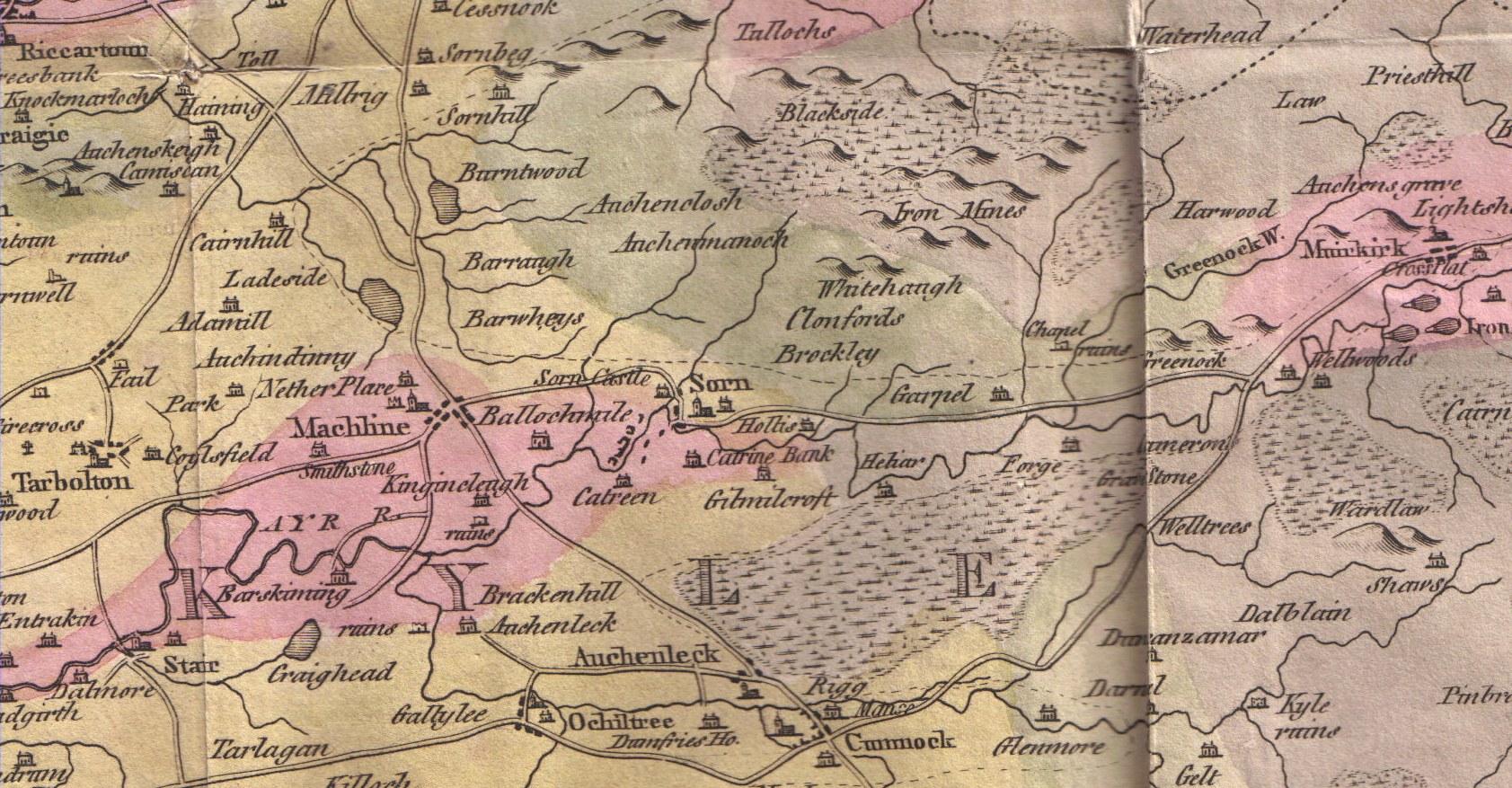
William Aiton's map of the area, circa 1811

The earliest known reference to Terringzean dates from the Exchequer Rolls in 1438, making however no mention of the castle, when £14 Scots was paid in tax from the lands to support the royal household.

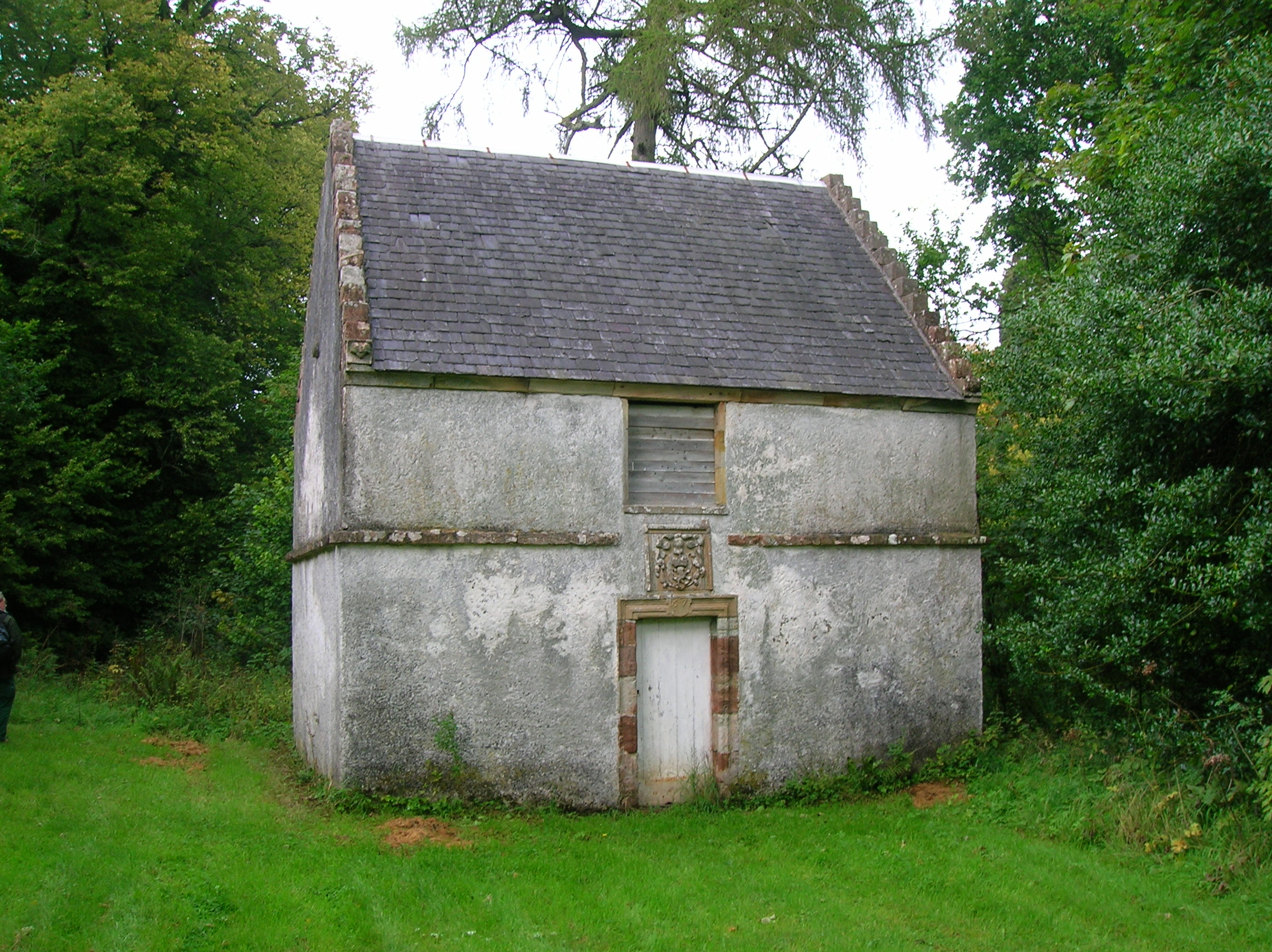
Old dovecot at Dumfries House, dated 1671.

The Barony, castle and lands of Terringzean have a complex history of possession, with the Craufurds, also Crawfurd, being the first recorded. This family had an armorial bearing of a Stag's Head and may have been descended therefore from the Craufurds of Dalmagregan. They also and separately held Lefnoreis Castle, now the location of Dumfries House with only the dovecot surviving from the old castle. The family had ceased to hold Terringzean by 1467, the lands having passed to Thomas Boyd, Earl of Arran. At this time it is referred to as 'Craufuirdstone, alias Terringzeane' The Terringzean Craufurds were relatives of Sir William Wallace's mother.

=== Boyds ===
Thomas Boyd, Earl of Arran fell out of favour with King James III, despite his having been married to Princess Mary, the King's sister. The lands passed to the King due to this forfeiture in 1469, these lands were to belong to the first born princes of the Kings of Scotland. In 1488 one Thomas Turnbull was granted the castle in recognition of his good services at Blackness in 1488.

=== Ramsays ===
In 1488 Sir John Ramsay de Trarinzeane (sic) held the life-rent of the castle and lands. He sat in parliament and was a great friend of King James III, spared however when the nobles executed the friends of the king at the "Raid of Lauder". He was once Lord of Bothwell and was the ancestor of the Balmain family. William Ramsay of Balmain was granted the lands in 1534.

=== Campbells ===
In 1546, Hugh Campbell, Earl of Loudoun held the lands upon their resignation by one John Campbell of Bruntswood. Hugh Campbell held them in 1587 and may have represented a cadet line of the Campbells of Loudoun. In 1621 Sir John Campbell and his wife Margaret Campbell acquired the lands from his wife's father, the Master of Loudoun.

=== Crichton-Stuarts ===
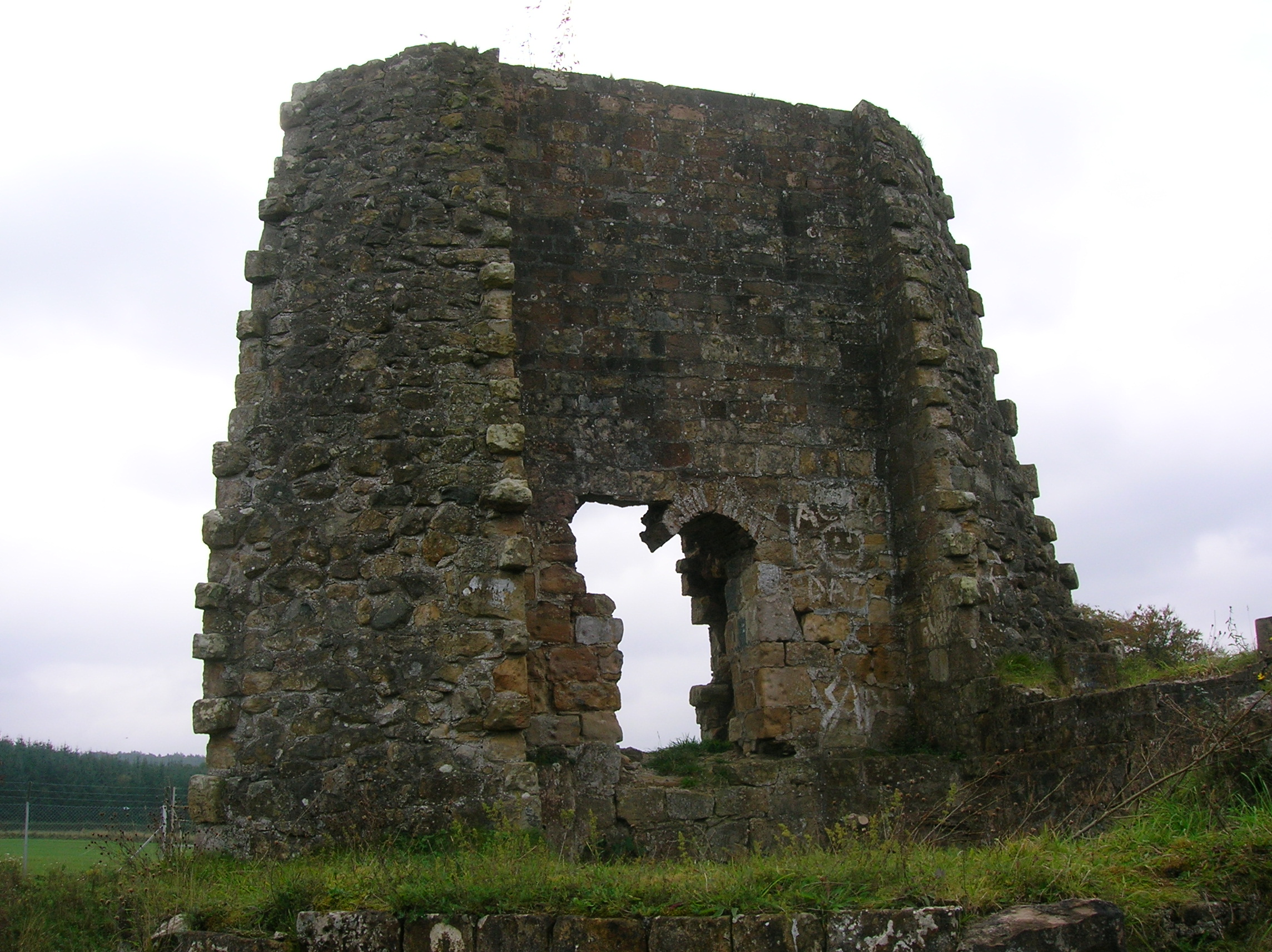
The tower from the south-east.

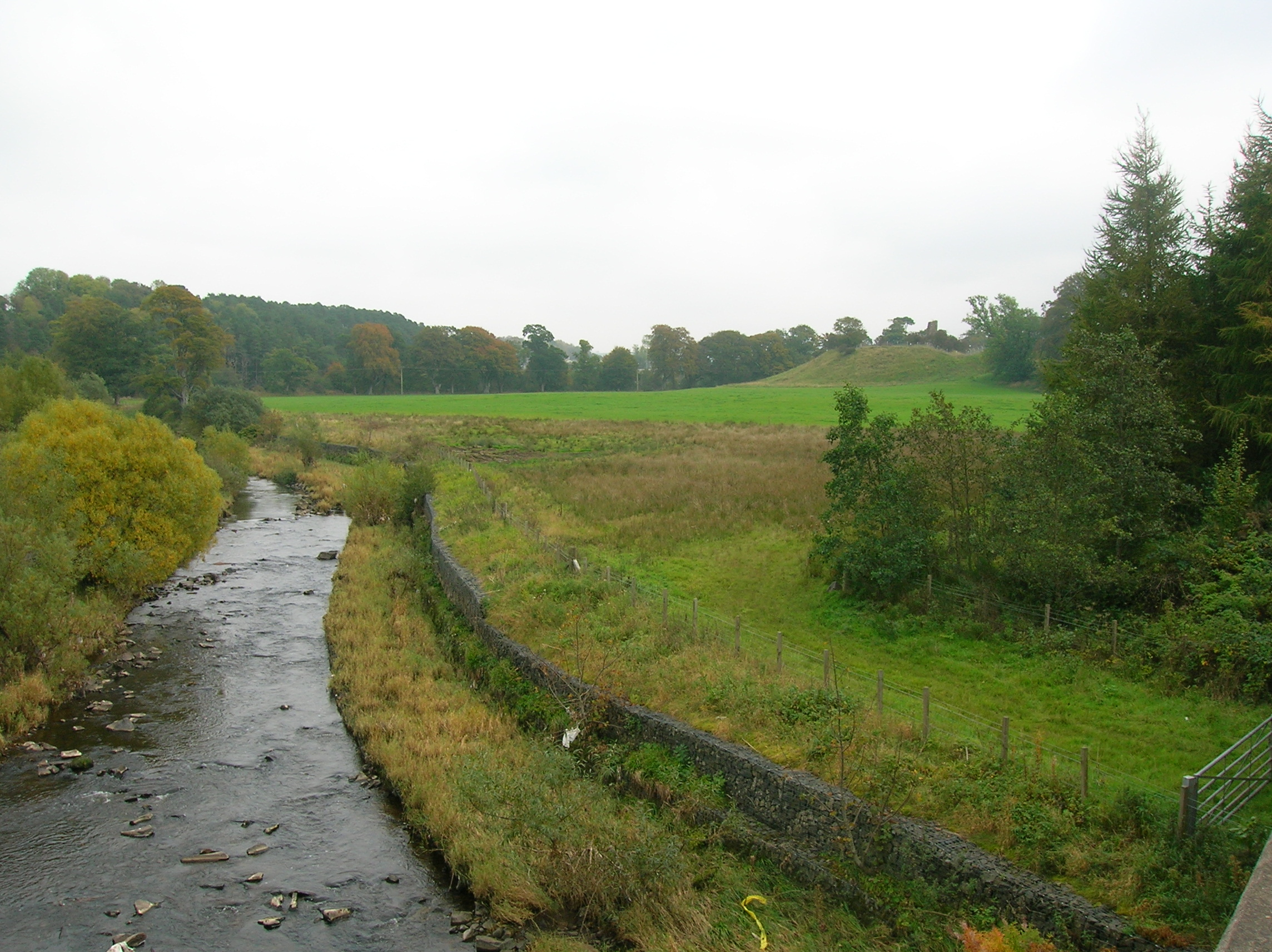
The castle and mound from the Lugar Water

The Crichton-Stuarts, Earls of Dumfries acquired these lands and the castles of Craufuirdstone and Lochnorris from the Campbells of Loudoun in the person of Sir Matthew Campbell, father-in-law, who sold the lands to Lord Dumfries in 1696. The Earl of Loudoun still holds the subsidiary title of Lord Taringzean.

=== Other lairds ===
Other holders were Hugh Montgomerie of Bridgend in 1647; in 1666, James Reid, merchant burgess of Edinburgh; in 1691, Sir George Campbell of Cessnock; in 1692, Sir James Carmichael, Bart., as heir of Sir James Carmichael of Bonington; in 1696, John, Viscount Stair and then the Earls of Dumfries, who became the Marquis of Bute.

=== Present day ===
In 2007 a consortium, led by the Prince of Wales, including various heritage charities and the Scottish Government, purchased from the 7th Marquess, Dumfries House, along with its roughly 2,000-acre (8.1 km^{2}) estate).

== Micro-history ==
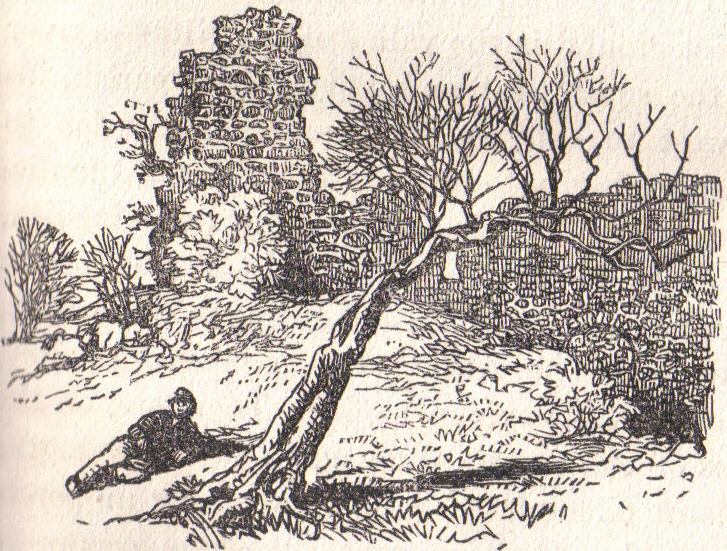
Terringzean Castle ruins in 1863.

In 1587 Hew Campbell of Terringane (sic) and others were appointed by parliament to "visie" or inspect the bridges at Irvine and Ayr; in 1595 he was appointed to inspect the port and harbour of Irvine.

A "Torringan" is marked on William Roy's map of 1747–55, together with nearby woodlands, all situated near the extensive landscaping of the lands of "Liffnoris". Armstrong's map of 1775 shows the site of Terringzean Castle as a ruin.

"The Avenue" was an entrance to Dumfries House which ran past Terringzean Castle from Cumnock.
