= Dumfries House =

Palladian country house in Ayrshire, Scotland

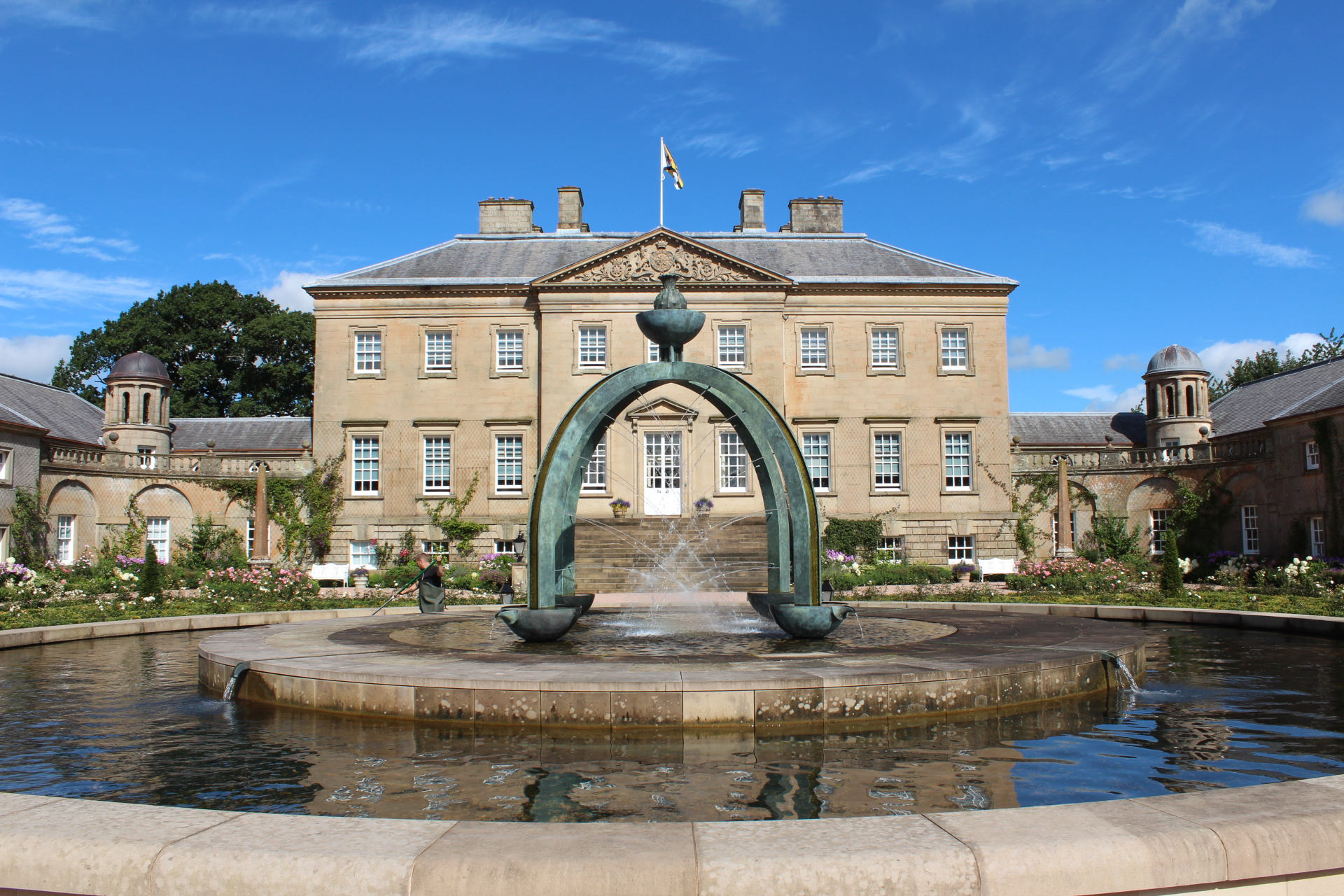
- Dumfries House and the Mahfouz Fountain, 2016

- Location in East Ayrshire
- 55°27′18″N 4°18′29″W

Site notes
- Website: dumfries-house.org.uk

Listed Building – Category A
- Designated: 14 April 1971
- Reference no.: LB14413

Inventory of Gardens and Designed Landscapes in Scotland
- Official name: Dumfries House
- Designated: 30 June 1987
- Reference no.: GDL00149

Dumfries House is a Palladian country house in Ayrshire, Scotland. It is located within a large estate, around two miles (3 km) west of Cumnock. Noted for being one of the few such houses with much of its original 18th-century furniture still present, including specially commissioned Thomas Chippendale pieces, the house and estate is now owned by and serves as the headquarters for The King's Foundation, a charity which maintains it as an educational centre, visitor attraction, and hospitality and wedding venue. Both the house and the gardens are listed as significant aspects of Scottish heritage.

The estate and an earlier house were originally called Lefnoreis Castle, owned by a branch of the Craufurds of Loudoun. The present house was built in the 1750s for William Dalrymple, 5th Earl of Dumfries, by John and Robert Adam. Having been inherited by the 2nd Marquess of Bute in 1814, it remained in his family until 2007 when the 7th Marquess sold it.

Due to its significance and the risk of the furniture collection being distributed and auctioned, in 2007 the estate and its contents were purchased by a consortium headed by Charles, Prince of Wales, including a £20m loan from the Prince's charitable trust. The intention was to renovate the estate to become self-sufficient, both to preserve it and regenerate the local economy. As well as donors and sponsorship, funding was also intended to come from constructing the nearby housing development of Knockroon, a planned community along the lines of the Prince's similar venture, Poundbury in Dorset.

The house reopened in 2008, equipped for public tours. Since then various other parts of the estate have been reopened for various uses, to provide both education and employment, as well as funding the trust's running costs. Prince Charles was in residence at the estate on 8 September 2022, when his mother, Queen Elizabeth II, became gravely ill; he was transported by helicopter to Balmoral Castle, where she died later the same day, and he became king.

== Designations ==
The house is a category A listed building, described by Historic Environment Scotland as "an exceptionally fine and unspoilt Adam mansion". The grounds of the house are included in the Inventory of Gardens and Designed Landscapes in Scotland, the national listing of significant gardens and parks.

== History ==
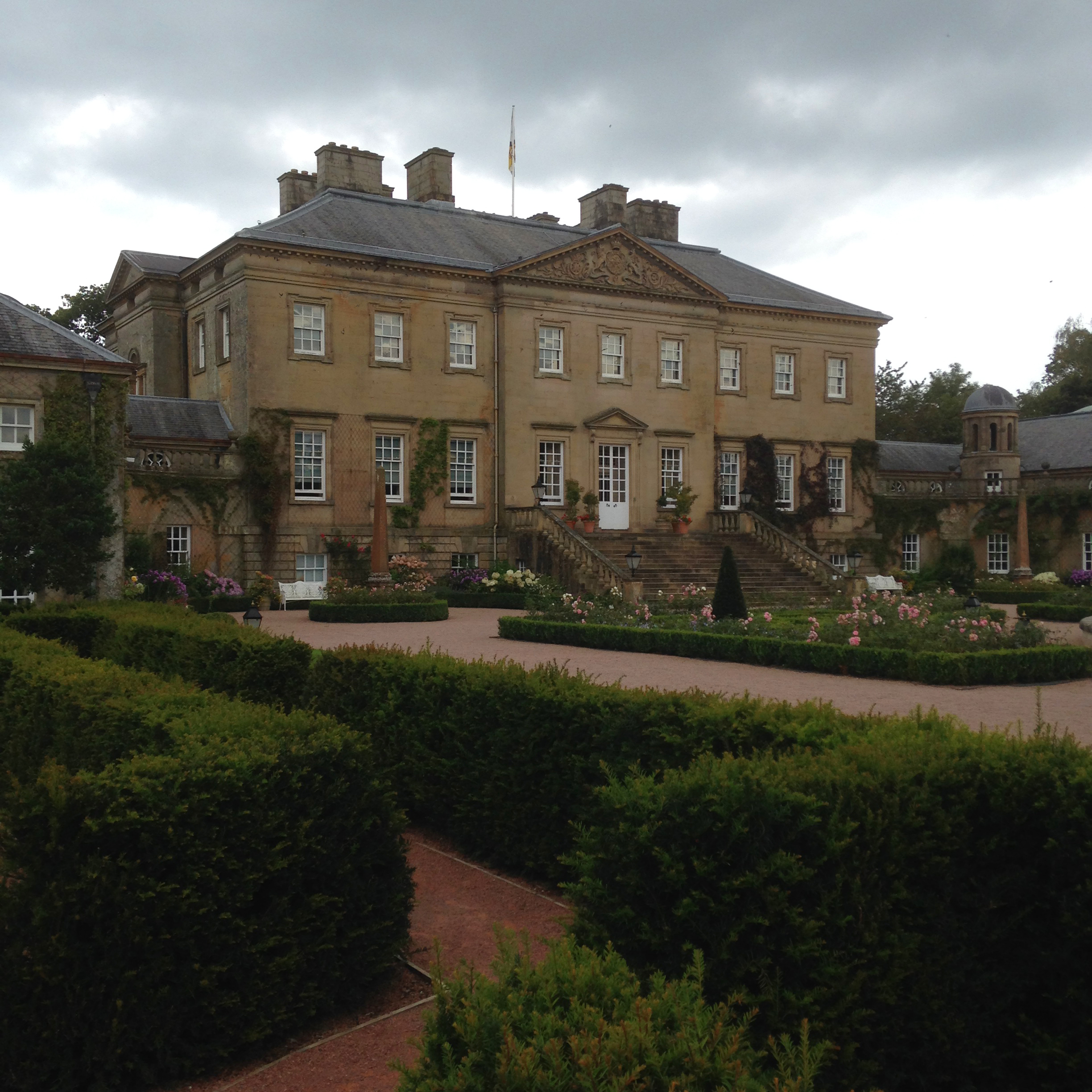
Front view of the house

=== Lochnorris estate ===
Originally the estate was known as Lefnoreis or Lochnorris, and belonged to a branch of Craufurds of Loudoun. The original castle stood on the elevated ground close to the coach house.

=== Earl of Dumfries ===
In 1635, the estate was purchased from the Craufords by William Crichton, 2nd Earl of Dumfries (1598–1691). The estate, and the title, passed via his daughter to his grandson William Dalrymple-Crichton, 5th Earl of Dumfries and 4th Earl of Stair (1699–1768). He commissioned the Adam brothers to design a new house for the estate.

Dumfries House was designed and built between 1754 and 1759, by Scottish architects John and Robert Adam; the style of the house is more in keeping with John Adam's other work. Robert Adam oversaw construction until his departure on the "Grand Tour" of Europe. The House is an early independent work by the Adam Brothers, who had taken over the architecture business of their father William Adam on his death in 1748. The house is a Palladian design, with a three-storey central block connected to smaller pavilions by linking wings. James Armour, father-in-law of the poet Robert Burns, was a master mason who worked as a contractor at Dumfries House.

=== Marquess of Bute ===
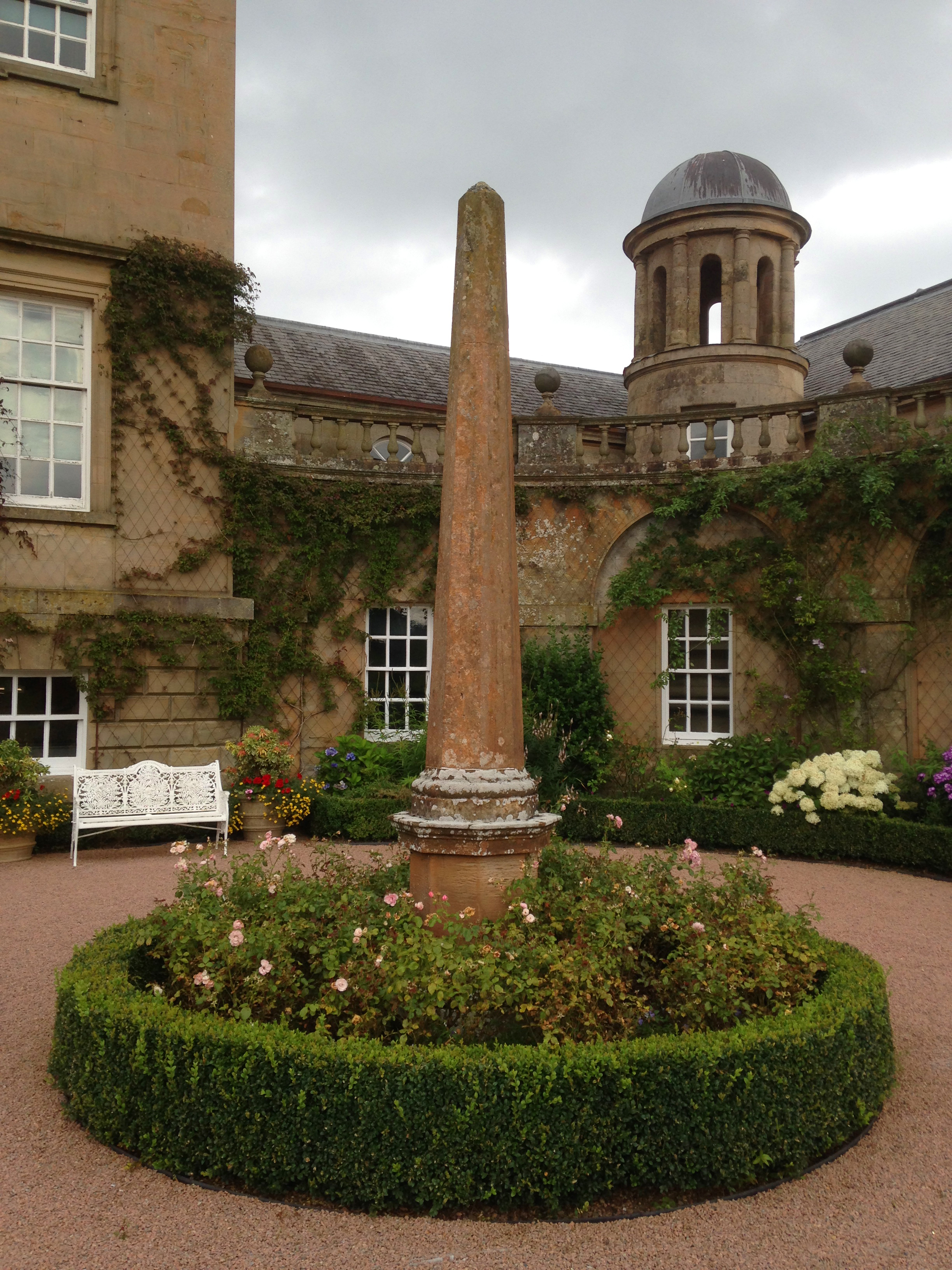
In the front garden

In 1814, Dumfries House was inherited, along with the earldom of Dumfries, by John Crichton-Stuart, 2nd Marquess of Bute, and the property remained in the Crichton-Stuart family until 2007. In 1885, the 3rd Marquess of Bute commissioned Robert Weir Schultz to design the pavilions. The Crichton-Stuart family retained their main residence at Mount Stuart House on the Isle of Bute. In the later 20th century the house was lived in by the Dowager Marchioness of Bute, Lady Eileen, until her death in 1993. The 6th Marquess died a few months later, and the house passed to Lady Eileen's grandson the 7th Marquess, the racing driver known as John Bute (and formerly as Johnny Dumfries).

==== Intended sale ====
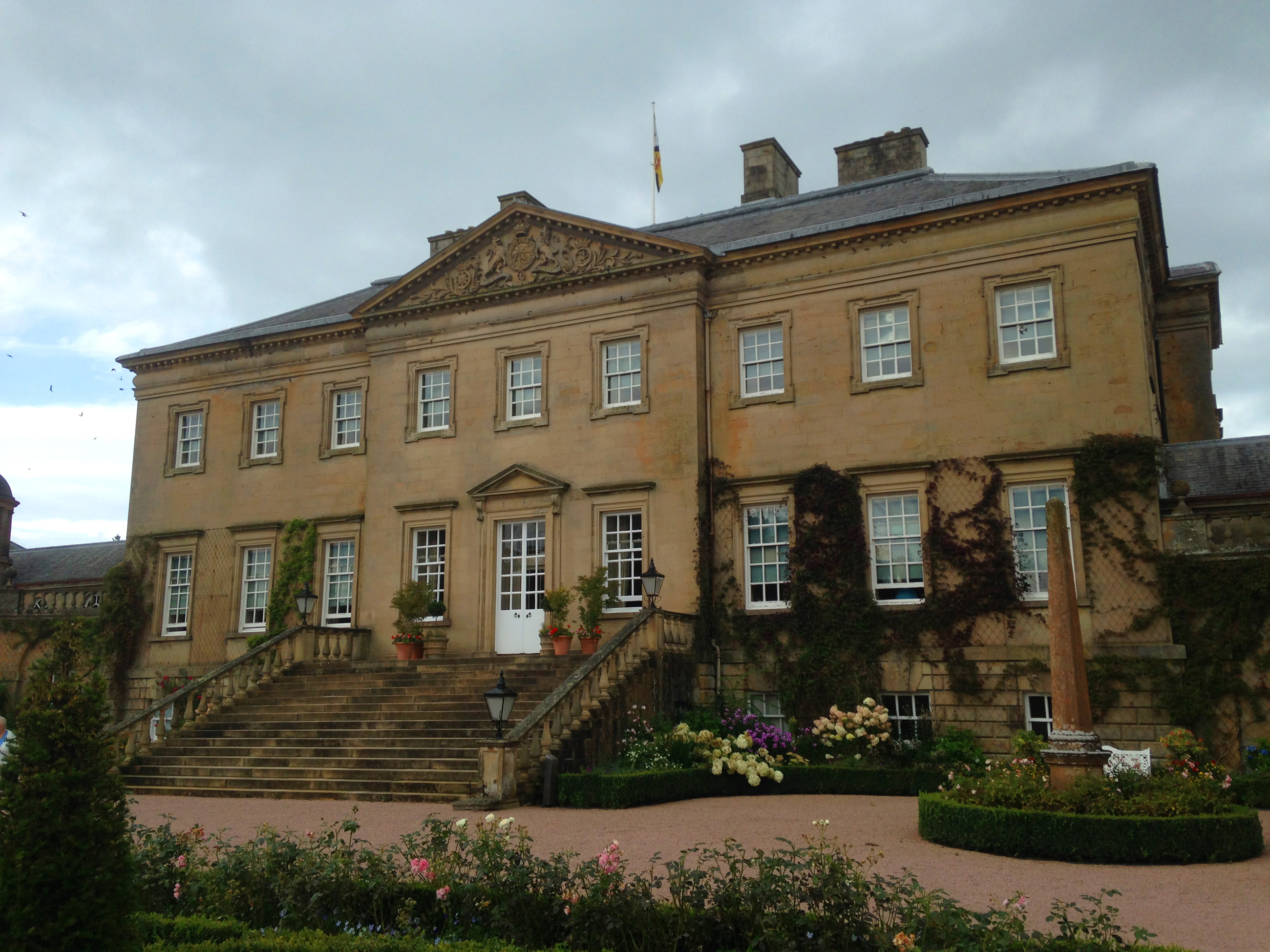
Front view of the house

With John Bute facing a bill from the death duties of both his father and grandmother, he offered to sell the house to the National Trust for Scotland in 1994, but they declined. John Bute later replaced the roof. In 2004, it was again offered, unsuccessfully, to the National Trust. In April 2007, it was announced the house would be sold and the contents auctioned separately. The house was scheduled for sale through Savills and its contents for auction by Christie's. It was thought that some of the art and furniture might fetch nearly as much as the house itself; one Chippendale rosewood bookcase, for example, was valued at £2m-£4m.

With the announcement of the sale, preservationists lamented the imminent dispersal of an ensemble said to have remained virtually untouched since an 1803 inventory, and organised a campaign intending to buy the house and hold it in trust under the Save Britain's Heritage organisation. With the funding the campaign managed to raise still falling short, a sale via the auction route looked inevitable after Historic Scotland announced in May 2007 that they would not financially back the campaign.

=== Charity ownership ===
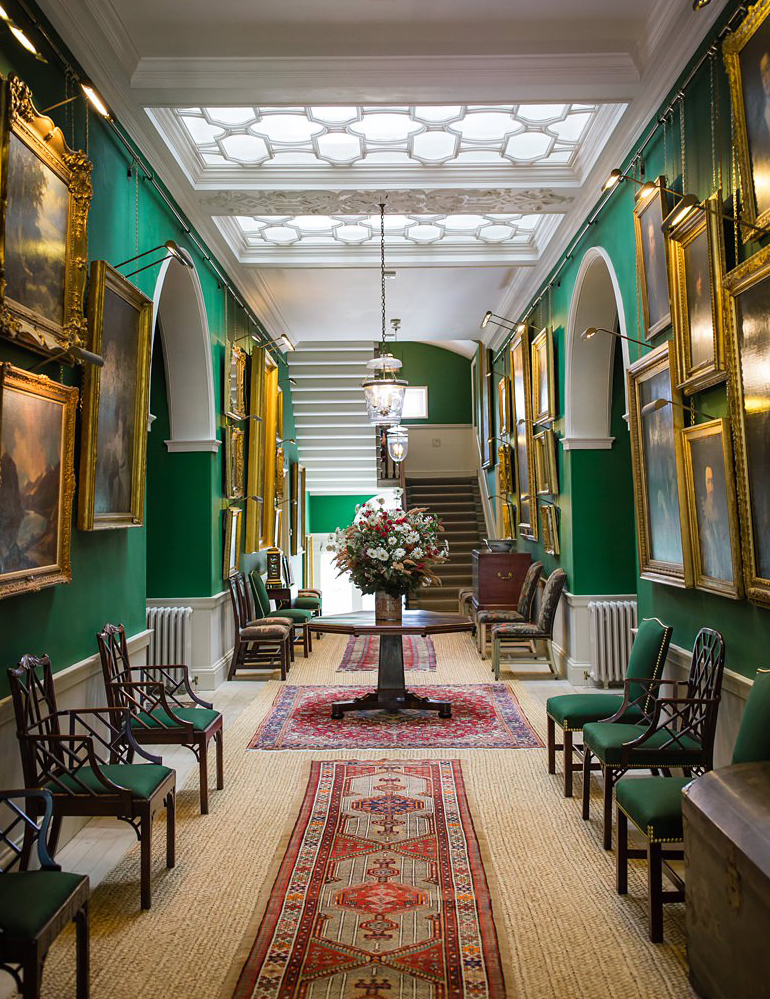
Second floor hallway to the bedrooms

The estate was finally purchased as a whole after Charles, Prince of Wales, heard about the campaign from the writer and campaign member James Knox, who made "an impassioned impromptu speech" at one of the Prince's bi-annual conservation conferences at the Palace of Holyroodhouse in Edinburgh. On 27 June 2007, it was announced that a consortium headed by the Prince, and including various heritage charities and the Scottish Government (who contributed £5m), had raised £45 million to purchase the house and contents (along with its roughly 2,000-acre (8.1 km^{2}) estate) and endow a trust for maintaining it.

The trust was set up with the name "The Great Steward of Scotland's Dumfries House Trust", a reference to the title Great Steward of Scotland then held by Charles in his role as Scottish heir apparent. A major element of the financial package was a £20m loan backed by The Prince's Charities Foundation. It was reported that the contents of the house had already been removed, and were being transported to London when the sale was agreed.

The trust's intended model is to have the estate become a self-sufficient enterprise, in the process revitalising the local economy. The project was to be achieved through donation and sponsorship of various renovation projects around the estate, as well as through revenues from the construction of an 'eco-village' in the grounds, a planned community called Knockroon.

In 2008, the Great Recession had a major impact on the project, affecting the prospects for the Knockroon development and thus the recouping of the £20 million loan. The Prince faced much media criticism for putting the Foundation's other projects at risk for what was seen as a vanity project, prompting a response in 2010 describing the risk as "manageable and fully covered." After switching to a model of private and corporate fundraising, the £20m loan was repaid by 2012, with a further £15m backing having been raised for the various renovation projects and ongoing maintenance of the estate.

Following restoration, Dumfries House itself opened to the public for guided tours on 6 June 2008. From mid-2009, supermarket chain Morrisons began funding the restoration of the meat and dairy farm attached to the estate to become a research and education tool into sustainable farming methods, but also with the intention of its becoming profitable by 2014, part of Morrisons' vertically integrated supply chain. Renovation of the former coach house and associated stable block began in winter 2010. It reopened in 2011 as both a visitor cafe and bistro dining facility. The first phase of the Knockroon village opened in May 2011.

In October 2011, work was started on clearing the area that used to be the Walled Garden, which had fallen into disuse and become overgrown. In April 2012, the six-bedroomed guest house Dumfries House Lodge opened, to provide guest accommodation for wedding parties and other events. It was created by renovating a derelict farm building on the estate. The estate's former water-powered sawmill was renovated to full working order and, with the addition of a larger workshop building, re-opened as the Sawmill Building Skills Centre, a traditional skills education facility.

Charles, while Prince of Wales and known in Scotland as the Duke of Rothesay, continued to support Dumfries House. In September 2012, with his wife Camilla, then the Duchess of Rothesay and of Cornwall, and First Minister of Scotland Alex Salmond, Charles attended Ladies' Day at Ayr Racecourse in aid of the Trust.

In 2017, the Prince of Wales celebrated 10 years of Dumfries house; he was quoted in Dumfries House Magazine as saying, "We now have over 150 employees and thousands of individuals using the estate. My hope, therefore, is that this publication can help to involve a wider audience of supporters by providing an insight to all that happens on this estate and to its even more important outreach work."

In September 2017, the Duke and Duchess of Rothesay welcomed Michael D. Higgins, the president of Ireland, and his wife, Sabina Higgins, to Dumfries House and attended a concert celebrating 25 years of Classic FM.

In May 2018, "The Great Steward of Scotland's Dumfries House Trust" was renamed "The Prince's Foundation".

In 2019, the BBC reported that The Prince's Charities Foundation had accepted US$202,000 in donations from Quantus Division Ltd, a company that was part of an offshore network managed by Ruben Vardanyan's Moscow investment bank Troika Dialog that moved billions out of Russia. Money from the network was used to help with restoring parts of Dumfries House. Vardanyan stated that any donations to the Prince's Charities Foundation were from his personal funds.

In October 2022 Charles, now King, took part in a special edition of the BBC TV programme The Repair Shop filmed at Dumfries House, sharing objects from the collection in need of restoration. In January 2023, it was reported that Dumfries House would be open to the public as a part of an initiative by the Prince's Foundation to tackle loneliness and isolation in cold weather by providing warm spaces.

In September 2023, the King held a Privy Council Meeting at the house for the first time.

In January 2026, the Foundation announced plans for a 430 square metres (4,600 sq ft) extension to the east wing of the house to be used for ticketed events and private hire, at an estimated cost of £6.5 million. The extension, to be known as the King's Hall, would replace the existing Pavilion marquee, and was scheduled to open in summer 2027.

In September 2026, the King hosted an international AI summit at Dumfries House.

== Gallery ==
Gardens
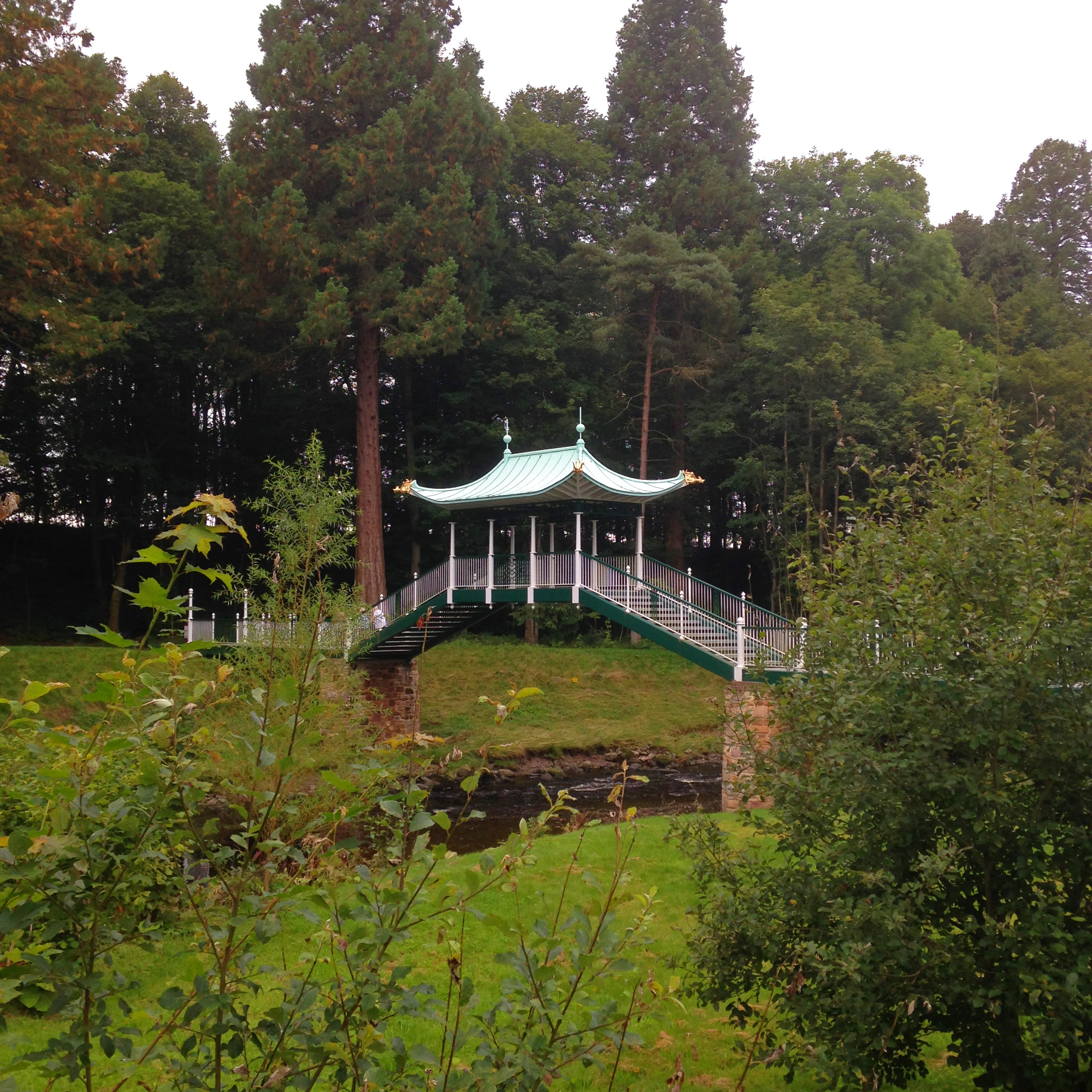
The Chinese Bridge

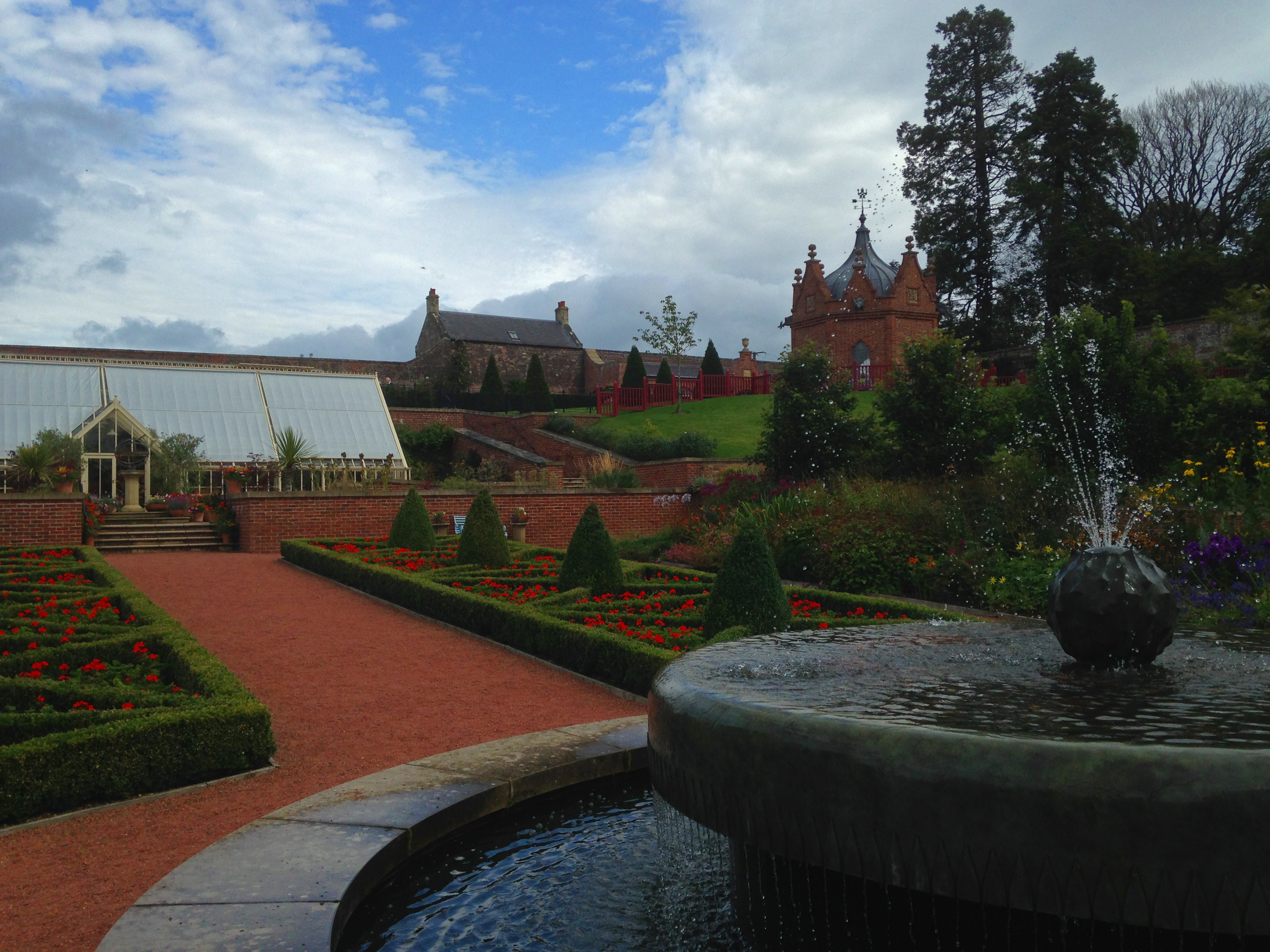
The Queen Elizabeth Walled Gardens

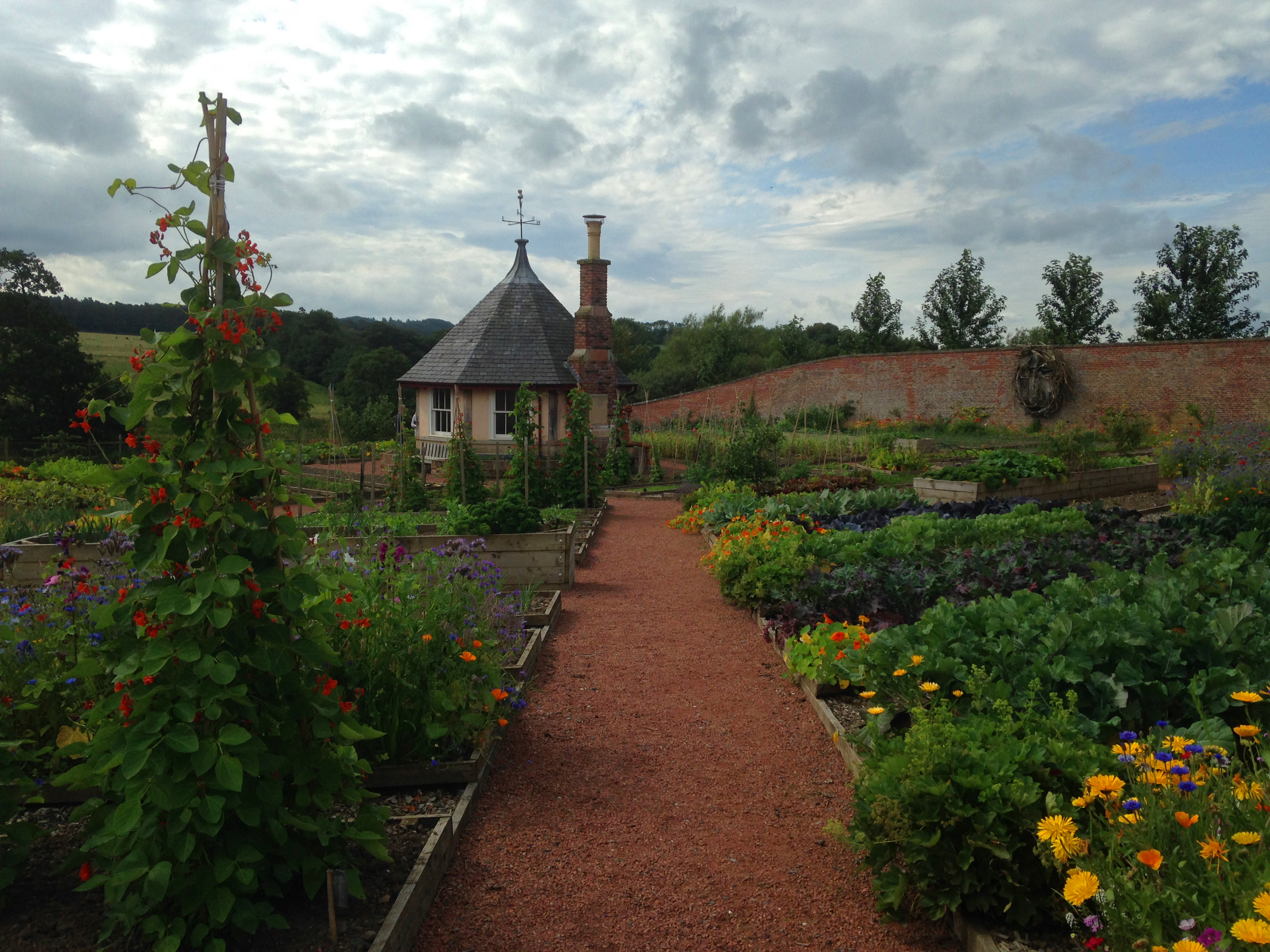
The Queen Elizabeth Walled Gardens

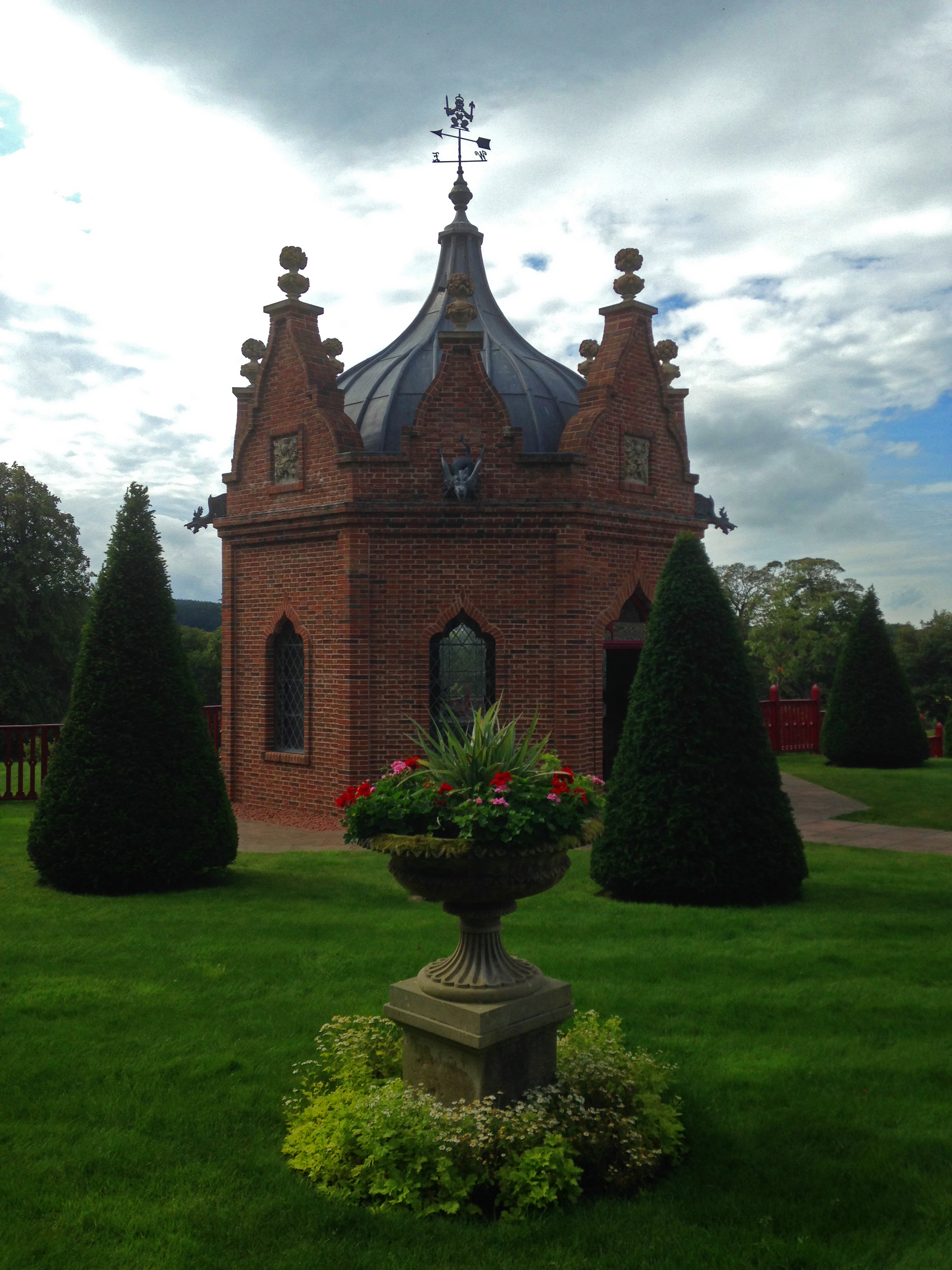
The Queen Elizabeth Walled Gardens

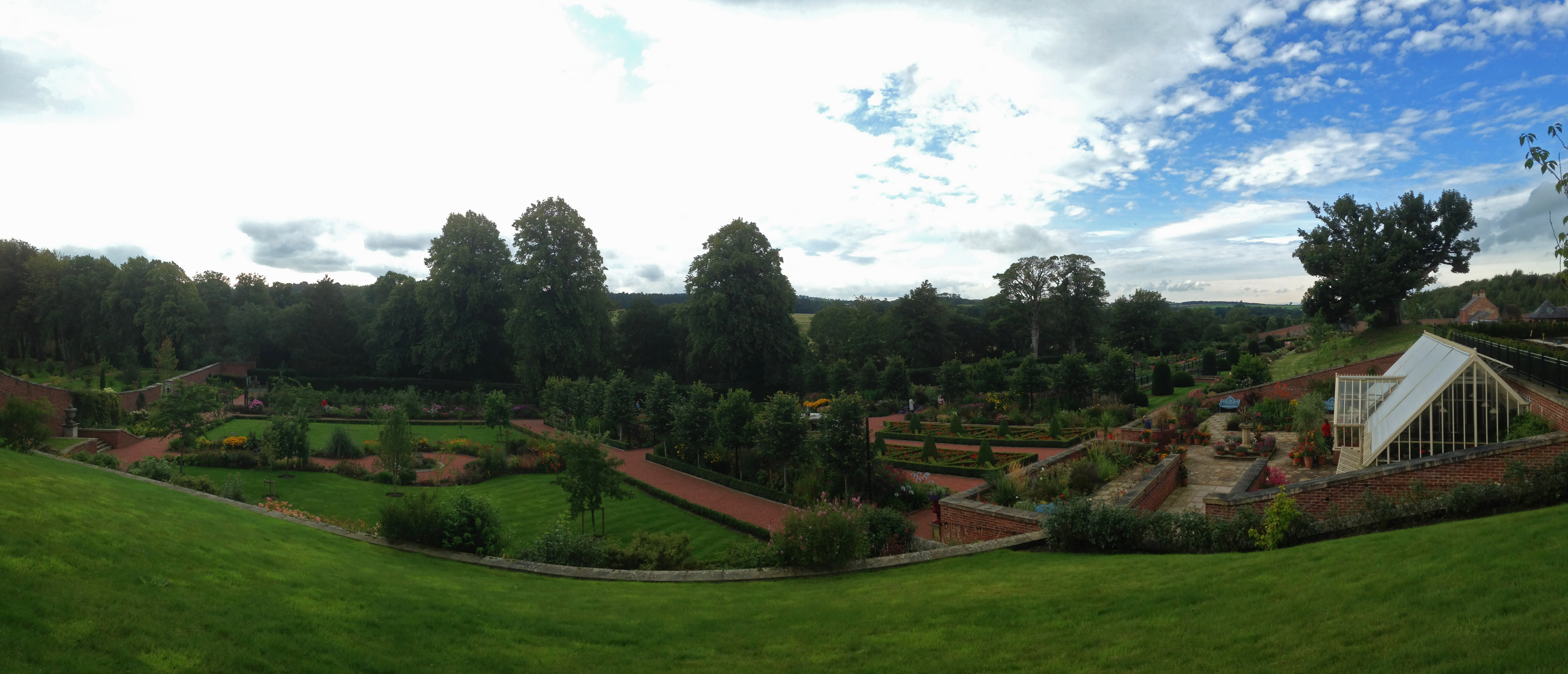
The Queen Elizabeth Walled Gardens
Dovecote before and after
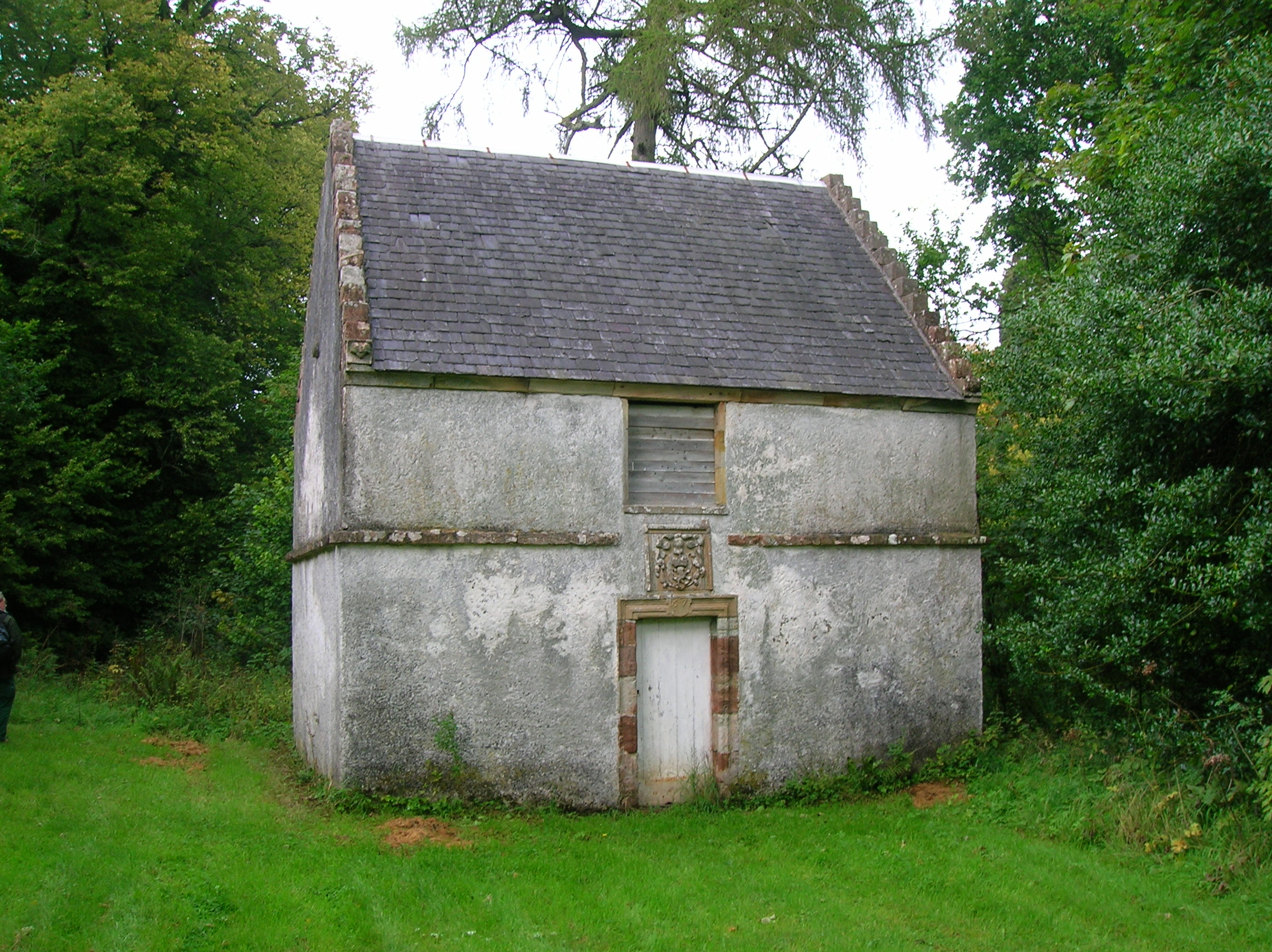
Old Dovecote at Dumfries House dated 1671

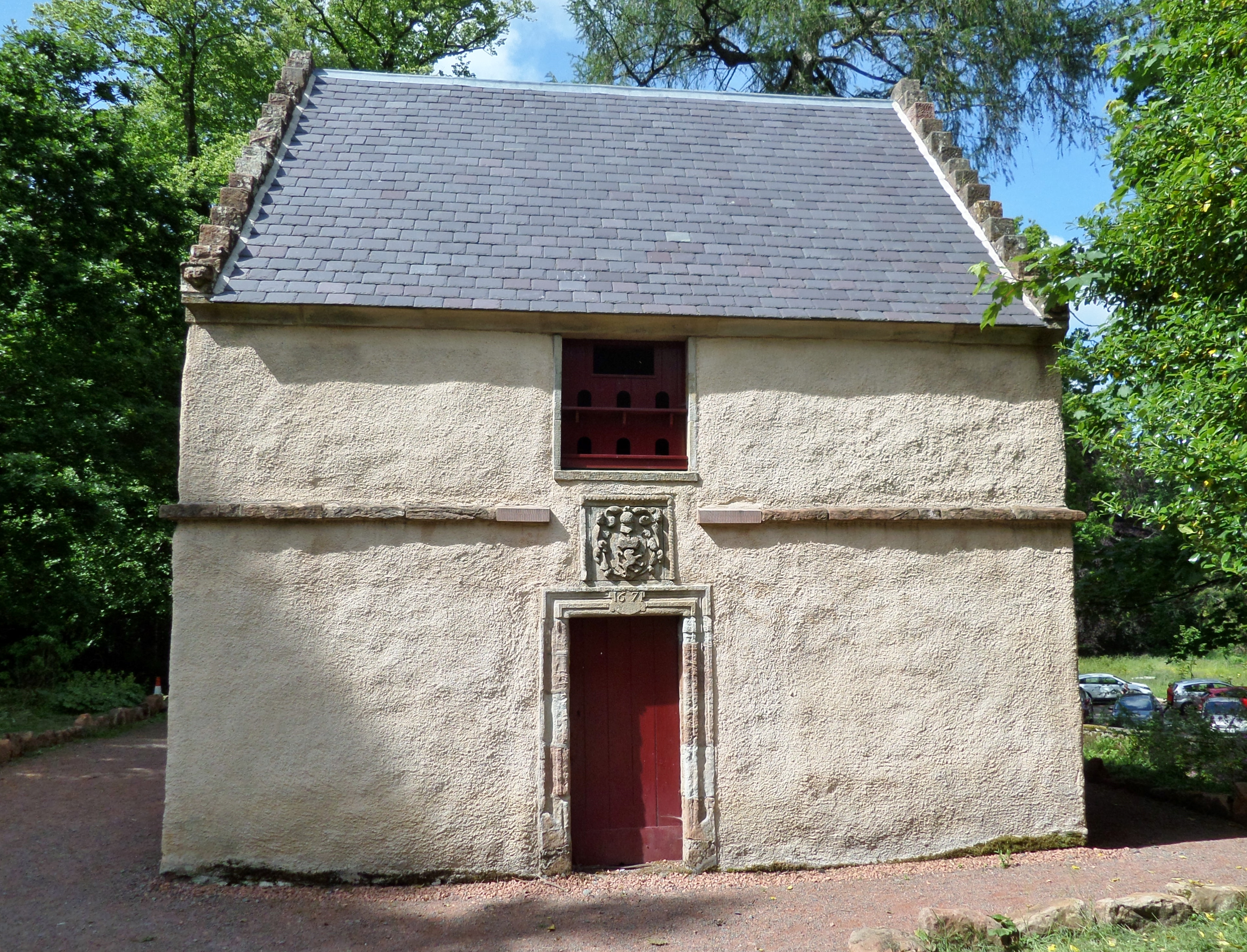
Old Dovecote at Dumfries House following restoration

== Education ==
Dumfries House is home to several separate education centres where school pupils can visit to learn about topics ranging from science, technology, engineering and maths (STEM) to farming and gardening. Education programs are linked into the Scottish Curriculum for Excellence and offer pupils from the surrounding Ayrshire, Dumfries and Galloway, Glasgow and Lanarkshire an opportunity to learn about future careers and learn new skills.

The estate serves as the headquarters The King's Foundation and includes a cookery school and health and wellness centre, as well as providing education in traditional crafts in its "training quarter" where students learn "everything from stonemasonry, blacksmithing and joinery to glazing, horticulture and textile making." Centres are open year-round to primary schools and secondary schools.

In 2022, the MacRobert Trust began funding a new purpose-built farming and rural skills training centre at Dumfries House, where the Prince's Foundation will host events and hands-on workshops for around 1,800 participants each year. According to the BBC, "In a part of Scotland where opportunities dwindled following the decline of mining, the transformation has been striking. Where there was once a dearth of opportunity, there is now possibility, with around 10,000 students studying on the estate each year."

== See also ==
- Terringzean Castle, a ruin within the Dumfries House estate
