= Loch Doon Castle =

Coordinates: 55.2238°N 4.3784°W

Designations

Scheduled monument
- Official name: Loch Doon Castle
- Type: Secular: castle
- Designated: 31 December 1921
- Reference no.: SM90203

Scheduled monument
- Official name: Loch Doon Castle, original site & remains
- Type: Secular: castle
- Designated: 3 November 1999
- Reference no.: SM8619

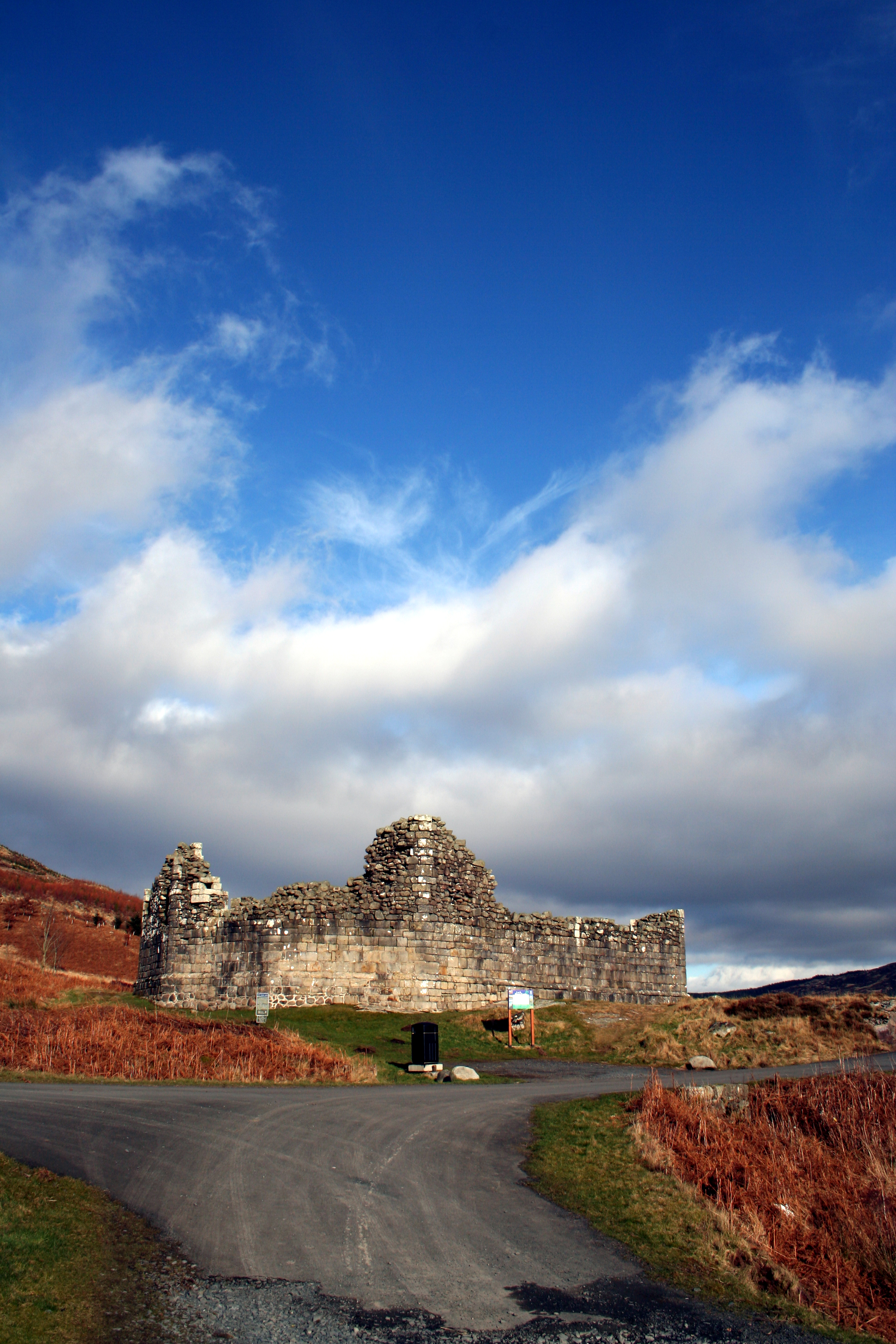
The relocated Doon Castle

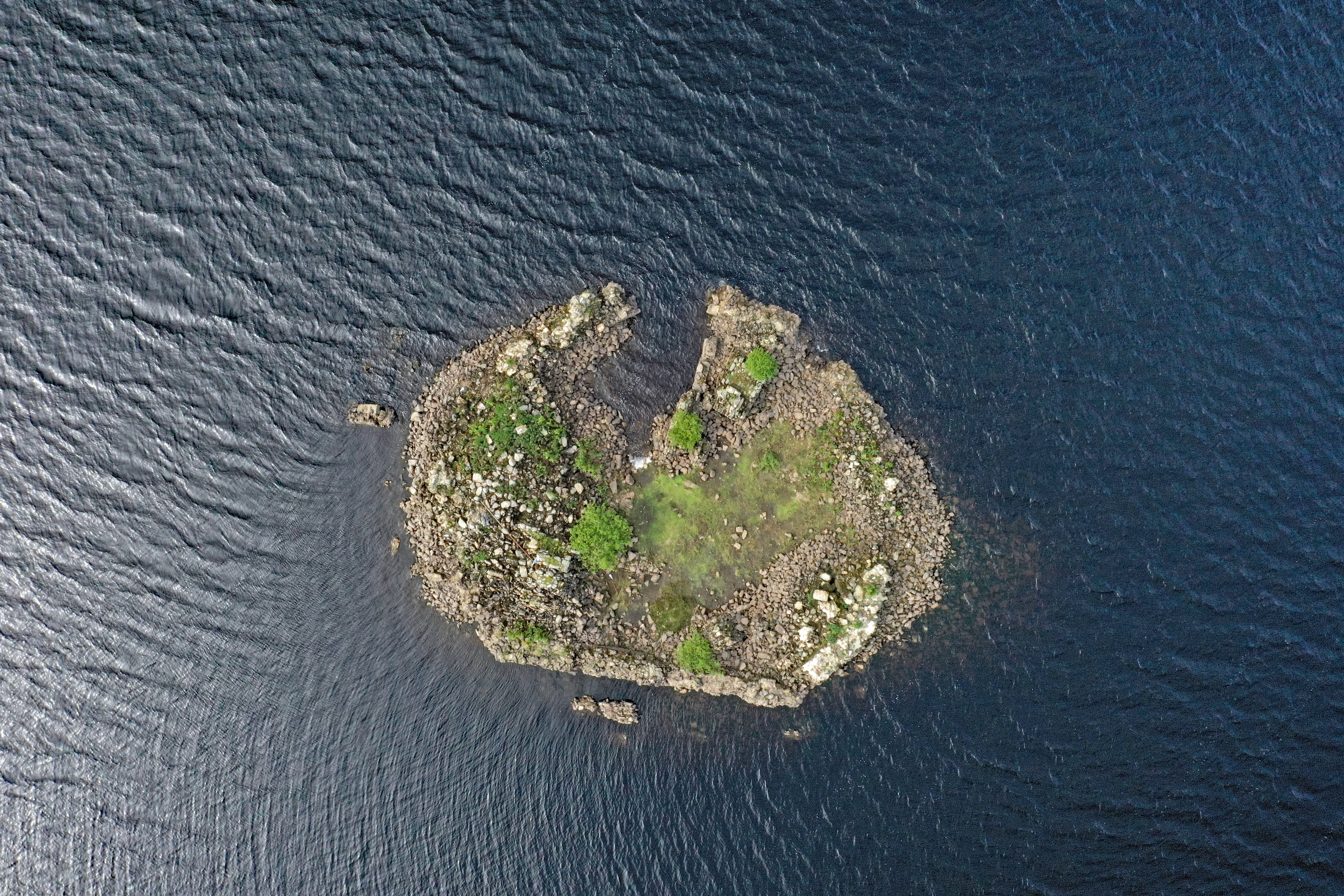
Top view of the original site

Loch Doon Castle was a castle that was located on an island within Loch Doon, Scotland. The original site and the relocated remains are designated as scheduled monuments.

== History ==
Loch Doon Castle was built in the late 13th century on an island within Loch Doon. The castle consists of an eleven-sided curtain wall. The castle was in the hands of the Earls of Carrick in the 12th century. During the Scottish Wars of Independence, it was held by the governor Sir Gilbert de Carrick (Gille Brighde) who surrendered it to the English. It was soon recovered by the forces of King Robert I of Scotland. In 1206 the Corrie family were the hereditary keepers of Castle Loch Doon, and 57 years later, owing to the marriage of Sir Robert Corrie to Lady Susanna Carlisle, added greatly to their possessions in Dumfriesshire. The castle later fell to the English and was re-captured in 1214. The castle was besieged in 1335. During the 14th century, the castle was in the hands of the Kennedy family. The castle was taken from them by William Douglas, 8th Earl of Douglas after a siege in 1446. Having been given back to the Kennedy family, the castle was again taken from them by William Crauford of Lefnoris in 1511. The castle was destroyed in the 16th century by King James V of Scotland, as part of a general policy of reducing the power of the barons of Galloway.

The castle was dismantled and rebuilt on the side of the loch after the loch water level was raised in the 1930s for a hydro-electric scheme.
