= List of places in East Ayrshire =

This List of places in East Ayrshire is a list of links for any town, village and hamlet in the East Ayrshire council area of Scotland.

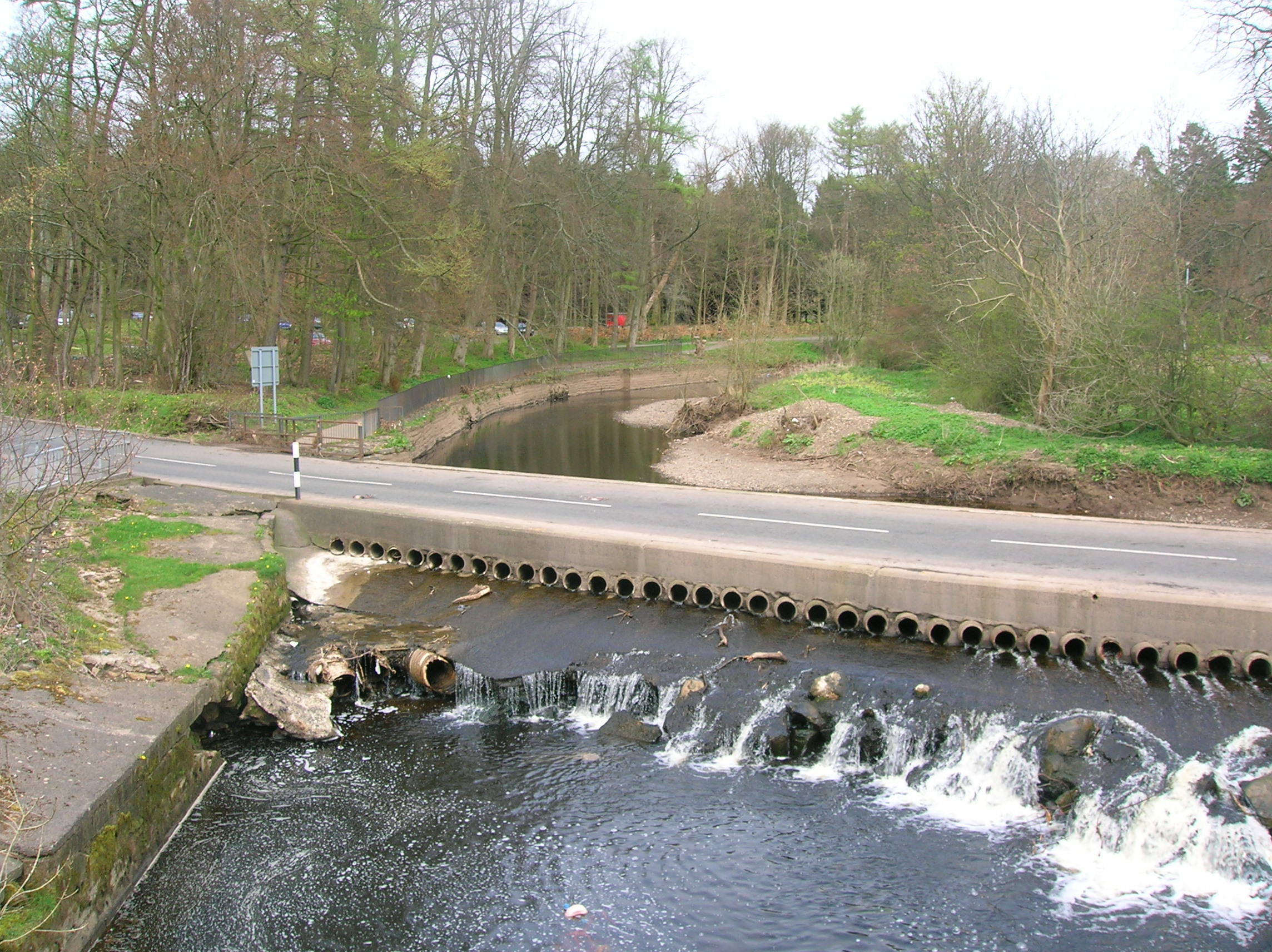
Dean Ford over Kilmarnock Water

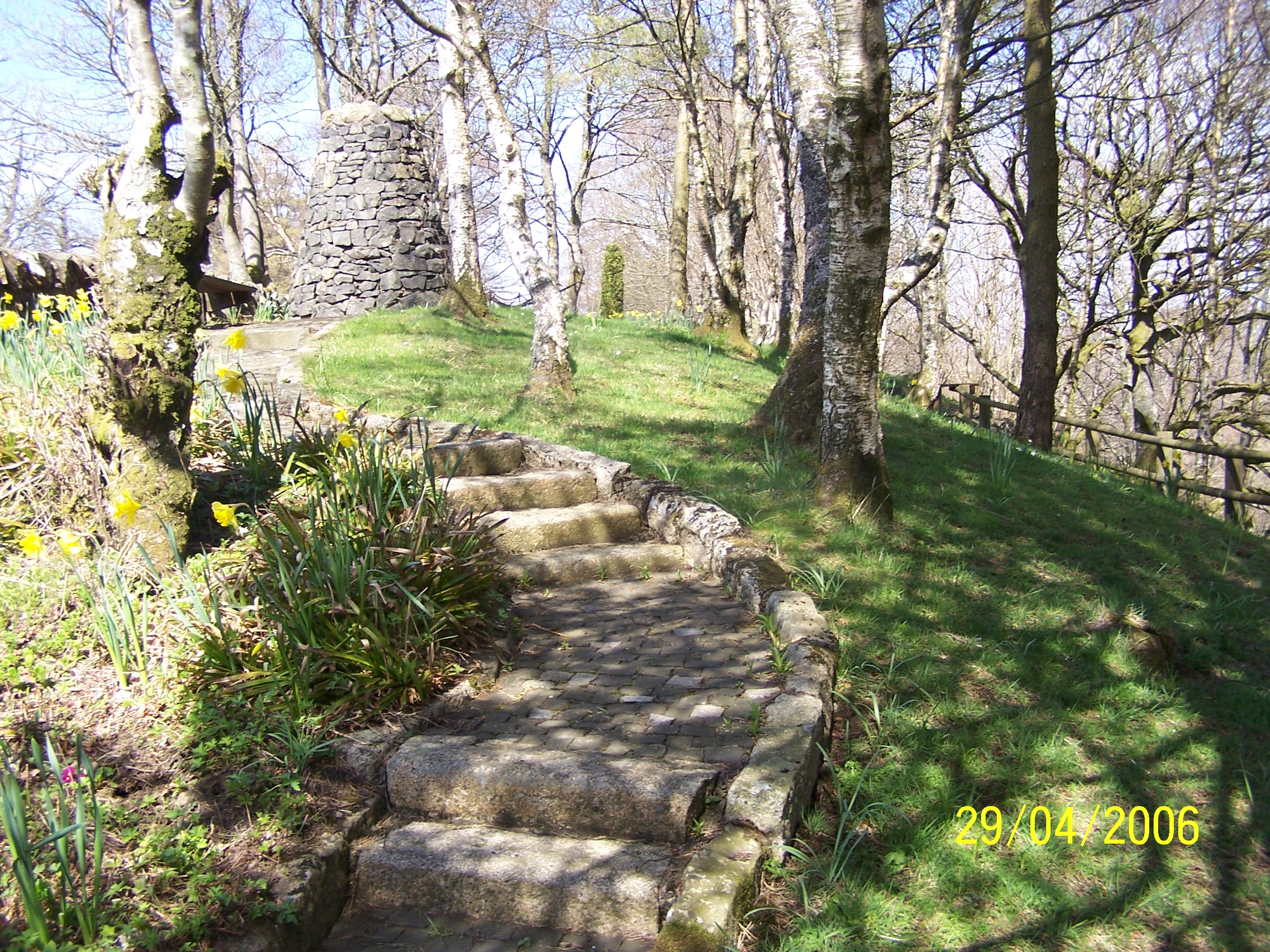
River Afton, Burns cairn

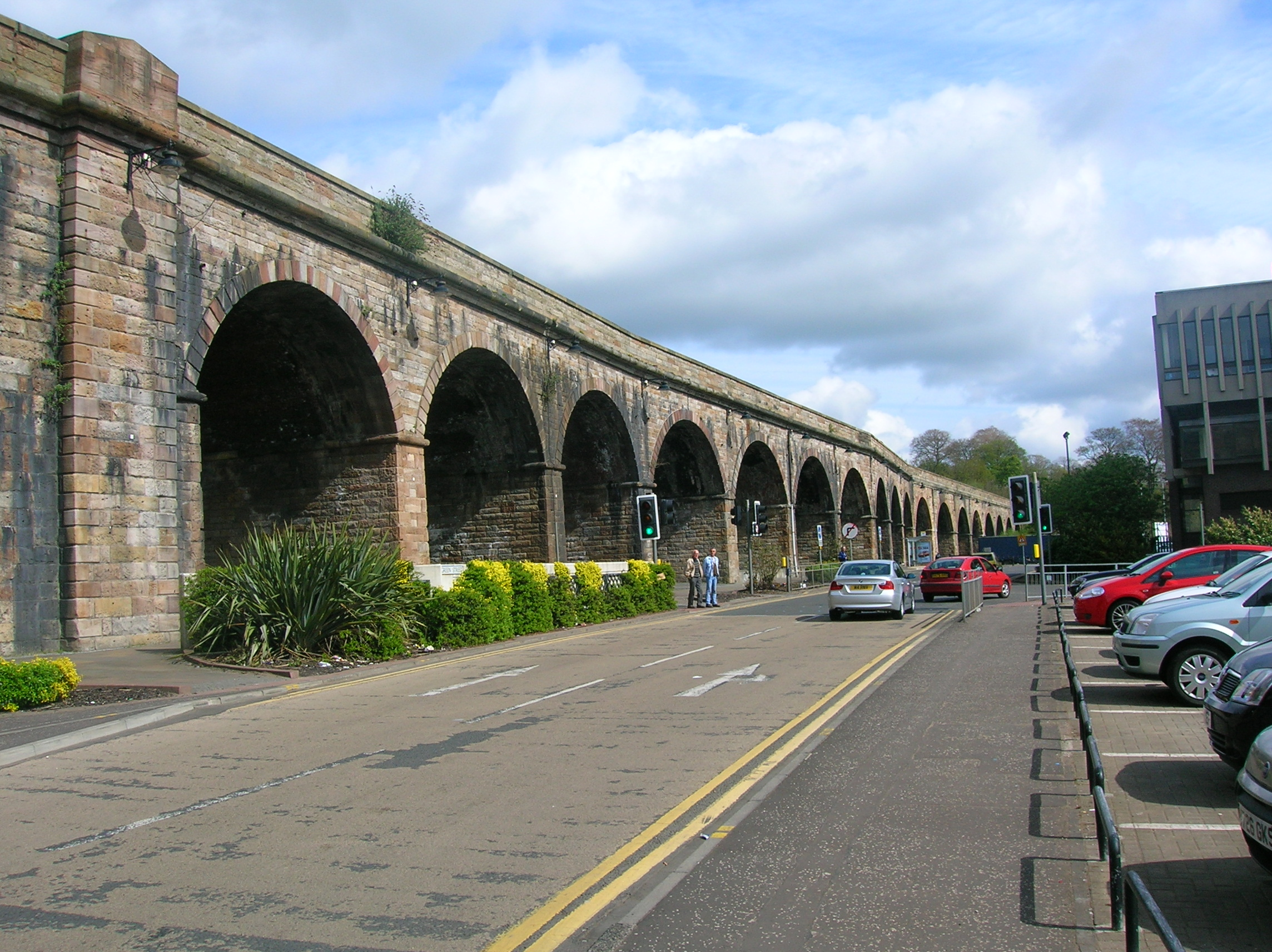
Kilmarnock Viaduct

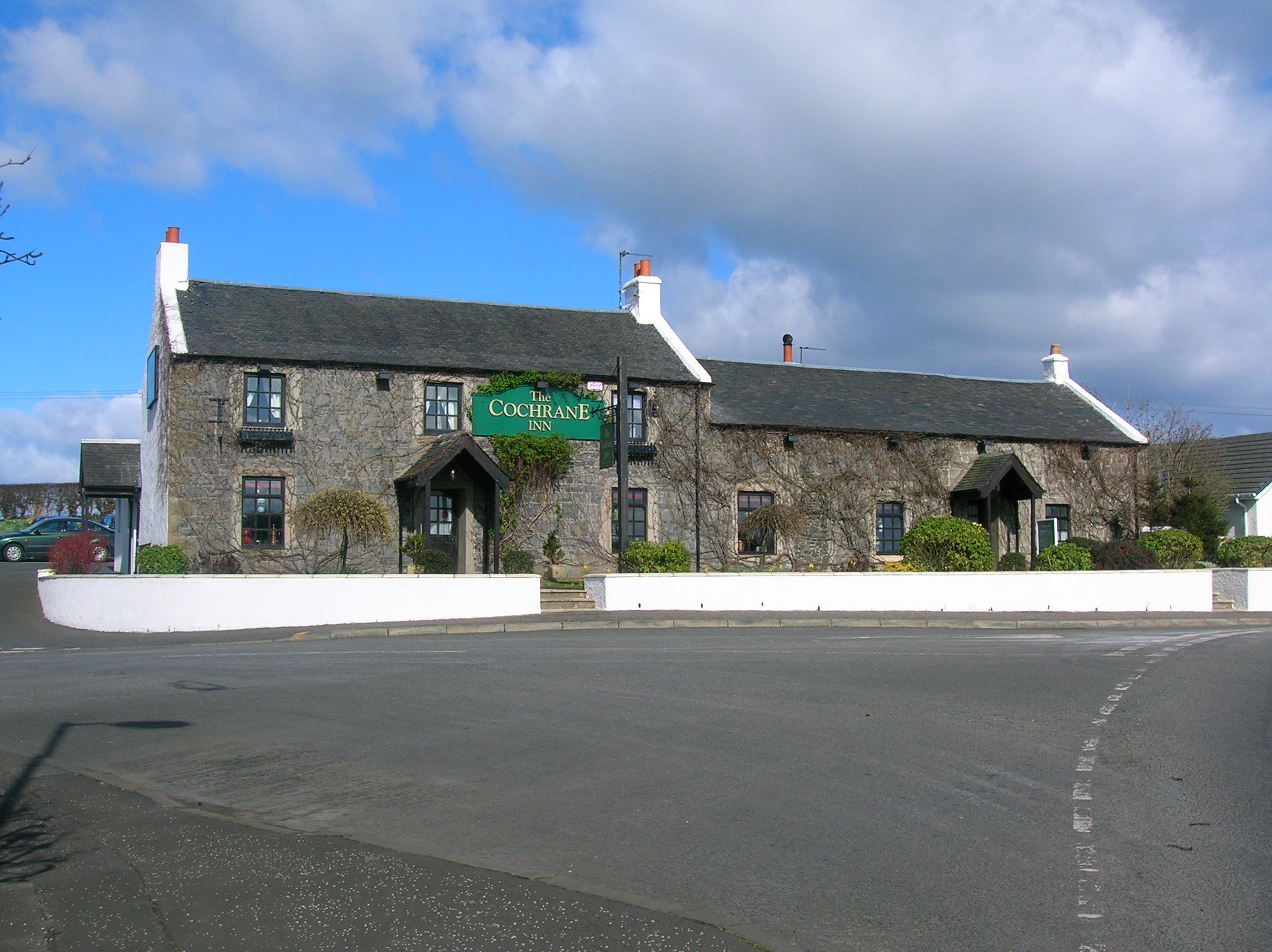
Gatehead

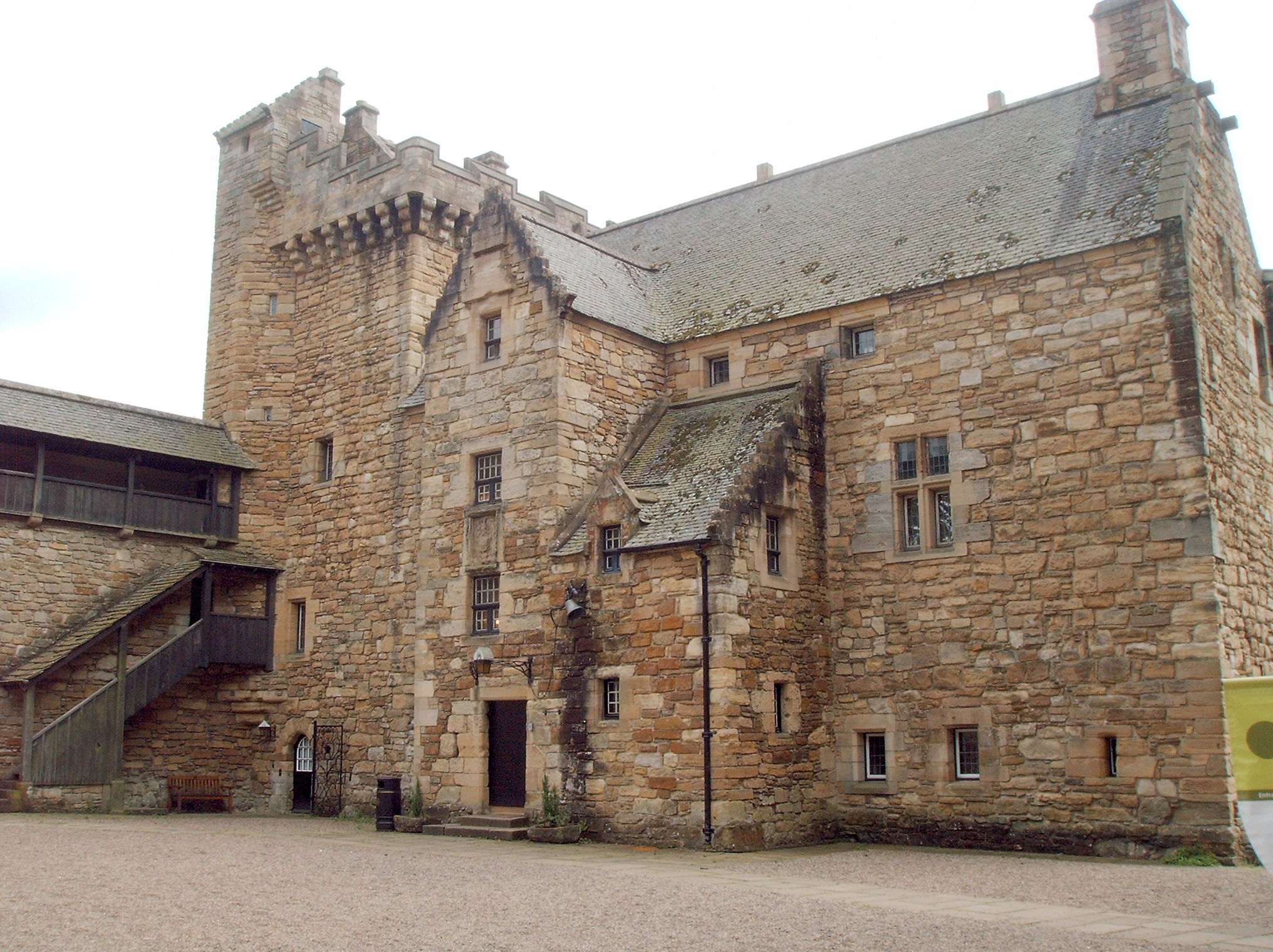
Dean Castle Palace

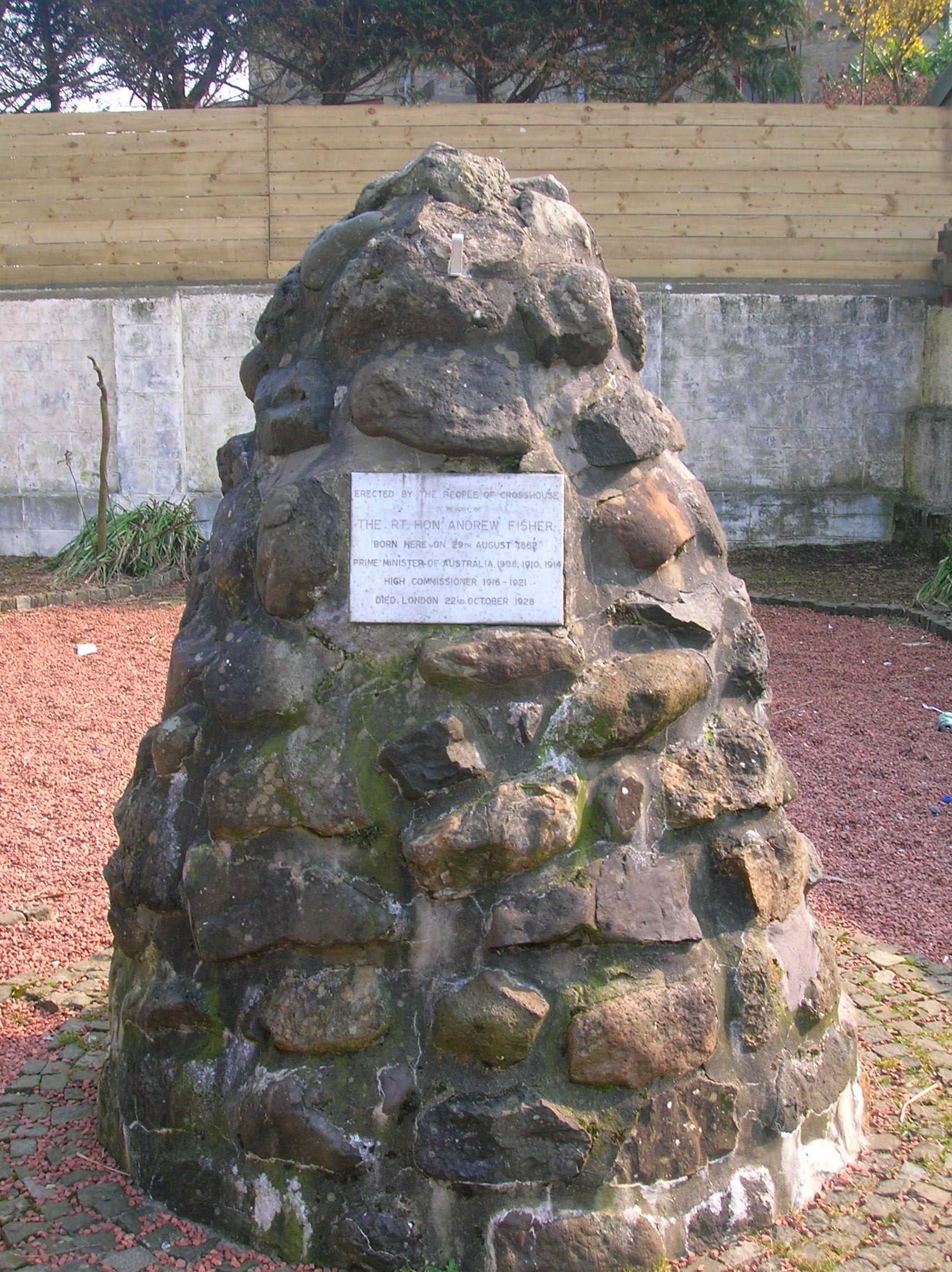
Cairn, Gatehead

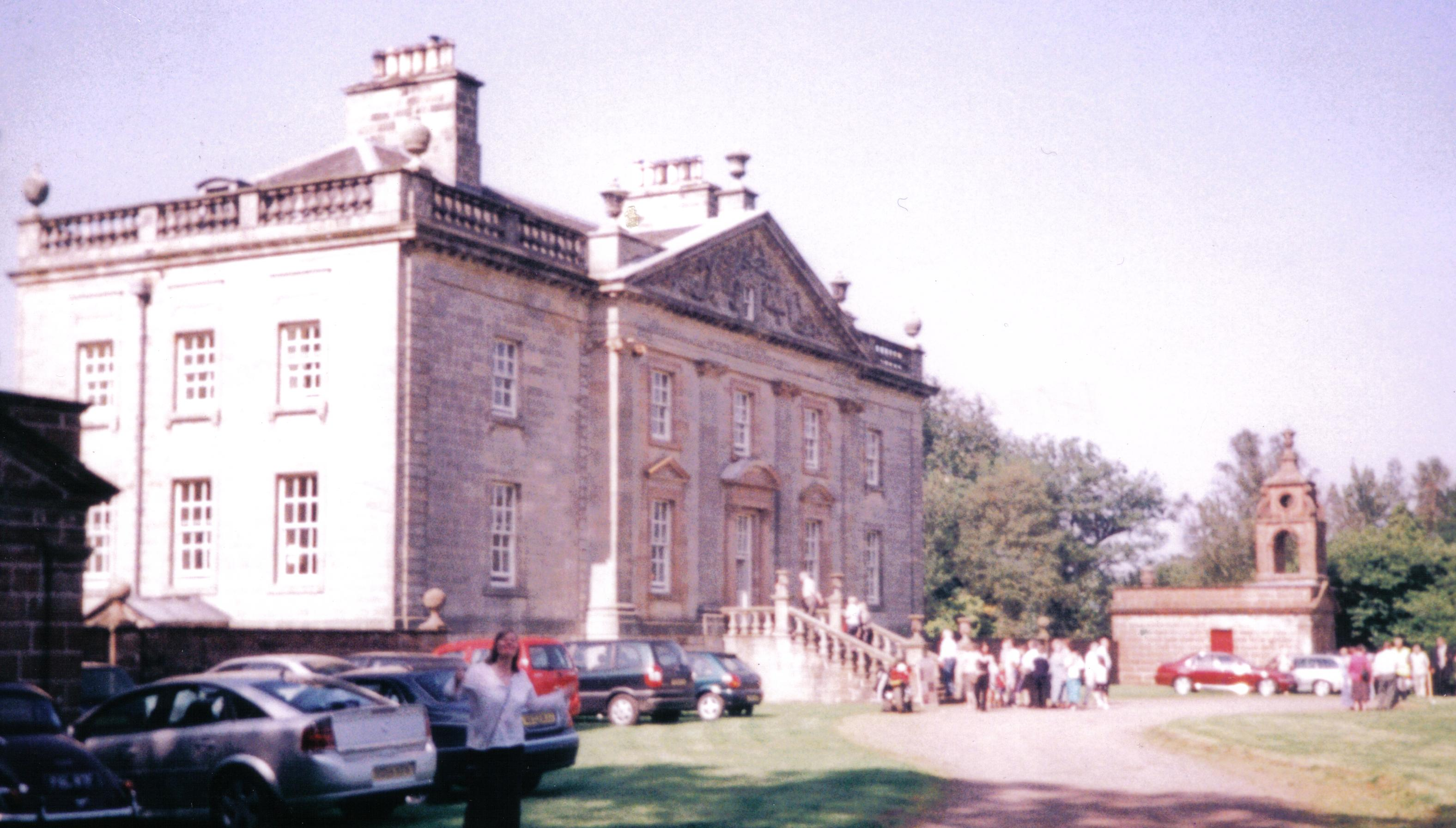
Auchinleck House

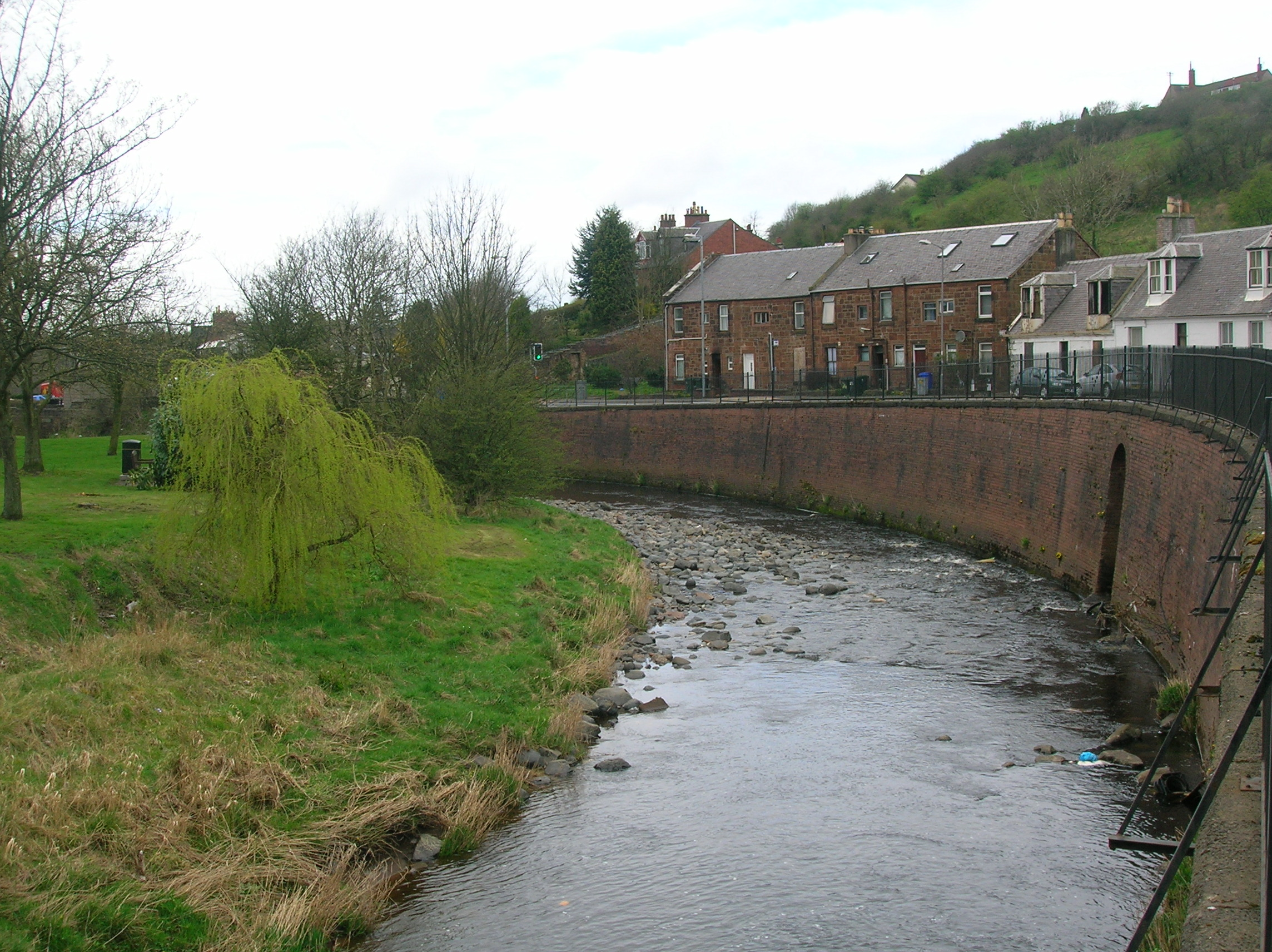
River Irvine at Newmilns

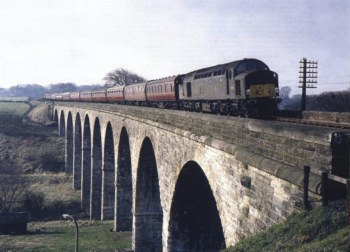
Stewarton Viaduct

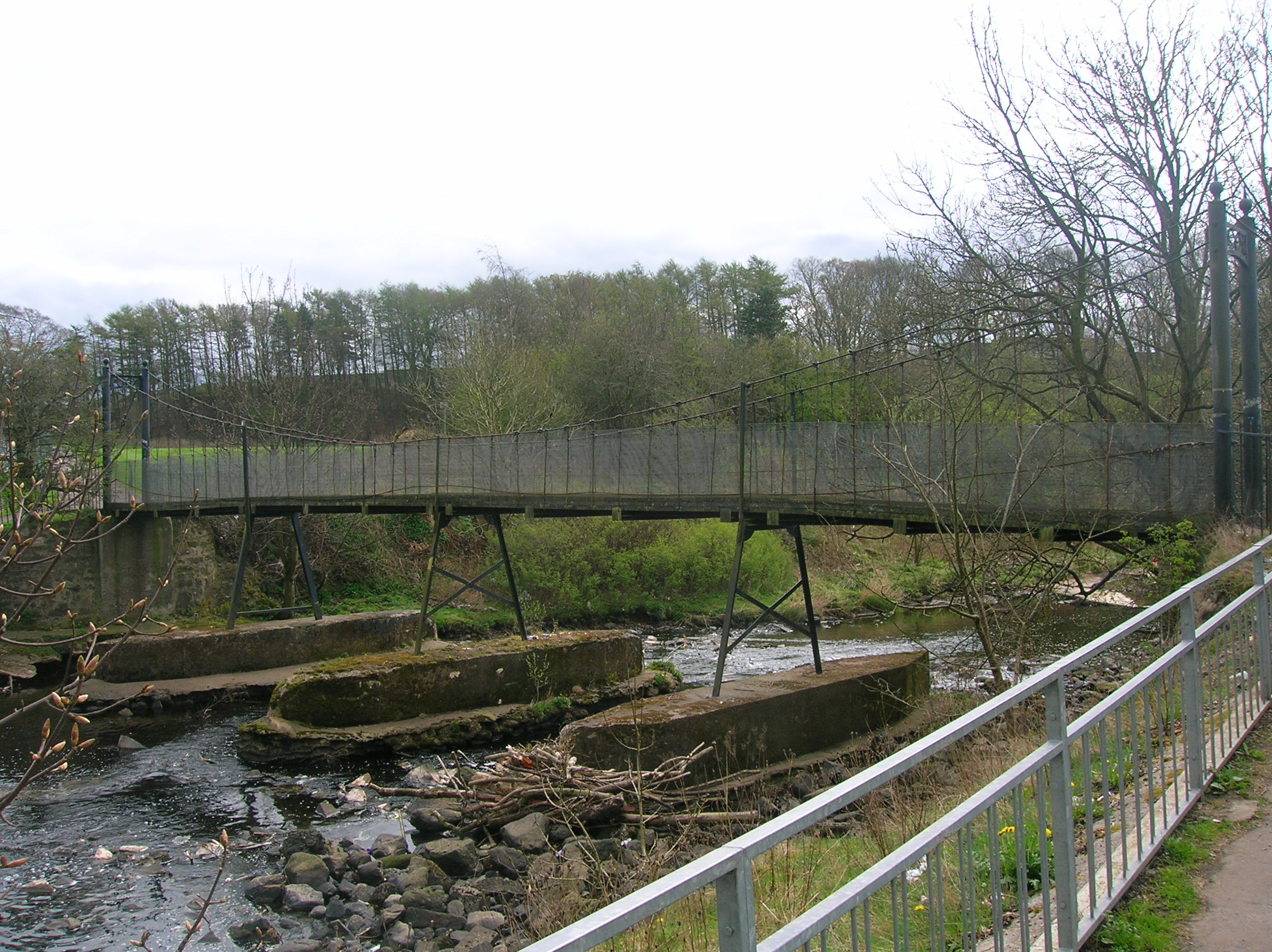
Dean Suspension Bridge

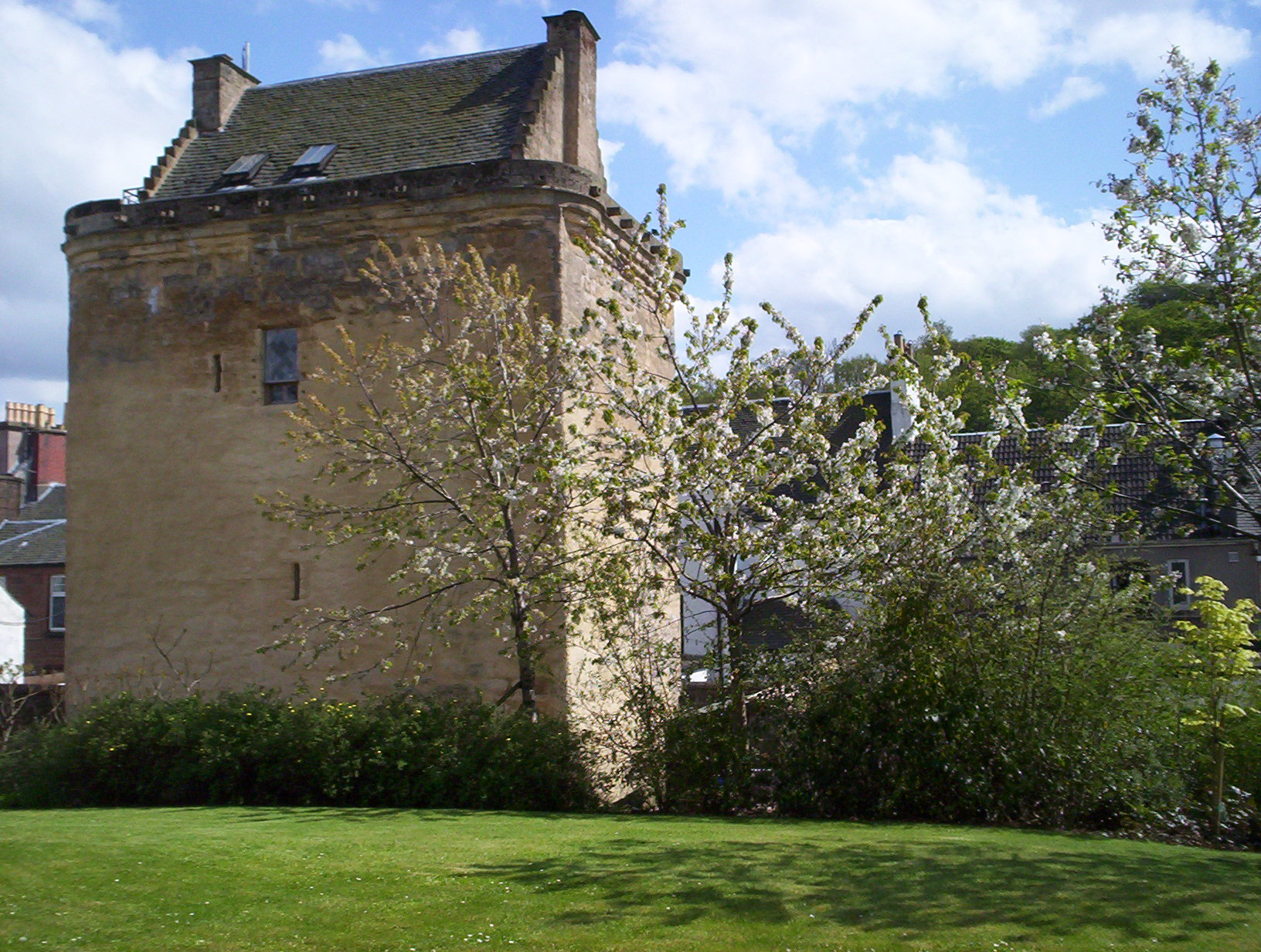
Newmilns Tower

== A ==
- Auchinleck, Auchinleck House, Auchinleck railway station

== B ==
- Barr Castle
- Battle of Mauchline Muir
- Black Loch
- Busbie Castle
- Bellsbank

== C ==
- Catrine
- Chapeltoun
- Corsehill
- Craigmalloch
- Creoch Loch
- Cronberry
- Crosshouse, Crosshouse railway station
- Cumnock

== D ==
- Dalmellington
- Dalrymple
- Darvel
- Dean Castle
- Deil's Dyke
- Dick Institute
- Drongan
- Dunlop

== F ==
- Fenwick

== G ==
- Galston
- Gatehead, East Ayrshire, Gatehead railway station
- Greenholm

== H ==
- Hurlford

== K ==
- Kay Park
- Kilmarnock, Kilmarnock and Troon Railway, Kilmarnock Cross, Kilmarnock railway station, Kilmarnock railway viaduct
- Kilmaurs, Kilmaurs Place, Kilmaurs railway station
- Knockentiber

== L ==
- Lady's Well
- Laigh Kirk
- Laigh Milton Viaduct
- Loch o' th' Lowes
- Logan
- Loudoun, Loudoun Castle, Loudoun Hill
- Lowes Loch
- Lugar, Lugar Water
- Lugton

== M ==
- Mauchline, Battle of Mauchline Muir
- Moot Hill
- Moscow
- Muirkirk

N

- Netherthird
- New Cumnock, New Cumnock railway station
- Newmilns

== O ==
- Ochiltree

== P ==
- Palace Theatre
- Patna
- Polnessan
- Priestland

== R ==
- Rankinston
- Riccarton, Ayrshire
- River Ayr, River Doon, River Irvine
- Rugby Park

== S ==
- Sorn, Sorn Castle
- Stair, Stair House
- Stewarton, Stewarton railway station

== T ==
- Thorntoun, Thorntoun house and estate
- Trabboch

== W ==
- Waterside

== See also ==
- List of places in Scotland
