= New Cumnock =

Coordinates: 55.3968°N 4.1839°W

- Village
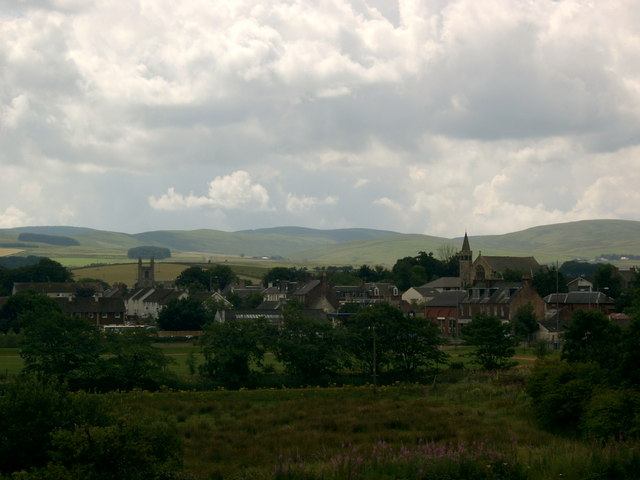
- Skyline of New Cumnock

- Location within East Ayrshire
- Population: 2,590 (2020)
- Language: English; Scots
- OS grid reference: NS6113
- Council area: East Ayrshire
- Lieutenancy area: Ayrshire and Arran
- Country: Scotland
- Sovereign state: United Kingdom
- Post town: Cumnock
- Postcode district: KA18
- Police: Scotland
- Fire: Scottish
- Ambulance: Scottish
- UK Parliament: Ayr, Carrick and Cumnock
- Scottish Parliament: Carrick, Cumnock and Doon Valley

New Cumnock is a village in East Ayrshire, Scotland. It expanded during the coal-mining era from the late 18th century, and mining remained its key industry until its pits were shut in the 1960s. The village is 5 3/4 miles (9.5 kilometres) southeast of Cumnock, and 21 miles (34 kilometres) east of Ayr.

== History ==
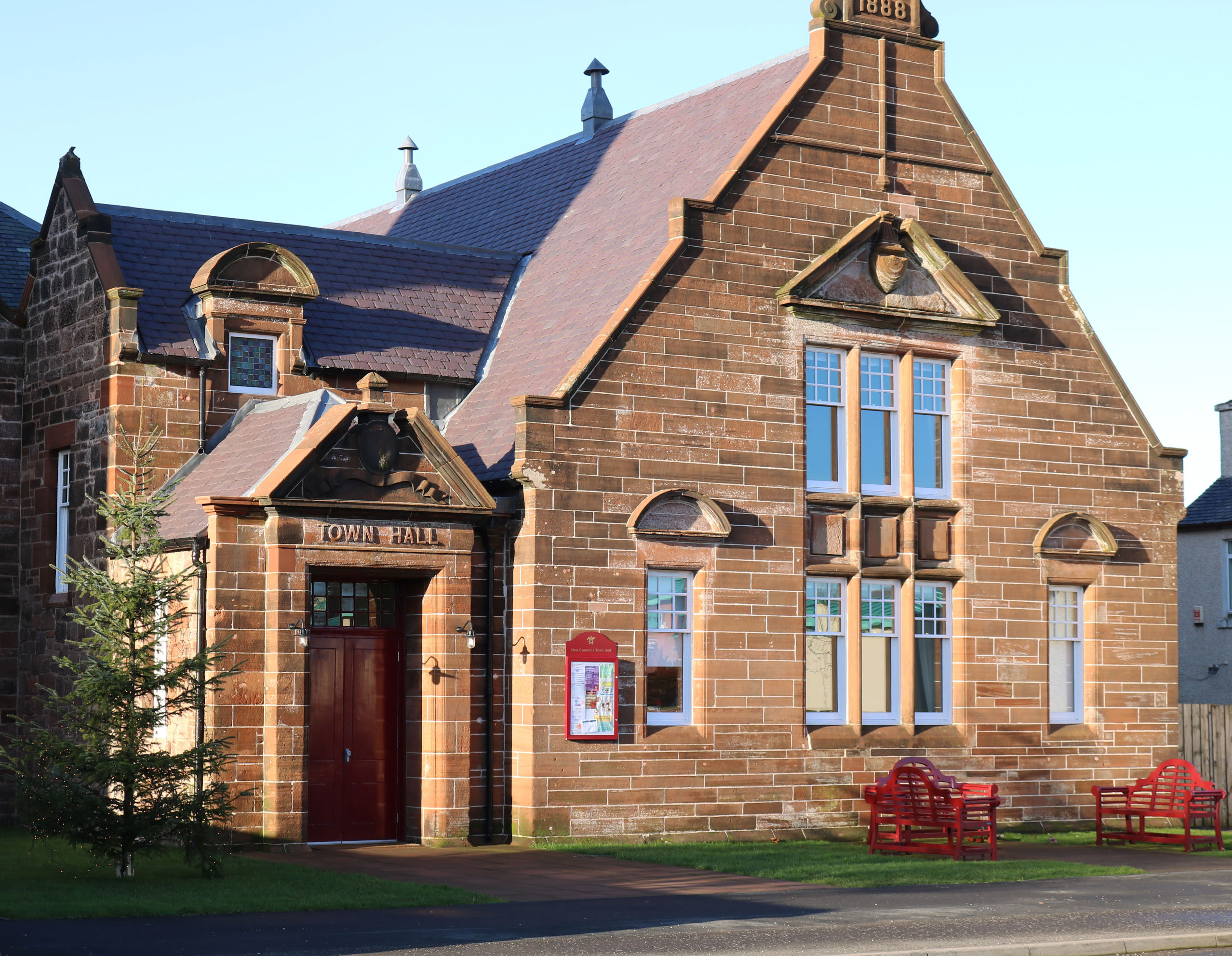
New Cumnock Town Hall

=== Early history ===
During the Roman period Romans roads passed through the areas, hinting at some kind of presence.

One of the first mentions of the village was when Patrick Dunbar of Comenagh signed the Ragman Roll of 1296.

Blind Harry's poem The Actes and Deidis of the Illustre and Vallyeant Campioun Schir William Wallace placed William Wallace in and around the village in his heroic tales of the patriot, calling it Cumno.

In 1296, William Wallace and his men were forced to turn back from New Cumnock because the road at Corsencon had been destroyed. "At Corssencon the gait was spilt that tide" The main route from Nithsdale to Ayrshire passed by Corsencon hill in the east of the parish where since 1205 a toll and customs point had stood. Wallace's detour took him to Avondale (Strathhaven) where he and his men defeated an English force at Loudon Hill.

In May of the following year Wallace slew the English sheriff of Lanark and soon after Blind Harry places Wallace and his men at New Cumnock again. "To the Blak Crag in Cumno past agayne, His houshauld set with men of mekill mayne, Thre monethis thar he dwellyt in gud rest".

Wallace’s household at Blak Crag, is in the lands of Blackcraig in the upper reaches of the Afton Water. In September 1297 Wallace had joined forces with Sir Andrew Murray and defeated the English army at Stirling Bridge. In the spring and early summer of 1298, Wallace, now Sir William and Guardian of Scotland, spent time consolidating his position, and this may be the period of Harry’s ‘three months rest’, i.e. rest from warfare. It was also during this period that Wallace paid a visit to his Uncle Sir Ranald Craufurd in Ayr, before - "In Cumno syne till his duellyng went he".

The last place Blind Harry has Wallace at before his capture and betrayal at Glasgow in July 1305 is at home in Blackraig, New Cumnock: "And Wallace past in Cumno with blith will, At the Blak Rok, quhar he was wont to be, Apon that sted a ryall house held he".

John Barbour in his epic work The Bruce tells how Robert the Bruce took refuge in Cumnock in 1306, where it was "straitast", i.e. steepest, a reference to Blackcraig and Craigbraneoch hills in the upper reaches of Glen Afton, New Cumnock.

=== Later history ===
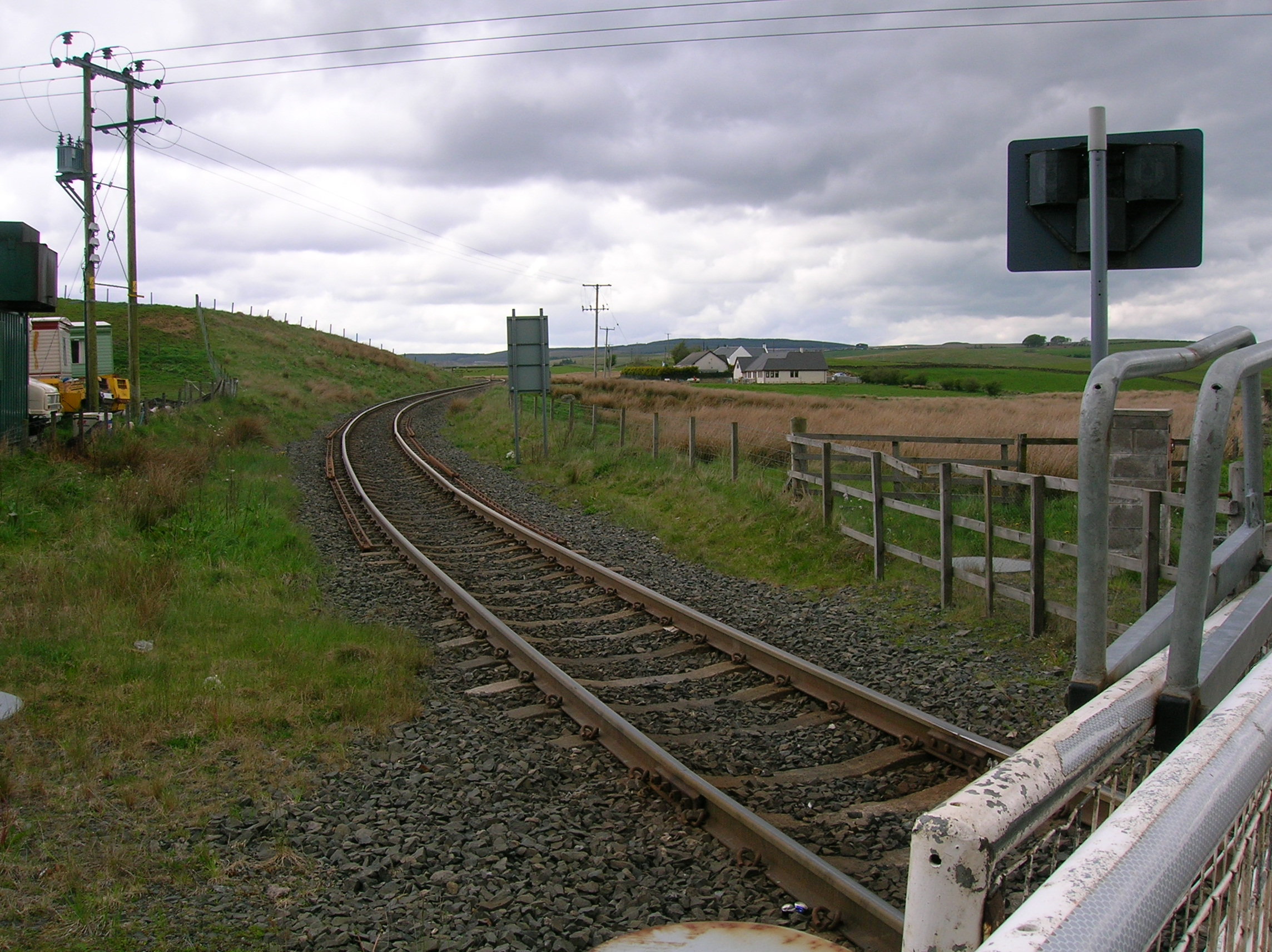
Rigghead Opencast rail link near New Cumnock.

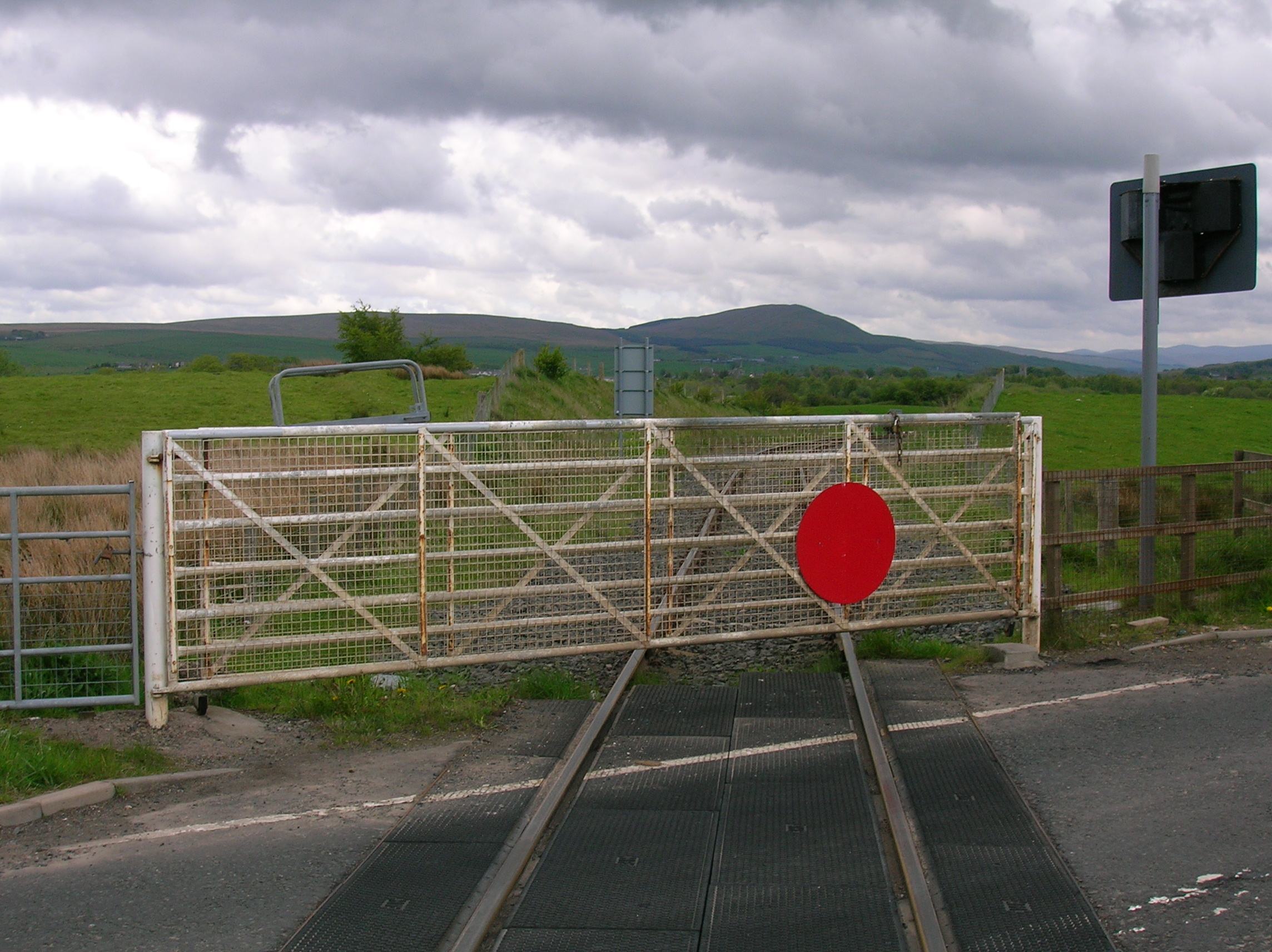
Rigghead opencast level crossing.

The name of the settlement changed through time, referred to as Cumnock Castle on Timothy Pont's map of Ayrshire c. 1600 CE. In 1509, Cumnock was made a burgh of barony and a market began at Cumnock Kirk, six miles (ten kilometres) northwest of (New) Cumnock Castle. In 1659, a new kirk was built near (New) Cumnock Castle and became known as the New Kirk of Cumnock, now called the Auld Kirk of New Cumnock. Cumnock Kirk became known as Old Cumnock and is now known as Cumnock.

In the late 18th century, Burns was a frequent visitor to the town and made a few friends in the area. There are plaques (mainly donated by New Cumnock Burns Club) on several buildings in and around New Cumnock. In 1788, Burns wrote about Corsencon Hill, referring to it as Parnassus Hill - in Greek mythology, Parnassus Hill was where Apollo slew the giant serpent or Python.

New Cumnock Town Hall was designed by Allan Stevenson and completed in 1889.

In 1950, thirteen people were killed in a mining disaster at the Knockshinnoch Castle Colliery; a film was made about the disaster called The Brave Don't Cry. The Scottish Wildlife Trust took over the former colliery site and turned it into a wetland reserve with paths.

== Transport ==
Public transport links include the New Cumnock railway station on the Glasgow South Western Line and the A76 Kilmarnock to Dumfries trunk road.

== Sport ==
The local football club is Glenafton Athletic, who play at Loch Park and compete in the West of Scotland League Premier Division. Former players include Ted McMinn.

== Notable people ==
- George Armour, Healthcare executive
- Billy Dodds, footballer
- Tom Hamilton, footballer
- Tom Hunter, businessman
- Sandy McGinn, footballer
- Sam McKnight, celebrity hairstylist
- Colin McLatchie, footballer
- Thomas McCreight aka. Tom Crate, footballer at Newcastle United

== Views in and around New Cumnock ==
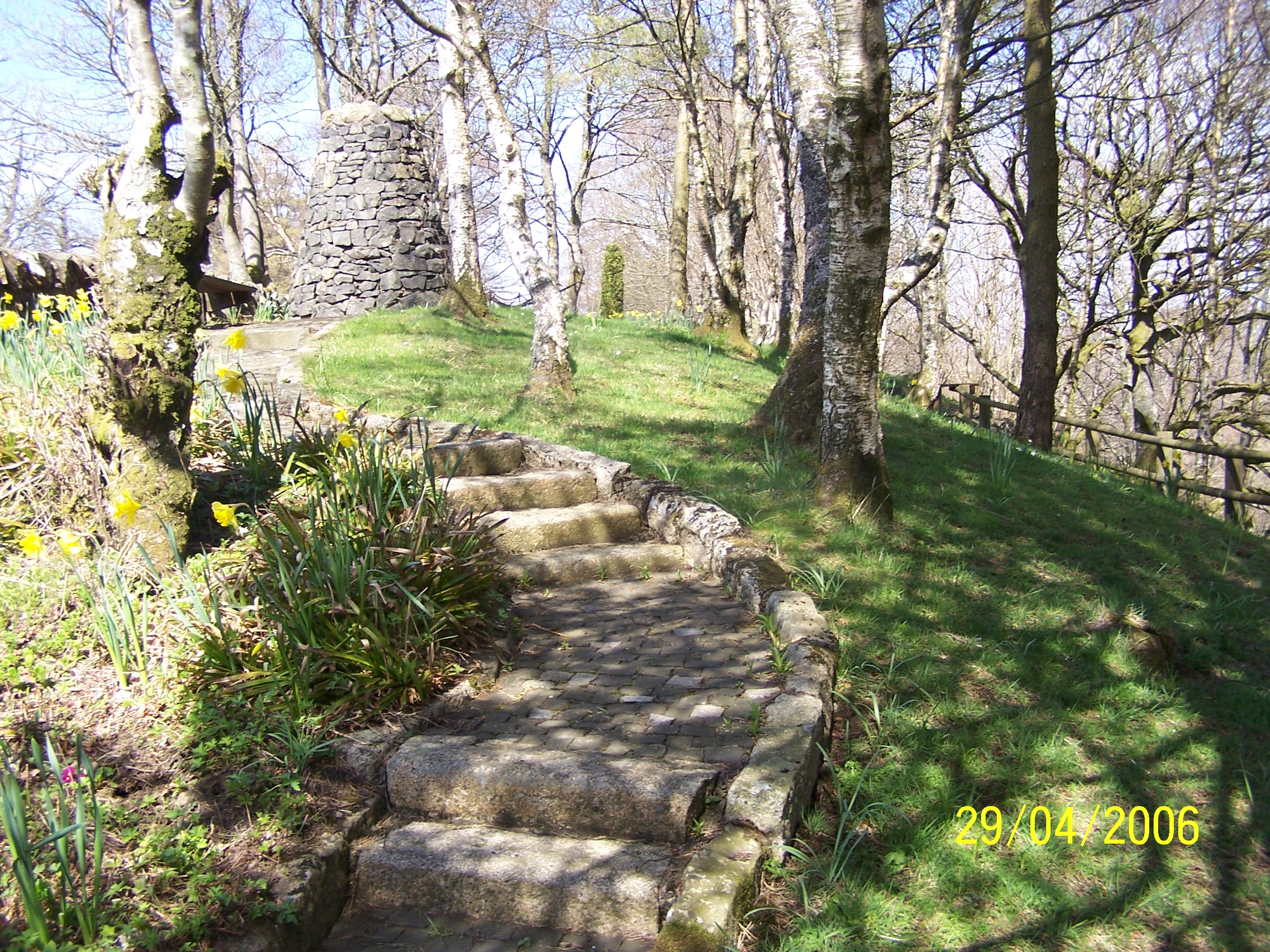
Burns Cairn - River Afton

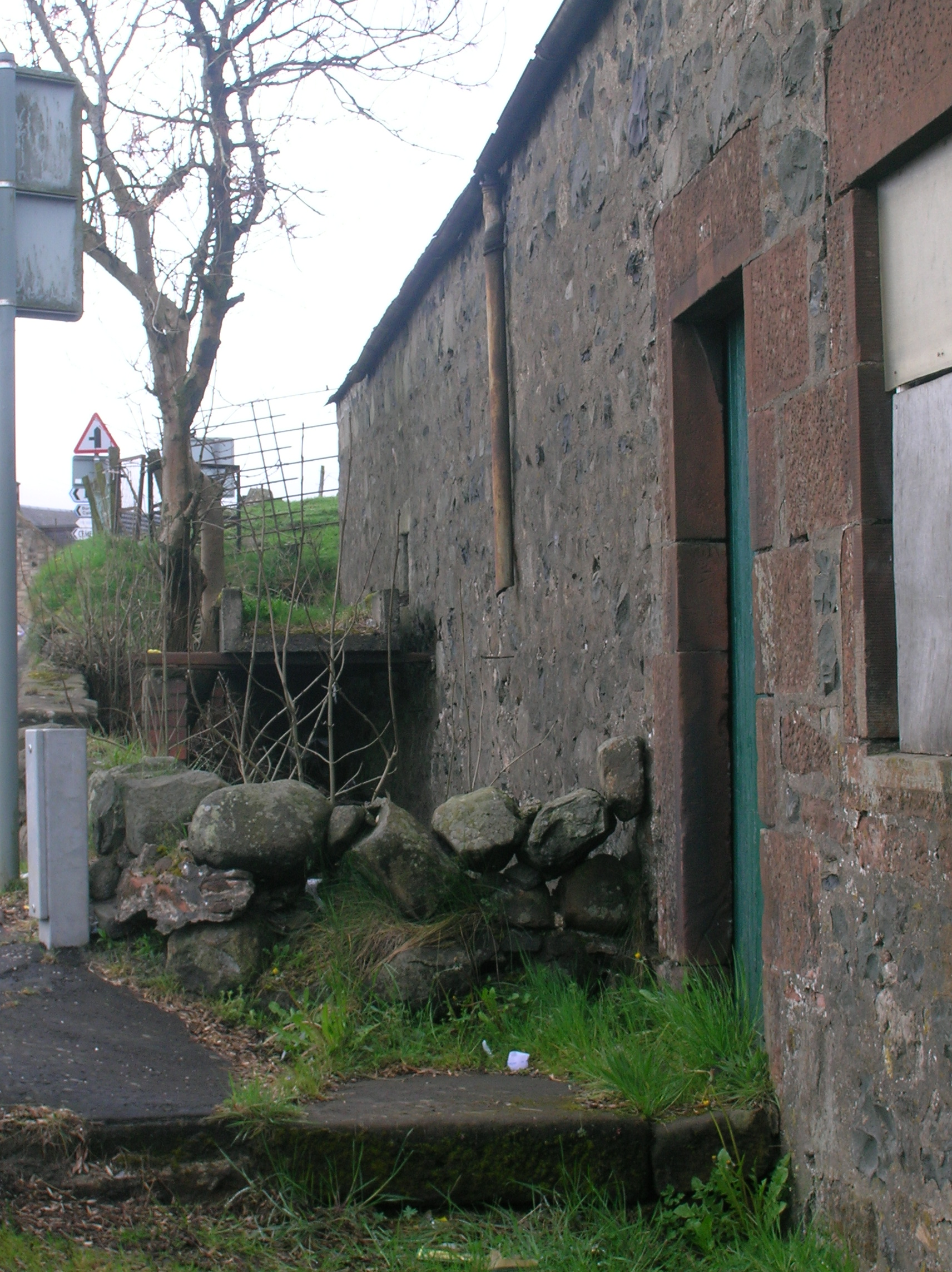
Old New Cumnock Mill

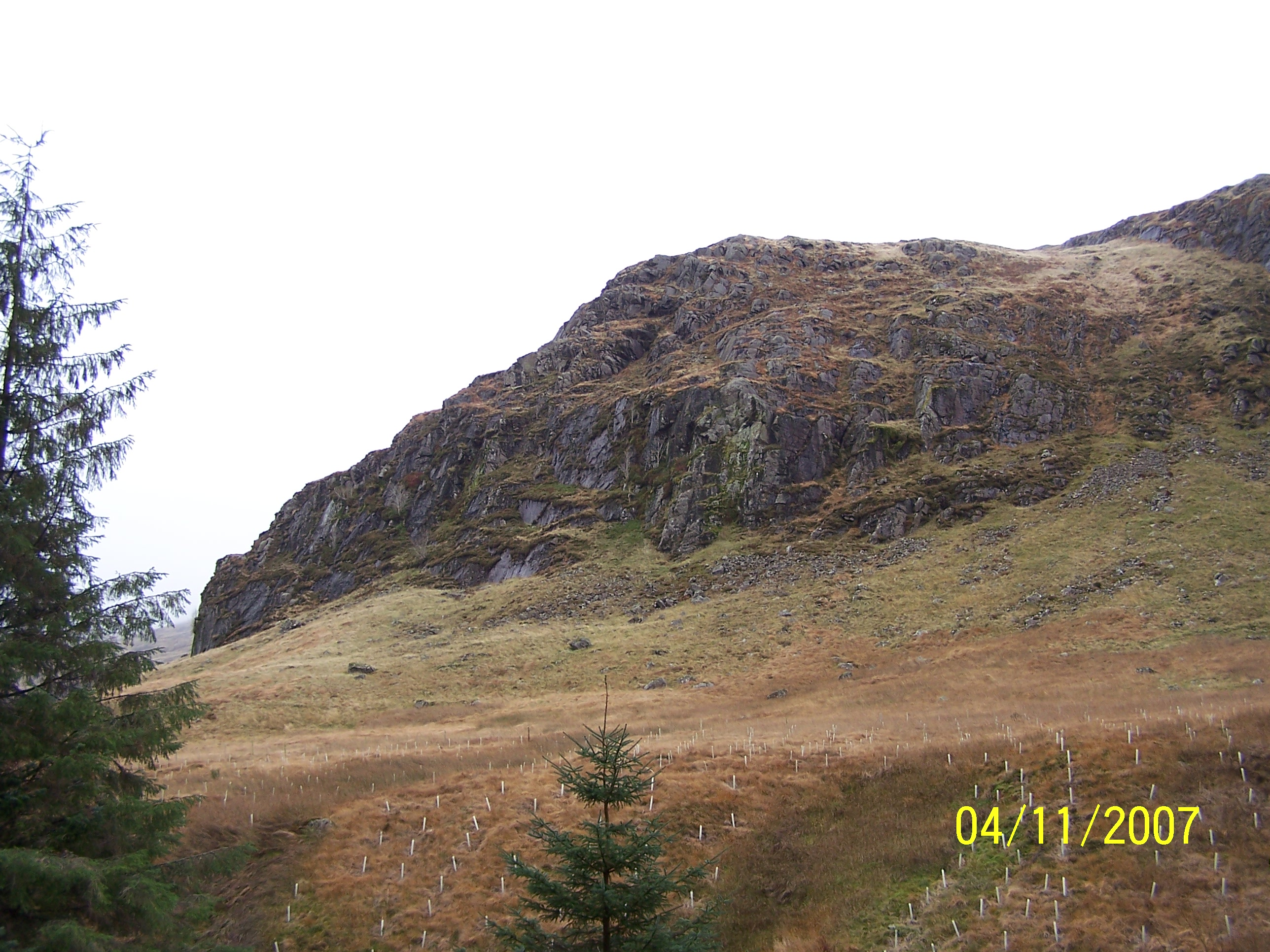
Afton Reservoir

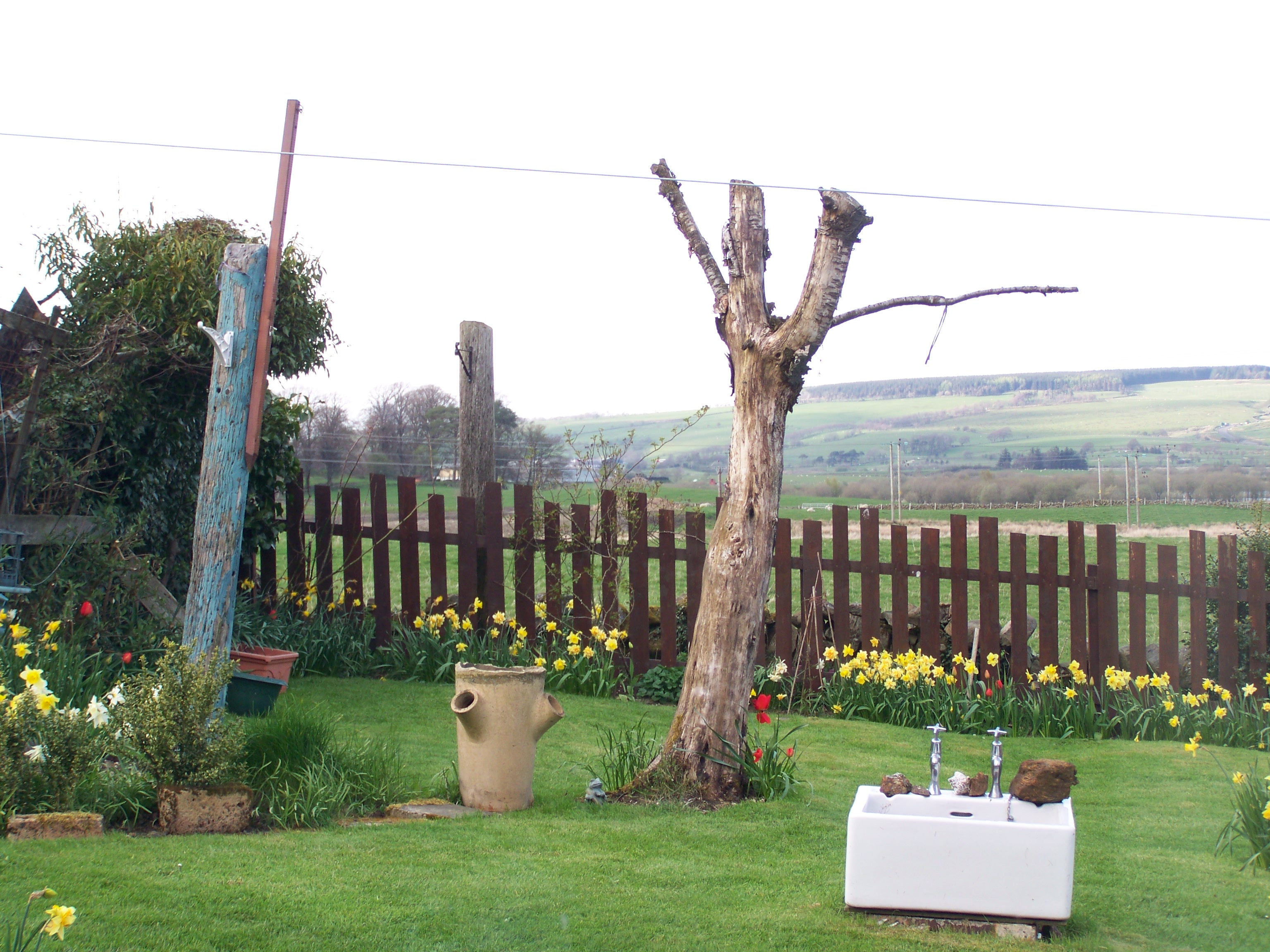
New Cumnock Garden

== See also ==
- List of places in East Ayrshire
- Loch o' th' Lowes, New Cumnock
- Black Loch, New Cumnock
- Creoch Loch
- Deil's Dyke - A linear earthwork.
