= List of listed buildings in New Cumnock, East Ayrshire =

This is a list of listed buildings in the parish of New Cumnock in East Ayrshire, Scotland.

== List ==
Name	Location	Date Listed	Grid Ref. (Note: Sometimes known as OSGB36, the grid reference (where provided) is based on the British national grid reference system used by the Ordnance Survey. • "Guide to National Grid". Ordnance Survey. • "Get-a-map". Ordnance Survey.)	Geo-coordinates	Notes	LB Number (Note: Historic Environment Scotland assign a unique alphanumeric identifier to each designated site in Scotland, for listed buildings this always begins with "LB", for example "LB12345".)	Image
Mossmark Of Oldmill				55°23′39″N 4°11′08″W	Category C(S)	14249	Upload Photo
Nith Bridge				55°24′04″N 4°10′59″W	Category B	14248	Upload another image
15 And 17 Castle, Town Hall And Police Station				55°23′46″N 4°11′05″W	Category C(S)	50128	Upload another image
Ruins Of Old Church And Graveyard				55°23′54″N 4°11′05″W	Category B	14247	Upload Photo
East Polquhirter				55°23′38″N 4°09′22″W	Category C(S)	14250	Upload Photo
Martyrs Parish Church				55°23′46″N 4°11′05″W	Category B	14246	Upload another image

== Key ==
The scheme for classifying buildings in Scotland is:

- Category A: "buildings of national or international importance, either architectural or historic; or fine, little-altered examples of some particular period, style or building type."
- Category B: "buildings of regional or more than local importance; or major examples of some particular period, style or building type, which may have been altered."
- Category C: "buildings of local importance; lesser examples of any period, style, or building type, as originally constructed or moderately altered; and simple traditional buildings which group well with other listed buildings."

In March 2016 there were 47,288 listed buildings in Scotland. Of these, 8% were Category A, and 50% were Category B, with the remaining 42% being Category C.

== See also ==
- List of listed buildings in East Ayrshire
