= New Cumnock Town Hall =

Municipal building in New Cumnock, Scotland

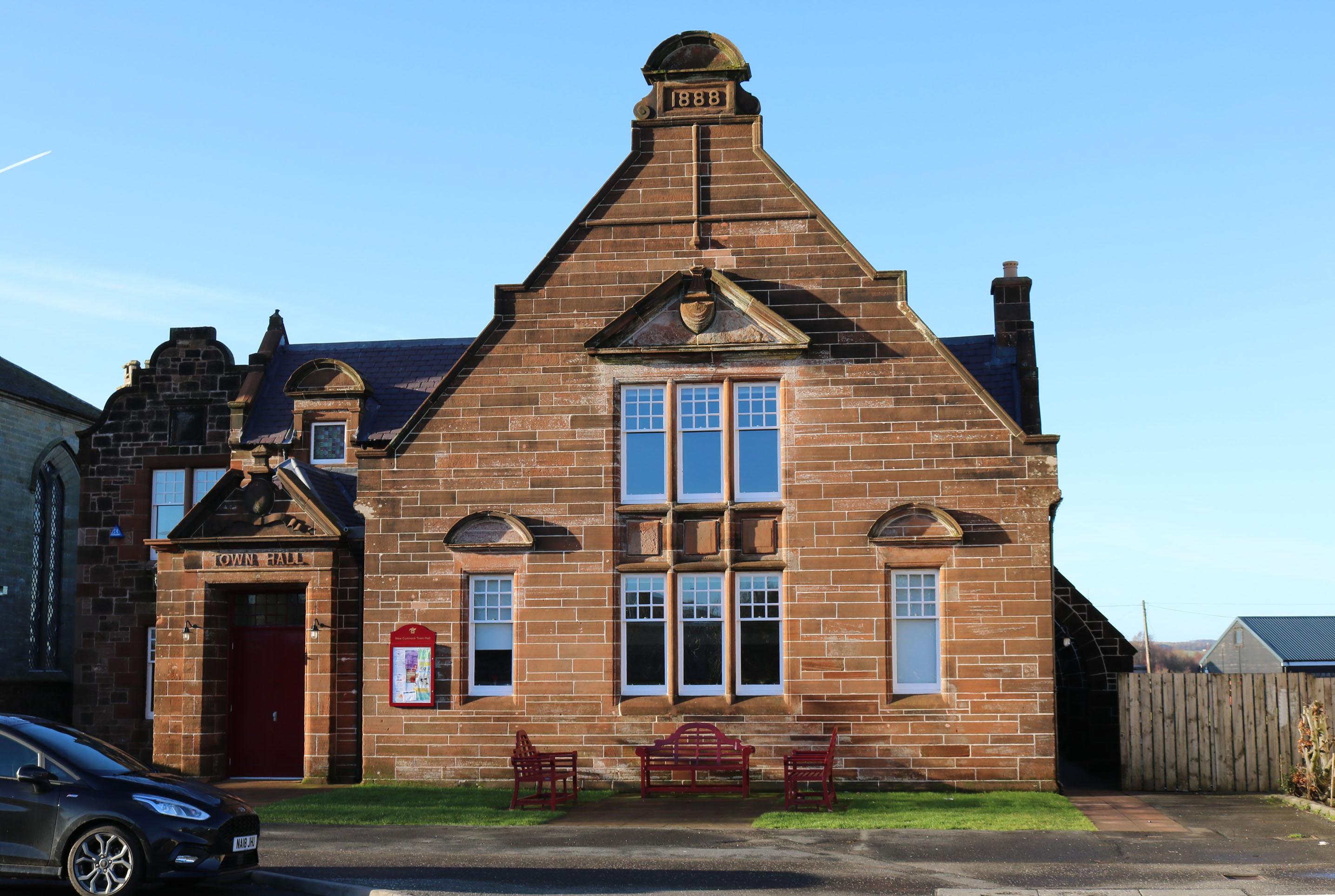
- New Cumnock Town Hall

- Shown in East Ayrshire
- 55.3962°N 4.1846°W
- Location: Castle, New Cumnock

History
- Built: 1889

Site notes
- Architect: Allan Stevenson
- Architectural style: Queen Anne style

Listed Building – Category C(S)
- Official name: Town Hall And Police Station, 15 And 17 Castle
- Designated: 20 June 2005
- Reference no.: LB50128

New Cumnock Town Hall is a municipal building in Castle, New Cumnock, East Ayrshire, Scotland. The structure, which is used as a community events venue, is a Category C listed building.

== History ==
Following significant population growth, largely associated with the mining industry, a group of local businessmen decided to raise finance for the building of a town hall. The site they selected formed part of the glebe, a plot of land adjacent to New Cumnock Parish Church. The foundation stone for the new building was laid by Mrs Shaw, the wife of a local solicitor and factor to the Marquess of Bute, Charles George Shaw, on 23 June 1888. It was designed by Allan Stevenson of Ayr in the Queen Anne style, built in red sandstone at a cost of £750 and was officially opened by Charles George Shaw on 20 February 1889.

The design involved an asymmetrical main frontage with five bays facing onto Castle. The left hand bay, which was significantly recessed, contained bi-partite mullioned windows on both floors with a Dutch gable above. The second bay featured a doorway flanked by pilasters supporting an entablature and an open pediment with a cartouche in the tympanum. The right-hand section of three bays, which was projected forward and gabled, was fenestrated by tri-partite mullioned windows on both floors with an open pediment above the first-floor window. The outer bays in that section contained single windows with segmental pediments. Internally, the principal room was the main assembly hall, which had a seating capacity of 480 people.

The building was acquired by the parish council in 1904: it was used for concerts and theatrical performances for much of the first half of the 20th century and served as the home of the local contingent of the Home Guard during the Second World War. However, following the industrial decline of the town in the second half of the 20th century, the building became underused and its fabric began deteriorating.

Following an approach to the Duke of Rothesay and the Prince's Foundation, which had recently completed the restoration of Dumfries House, ownership of the building was transferred to the Great Steward of Scotland's Dumfries House Trust in 2015. After some initial works had been completed with financial support from Hans Rausing, a comprehensive restoration of the building, financed by the Mansour Foundation and the Hunter Foundation started in April 2016. The work was carried out by contractors, Taylor and Fraser, and involved extensive treatment for both wet rot and dry rot as well as extensive repairs to the masonry. After the works had been completed, the building was officially re-opened by the Duke of Rothesay on 23 October 2016. The building subsequently reverted to serving as a community events venue as well as the regular meeting place of the New Cumnock Community Council.

== See also ==
- List of listed buildings in New Cumnock, East Ayrshire
