= Sam McKnight =

British hairstylist

Sam McKnight MBE
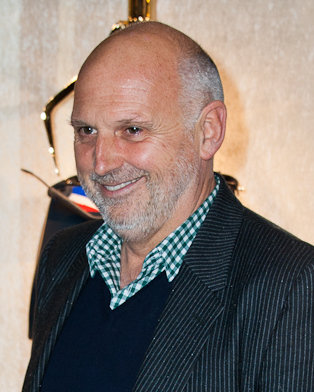
- McKnight in a Fendi store opening in 2014
- Born: 13 May 1955 (age 70); New Cumnock, Scotland
- Occupation: Hairstylist

Samuel McKnight MBE (born 13 May 1955) is a hairstylist known for his work with celebrities including Princess Diana, Kate Moss and Lady Gaga, and for his collaborations with fashion houses like Chanel, Fendi, Balmain and Burberry.

== Personal life ==
McKnight was born in New Cumnock, Ayrshire, Scotland, into a working-class family. His father was a miner and his mother was employed by the local Co-op shop. He initially worked as a window cleaner, van driver and trainee teacher before becoming an assistant at a local hairdressers. He moved to London in the early 1970s.

== Career ==
On his move to London, McKnight was employed at the upmarket hair salon Molton Brown. He had his first editorial shoot with Vogue in 1977, and went on to become an independent "session stylist", specialising in high-profile editorial shoots. He moved to New York in the early 1980s.

McKnight created Princess Diana's iconic short, slicked-back hairstyle for a 1990 Vogue magazine shoot and was her personal hair stylist for seven years. He also worked extensively with the supermodels Linda Evangelista, Christy Turlington, Kate Moss and Naomi Campbell throughout the 1990s. McKnight has contributed to more than 190 cover shoots for the various international versions of Vogue magazine alone. He styled Madonna for the cover of her album Bedtime Stories (1994) and Lady Gaga for her album Born This Way (2011).

== Honours and recognition ==
McKnight is the recipient of the Lifetime Achievement Award at both the Scottish Fashion Awards and Creative Head Awards. In November 2016, Somerset House hosted a retrospective showcasing four decades of McKnight's work.

McKnight was appointed Member of the Order of the British Empire (MBE) in the 2023 New Year Honours for services to the fashion and beauty industries.
