= Loch o' th' Lowes (New Cumnock) =

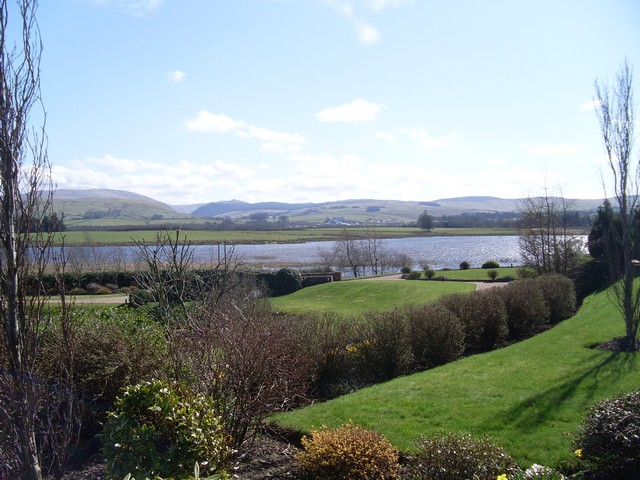
- View of the loch from the Lochside House Hotel

- Location within Scotland
- Location: East Ayrshire, Scotland
- Coordinates: 55°24′18.6″N 4°12′33.7″W
- Type: Freshwater loch
- Primary inflows: Creoch Loch, Lochill Burn, rainfall and runoff
- Primary outflows: Lochside Burn
- Max. length: 600 m (2,000 ft)
- Max. width: 550 m (1,800 ft)

The Loch o' th' Lowes, also called Lochside Loch or Meikle Creoch Loch, is a small freshwater loch near New Cumnock in East Ayrshire, Scotland. It is one of three linked lochs, the others being Creoch Loch and Black Loch. The name means "loch of the lochs", lowes being an obsolete plural of the word loch.

== The loch ==
McMichael records that in wet weather the three lochs combined as one, and suggests that until the trap dyke on the River Nith below Corsancone Hill wore down, the loch covered the whole area as far as the watershed at Sannock Hill and had a shape and surface area similar to Loch Doon.

The name Lochside is derived from the shooting lodge, now a hotel (2011), built by the Marquis of Bute.

The "Runner" is a deep and broad ditch that was dug many years back to link the three lochs of Lowes, Black, and Creoch.

Islets

The 19th century OS maps indicated two islets, one small and close to the southern lochshore and the other larger and near the western lochshore.

== Cartographic evidence ==
Robert Gordon's map of 1636–52 shows a single loch with an outflow only, running into the River Nith. Blaeu's map of 1654, based on the earlier map by Timothy Pont, also shows a single loch named Loch of the Lowis; however, a Black Loch "section" is recorded at the northern end. John Adair's map of 1685 shows a single 'L of Lon'. Roy's map of 1747 shows a loch named Loch Side. Armstrong's map of 1775 shows a "Lows" loch with no islands indicated. Thomson's 1832 map shows a Lochside Loch with one inflow and a single island.

The 1857 OS map shows a Lochside Loch with two islets and a peninsula that is nearly a third islet. A significant area of wetland adjoins the loch with a minor ironstone pit located within it near Meikle Creoch Farm.

== Uses ==
The owners of Lochside House at one time held the sporting rights of the loch. A boathouse was located at Lochside. Perch, pike, and eels were common in the loch. The approximate depth of the loch was four feet over quite a large area, making swimming relatively safe.

== Natural history ==
A pair of great crested grebes nested here in the 20th century and other species present were the reed warbler, coaltop, snipe, meadow pippet, lapwing, etc.

== Micro-history ==
The Earl of Dumfries proposed to make a "cut" from the River Nith in New Cumnock through the Loch o' th' Lowes and Creoch Loch to the Black Loch in order to provide a supply of water to power a factory he intended to build on the Glaisnock Water. This would have resulted in part of the waters of the River Nith flowing onto the Clyde rather than the Solway. However, the development was never carried to fruition.

Fanciful imagination has pictured a trout swimming up the River Ayr, passing into the Lugar Water at Barskimming, entering the Black Loch via the Glaisnock Water and thence into the Black Loch. The second outflow from the loch would carry the trout into Creoch Loch, then into the Loch o' th' Lowes, the River Nith and finally into the Solway Firth after a journey of around 70 miles (110 kilometres).

Love records that a witch, transformed into a hare, was shot by a young man at Lowes Farm and the inevitable curse was prevented by the firing of a piece of silver at the exact spot where the animal had been wounded.
