= Creoch Loch =

Coordinates: 55°24′33.8″N 4°13′5.0″W

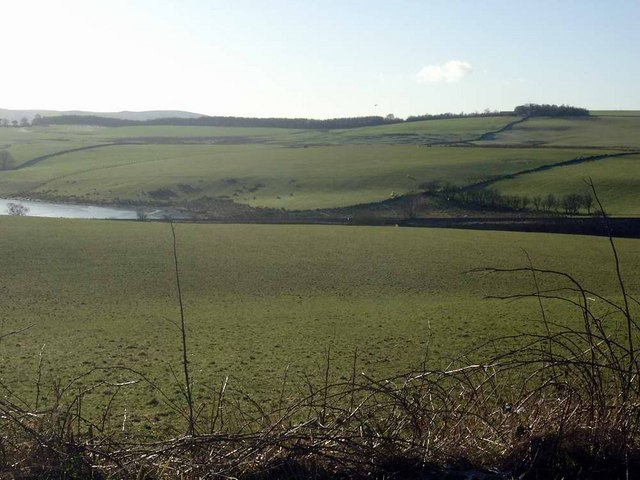
- Creoch Loch and the railway from the main road

- The location of Creoch Loch, East Ayrshire
- Location: New Cumnock, East Ayrshire, Scotland
- Type: Freshwater loch
- Primary inflows: A burn from the Black Loch, Rainfall and runoff
- Primary outflows: To the Loch o' th' Lowes
- Basin countries: Scotland
- Max. length: 600 m (2,000 ft)
- Max. width: 250 m (820 ft)
- Islands: One islet (19th century)
- Settlements: New Cumnock

Creoch Loch (NS 59259 15615), previously known as Little Creoch Loch, is a freshwater loch in the Parish of New Cumnock in the East Ayrshire Council Area between Cumnock and New Cumnock, Scotland. It is located in a glacial kettle hole and is one of three linked lochs.

== The loch ==
McMichael records that in wet weather the three lochs combined as one and suggests that until the trap dyke on the River Nith below Corsancone Hill wore down the Cum Loch covered the whole area as far as the watershed at Sannock Hill and had a shape and surface area similar to Loch Doon.

Creoch Loch is recorded as being just over 600 metres long. Robert Gordon's map of 1636-52 shows a single loch with an outflow to the River Nith. Blaeu's map of 1654, based on the earlier map by Timothy Pont, also shows a single loch named Loch of the Lowis [sic], however a Black Loch 'section' is recorded at the northern end. Two dwellings named 'Krioch' are shown on this map, an Over and a North Krioch.

The Creoch Loch is said to take its name from Creoch Farm which in turn is named for the Gaelic word crioch, meaning 'boundary'.

The 'Runner' is a deep and broad ditch that was dug many years back to link the three lochs of Lowes, Black, and Creoch.

The Lowes Burn was canalised and diverted away from the loch.

=== Cartographic evidence ===
Blaeu's map of 1654, based on the earlier map by Timothy Pont, shows a single loch named Loch of the Lowis [sic], with a Black Loch 'section' recorded at the northern end. Two dwellings named 'Krioch' are shown on this map, an Over and a North Krioch. John Adair's map of 1685 shows a single 'L of Lon'. Roy's map of 1747 shows the loch near Little Creoch.

Armstrong's map of 1775, shows the loch with Lochside erroneously located on its shoreline and with no islands. Thomson's 1832 map shows two additional minor inflows.

The 1897 OS map shows no islets and no boathouse. A path at this point also runs from Little Creoch Farm to Lochside House with stepping stones over the loch outflow, the 'runner' that passes into the Loch o' th' Lowes.

== Uses ==
Curling matches were held on the loch in 1829 and 1861, matches being Auchinleck vs Cumnock. A boat house is shown on the 1857 OS map, near the northern end of the loch, and close to the inflow from the Black Loch. Regular local curling matches were held on the loch, usually at Christmas or New Years day.

The 'Runner' is a deep and broad ditch that was dug many years back to link the three lochs of Lowes, Black, and Creoch.

== Micro-history ==
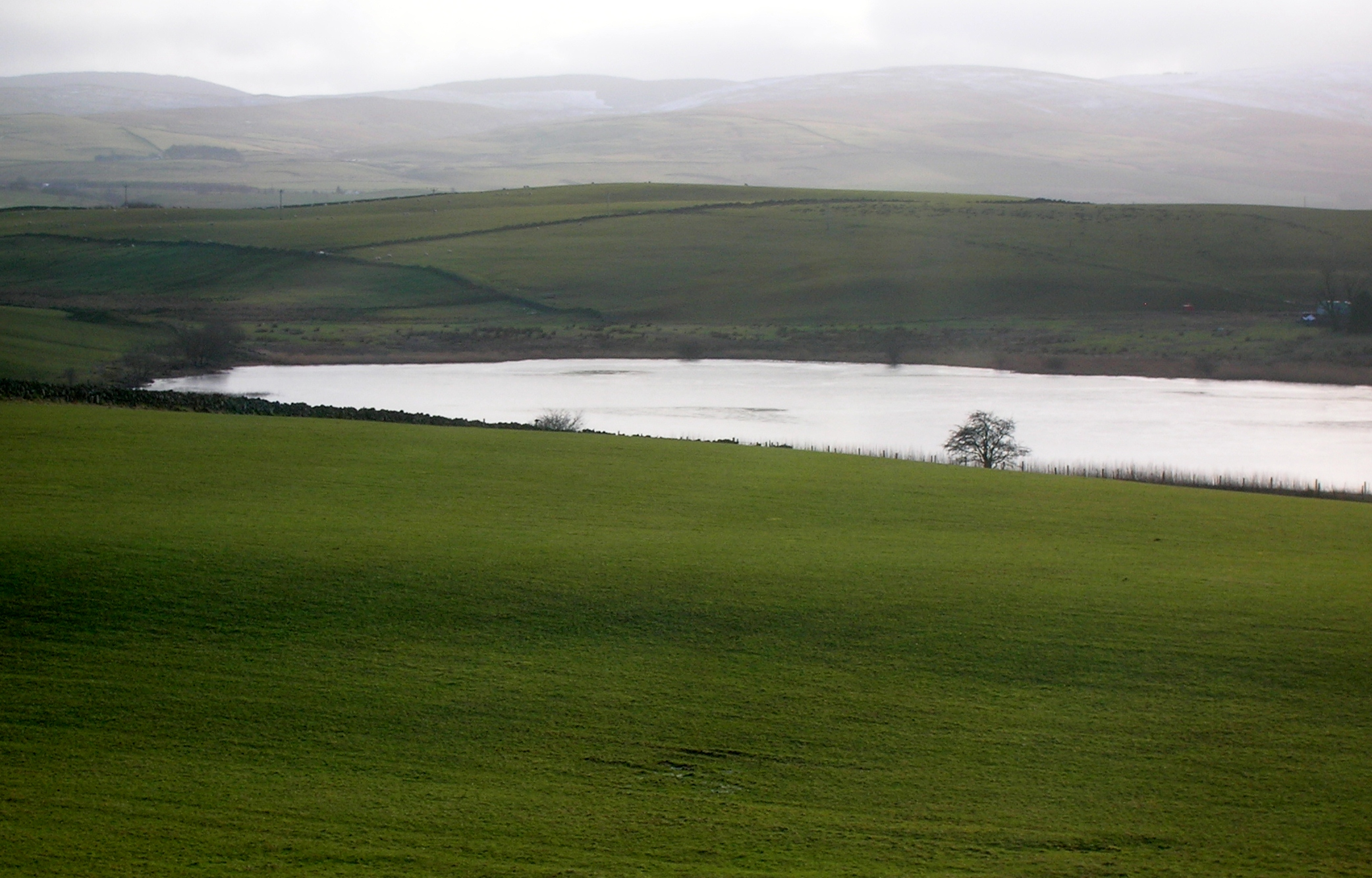
Creoch Loch from near Mid Lowes Farm.

The Earl of Dumfries proposed to make a 'cut' from the River Nith in New Cumnock through the Loch o' th' Lowes and Creoch Loch to the Black Loch in order to provide a supply of water to power a factory he intended to build on the Glaisnock Water. This would have resulted in part of the waters of the River Nith flowing onto the Clyde rather than the Solway, however the development was never carried to fruition.

Fanciful imagination has pictured a trout swimming up the River Ayr, passing into the Lugar Water at Barskimming, entering the Black Loch via the Glaisnock Water and thence into the Black Loch. The second outflow from the loch would carry the trout into Creoch Loch, then into the Loch o' th' Lowes, the River Nith and finally into the Solway Firth after a journey of around seventy miles.

The 1864 OS map shows the main line railway cutting between Black Loch and Creoch Loch, running from the east to the western shore of Creoch Loch.

== See also ==
- Black Loch, New Cumnock
- Loch o' th' Lowes, New Cumnock
