= Black Loch (New Cumnock) =

Coordinates: 55°25′10.5″N 4°13′41.6″W

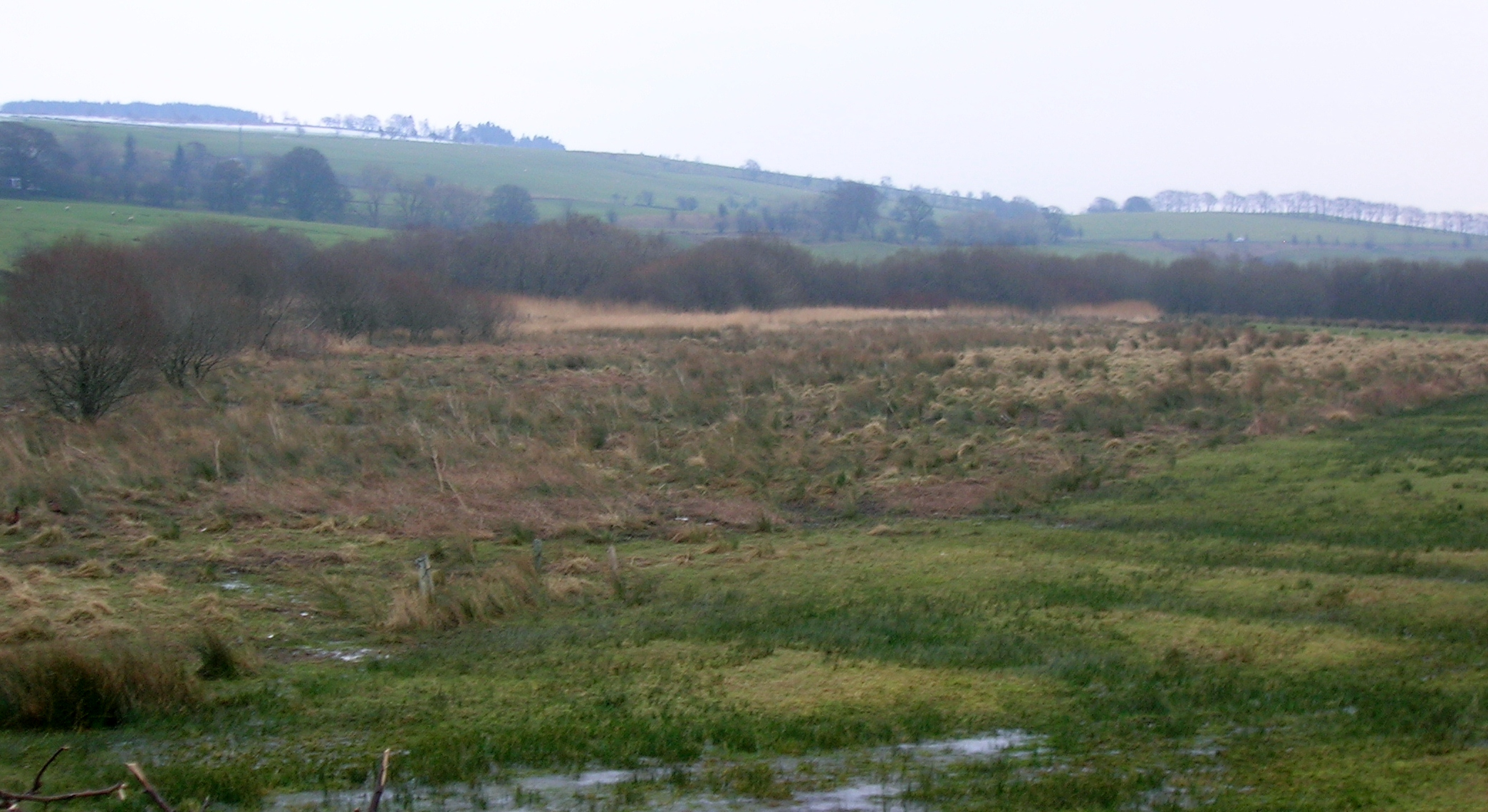
- Black Loch

- The location of Black Loch, East Ayrshire
- Location: East Ayrshire, Scotland
- Type: Freshwater loch
- Primary inflows: Polquhap & Segsy Burns, Rainfall and runoff
- Primary outflows: Blackloch Burn
- Basin countries: Scotland
- Max. length: 400 m (1,300 ft)
- Max. width: 200 m (660 ft)
- Islands: None
- Settlements: New Cumnock

Black Loch (NS 59057 161720) is a freshwater loch, named from its dark waters, situated in the East Ayrshire Council Area of Scotland, between Cumnock and New Cumnock, lying in a glacial Kettle Hole mainly within the Parish of New Cumnock, with a small portion protruding into Old Cumnock Parish. It is said to be one of only two lochs or lakes in the world that have outflows running to two separate destinations. The 'Runner' is a deep and broad ditch that was dug many years ago to link the three lochs of Lowes, Black, and Creoch.

== The loch ==
The Black Loch, just over 400 metres long, is the deepest of three linked lochs within the Parish of New Cumnock. It is unusual in that its northerly outflow is into the Glaisnock Water, flowing into the Lugar Water and the River Ayr, finally emptying into the Firth of Clyde, while the southerly outflow runs into the River Nith and thence into the Solway Firth. The Segsy Burn is a minor inflow from the north-west, and the Polquhap enters at the north-west, rising from Glaisnock Moss.

McMichael records that in wet weather the three lochs combined as one and suggests that until the trap dyke on the River Nith below Corsancone Hill wore down, the Cum Loch covered the whole area as far as the watershed at Sannock Hill and had a shape and surface area similar to Loch Doon.

=== Cartographic evidence ===
Robert Gordon's map of 1636-52 shows only a single loch in the area with an outflow only, running into the River Nith. Blaeu's map of 1654, based on the earlier map by Timothy Pont, also shows a single loch named Loch of the Lowis (sic), however a Black Loch 'section' is recorded at the northern end. John Adair's map of 1685 shows a single 'L of Lon'. Roy's map of 1747 does not show Black Loch, however it is clearly marked on Armstrong's map of 1775, with two islands erroneously indicated. Thomson's 1832 map shows three additional minor inflows.

== Lairds of Boreland ==
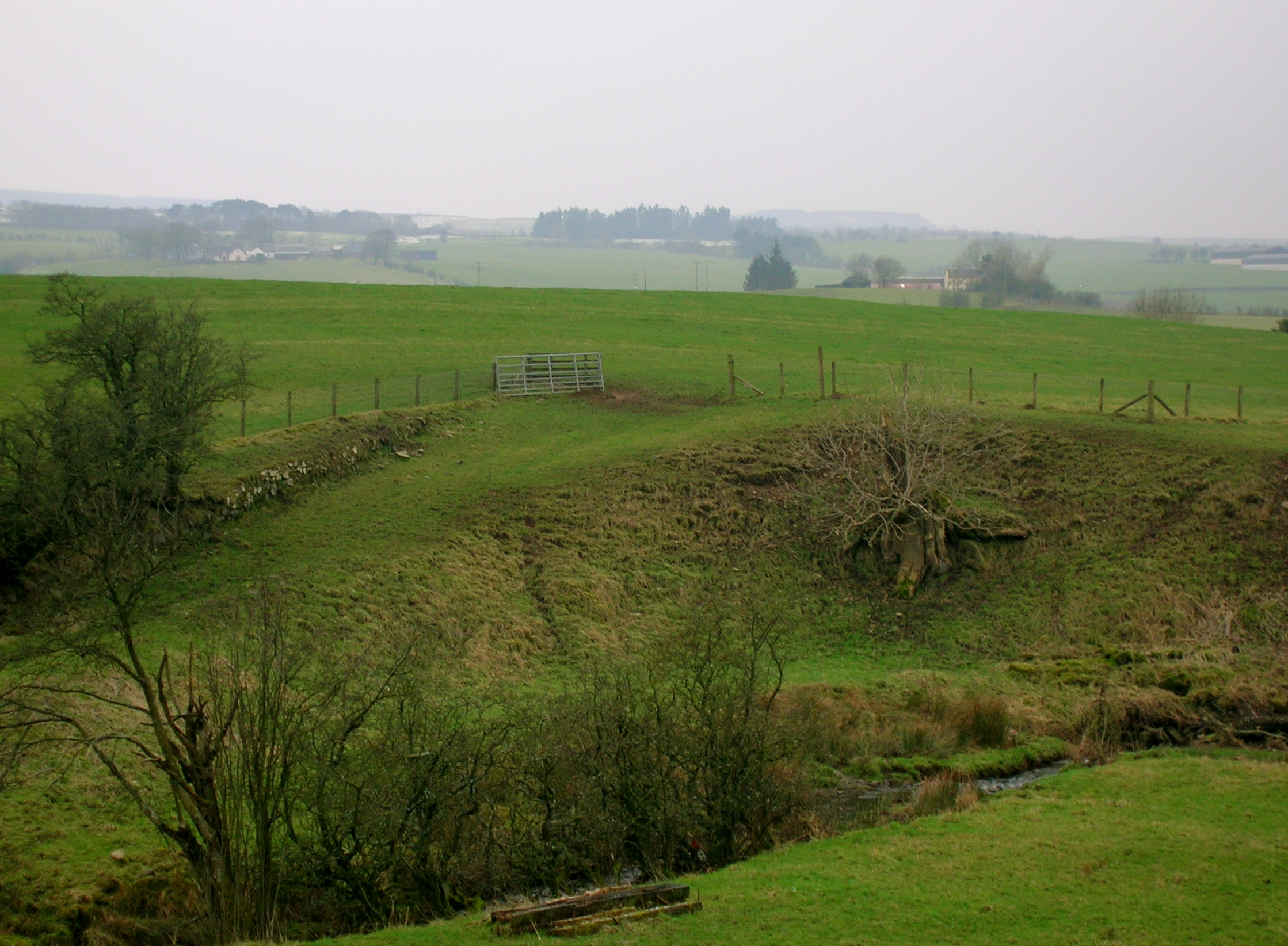
Entrance lane to old Borland Castle.

The loch lay within the Lands of Boreland, held by the Hamilton family since circa late 14th to early 15th centuries. A George Hailton of Boreland was the second son of Sir David Hamilton of Cadzow. The family held the lands until in 1669 Hugh Hamilton of Boreland left the lands to his grand-daughter Margaret, the heiress of this cadet branch of the family. Hugh Montgomerie of Prestwickshaws, a descendant of the Eglinton Montgomeries, married Margaret and sold his lands of Prestwickshaws to one Robert Wallace. The Montgomeries of Boreland held these lands until 1751 when the property passed to the Montgomeries of Coilsfield, who sold it to various parties. In 1790 the lands were purchased by the Earl of Dumfries, however by the 1860s the lands were owned by the Marquis of Bute.

== Uses ==
The Blackloch Burn, controlled by a sluice at the loch's northerly outflow, ran as a lade to the site of the old Borland Mill and its millpond. By 1895 the OS map shows the millpond in use a reservoir only and the loch with marginal vegetation around its periphery.

== Micro-history ==
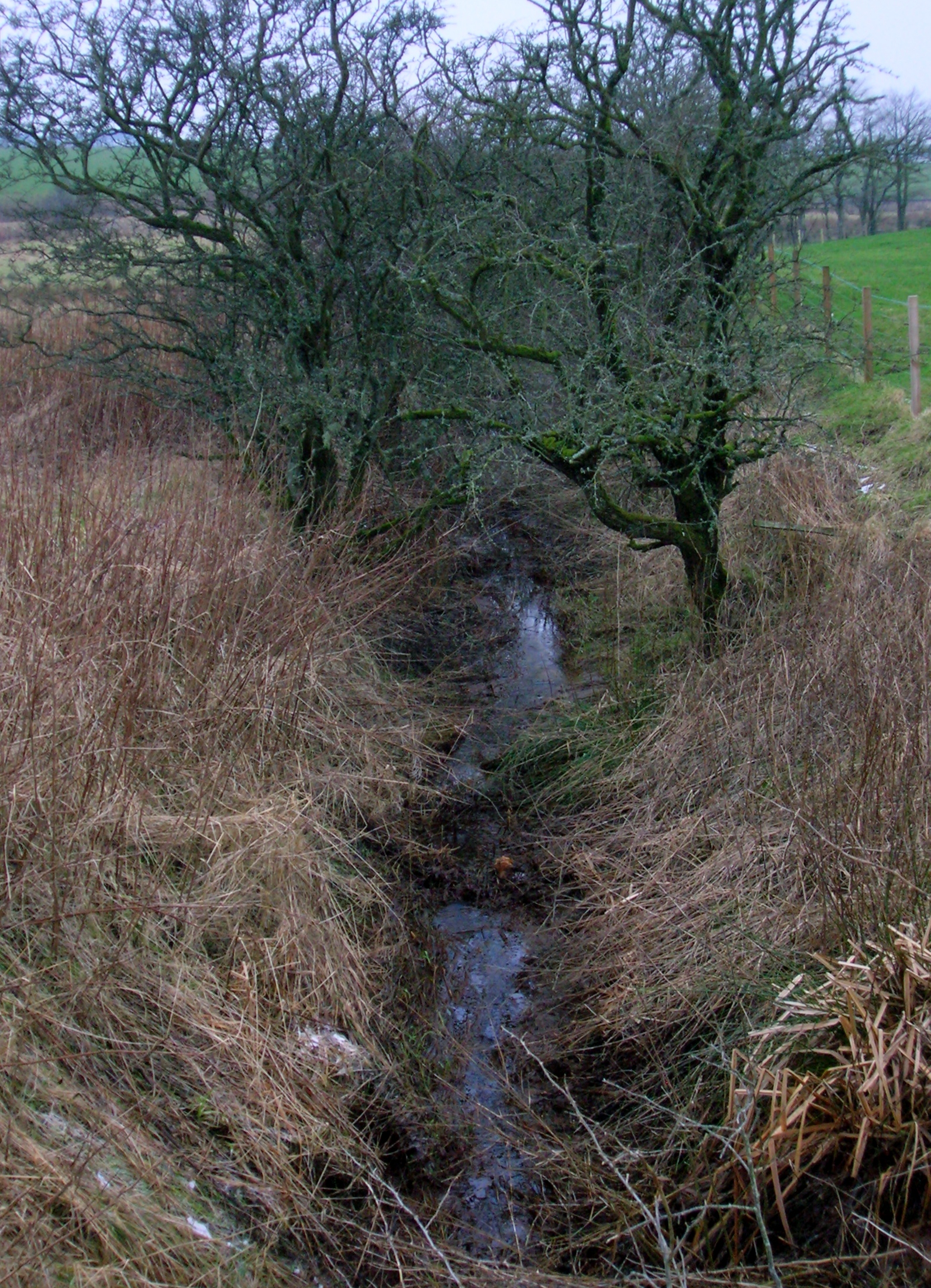
Old lade to Borland Mill from Black Loch.

The Earl of Dumfries proposed to make a 'cut' from the River Nith in New Cumnock through the Loch o' th' Lowes and Creoch Loch to the Black Loch in order to provide a supply of water to power a factory he intended to build on the Glaisnock Water. This would have resulted in part of the waters of the River Nith flowing onto the Clyde rather than the Solway, however the development was never carried to fruition.

Fanciful imagination has pictured a trout swimming up the River Ayr, passing into the Lugar Water at Barskimming, entering the Black Loch via the Glaisnock Water and thence into the Black Loch. The second outflow from the loch would carry the trout into Creoch Loch, then into the Loch o' th' Lowes, the River Nith and finally into the Solway Firth after a journey of around seventy miles.

== See also ==
- Creoch Loch
- Loch o' th' Lowes, New Cumnock
