= List of listed buildings in East Ayrshire =

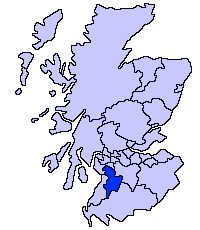
East Ayrshire shown within Scotland

This is a list of listed buildings in East Ayrshire. The list is split out by parish.

- List of listed buildings in Auchinleck, East Ayrshire
- List of listed buildings in Cumnock And Holmhead, East Ayrshire
- List of listed buildings in Dalmellington, East Ayrshire
- List of listed buildings in Dalrymple, East Ayrshire
- List of listed buildings in Darvel, East Ayrshire
- List of listed buildings in Dunlop, East Ayrshire
- List of listed buildings in Fenwick, East Ayrshire
- List of listed buildings in Galston, East Ayrshire
- List of listed buildings in Kilmarnock, East Ayrshire
- List of listed buildings in Kilmaurs, East Ayrshire
- List of listed buildings in Loudoun, East Ayrshire
- List of listed buildings in Mauchline, East Ayrshire
- List of listed buildings in Muirkirk, East Ayrshire
- List of listed buildings in New Cumnock, East Ayrshire
- List of listed buildings in Newmilns And Greenholm, East Ayrshire
- List of listed buildings in Ochiltree, East Ayrshire
- List of listed buildings in Old Cumnock, East Ayrshire
- List of listed buildings in Riccarton, East Ayrshire
- List of listed buildings in Sorn, East Ayrshire
- List of listed buildings in Stair, East Ayrshire
- List of listed buildings in Stewarton, East Ayrshire
- List of listed buildings in Straiton, East Ayrshire

== See also ==
- Scheduled monuments in East Ayrshire
