= List of listed buildings in Ochiltree, East Ayrshire =

This is a list of listed buildings in the parish of Ochiltree in East Ayrshire, Scotland.

== List ==
Name	Location	Date Listed	Grid Ref. (Note: Sometimes known as OSGB36, the grid reference (where provided) is based on the British national grid reference system used by the Ordnance Survey. • "Guide to National Grid". Ordnance Survey. • "Get-a-map". Ordnance Survey.)	Geo-coordinates	Notes	LB Number (Note: Historic Environment Scotland assign a unique alphanumeric identifier to each designated site in Scotland, for listed buildings this always begins with "LB", for example "LB12345".)	Image
Burnock Holm House				55°27′38″N 4°21′36″W	Category B	19687	Upload Photo
Nos. 78 And 80 Main Street				55°27′38″N 4°21′59″W	Category B	14317	Upload Photo
Nos. 86-98 (Even Nos.) Main Street				55°27′37″N 4°22′00″W	Category B	14318	Upload Photo
Nos 1-13 (Odd Numbers) Mill Street				55°27′43″N 4°21′40″W	Category B	14320	Upload Photo
Netherton				55°27′26″N 4°21′56″W	Category B	14325	Upload Photo
Drongan House				55°26′44″N 4°27′08″W	Category B	14328	Upload Photo
Head Inn, 5 Main Street				55°27′42″N 4°21′40″W	Category B	14335	Upload Photo
Nos. 69, 71 And 73 Main Street				55°27′36″N 4°21′59″W	Category B	14339	Upload Photo
No 34 Main Street				55°27′42″N 4°21′47″W	Category C(S)	14340	Upload Photo
Nos. 77-89 (Odd Numbers) No 89 Known As Orchard Park) Main St				55°27′35″N 4°22′03″W	Category B	19688	Upload Photo
Ochiltree Mill				55°27′53″N 4°21′42″W	Category C(S)	14323	Upload Photo
1,3 And 5 Burnock Street				55°27′42″N 4°21′38″W	Category B	14334	Upload another image
Burnock Bridge				55°27′39″N 4°21′35″W	Category B	14336	Upload Photo
53 Main Street Ochiltree				55°27′38″N 4°21′54″W	Category C(S)	14342	Upload Photo
63 Main Street Ochiltree				55°27′37″N 4°21′57″W	Category C(S)	14343	Upload Photo
Parish Church				55°27′40″N 4°21′53″W	Category B	14316	Upload another image See more images
Nos. 112 And 114 Main Street				55°27′35″N 4°22′06″W	Category C(S)	14319	Upload Photo
Ochiltree Mains				55°27′30″N 4°21′28″W	Category C(S)	14327	Upload Photo
Ochiltree Primary School Main Street, Ochiltree				55°27′37″N 4°21′58″W	Category C(S)	14344	Upload Photo
Nos. 64, 66, And 68 Main Street				55°27′39″N 4°21′56″W	Category C(S)	14347	Upload Photo
Nos. 56 And 58 Main Street				55°27′41″N 4°21′50″W	Category C(S)	18210	Upload Photo
No 5 Ayr Road				55°27′40″N 4°21′45″W	Category C(S)	14332	Upload Photo
Findlayston				55°27′18″N 4°22′15″W	Category C(S)	14326	Upload Photo
Cemetery				55°27′46″N 4°21′27″W	Category B	14330	Upload Photo
Market Cross				55°27′42″N 4°21′40″W	Category B	14331	Upload another image See more images
Nos 37 And 39 Main Street				55°27′40″N 4°21′51″W	Category C(S)	14338	Upload Photo
Nos 44 And 46 Main Street				55°27′42″N 4°21′49″W	Category C(S)	14341	Upload Photo
No 60 (Glencairn) Main Street				55°27′40″N 4°21′52″W	Category B	14346	Upload Photo
High Barbeth				55°26′40″N 4°27′42″W	Category C(S)	14348	Upload Photo
Manse				55°27′46″N 4°21′45″W	Category B	14329	Upload Photo
Blackbush Cottage (Off Ayre Road)				55°27′36″N 4°21′50″W	Category C(S)	14333	Upload Photo
Lugar Bridge				55°27′50″N 4°21′22″W	Category B	14322	Upload Photo
House Opposite Manse Gates, Manse Road. (J. Faulds)				55°27′44″N 4°21′45″W	Category C(S)	14321	Upload Photo
2/4 Manse Road, Ochiltree				55°27′43″N 4°21′41″W	Category C(S)	14324	Upload Photo
Old Burnock Bridge				55°27′39″N 4°21′36″W	Category C(S)	14337	Upload Photo
No 48 Main Street				55°27′42″N 4°21′49″W	Category C(S)	14345	Upload Photo

== Key ==
The scheme for classifying buildings in Scotland is:

- Category A: "buildings of national or international importance, either architectural or historic; or fine, little-altered examples of some particular period, style or building type."
- Category B: "buildings of regional or more than local importance; or major examples of some particular period, style or building type, which may have been altered."
- Category C: "buildings of local importance; lesser examples of any period, style, or building type, as originally constructed or moderately altered; and simple traditional buildings which group well with other listed buildings."

In March 2016 there were 47,288 listed buildings in Scotland. Of these, 8% were Category A, and 50% were Category B, with the remaining 42% being Category C.

== See also ==
- List of listed buildings in East Ayrshire
