= Kilmaurs Tolbooth =

Municipal building in Kilmaurs, Scotland

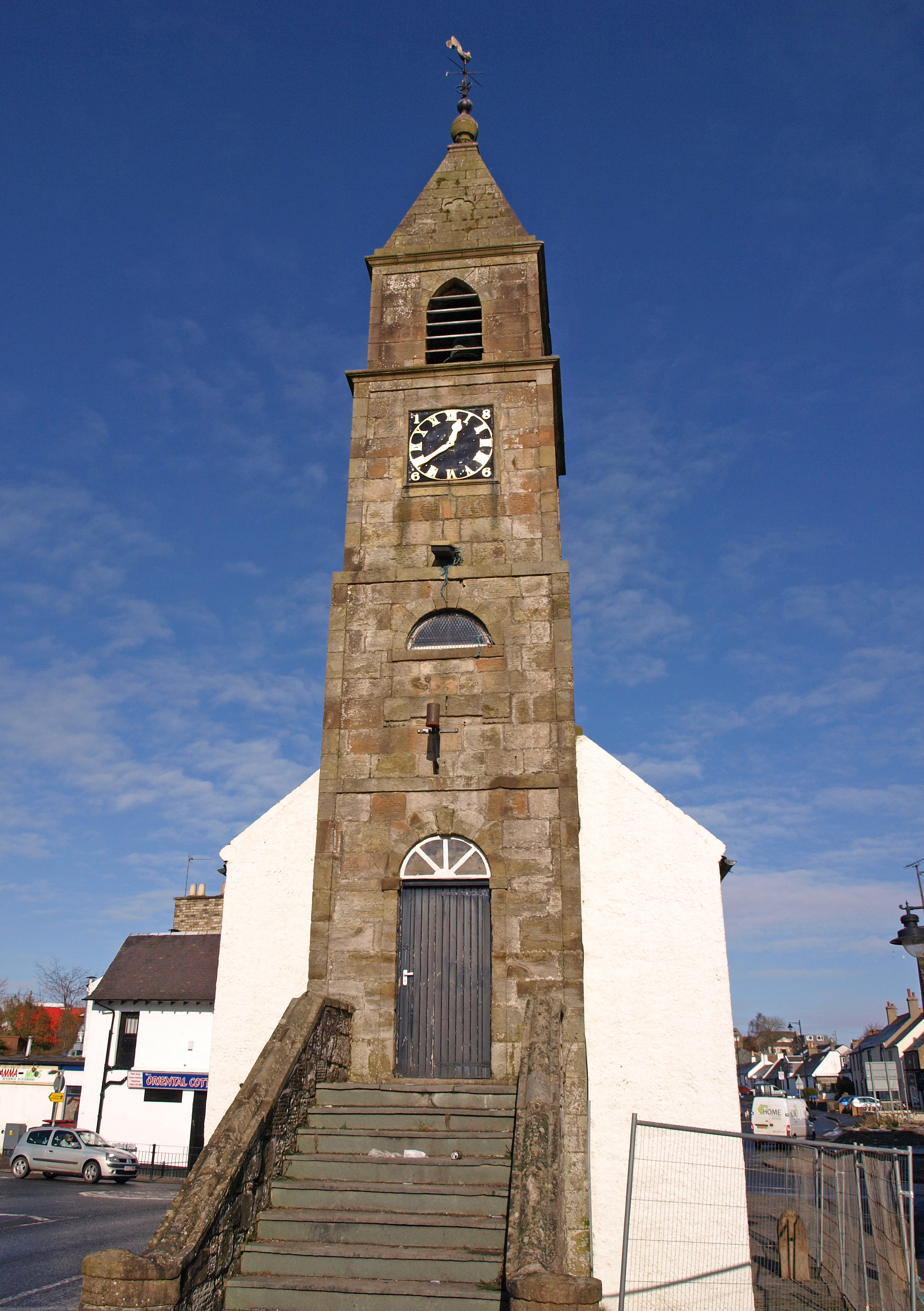
- The building in 2010

- Shown in East Ayrshire
- 55.6384°N 4.5270°W
- Location: Main Street, Kilmaurs

History
- Built: 1709

Site notes
- Architectural style: Scottish medieval style

Listed Building – Category A
- Official name: Tolbooth
- Designated: 14 April 1971
- Reference no.: LB12588

The Kilmaurs Tolbooth, also known as The Jougs, is a municipal building on Main Street in Kilmaurs in Scotland. The building, which is local landmark, is a Category A listed building.

== History ==
The original tolbooth was a single-storey building at the corner of Irvine Road and Main Street which may have dated back to the 16th century. The building, which is likely to have been used to hold prisoners, was no longer in use by the late 17th century.

The current building, on the east side of Main Street, was designed in the Scottish medieval style, built in painted stone and was completed in around 1709. The original design involved a rectangular main block facing onto Main Street with gables at either end. The building was repaired in 1743, and a four-stage tower was added in 1800. There was a short flight of steps leading up to a round headed doorway with a fanlight in the first stage, a Diocletian window in the second stage, blind walls in the third stage and a belfry with louvres in the fourth stage, all surmounted by pyramid-shaped roof and a weather vane in the form of a cockerel. Internally, the principal room was the council chamber on the first floor, which had a bench and a dock, and it once featured a fireplace. There were two prison cells on the ground floor.

After the jougs (a form of neck shackle) had been withdrawn from use in 1820, they were attached to the south wall of the building to act as a warning to others. A new mercat cross was erected to the north of the tolbooth in 1830. The council chamber was used as a meeting place by the ancient burgh council and, following the implementation of the Poor Law (Scotland) Act 1845, by the parish council, as well the venue for the magistrates' court. In February 1851, the magistrates, concerned that there were no police officers living in the immediate area, sought approval from the county prison board to put one of the old prison cells in proper order and to use it as a lock-up for petty prisoners. The other prison cell was used to accommodate the local horse-drawn fire engine.

A clock was added to the third stage of the tower in 1866 and, after the tower was hit by lightning, 12 feet (3.7 m) of masonry had to be replaced in 1874. An extensive programme of external restoration works, which included repairs to the cement render, was carried out by a local stonemason in 2018.

== See also ==
- List of Category A listed buildings in East Ayrshire
- List of listed buildings in Kilmaurs, East Ayrshire
