= List of listed buildings in Kilmaurs, East Ayrshire =

This is a list of listed buildings in the parish of Kilmaurs in East Ayrshire, Scotland.

== List ==
Name	Location	Date Listed	Grid Ref. (Note: Sometimes known as OSGB36, the grid reference (where provided) is based on the British national grid reference system used by the Ordnance Survey. • "Guide to National Grid". Ordnance Survey. • "Get-a-map". Ordnance Survey.)	Geo-coordinates	Notes	LB Number (Note: Historic Environment Scotland assign a unique alphanumeric identifier to each designated site in Scotland, for listed buildings this always begins with "LB", for example "LB12345".)	Image
Busbie, Crosshouse				55°36′52″N 4°33′05″W	Category B	12600	Upload Photo
20 And 20A Townend				55°38′14″N 4°31′36″W	Category C(S)	12558	Upload Photo
Nos. 8-18 (Even Numbers) Townend				55°38′14″N 4°31′36″W	Category C(S)	12591	Upload Photo
Nos. 59, 61 Main Street, Nos 1, 3 And 5 Townhead				55°38′23″N 4°31′34″W	Category C(S)	12592	Upload Photo
Craig				55°36′04″N 4°34′32″W	Category B	12551	Upload Photo
Parish Church And Graveyard				55°38′04″N 4°31′12″W	Category B	12577	Upload Photo
Dovecote, Tour Garden				55°38′01″N 4°31′17″W	Category A	12578	Upload another image See more images
Kilmaurs Bridge				55°38′12″N 4°31′29″W	Category C(S)	12583	Upload Photo
Kilmaurs Place				55°38′16″N 4°31′26″W	Category B	12584	Upload another image See more images
Foot Bridge Leading To Bowling Green				55°38′14″N 4°31′33″W	Category C(S)	12585	Upload Photo
Crosshouse Parish Church (Church Of Scotland) With Manse, War Memorial, Boundary Walls And Gates				55°36′46″N 4°33′01″W	Category C(S)	50112	Upload another image See more images
No 12 Irvine Vennel				55°38′19″N 4°31′46″W	Category C(S)	12594	Upload Photo
55 Main Street				55°38′22″N 4°31′34″W	Category C(S)	12596	Upload Photo
Disused Railway Viaduct Near West Gatehead				55°35′56″N 4°34′02″W	Category A	12556	Upload Photo
17 Town End				55°38′14″N 4°31′34″W	Category C(S)	12557	Upload Photo
Holland Green: Fenwick Road				55°38′21″N 4°31′24″W	Category B	12595	Upload Photo
2 Fenwick Road				55°38′19″N 4°31′34″W	Category C(S)	12597	Upload Photo
West Lodge, Thorntown				55°36′42″N 4°34′33″W	Category C(S)	12601	Upload Photo
Bridge, In Craig Policies				55°36′10″N 4°34′26″W	Category C(S)	12552	Upload Photo
The Barn				55°36′09″N 4°34′22″W	Category B	12554	Upload Photo
Tour				55°38′01″N 4°31′01″W	Category B	12579	Upload Photo
Mill Bridge				55°38′23″N 4°31′16″W	Category C(S)	12587	Upload Photo
Mercat Cross				55°38′18″N 4°31′37″W	Category B	12589	Upload Photo
Benridgeside				55°38′23″N 4°32′12″W	Category C(S)	13831	Upload Photo
Nos. 4, 6 And 8 Irvine Vennel				55°38′19″N 4°31′44″W	Category C(S)	12593	Upload Photo
Gardner's House (2 Dwellings)				55°36′09″N 4°34′22″W	Category B	12553	Upload Photo
Ice House				55°38′03″N 4°31′03″W	Category C(S)	12581	Upload Photo
North Lodge, Tour				55°38′04″N 4°31′07″W	Category C(S)	12582	Upload Photo
Lodge, Craig				55°36′11″N 4°34′28″W	Category C(S)	13825	Upload Photo
Turf Hotel				55°38′19″N 4°31′39″W	Category C(S)	13830	Upload Photo
25 Townend				55°38′13″N 4°31′32″W	Category C(S)	12561	Upload Photo
24 Townend				55°38′13″N 4°31′36″W	Category C(S)	12560	Upload Photo
Glencairn Church Fenwick Road				55°38′19″N 4°31′25″W	Category C(S)	12598	Upload another image
Kirkland				55°37′53″N 4°31′06″W	Category C(S)	12599	Upload Photo
Walled Kitchen Garden, Craig				55°36′07″N 4°34′15″W	Category B	12555	Upload Photo
22 Townend				55°38′13″N 4°31′36″W	Category C(S)	12559	Upload Photo
Bridge In Policies Of Tour				55°38′04″N 4°31′05″W	Category B	12580	Upload Photo
Tolbooth				55°38′18″N 4°31′37″W	Category A	12588	Upload another image See more images
Weston Tavern				55°38′18″N 4°31′36″W	Category B	12590	Upload another image

== Key ==
The scheme for classifying buildings in Scotland is:

- Category A: "buildings of national or international importance, either architectural or historic; or fine, little-altered examples of some particular period, style or building type."
- Category B: "buildings of regional or more than local importance; or major examples of some particular period, style or building type, which may have been altered."
- Category C: "buildings of local importance; lesser examples of any period, style, or building type, as originally constructed or moderately altered; and simple traditional buildings which group well with other listed buildings."

In March 2016 there were 47,288 listed buildings in Scotland. Of these, 8% were Category A, and 50% were Category B, with the remaining 42% being Category C.

== See also ==
- List of listed buildings in East Ayrshire
