= List of listed buildings in Old Cumnock, East Ayrshire =

This is a list of listed buildings in the parish of Old Cumnock in East Ayrshire, Scotland.

== List ==
Name	Location	Date Listed	Grid Ref. (Note: Sometimes known as OSGB36, the grid reference (where provided) is based on the British national grid reference system used by the Ordnance Survey. • "Guide to National Grid". Ordnance Survey. • "Get-a-map". Ordnance Survey.)	Geo-coordinates	Notes	LB Number (Note: Historic Environment Scotland assign a unique alphanumeric identifier to each designated site in Scotland, for listed buildings this always begins with "LB", for example "LB12345".)	Image
Dumfries House				55°27′20″N 4°18′29″W	Category A	14413	Upload another image See more images
Westgates, Dumfries House Policies				55°27′08″N 4°18′58″W	Category B	14421	Upload Photo
Dovecote Dumfries House				55°27′19″N 4°18′40″W	Category A	14416	Upload another image See more images
Lady's Bridge, Dumfries House Policies				55°27′20″N 4°18′10″W	Category C(S)	14417	Upload Photo
Waterloo Bridge, Dumfries House Policies				55°27′27″N 4°18′54″W	Category C(S)	14418	Upload Photo
Terringzean Castle, Dumfries House Policies				55°27′25″N 4°17′08″W	Category B	14423	Upload another image See more images
Coach Buildings, Dumfries House Policies				55°27′23″N 4°18′41″W	Category B	14420	Upload Photo
Stockiehill, Dumfries House Policies				55°27′15″N 4°17′50″W	Category B	14422	Upload Photo
Avenue Bridge, Dumfries House Policies				55°27′28″N 4°18′49″W	Category A	14414	Upload another image See more images
Sundial Dumfries House				55°27′22″N 4°18′30″W	Category B	14415	Upload another image See more images
Garallan				55°26′12″N 4°17′44″W	Category C(S)	14424	Upload Photo
Glaisnock House With Terrace Walls And Steps				55°26′04″N 4°15′14″W	Category B	44604	Upload another image
Icehouse, Dumfries House Policies				55°27′22″N 4°18′24″W	Category B	14419	Upload Photo

== Key ==
The scheme for classifying buildings in Scotland is:

- Category A: "buildings of national or international importance, either architectural or historic; or fine, little-altered examples of some particular period, style or building type."
- Category B: "buildings of regional or more than local importance; or major examples of some particular period, style or building type, which may have been altered."
- Category C: "buildings of local importance; lesser examples of any period, style, or building type, as originally constructed or moderately altered; and simple traditional buildings which group well with other listed buildings."

In March 2016 there were 47,288 listed buildings in Scotland. Of these, 8% were Category A, and 50% were Category B, with the remaining 42% being Category C.

== See also ==
- List of listed buildings in East Ayrshire
