= List of listed buildings in Dunlop, East Ayrshire =

This is a list of listed buildings in the parish of Dunlop in East Ayrshire, Scotland.

== List ==
Name	Location	Date Listed	Grid Ref. (Note: Sometimes known as OSGB36, the grid reference (where provided) is based on the British national grid reference system used by the Ordnance Survey. • "Guide to National Grid". Ordnance Survey. • "Get-a-map". Ordnance Survey.)	Geo-coordinates	Notes	LB Number (Note: Historic Environment Scotland assign a unique alphanumeric identifier to each designated site in Scotland, for listed buildings this always begins with "LB", for example "LB12345".)	Image
75 Main Street, Manse Cottage				55°42′42″N 4°32′23″W	Category C(S)	5198	Upload Photo
64 And 66 Main Street				55°42′43″N 4°32′19″W	Category C(S)	5199	Upload Photo
86, 88, And 90 Main Street With Boundary Walls, Gatepiers And Railings				55°42′43″N 4°32′23″W	Category C(S)	5200	Upload Photo
2 And 4 Lugton Road				55°42′46″N 4°31′59″W	Category C(S)	5202	Upload Photo
Mains Of Aiket With Flanking Byres, Ancillary Buildings, Treetops Cottage, Boundary Walls, Gates And Gatepiers				55°42′13″N 4°32′22″W	Category B	50088	Upload Photo
81 Main Street, Oran				55°42′43″N 4°32′20″W	Category C(S)	50097	Upload Photo
87 Main Street, Newfield				55°42′43″N 4°32′22″W	Category C(S)	50100	Upload Photo
91 Main Street				55°42′43″N 4°32′23″W	Category C(S)	50102	Upload Photo
95 Main Street				55°42′42″N 4°32′24″W	Category C(S)	50104	Upload Photo
Muirshiel With Ancillary Buildings				55°43′39″N 4°29′45″W	Category C(S)	5180	Upload Photo
2 Stewarton Road And 19 Main Street, The Village Inn				55°42′43″N 4°32′05″W	Category C(S)	5197	Upload Photo
92 Main Street, Kirkgate, With Boundary Wall				55°42′43″N 4°32′24″W	Category C(S)	5201	Upload Photo
Aiket Castle With Adjoining Cottage, Barmkin Wall, Aiket Mill, And Former Mill Lades				55°42′19″N 4°34′02″W	Category C(S)	50079	Upload another image See more images
Leahead With Byres, Boundary Walls, Gates And Gatepiers				55°42′09″N 4°34′32″W	Category C(S)	50081	Upload Photo
67 Main Street				55°42′43″N 4°32′14″W	Category C(S)	50083	Upload Photo
30 Main Street With Boundary Wall, Gates And Railings				55°42′45″N 4°32′06″W	Category C(S)	50087	Upload Photo
Low Borland With Byres, Former Threshing Barn And Other Ancillary Buildings				55°42′15″N 4°33′35″W	Category B	5185	Upload Photo
Main Street, Clandeboye School				55°42′42″N 4°32′26″W	Category A	5192	Upload Photo
Dunlop House, West Lodge With Boundary Walls, Gatepiers And Railings				55°42′48″N 4°30′53″W	Category C(S)	50080	Upload Photo
14 Lugton Road With Gatepiers And Boundary Wall				55°42′47″N 4°31′59″W	Category C(S)	50082	Upload Photo
83 Main Street				55°42′43″N 4°32′21″W	Category C(S)	50098	Upload Photo
78 And 80 Main Street				55°42′43″N 4°32′20″W	Category C(S)	50108	Upload Photo
84 Main Street				55°42′43″N 4°32′21″W	Category C(S)	50110	Upload Photo
Braehead With Former Threshing Barn, Boundary Wall, Gates And Gatepiers				55°42′19″N 4°34′18″W	Category C(S)	5189	Upload Photo
69 Main Street				55°42′43″N 4°32′15″W	Category C(S)	50084	Upload Photo
71 Main Street				55°42′43″N 4°32′16″W	Category C(S)	50085	Upload Photo
17 Newmill Road, Struthers, With Ancillary Buildings				55°42′48″N 4°31′47″W	Category C(S)	50089	Upload Photo
Pollick				55°45′40″N 4°30′06″W	Category C(S)	50091	Upload Photo
79 Main Street				55°42′43″N 4°32′20″W	Category C(S)	50096	Upload Photo
89 Main Street				55°42′43″N 4°32′22″W	Category C(S)	50101	Upload Photo
East Halket With Ancillary Buildings, Boundary Wall, Gates And Gatepiers				55°44′24″N 4°30′23″W	Category C(S)	5179	Upload Photo
Over Borland With Byres, Walled Garden, Boundary Wall And Gatepiers				55°42′36″N 4°32′57″W	Category C(S)	5186	Upload Photo
Main Street, Parish Church Graveyard, Hans Hamilton's Tomb				55°42′42″N 4°32′26″W	Category A	5191	Upload another image
73 Main Street, The Old Manse, With Former Stable And Coach House, Boundary Walls, Gates And Gatepiers				55°42′42″N 4°32′17″W	Category C(S)	5193	Upload Photo
62 Main Street, Kirkland With Former Coach House And Stables, Boundary Wall, Gates And Gatepiers				55°42′45″N 4°32′17″W	Category A	5194	Upload Photo
North Borland With Gates And Gatepiers And North Borland Cottage				55°42′47″N 4°32′55″W	Category C(S)	50090	Upload Photo
Stewarton Road, Viaduct				55°42′35″N 4°32′00″W	Category C(S)	50092	Upload Photo
Stewarton Road, Windyridge				55°42′29″N 4°31′57″W	Category C(S)	50093	Upload Photo
Craignaught With Flanking Byres And Former Threshing Barn				55°43′51″N 4°28′45″W	Category B	5181	Upload Photo
Dunlop House With Bridge				55°42′42″N 4°30′17″W	Category A	5187	Upload Photo
Bourock With Ancillary Buildings				55°43′44″N 4°32′08″W	Category C(S)	5204	Upload Photo
85 Main Street				55°42′43″N 4°32′21″W	Category C(S)	50099	Upload Photo
82 Main Street				55°42′43″N 4°32′21″W	Category C(S)	50109	Upload Photo
The Hill With Ancillary Buildings, Boundary Walls, Gates And Gatepiers				55°42′25″N 4°31′40″W	Category A	5184	Upload Photo
Loanhead Including Byres, Boundary Walls, Gates And Gatepiers				55°42′25″N 4°34′10″W	Category B	5188	Upload Photo
Main Street, Dunlop Parish Church (Church Of Scotland) With Boundary Walls, Gatepiers, And Graveyard				55°42′43″N 4°32′27″W	Category B	5190	Upload Photo
Main Street, Church Hall (Former Free Church) With Boundary Wall, Gates And Railings				55°42′45″N 4°32′12″W	Category C(S)	5195	Upload Photo
Straightbow Bridge				55°42′42″N 4°32′29″W	Category C(S)	50094	Upload Photo
93 Main Street, Edenville				55°42′43″N 4°32′23″W	Category C(S)	50103	Upload Photo
68 And 70 Main Street, The Auld Hoose				55°42′43″N 4°32′18″W	Category C(S)	50105	Upload Photo
72 And 74 Main Street				55°42′43″N 4°32′19″W	Category C(S)	50106	Upload Photo
76 Main Street, Cobble Cottage				55°42′43″N 4°32′20″W	Category C(S)	50107	Upload Photo
33 Main Street, The Old Schoolhouse, With Ancillary Buildings And Boundary Walls				55°42′43″N 4°32′08″W	Category C(S)	5196	Upload Photo
77 Main Street				55°42′43″N 4°32′19″W	Category C(S)	50095	Upload Photo

== Key ==
The scheme for classifying buildings in Scotland is:

- Category A: "buildings of national or international importance, either architectural or historic; or fine, little-altered examples of some particular period, style or building type."
- Category B: "buildings of regional or more than local importance; or major examples of some particular period, style or building type, which may have been altered."
- Category C: "buildings of local importance; lesser examples of any period, style, or building type, as originally constructed or moderately altered; and simple traditional buildings which group well with other listed buildings."

In March 2016 there were 47,288 listed buildings in Scotland. Of these, 8% were Category A, and 50% were Category B, with the remaining 42% being Category C.

== See also ==
- List of listed buildings in East Ayrshire
