= List of listed buildings in Auchinleck, East Ayrshire =

This is a list of listed buildings in the parish of Auchinleck in East Ayrshire, Scotland.

== List ==
Name	Location	Date listed	Geo-coordinates	Notes	Category	LB number	Image
Highhouse Industrial Estate Headframe And Steam Winding Engine In House			55°28′00″N 4°17′45″W		B	6580	Upload another image See more images
Auchinleck Estate, Wallace's Cave			55°28′50″N 4°22′39″W		B	6447	Upload another image See more images
Auchinleck Estate, Water Tower Or Dovecote			55°28′37″N 4°21′54″W		B	950	Upload another image See more images
The Iron Bridge, In Policies Of Auchinleck			55°28′45″N 4°21′38″W		B	952	Upload Photo
The "Ten Shilling Side" Bridge, In Policies Of Auchinleck			55°28′55″N 4°21′49″W		B	954	Upload another image
Kirkton Cottage			55°27′56″N 4°13′50″W		B	955	Upload Photo
South Lodge, Gates And Railings, Auchinleck House			55°28′13″N 4°21′13″W		C(S)	6597	Upload Photo
Auchinleck Estate, Coachhouse			55°28′37″N 4°21′52″W		B	6442	Upload Photo
Remains Of Old Church And Graveyard			55°27′58″N 4°17′35″W		B	947	Upload another image
Place Of Auchinleck			55°28′44″N 4°22′28″W		B	951	Upload Photo
Craigston Square Nos. 1-10			55°27′54″N 4°13′47″W		B	956	Upload Photo
Logan Bridge			55°27′35″N 4°14′17″W		B	965	Upload another image
Railway Viaduct, Rosebank			55°28′00″N 4°13′02″W		B	967	Upload Photo
Barony Colliery			55°28′03″N 4°19′51″W		B	971	Upload another image See more images
Auchinleck Estate, Burnsdale			55°28′39″N 4°21′27″W		B	6441	Upload Photo
Barony Church			55°27′58″N 4°17′33″W		C(S)	946	Upload another image
Auchinleck House			55°28′41″N 4°21′48″W		A	948	Upload another image See more images
Auchinleck Estate, Boswell's Summerhouse Or "D" Cave			55°28′47″N 4°21′39″W		B	6440	Upload Photo
Craigston House			55°27′53″N 4°13′53″W		B	957	Upload Photo
Institute			55°27′56″N 4°13′43″W		B	964	Upload Photo
Auchinleck Estate, Garden Cottage			55°28′41″N 4°22′25″W		C(S)	6443	Upload Photo
Bellow Mill			55°28′04″N 4°13′09″W		C(S)	966	Upload Photo
Dalblair Bridge			55°26′54″N 4°08′43″W		C(S)	969	Upload another image
Auchinleck Estate, Ha-Ha			55°28′42″N 4°21′59″W		B	6445	Upload Photo
Auchinleck, Stables			55°28′36″N 4°21′53″W		B	949	Upload another image
Glenmuir Bridge			55°27′25″N 4°11′42″W		B	968	Upload Photo
Auchinleck Estate, Ice Or Deer Cave			55°28′49″N 4°21′43″W		B	6446	Upload Photo
Auchinleck Estate, Sandstone Bridge			55°28′51″N 4°21′44″W		C(S)	6448	Upload another image
The High Bridge, In Policies Of Auchinleck			55°28′49″N 4°22′11″W		C(S)	953	Upload Photo
Auchinleck Estate, Gates			55°28′32″N 4°21′38″W		B	6444	Upload Photo
Covenanters' Monument, Airds Moss			55°30′30″N 4°09′04″W		B	970	Upload another image See more images
The Temple, In Policies Of Dumfries House			55°27′52″N 4°18′44″W		A	96	Upload another image See more images

== Key ==
The scheme for classifying buildings in Scotland is:

- Category A: "buildings of national or international importance, either architectural or historic; or fine, little-altered examples of some particular period, style or building type."
- Category B: "buildings of regional or more than local importance; or major examples of some particular period, style or building type, which may have been altered."
- Category C: "buildings of local importance; lesser examples of any period, style, or building type, as originally constructed or moderately altered; and simple traditional buildings which group well with other listed buildings."

In March 2016 there were 47,288 listed buildings in Scotland. Of these, 8% were Category A, and 50% were Category B, with the remaining 42% being Category C.

== See also ==
- List of listed buildings in East Ayrshire
