= List of listed buildings in Stewarton, East Ayrshire =

This is a list of listed buildings in the parish of Stewarton in East Ayrshire, Scotland.

== List ==
Name	Location	Date Listed	Grid Ref. (Note: Sometimes known as OSGB36, the grid reference (where provided) is based on the British national grid reference system used by the Ordnance Survey. • "Guide to National Grid". Ordnance Survey. • "Get-a-map". Ordnance Survey.)	Geo-coordinates	Notes	LB Number (Note: Historic Environment Scotland assign a unique alphanumeric identifier to each designated site in Scotland, for listed buildings this always begins with "LB", for example "LB12345".)	Image
Lainshaw House				55°40′29″N 4°31′47″W	Category B	41076	Upload another image See more images
41 Graham Terrace, Ashbank Including Gatepiers				55°41′03″N 4°31′02″W	Category C(S)	41082	Upload Photo
Robertland Bridge Over Annick Water				55°41′35″N 4°29′04″W	Category C(S)	19884	Upload Photo
21 Draffen Mount, Draffen House				55°40′37″N 4°30′22″W	Category C(S)	45920	Upload Photo
22 And 24 Lainshaw Street, Including The Royal Bank Of Scotland				55°40′47″N 4°30′57″W	Category C(S)	51375	Upload Photo
11-15 (Odd Nos) Main Street				55°40′49″N 4°30′54″W	Category C(S)	51377	Upload Photo
Annick Water Viaduct				55°40′38″N 4°31′10″W	Category B	41074	Upload another image See more images
Kilwinning Road, Dovecot At Deersland Farm				55°40′17″N 4°34′18″W	Category C(S)	18491	Upload Photo
Kilwinning Road, Kennox Cottage				55°40′12″N 4°34′12″W	Category C(S)	18493	Upload Photo
Old Glasgow Road, Fulshaw Farm				55°41′44″N 4°29′20″W	Category C(S)	18495	Upload Photo
2 Robertland, The Gatehouse, Including Gate Piers				55°41′39″N 4°29′28″W	Category C(S)	18499	Upload Photo
Old Kilmarnock Road, High Peacockbank House				55°40′13″N 4°30′43″W	Category C(S)	18500	Upload Photo
Auchentiber House, Including Outbuildings And Boundary Walls And Gatepiers				55°42′35″N 4°29′01″W	Category C(S)	51553	Upload Photo
15 Vennel Street, Woodlands, Including Gate Piers And Boundary Walls				55°40′46″N 4°30′48″W	Category C(S)	41069	Upload Photo
14 And 16 Kirkford				55°40′33″N 4°30′41″W	Category C(S)	41072	Upload Photo
2 And 7 David Dale Avenue, (Former East Gate To Lainshaw House)				55°40′35″N 4°31′38″W	Category C(S)	41077	Upload Photo
Lainshaw Stables				55°40′33″N 4°31′49″W	Category B	41078	Upload Photo
Girgenti Cottage				55°39′25″N 4°36′00″W	Category C(S)	18488	Upload Photo
Old Glasgow Road, High Williamshaw, Including Outbuilding				55°42′12″N 4°29′02″W	Category A	18496	Upload another image
Cutstraw Cottage				55°40′45″N 4°29′41″W	Category C(S)	18501	Upload Photo
8 Vennel Street				55°40′48″N 4°30′54″W	Category C(S)	49115	Upload Photo
Dalry Road, Cemetery House And Offices, Including Gates And Gatepiers				55°40′55″N 4°31′31″W	Category C(S)	51370	Upload Photo
3-7 (Odd Nos) Lainshaw Street				55°40′49″N 4°30′56″W	Category C(S)	51371	Upload Photo
1 Loudoun Street				55°40′35″N 4°30′39″W	Category C(S)	51376	Upload Photo
High Street, John Knox Parish Church, (Church Of Scotland)				55°40′51″N 4°30′50″W	Category B	41065	Upload another image
Girgenti Farm, Including Tower And Outbuildings				55°39′29″N 4°36′02″W	Category C(S)	18486	Upload another image See more images
Robertland, Including Outbuildings, Cottage And Walled Garden				55°41′30″N 4°28′54″W	Category B	18498	Upload Photo
Merryhill Farm And Ancillary Buildings				55°42′22″N 4°29′39″W	Category C(S)	18505	Upload Photo
8 Avenue Square, Former Burgh Offices				55°40′53″N 4°30′52″W	Category C(S)	41067	Upload Photo
High Street And Avenue Square, Including 2B High Street, Bank Of Scotland				55°40′51″N 4°30′52″W	Category C(S)	41068	Upload Photo
30 Vennel Street And 32 Vennel Street, Braehead House				55°40′45″N 4°30′51″W	Category B	41070	Upload Photo
Auchenharvie Castle				55°39′53″N 4°36′16″W	Category B	18485	Upload Photo
2-6 (Even Nos) Lainshaw Street & 2-6 (Even Nos) Vennel Street				55°40′48″N 4°30′55″W	Category C(S)	49114	Upload Photo
16-20 (Even Nos) Lainshaw Street, Including Outbuildings				55°40′48″N 4°30′56″W	Category C(S)	51552	Upload Photo
Avenue Square, Institute Hall				55°40′51″N 4°30′53″W	Category C(S)	41066	Upload Photo
16, 18 And 20 Standalane, Standalane House				55°38′45″N 4°31′45″W	Category C(S)	41075	Upload Photo
Kilwinning Road, Lainshaw Mains Farm				55°40′41″N 4°31′55″W	Category B	41079	Upload another image
Corsehill Castle				55°41′12″N 4°31′09″W	Category B	41080	Upload Photo
9-13 (Odd Nos) Lainshaw Street				55°40′49″N 4°30′57″W	Category C(S)	51372	Upload Photo
14 Lainshaw Street				55°40′48″N 4°30′56″W	Category C(S)	51374	Upload Photo
12 Kirkford				55°40′36″N 4°30′41″W	Category C(S)	41071	Upload Photo
13 Vennel Street, Kersland				55°40′47″N 4°30′50″W	Category B	41081	Upload Photo
Chapeltoun House				55°39′54″N 4°33′11″W	Category C(S)	51379	Upload another image See more images
13 Loudoun Street, Cragston House				55°40′32″N 4°30′26″W	Category C(S)	51389	Upload Photo
St Columba's Parish Church And Kirkyard, Including Boundary Walls, (Church Of Scotland)				55°40′44″N 4°30′58″W	Category B	41063	Upload another image
Little Cutstraw House				55°40′27″N 4°30′02″W	Category C(S)	19885	Upload Photo
Fairliecrevoch Farm, Including The Farmhouse, The Stone Barn, The Auld Dairy, The Old Byre And The Stable				55°38′52″N 4°35′34″W	Category C(S)	18489	Upload Photo
Kennox House, Including Gatepiers And Gates And Boundary Walls				55°40′16″N 4°34′12″W	Category A	18490	Upload Photo
15-19 (Odd Nos) Lainshaw Street				55°40′48″N 4°30′57″W	Category C(S)	51373	Upload Photo

== Key ==
The scheme for classifying buildings in Scotland is:

- Category A: "buildings of national or international importance, either architectural or historic; or fine, little-altered examples of some particular period, style or building type."
- Category B: "buildings of regional or more than local importance; or major examples of some particular period, style or building type, which may have been altered."
- Category C: "buildings of local importance; lesser examples of any period, style, or building type, as originally constructed or moderately altered; and simple traditional buildings which group well with other listed buildings."

In March 2016 there were 47,288 listed buildings in Scotland. Of these, 8% were Category A, and 50% were Category B, with the remaining 42% being Category C.

== See also ==
- List of listed buildings in East Ayrshire
