= List of listed buildings in Dalrymple, East Ayrshire =

This is a list of listed buildings in the parish of Dalrymple in East Ayrshire, Scotland.

== List ==
Name	Location	Date Listed	Grid Ref. (Note: Sometimes known as OSGB36, the grid reference (where provided) is based on the British national grid reference system used by the Ordnance Survey. • "Guide to National Grid". Ordnance Survey. • "Get-a-map". Ordnance Survey.)	Geo-coordinates	Notes	LB Number (Note: Historic Environment Scotland assign a unique alphanumeric identifier to each designated site in Scotland, for listed buildings this always begins with "LB", for example "LB12345".)	Image
Nos. 2-28 (Even Numbered) Garden Street				55°23′52″N 4°35′37″W	Category C(S)	6684	Upload Photo
7 Main Street				55°23′48″N 4°35′32″W	Category C(S)	1081	Upload Photo
Lodge, Gatepiers And Gates, Skeldon				55°23′48″N 4°34′53″W	Category B	1102	Upload Photo
Parish Church And Graveyard				55°23′46″N 4°35′42″W	Category B	1076	Upload Photo
Dalrymple Bridge				55°23′44″N 4°35′35″W	Category B	1077	Upload another image
17 Main Street				55°23′46″N 4°35′33″W	Category C(S)	1100	Upload Photo
Hollybush House				55°23′50″N 4°32′18″W	Category B	1104	Upload Photo
9, 11 Main Street				55°23′48″N 4°35′33″W	Category C(S)	1082	Upload Photo
The Old Castle And Remains Of Skeldon Castle				55°23′30″N 4°33′44″W	Category B	1103	Upload Photo
15 Main Street				55°23′47″N 4°35′33″W	Category C(S)	1099	Upload Photo
The Smithy				55°23′52″N 4°35′31″W	Category C(S)	1078	Upload Photo
Burnton Viaduct				55°24′16″N 4°34′15″W	Category B	1079	Upload another image See more images
13 Main Street				55°23′48″N 4°35′33″W	Category C(S)	1083	Upload Photo
Skeldon House				55°23′20″N 4°33′47″W	Category B	1101	Upload Photo
5 Main Street				55°23′49″N 4°35′32″W	Category C(S)	1080	Upload Photo

== Key ==
The scheme for classifying buildings in Scotland is:

- Category A: "buildings of national or international importance, either architectural or historic; or fine, little-altered examples of some particular period, style or building type."
- Category B: "buildings of regional or more than local importance; or major examples of some particular period, style or building type, which may have been altered."
- Category C: "buildings of local importance; lesser examples of any period, style, or building type, as originally constructed or moderately altered; and simple traditional buildings which group well with other listed buildings."

In March 2016 there were 47,288 listed buildings in Scotland. Of these, 8% were Category A, and 50% were Category B, with the remaining 42% being Category C.

== See also ==
- List of listed buildings in East Ayrshire
