= List of listed buildings in Muirkirk, East Ayrshire =

This is a list of listed buildings in the parish of Muirkirk in East Ayrshire, Scotland.

== List ==
Name	Location	Date Listed	Grid Ref. (Note: Sometimes known as OSGB36, the grid reference (where provided) is based on the British national grid reference system used by the Ordnance Survey. • "Guide to National Grid". Ordnance Survey. • "Get-a-map". Ordnance Survey.)	Geo-coordinates	Notes	LB Number (Note: Historic Environment Scotland assign a unique alphanumeric identifier to each designated site in Scotland, for listed buildings this always begins with "LB", for example "LB12345".)	Image
Greenockmains				55°31′16″N 4°10′07″W	Category B	14382	Upload Photo
Cairn, Near Springhill				55°30′28″N 4°04′08″W	Category B	19694	Upload Photo
Kerlstone House (Formerly Manse)				55°31′34″N 4°03′17″W	Category C(S)	14381	Upload Photo
Greenockmains Bridge				55°31′09″N 4°10′13″W	Category B	14383	Upload Photo
Cairn Near Townhead Of Greenock				55°31′01″N 4°08′54″W	Category B	14393	Upload Photo
Muirkirk, Former Kaimes Ironworks Institute, Including Gatepiers And Boundary Wall				55°30′51″N 4°04′01″W	Category B	47421	Upload Photo
Muirkirk Old Parish Kirk				55°31′34″N 4°03′37″W	Category B	14380	Upload Photo
Martyr's Grave, Upper Wellwood				55°30′21″N 4°06′12″W	Category C(S)	14394	Upload Photo
Garpel Bridge				55°31′07″N 4°10′43″W	Category C(S)	14384	Upload Photo
Covenanters' Monument, Priesthill				55°33′38″N 4°00′53″W	Category C(S)	14395	Upload Photo

== Key ==
The scheme for classifying buildings in Scotland is:

- Category A: "buildings of national or international importance, either architectural or historic; or fine, little-altered examples of some particular period, style or building type."
- Category B: "buildings of regional or more than local importance; or major examples of some particular period, style or building type, which may have been altered."
- Category C: "buildings of local importance; lesser examples of any period, style, or building type, as originally constructed or moderately altered; and simple traditional buildings which group well with other listed buildings."

In March 2016 there were 47,288 listed buildings in Scotland. Of these, 8% were Category A, and 50% were Category B, with the remaining 42% being Category C.

== See also ==
- List of listed buildings in East Ayrshire
