= List of listed buildings in Galston, East Ayrshire =

This is a list of listed buildings in the parish of Galston in East Ayrshire, Scotland.

== List ==
Name	Location	Date Listed	Grid Ref. (Note: Sometimes known as OSGB36, the grid reference (where provided) is based on the British national grid reference system used by the Ordnance Survey. • "Guide to National Grid". Ordnance Survey. • "Get-a-map". Ordnance Survey.)	Geo-coordinates	Notes	LB Number (Note: Historic Environment Scotland assign a unique alphanumeric identifier to each designated site in Scotland, for listed buildings this always begins with "LB", for example "LB12345".)	Image
R.C. Church Of St. Sophia				55°35′57″N 4°22′40″W	Category A	32010	Upload another image See more images
Barr Tower				55°35′54″N 4°22′47″W	Category B	32012	Upload Photo
Portland Arms Hotel				55°36′02″N 4°22′54″W	Category B	32014	Upload Photo
Nos. 4-24 (Even Numbers) Polworth Street				55°36′03″N 4°22′48″W	Category C(S)	32018	Upload Photo
Lodge, Lanfine (Opposite The Green)				55°36′20″N 4°19′13″W	Category B	13827	Upload Photo
Row Of Cottages, Priestland - (Pal Myra) (Roseside) (Lynedoch)				55°36′34″N 4°15′33″W	Category C(S)	12570	Upload Photo
34 Wallace Street With Boundary Wall And Gatepiers				55°35′57″N 4°22′46″W	Category B	48208	Upload Photo
Nos. 33 And 35 Bridge Street (Hugh H. Neil, Grocer)				55°36′01″N 4°22′48″W	Category C(S)	32017	Upload Photo
Greenbank				55°36′28″N 4°16′00″W	Category C(S)	12571	Upload Photo
Avon Bridge				55°36′01″N 4°11′42″W	Category B	12572	Upload Photo
Old Galston Church And Graveyard				55°36′03″N 4°22′56″W	Category B	32009	Upload another image
Parkeston Farm				55°35′54″N 4°19′06″W	Category C(S)	12569	Upload Photo
Allanton				55°36′33″N 4°13′22″W	Category C(S)	12573	Upload Photo
Glebe Road, Galston Primary School Main Block, Including Gates, Gatepiers, Railings And Boundary Walls				55°35′53″N 4°22′55″W	Category B	44603	Upload Photo
Nos. 14-28 (Even Numbers) Titchfield Street				55°36′05″N 4°23′01″W	Category C(S)	32019	Upload Photo
U.F. Church Wallace Street				55°35′56″N 4°22′49″W	Category B	32011	Upload Photo
Lanfine Estate, Walled Garden With Former Potting Sheds				55°36′05″N 4°17′35″W	Category C(S)	50120	Upload Photo
Galston Bridge				55°36′06″N 4°22′48″W	Category B	32013	Upload Photo
R.A. Hutchison & Co				55°36′02″N 4°22′53″W	Category B	32015	Upload Photo
Lanfine House				55°36′04″N 4°18′05″W	Category B	13826	Upload Photo
Dovecote, Lanfine Policies				55°36′03″N 4°18′09″W	Category B	12564	Upload Photo
Bridge, In Lanfine Park				55°36′03″N 4°17′51″W	Category B	12565	Upload Photo
Burnhead				55°35′52″N 4°13′01″W	Category C(S)	12574	Upload Photo
Glebe Road (East Side), Galston Primary School Infant Block, Including Gates, Gatepiers, Boundary Walls & Railings				55°35′54″N 4°22′52″W	Category C(S)	49189	Upload Photo
Co-Operative Society Building, 4-12 (Even Nos) Brewland Street				55°36′01″N 4°22′55″W	Category B	32020	Upload Photo
Nos. 4 & 6 Bridge Street				55°36′02″N 4°22′52″W	Category C(S)	32016	Upload Photo
Lodge, Lanfine (Opposite Townhead)				55°36′18″N 4°18′42″W	Category B	12567	Upload Photo
Bruntwood				55°33′54″N 4°22′21″W	Category B	12575	Upload Photo
Cairnhill Farm				55°34′42″N 4°20′15″W	Category C(S)	12576	Upload Photo
Holmes House Steading, Horse Engine House				55°35′55″N 4°25′07″W	Category C(S)	49579	Upload Photo
Bridge, Greenbank				55°36′30″N 4°15′42″W	Category C(S)	13828	Upload Photo
Cessnock Castle				55°35′26″N 4°21′53″W	Category A	12562	Upload Photo
Gateway, Causeyfoot				55°35′31″N 4°22′05″W	Category B	12563	Upload Photo
Lodge, Lanfine (Opposite Ranoldcoup Bridge)				55°36′20″N 4°16′54″W	Category B	12566	Upload Photo
Waterhaughs				55°36′20″N 4°17′32″W	Category B	12568	Upload Photo
Sornhill Farm				55°34′41″N 4°21′57″W	Category A	13829	Upload Photo

== Key ==
The scheme for classifying buildings in Scotland is:

- Category A: "buildings of national or international importance, either architectural or historic; or fine, little-altered examples of some particular period, style or building type."
- Category B: "buildings of regional or more than local importance; or major examples of some particular period, style or building type, which may have been altered."
- Category C: "buildings of local importance; lesser examples of any period, style, or building type, as originally constructed or moderately altered; and simple traditional buildings which group well with other listed buildings."

In March 2016 there were 47,288 listed buildings in Scotland. Of these, 8% were Category A, and 50% were Category B, with the remaining 42% being Category C.

== See also ==
- List of listed buildings in East Ayrshire
