= List of listed buildings in Riccarton, East Ayrshire =

This is a list of listed buildings in the parish of Riccarton in East Ayrshire, Scotland.

== List ==
Name	Location	Date Listed	Grid Ref. (Note: Sometimes known as OSGB36, the grid reference (where provided) is based on the British national grid reference system used by the Ordnance Survey. • "Guide to National Grid". Ordnance Survey. • "Get-a-map". Ordnance Survey.)	Geo-coordinates	Notes	LB Number (Note: Historic Environment Scotland assign a unique alphanumeric identifier to each designated site in Scotland, for listed buildings this always begins with "LB", for example "LB12345".)	Image
Caprington Mains				55°35′35″N 4°32′04″W	Category C(S)	50113	Upload Photo
Caprington Castle				55°35′38″N 4°31′42″W	Category A	18517	Upload another image See more images
Aird				55°34′07″N 4°25′57″W	Category B	18520	Upload Photo
Caprington Castle, Gardener's Cottage				55°35′29″N 4°31′31″W	Category B	18515	Upload another image
Shaw's Mill Bridge				55°34′11″N 4°26′01″W	Category C(S)	18521	Upload Photo
Walled Garden, Dallars				55°34′18″N 4°26′30″W	Category B	19886	Upload Photo
Stables, Dallars				55°34′20″N 4°26′17″W	Category B	18510	Upload Photo
Dovecote, Treesbank				55°34′43″N 4°30′31″W	Category A	18512	Upload Photo
Caprington Castle, Walled Garden				55°35′31″N 4°31′28″W	Category C(S)	18516	Upload another image
West Lodge, Caprington				55°35′30″N 4°31′56″W	Category B	18518	Upload Photo
Dallars House				55°34′22″N 4°26′16″W	Category B	18522	Upload Photo
Woodhead Farm				55°34′44″N 4°25′31″W	Category C(S)	18519	Upload Photo
Shawhill				55°36′28″N 4°26′49″W	Category B	19887	Upload another image
Stables, Caprington				55°35′35″N 4°31′49″W	Category B	19888	Upload Photo
Dallars Mains, Including Dovecote				55°34′19″N 4°26′37″W	Category B	18511	Upload Photo
Haining Mains				55°35′04″N 4°26′55″W	Category C(S)	18513	Upload Photo
Barleith				55°35′28″N 4°27′08″W	Category C(S)	18514	Upload Photo
Hurlford Primary School Including Boundary Walls, Gates And Railings				55°36′02″N 4°27′21″W	Category B	43522	Upload Photo

== Key ==
The scheme for classifying buildings in Scotland is:

- Category A: "buildings of national or international importance, either architectural or historic; or fine, little-altered examples of some particular period, style or building type."
- Category B: "buildings of regional or more than local importance; or major examples of some particular period, style or building type, which may have been altered."
- Category C: "buildings of local importance; lesser examples of any period, style, or building type, as originally constructed or moderately altered; and simple traditional buildings which group well with other listed buildings."

In March 2016 there were 47,288 listed buildings in Scotland. Of these, 8% were Category A, and 50% were Category B, with the remaining 42% being Category C.

== See also ==
- List of listed buildings in East Ayrshire
