= List of listed buildings in Stair, East Ayrshire =

This is a list of listed buildings in the parish of Stair in East Ayrshire, Scotland.

== List ==
Name	Location	Date Listed	Grid Ref. (Note: Sometimes known as OSGB36, the grid reference (where provided) is based on the British national grid reference system used by the Ordnance Survey. • "Guide to National Grid". Ordnance Survey. • "Get-a-map". Ordnance Survey.)	Geo-coordinates	Notes	LB Number (Note: Historic Environment Scotland assign a unique alphanumeric identifier to each designated site in Scotland, for listed buildings this always begins with "LB", for example "LB12345".)	Image
Stair Bridge				55°28′48″N 4°28′25″W	Category A	14371	Upload Photo
Stair House				55°28′59″N 4°28′13″W	Category A	14372	Upload Photo
Crosshill Cottages				55°29′12″N 4°24′34″W	Category C(S)	14378	Upload Photo
Schaw Church				55°27′13″N 4°27′28″W	Category C(S)	14376	Upload Photo
Barskimming New Bridge, Including Estate Workers' Houses And Viewing Platform				55°29′49″N 4°24′17″W	Category A	19483	Upload another image See more images
Old Bridge Of Coyle				55°27′26″N 4°29′35″W	Category C(S)	14373	Upload Photo
Trabbochburn				55°28′02″N 4°25′38″W	Category C(S)	14377	Upload Photo
Old Barskimming, Sundial				55°29′47″N 4°24′16″W	Category C(S)	19263	Upload Photo
Stair Inn, K6 Telephone Kiosk				55°28′48″N 4°28′17″W	Category B	19658	Upload Photo
Trabboch House				55°27′28″N 4°28′48″W	Category C(S)	19693	Upload Photo
Old Barskimming				55°29′46″N 4°24′15″W	Category B	19262	Upload Photo
Footbridge, Tam O'shanter And Water Of Ayr Hone Works				55°28′48″N 4°28′36″W	Category B	14359	Upload another image See more images
Parish Church				55°28′53″N 4°28′16″W	Category C(S)	14370	Upload Photo
Trabboch Castle				55°28′07″N 4°26′25″W	Category B	14374	Upload Photo
Stairhill				55°29′24″N 4°26′11″W	Category C(S)	14375	Upload Photo
Barskimming Old Bridge				55°29′57″N 4°23′29″W	Category B	14379	Upload Photo

== Key ==
The scheme for classifying buildings in Scotland is:

- Category A: "buildings of national or international importance, either architectural or historic; or fine, little-altered examples of some particular period, style or building type."
- Category B: "buildings of regional or more than local importance; or major examples of some particular period, style or building type, which may have been altered."
- Category C: "buildings of local importance; lesser examples of any period, style, or building type, as originally constructed or moderately altered; and simple traditional buildings which group well with other listed buildings."

In March 2016 there were 47,288 listed buildings in Scotland. Of these, 8% were Category A, and 50% were Category B, with the remaining 42% being Category C.

== See also ==
- List of listed buildings in East Ayrshire
