= List of listed buildings in Loudoun, East Ayrshire =

This is a list of listed buildings in the parish of Loudoun in East Ayrshire, Scotland.

== List ==
Name	Location	Date listed	Grid ref. (Note: Sometimes known as OSGB36, the grid reference (where provided) is based on the British national grid reference system used by the Ordnance Survey. • "Guide to National Grid". Ordnance Survey. • "Get-a-map". Ordnance Survey.)	Geo-coordinates	Notes	LB number (Note: Historic Environment Scotland assign a unique alphanumeric identifier to each designated site in Scotland, for listed buildings this always begins with "LB", for example "LB12345".)	Image
Passford Bridge				55°36′41″N 4°14′29″W	Category C(S)	12548	Upload Photo
Loudoun Castle				55°36′38″N 4°22′21″W	Category A	12536	Upload another image
East Glaister				55°37′03″N 4°14′39″W	Category B	12544	Upload Photo
Jocklan Bridge				55°36′52″N 4°21′11″W	Category C(S)	12541	Upload Photo
Underlaw				55°37′18″N 4°14′11″W	Category B	12546	Upload Photo
Newmilns, 123 Main Street, The Morton Hall With Boundary Wall				55°36′28″N 4°19′20″W	Category B	50036	Upload Photo
Dalwhatswood				55°36′52″N 4°19′02″W	Category B	12542	Upload Photo
Newmilns, 116 Loudoun Road				55°36′22″N 4°20′22″W	Category B	12550	Upload Photo
Mill Bridge, Ryeyard				55°36′40″N 4°13′47″W	Category C(S)	13824	Upload Photo
The Cottage, Loudoun Castle				55°36′41″N 4°22′26″W	Category B	12537	Upload Photo
Loudounhill				55°36′53″N 4°13′53″W	Category C(S)	12547	Upload Photo
Alexander Morton Monument, Beside A71 Between Newmilns And Darvel				55°36′33″N 4°18′00″W	Category A	13461	Upload Photo
Hendryton				55°37′10″N 4°15′28″W	Category C(S)	12543	Upload Photo
Broomhill				55°37′10″N 4°14′24″W	Category B	12545	Upload Photo
Lochfield Farm				55°38′50″N 4°15′14″W	Category C(S)	12549	Upload Photo
Loudoun Kirk And Graveyard				55°36′24″N 4°23′38″W	Category B	12535	Upload Photo
West Newton				55°37′26″N 4°21′37″W	Category B	12538	Upload Photo
Waterside				55°36′17″N 4°22′54″W	Category B	12540	Upload Photo
East Newton				55°37′17″N 4°21′20″W	Category B	12539	Upload Photo

== Key ==
The scheme for classifying buildings in Scotland is:

- Category A: "buildings of national or international importance, either architectural or historic; or fine, little-altered examples of some particular period, style or building type."
- Category B: "buildings of regional or more than local importance; or major examples of some particular period, style or building type, which may have been altered."
- Category C: "buildings of local importance; lesser examples of any period, style, or building type, as originally constructed or moderately altered; and simple traditional buildings which group well with other listed buildings."

In March 2016 there were 47,288 listed buildings in Scotland. Of these, 8% were Category A, and 50% were Category B, with the remaining 42% being Category C.

== See also ==
- List of listed buildings in East Ayrshire
