= List of listed buildings in Dalmellington, East Ayrshire =

This is a list of listed buildings in the parish of Dalmellington in East Ayrshire, Scotland.

== List ==
Name	Location	Date Listed	Grid Ref. (Note: Sometimes known as OSGB36, the grid reference (where provided) is based on the British national grid reference system used by the Ordnance Survey. • "Guide to National Grid". Ordnance Survey. • "Get-a-map". Ordnance Survey.)	Geo-coordinates	Notes	LB Number (Note: Historic Environment Scotland assign a unique alphanumeric identifier to each designated site in Scotland, for listed buildings this always begins with "LB", for example "LB12345".)	Image
Waterside, War Memorial				55°20′49″N 4°27′54″W	Category C(S)	6596	Upload Photo
Waterside Chapel Of Ease				55°20′54″N 4°28′05″W	Category C(S)	1093	Upload Photo
Nos. 4 And 5 Main Street				55°19′24″N 4°23′51″W	Category C(S)	1112	Upload Photo
Palace Bar, Waterside Village				55°20′48″N 4°28′00″W	Category B	6623	Upload Photo
Linn River Bridge				55°18′20″N 4°24′07″W	Category B	1088	Upload Photo
Patna Bridge Main Street, Patna				55°21′51″N 4°29′57″W	Category B	1090	Upload Photo
Laight Castle				55°20′57″N 4°26′46″W	Category C(S)	1091	Upload Photo
Waterside Engine House				55°20′41″N 4°27′32″W	Category A	1092	Upload Photo
Old Kirkyard				55°19′33″N 4°23′39″W	Category B	1106	Upload Photo
Doon Tavern				55°19′23″N 4°23′48″W	Category B	1111	Upload Photo
Sillyhole Bridge				55°19′42″N 4°24′19″W	Category C(S)	1084	Upload Photo
8-11 (Consecutive Nos) Cathcartson Dalmellington				55°19′21″N 4°23′51″W	Category C(S)	1085	Upload Photo
Dalmellington Inn				55°19′24″N 4°23′48″W	Category C(S)	4900	Upload Photo
Lodge At Entrance To Craigengillan				55°19′26″N 4°24′22″W	Category B	1086	Upload Photo
Bridge, Adjacent To Lodge				55°19′25″N 4°24′23″W	Category B	1087	Upload Photo
Cathcart Hall				55°19′27″N 4°23′47″W	Category B	1107	Upload Photo
Waterside, Ardoon House				55°20′50″N 4°27′40″W	Category B	1094	Upload Photo
Church Hill No 17 Dalmellington				55°19′27″N 4°23′44″W	Category C(S)	1110	Upload Photo
Buchan's Bridge				55°19′35″N 4°24′34″W	Category C(S)	122	Upload Photo
16 Ayr Road (Former Schoolhouse To Dalmellington Primary School)				55°19′26″N 4°24′10″W	Category C(S)	48145	Upload Photo
Dalcairnie Bridge, Craigengillan Estate				55°18′28″N 4°25′07″W	Category C(S)	49506	Upload Photo
Nos 30, 32 High Street				55°19′23″N 4°23′44″W	Category C(S)	1109	Upload Photo
Doon Bridge On Straiton Road				55°19′26″N 4°25′33″W	Category B	1113	Upload Photo
Galloway Hydro Electric Power Scheme, Loch Doon Dam				55°17′00″N 4°23′57″W	Category C(S)	51711	Upload Photo
Waterside, Waterside Institute				55°20′48″N 4°27′52″W	Category B	6595	Upload Photo
Kirk Of The Covenant				55°19′31″N 4°23′47″W	Category B	1105	Upload Photo

== Key ==
The scheme for classifying buildings in Scotland is:

- Category A: "buildings of national or international importance, either architectural or historic; or fine, little-altered examples of some particular period, style or building type."
- Category B: "buildings of regional or more than local importance; or major examples of some particular period, style or building type, which may have been altered."
- Category C: "buildings of local importance; lesser examples of any period, style, or building type, as originally constructed or moderately altered; and simple traditional buildings which group well with other listed buildings."

In March 2016 there were 47,288 listed buildings in Scotland. Of these, 8% were Category A, and 50% were Category B, with the remaining 42% being Category C.

== See also ==
- List of listed buildings in East Ayrshire
