= List of listed buildings in Newmilns And Greenholm, East Ayrshire =

This is a list of listed buildings in the parish of Newmilns And Greenholm in East Ayrshire, Scotland.

== List ==
Name	Location	Date Listed	Grid Ref. (Note: Sometimes known as OSGB36, the grid reference (where provided) is based on the British national grid reference system used by the Ordnance Survey. • "Guide to National Grid". Ordnance Survey. • "Get-a-map". Ordnance Survey.)	Geo-coordinates	Notes	LB Number (Note: Historic Environment Scotland assign a unique alphanumeric identifier to each designated site in Scotland, for listed buildings this always begins with "LB", for example "LB12345".)	Image
Clydesdale And North Of Scotland Bank Ltd., Main Street				55°36′27″N 4°19′28″W	Category B	38610	Upload Photo
Royal Bank Of Scotland, 1 Brown's Road And Lamlash House 1 Brown Street				55°36′24″N 4°19′36″W	Category B	38619	Upload Photo
Covenanter's Hotel,111-123 Main Street And King Street				55°36′28″N 4°19′21″W	Category C(S)	38617	Upload Photo
Newmilns Tower To Rear Of Loudoun Arms, Castle Street				55°36′28″N 4°19′30″W	Category B	38606	Upload another image
32, 34 And 36 Main Street				55°36′26″N 4°19′33″W	Category C(S)	46291	Upload Photo
Nos 52, 54, 56, 58, 60, 62, 64 And 66 Main Street				55°36′26″N 4°19′30″W	Category B	38608	Upload Photo
30 High Street				55°36′29″N 4°19′28″W	Category B	46290	Upload Photo
93-95 (Odd Numbers) Main Street				55°36′28″N 4°19′25″W	Category C(S)	38611	Upload Photo
Old Council House, Main Street				55°36′26″N 4°19′31″W	Category B	38607	Upload Photo
41, 43 And 45 Main Street				55°36′27″N 4°19′33″W	Category C(S)	46292	Upload Photo
Newmilns, 72 Main Street, Brown's Institute With Courtyard Wall And Gatepiers				55°36′27″N 4°19′28″W	Category C(S)	44725	Upload Photo
Lady Flora's School, Main Street				55°36′29″N 4°19′18″W	Category B	38612	Upload another image See more images
Railway Viaduct				55°36′26″N 4°19′13″W	Category B	38615	Upload another image
26-28 (Even Nos) High Street				55°36′29″N 4°19′28″W	Category C(S)	46289	Upload Photo
Westgate Co-Operative Society Building, 25-35 (Odd Nos) Main Street And Kilnholm Street				55°36′27″N 4°19′34″W	Category B	38618	Upload Photo
Loudoun Old Parish Church, Main Street, And Graveyard				55°36′27″N 4°19′23″W	Category B	38605	Upload Photo
Flour Mill, Ladeside Bottom Of Union St				55°36′22″N 4°18′56″W	Category B	38614	Upload Photo
Craigview Bridge				55°36′25″N 4°19′26″W	Category B	38616	Upload Photo
73-77 (Odd Nos) Main Street, Newmilns				55°36′27″N 4°19′28″W	Category B	43478	Upload Photo
Loudoun Arms				55°36′27″N 4°19′29″W	Category B	38609	Upload Photo
Townhead Farm				55°36′24″N 4°18′55″W	Category B	38613	Upload Photo

== Key ==
The scheme for classifying buildings in Scotland is:

- Category A: "buildings of national or international importance, either architectural or historic; or fine, little-altered examples of some particular period, style or building type."
- Category B: "buildings of regional or more than local importance; or major examples of some particular period, style or building type, which may have been altered."
- Category C: "buildings of local importance; lesser examples of any period, style, or building type, as originally constructed or moderately altered; and simple traditional buildings which group well with other listed buildings."

In March 2016 there were 47,288 listed buildings in Scotland. Of these, 8% were Category A, and 50% were Category B, with the remaining 42% being Category C.

== See also ==
- List of listed buildings in East Ayrshire
