= List of listed buildings in Sorn, East Ayrshire =

This is a list of listed buildings in the parish of Sorn in East Ayrshire, Scotland.

== List ==
Name	Location	Date Listed	Grid Ref. (Note: Sometimes known as OSGB36, the grid reference (where provided) is based on the British national grid reference system used by the Ordnance Survey. • "Guide to National Grid". Ordnance Survey. • "Get-a-map". Ordnance Survey.)	Geo-coordinates	Notes	LB Number (Note: Historic Environment Scotland assign a unique alphanumeric identifier to each designated site in Scotland, for listed buildings this always begins with "LB", for example "LB12345".)	Image
Sorn Castle, Turbine House				55°30′48″N 4°18′07″W	Category C(S)	44574	Upload Photo
2-10 (Even Nos) Ballochmyle Street, Catrine				55°30′19″N 4°20′06″W	Category C(S)	43501	Upload Photo
1-13 (Odd Nos) Ford Street, Catrine				55°30′15″N 4°19′49″W	Category C(S)	43505	Upload Photo
16-26 (Even Nos) Mill Square, Catrine				55°30′15″N 4°19′57″W	Category C(S)	43508	Upload Photo
28-32 (Even Nos) Mill Square, Catrine				55°30′14″N 4°19′54″W	Category C(S)	43509	Upload Photo
10-14 (Even Nos) St Germain Street, Catrine				55°30′15″N 4°19′51″W	Category C(S)	43516	Upload Photo
Catrine 2 Institute Avenue Library And Community Centre				55°30′10″N 4°19′55″W	Category C(S)	14268	Upload Photo
Auchmannoch				55°32′57″N 4°18′44″W	Category B	14269	Upload Photo
Daldorch				55°30′26″N 4°19′02″W	Category B	19680	Upload Photo
Dalgain Mill				55°30′47″N 4°17′54″W	Category C(S)	14258	Upload Photo
Sorn Castle				55°30′52″N 4°18′04″W	Category A	14273	Upload Photo
Catrine, St Cuthbert's Street, Footbridge Over The River Ayr				55°30′22″N 4°19′10″W	Category C(S)	50121	Upload Photo
Ballochmyle Street, Catrine, Ayr Bank House With Railings And Boundary Wall				55°30′18″N 4°20′08″W	Category B	43499	Upload Photo
10-14 (Even Nos) Mill Square, Catrine				55°30′15″N 4°19′58″W	Category C(S)	43507	Upload Photo
34-38 (Even Nos) Mill Square, Catrine				55°30′14″N 4°19′54″W	Category C(S)	43510	Upload Photo
St Germain Street And Mill Square, Catrine, The Royal				55°30′15″N 4°19′52″W	Category C(S)	43513	Upload Photo
22-34 (Even Nos)St Germain Street, Including The Brewery Bar, Catrine				55°30′14″N 4°19′47″W	Category C(S)	43518	Upload Photo
1 Ballochmyle Street, Catrine				55°30′18″N 4°20′07″W	Category C(S)	43500	Upload Photo
42-46 (Even Nos) Mill Square, Catrine				55°30′14″N 4°19′53″W	Category C(S)	43511	Upload Photo
Dalgain				55°30′35″N 4°16′55″W	Category C(S)	14261	Upload Photo
Glenlogan				55°30′27″N 4°16′09″W	Category B	14262	Upload Photo
Catrine Parish Church				55°30′20″N 4°19′58″W	Category A	14264	Upload another image
2 Bridge Street, Catrine				55°30′14″N 4°19′56″W	Category C(S)	43502	Upload Photo
Mill Square And 3-5 Bridge Street, Catrine, Volunteer Arms				55°30′14″N 4°19′55″W	Category C(S)	43506	Upload Photo
8 St Germain Street, Catrine				55°30′15″N 4°19′52″W	Category C(S)	43515	Upload Photo
Sorn, Entrance Lodge And Gateway				55°30′59″N 4°18′18″W	Category B	14256	Upload another image
Sorn New Bridge				55°30′36″N 4°17′17″W	Category B	14259	Upload another image
Parish Church And Graveyard, Sorn				55°30′47″N 4°17′51″W	Category B	14271	Upload Photo
Stables, Sorn Castle				55°30′55″N 4°18′18″W	Category A	14274	Upload Photo
Sorn Kirkside Place Formerly The Manse				55°30′46″N 4°17′47″W	Category C(S)	14275	Upload Photo
4 And 8 Bridge Street, Catrine				55°30′15″N 4°19′51″W	Category C(S)	43503	Upload Photo
20-24 Mill Street, Catrine, The Old Mill Inn				55°30′18″N 4°20′02″W	Category C(S)	43512	Upload Photo
16-20 (Even Nos) St Germain Street, Catrine				55°30′15″N 4°19′50″W	Category C(S)	43517	Upload Photo
Burnside Cottage				55°31′08″N 4°19′31″W	Category B	14266	Upload Photo
Gilmilnscroft				55°30′07″N 4°16′55″W	Category B	14270	Upload Photo
Catrine Village, St. Germain Street Nether Catrine House				55°30′13″N 4°19′41″W	Category B	14276	Upload Photo
40 Mill Square				55°30′14″N 4°19′53″W	Category C(S)	51098	Upload Photo
11-12 Bridge Street, Catrine				55°30′13″N 4°19′55″W	Category C(S)	43504	Upload Photo
Sorn Castle, East Gatehouse, Cleuch Cottage				55°30′53″N 4°17′57″W	Category B	19666	Upload Photo
No. 1 Ladeside Cottage				55°30′47″N 4°17′54″W	Category C(S)	14257	Upload Photo
Bridge Over River Ayr, Opposite Sorn Parish Church				55°30′46″N 4°17′54″W	Category A	14272	Upload another image
St Germain Street, Catrine, The Royal Bank Of Scotland With Boundary Walls				55°30′16″N 4°19′52″W	Category C(S)	43514	Upload Photo
Sawmill Cottage And Gatepiers				55°30′57″N 4°18′34″W	Category C(S)	19681	Upload Photo
Nethershield Farmhouse And Steading				55°30′53″N 4°14′34″W	Category B	19258	Upload Photo
School, Sorn				55°30′38″N 4°17′31″W	Category B	14260	Upload Photo
Stables, Daldorch				55°30′23″N 4°19′07″W	Category B	14263	Upload Photo

== Key ==
The scheme for classifying buildings in Scotland is:

- Category A: "buildings of national or international importance, either architectural or historic; or fine, little-altered examples of some particular period, style or building type."
- Category B: "buildings of regional or more than local importance; or major examples of some particular period, style or building type, which may have been altered."
- Category C: "buildings of local importance; lesser examples of any period, style, or building type, as originally constructed or moderately altered; and simple traditional buildings which group well with other listed buildings."

In March 2016 there were 47,288 listed buildings in Scotland. Of these, 8% were Category A, and 50% were Category B, with the remaining 42% being Category C.

== See also ==
- List of listed buildings in East Ayrshire
