= List of Category A listed buildings in East Ayrshire =

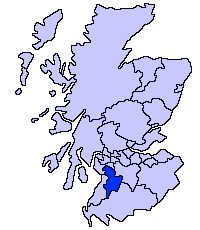
East Ayrshire shown within Scotland

This is a list of Category A listed buildings in East Ayrshire, Scotland.

In Scotland, the term listed building refers to a building or other structure officially designated as being of "special architectural or historic interest". Category A structures are those considered to be "buildings of national or international importance, either architectural or historic, or fine little-altered examples of some particular period, style or building type." Listing was begun by a provision in the Town and Country Planning (Scotland) Act 1947, and the current legislative basis for listing is the Planning (Listed Buildings and Conservation Areas) (Scotland) Act 1997. The authority for listing rests with Historic Scotland, an executive agency of the Scottish Government, which inherited this role from the Scottish Development Department in 1991. Once listed, severe restrictions are imposed on the modifications allowed to a building's structure or its fittings. Listed building consent must be obtained from local authorities prior to any alteration to such a structure. There are approximately 47,400 listed buildings in Scotland, of which around 8% (some 3,800) are Category A.

The council area of East Ayrshire covers 1,262 square kilometres (487 sq mi), and has a population of around 119,900. There are 45 Category A listed buildings in the area.

== Listed buildings ==
Name	Location	Date listed	Geo-coordinates	Notes	LB number	Image
Dumfries House, The Temple	Dumfries House estate, near Cumnock		55°27′52″N 4°18′44″W	Pair of restored lodges forming part of the Dumfries House estate	96	Upload another image See more images
Auchinleck House	Auchinleck		55°28′41″N 4°21′48″W	House of c. 1760, by Robert Adam	948	Upload another image See more images
Waterside Engine House	Waterside Ironworks, Dalmellington		55°20′41″N 4°27′32″W	Mid 19th-century industrial building	1092	Upload Photo
Loanhead School	Loanhead Street, Kilmarnock	1 August 2002	55°36′25″N 4°29′29″W	3-storey classical school	48755	Upload another image
The Hill	Dunlop		55°42′25″N 4°31′40″W	Mid 18th-century farmhouse	5184	Upload another image
Dunlop House	Dunlop		55°42′42″N 4°30′17″W	Baronial house of 1834 by David Hamilton	5187	Upload another image See more images
Clandeboye Vault	Dunlop Parish Church Graveyard, Dunlop		55°42′42″N 4°32′26″W	1641 tomb of Hans Hamilton, first Protestant minister of Dunlop	5191	Upload another image
Clandeboye Schoolhouse	Main Street, Dunlop		55°42′42″N 4°32′26″W	School founded in 1641 by Viscount Clandeboye, one of the oldest surviving school buildings in Scotland	5192	Upload another image
Kirkland	Main Street, Dunlop		55°42′45″N 4°32′17″W	Early-16th-century former manse, one of the oldest unfortified houses to survive in Scotland	5194	Upload another image See more images
Rowallan Castle	Kilmaurs		55°39′00″N 4°29′21″W	16th- to 17th-century Baronial mansion	12523	Upload another image See more images
Rowallan House	Kilmaurs		55°39′10″N 4°29′33″W	Country house by Robert Lorimer, completed 1906	12524	Upload another image
Craufurdland Castle	Near Kilmarnock		55°38′10″N 4°27′17″W	19th-century Gothic house incorporating 17th-century and earlier buildings	12530	Upload another image See more images
Loudoun Castle	Galston		55°36′38″N 4°22′21″W	1807 country house by Archibald Elliot, now in ruins	12536	Upload another image See more images
Laigh Milton Viaduct	Over the River Irvine at Gatehead		55°35′56″N 4°34′02″W	The earliest surviving railway bridge in Scotland, opened in 1812	12556	Upload another image See more images
Cessnock Castle	Galston		55°35′26″N 4°21′53″W	Late-19th-century mansion, incorporating an earlier tower house	12562	Upload Photo
Tour Dovecot	Kilmaurs		55°38′01″N 4°31′17″W	Dovecote dated 1636	12578	Upload another image See more images
Kilmaurs Tolbooth	Kilmaurs		55°38′18″N 4°31′37″W	Former parish council chambers and jail	12588	Upload another image See more images
Alexander Morton Monument	Beside A71 between Newmilns and Darvel		55°36′33″N 4°18′00″W	Monument by Robert Lorimer, completed 1927	13461	Upload Photo
Sornhill Farm	Galston		55°34′41″N 4°21′57″W	17th- to 18th-century farmhouse	13829	Upload Photo
Catrine Parish Church	Catrine		55°30′20″N 4°19′58″W	Late-18th-century chapel of ease	14264	Upload another image See more images
Sorn Old Bridge	Over River Ayr at Sorn		55°30′46″N 4°17′54″W	Hump-backed stone bridge	14272	Upload another image
Sorn Castle	Sorn		55°30′52″N 4°18′04″W	16th-century tower house with 18th- and 19th-century additions	14273	Upload another image See more images
Sorn Castle Stables	Sorn		55°30′55″N 4°18′18″W	Early-19th- or late-18th-century classical courtyard	14274	Upload Photo
Stair Bridge	Over the River Ayr at Stair		55°28′48″N 4°28′25″W	Three-arch bridge built 1745	14371	Upload another image See more images
Stair House	Stair		55°28′59″N 4°28′13″W	17th-century country house	14372	Upload another image See more images
Dumfries House	Cumnock		55°27′20″N 4°18′29″W	Country house built 1759 to designs by John, Robert and James Adam	14413	Upload another image See more images
Dumfries House, Avenue Bridge	Over the River Lugar in Dumfries House estate, Cumnock		55°27′28″N 4°18′49″W	Three-arch bridge contemporary with the house	14414	Upload another image See more images
Dumfries House Dovecote	Dumfries House estate, Cumnock		55°27′19″N 4°18′40″W	17th-century dovecote	14416	Upload another image See more images
Mauchline Castle (Abbot Hunter's Tower)	Mauchline		55°30′57″N 4°22′51″W	Former grange of Melrose Abbey, c. 1450	14471	Upload another image See more images
Ballochmyle Viaduct	Over the River Ayr near Mauchline		55°29′58″N 4°21′44″W	Railway viaduct opened in 1850	14483	Upload another image See more images
Kennox House	West of Stewarton		55°40′16″N 4°34′12″W	Mid-18th-century house with substantial early-19th-century additions	18490	Upload another image See more images
High Williamshaw	North-east of Stewarton		55°42′12″N 4°29′02″W	Late-18th-century gentleman's house	18496	Upload another image
Treesbanks House Dovecot	Ayr Road, Kilmarnock		55°34′43″N 4°30′31″W	Dovecote of 1771	18512	Upload Photo
Caprington Castle	West of Kilmarnock		55°35′38″N 4°31′42″W	Gothic mansion of c. 1820, incorporating and earlier building	18517	Upload another image See more images
Craigengillan	South of Dalmellington		55°17′45″N 4°24′21″W	18th-century house, enlarged in the Gothic style in the 19th century	18793	Upload another image
Craigengillan Stable Block	Craigengillan, south of Dalmellington		55°17′43″N 4°24′20″W	Late-18th-century classical stable court	18794	Upload another image
Loch Doon Castle	Loch Doon		55°13′26″N 4°22′42″W	Remains of an eleven-sided curtain-wall castle	18795	Upload another image See more images
Barskimming New Bridge	Over River Ayr at Barskimming, Mauchline		55°29′49″N 4°24′16″W	Later 18th-century bridge, with adjacent estate workers' houses and a viewing platform	19483	Upload another image See more images
Cumnock Mercat Cross	The Square, Cumnock		55°27′14″N 4°15′58″W	Mercat cross dating to 1703	24093	Upload another image See more images
Bank (or Templand) Railway Viaduct	Over Lugar Water in Woodroad Park, Cumnock		55°27′31″N 4°15′24″W	13-arch viaduct completed 1850	24133	Upload another image See more images
St Sophia's Roman Catholic Church	Bentinck Street, Galston		55°35′57″N 4°22′40″W	Byzantine-style church of 1886 by Robert Weir Schultz	32010	Upload another image See more images
Laigh Kirk	Bank Street, Kilmarnock		55°36′35″N 4°29′52″W	Early-19th-century church with 17th-century tower	35875	Upload another image See more images
Dean Castle	Dean Road, Kilmarnock		55°37′23″N 4°29′02″W	Late-14th- or early-15th-century tower house with later additions, restored in the 20th century	35884	Upload another image See more images
Palace Theatre, former Corn Exchange	Green Street, Kilmarnock		55°36′35″N 4°29′40″W	Italianate corn exchange built 1863 by James Ingram, converted in the 20th century	35903	Upload another image See more images
Holy Trinity Episcopal Church	Dundonald Road, Kilmarnock		55°36′27″N 4°30′02″W	Mid 19th-century church, extended in 1876 by George Gilbert Scott	35946	Upload another image See more images
Old High Kirk, including kirkyard with Soulis Monument	Soulis Street, Kilmarnock		55°36′45″N 4°29′41″W	Church of 1740, to designs taken from a James Gibbs pattern book	35965	Upload another image See more images

== See also ==
- Scheduled monuments in East Ayrshire
