= Scheduled monuments in East Ayrshire =

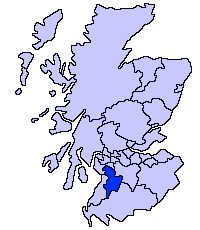
East Ayrshire shown within Scotland

A scheduled monument in Scotland is a nationally important archaeological site or monument which is given legal protection by being placed on a list (or "schedule") maintained by Historic Environment Scotland. The aim of scheduling is to preserve the country's most significant sites and monuments as far as possible in the form in which they have been inherited.

The process of scheduling is governed by the Ancient Monuments and Archaeological Areas Act 1979, which aims "to make provision for the investigation, preservation and recording of matters of archaeological or historical interest". The term "scheduled monument" can apply to the whole range of archaeological sites which have been deliberately constructed by human activity but are not always visible above ground. They range from prehistoric standing stones and burial sites, through Roman remains and medieval structures such as castles and monasteries, to later structures such as industrial sites and buildings constructed for the World Wars. Some buildings or structures which were both scheduled and listed have had their listing designations removed to reduce the duplication.

In 2017 there were 8238 scheduled monuments in Scotland.

== Notable Scheduled Monuments in East Ayrshire ==
Name	Location	Description	Ref No	Image
Dalmellington (Waterside) Ironworks	Dalmellington	Remains of iron works	SM4345	
Ballochmyle rock carvings	Mauchline	Prehistoric rock art	SM4484	
Auchinleck Castle	Auchinleck	Remains of Auchinleck Castle	SM5269	
Trabboch Castle	Stair	Remains of 14th-century strong tower	SM5281	
Loch Doon Castle (Original site and remains)	Castle Island, Loch Doon, Dalmellington	Subterranean remains of original medieval castle	SM8619	
Loch Doon Castle (Relocated)	Loch Doon, Dalmellington	Relocated remains of medieval castle	SM90203	

== See also ==
- List of Category A listed buildings in East Ayrshire
