= Dalmore House and Estate =

Dalmore House
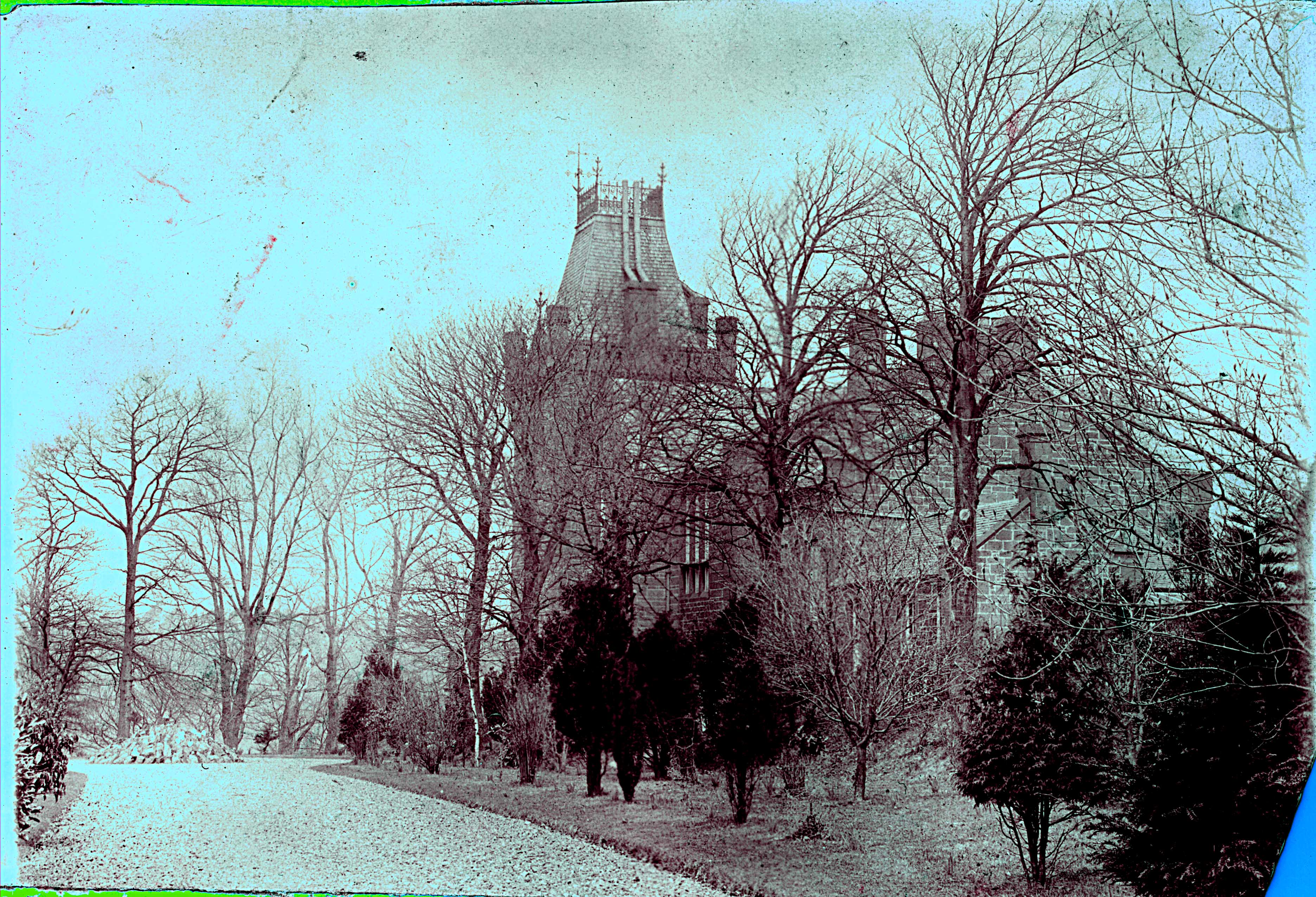
- Dalmore House in the 19th century

- Location within Scotland

General information
- Type: Country House
- Architectural style: Gothic, Tudor, French and Elizabethan
- Coordinates: 55°28′42″N 4°28′44″W
- Completed: 1880-1881
- Destroyed: 1969
- Client: Heron family
- Owner: Mr Cuningham

Design and construction
- Architecture firm: John & Robert Ingram

Dalmore (NS4344023291) was a country house and small estate in the Parish of Stair, East Ayrshire, on the River Ayr, East Ayrshire, Scotland

== History ==
The relatively small estate of Dalmore was originally part of the Barony of Gaitgirth (Gadgirth). Paterson recorded that the family of Scherar held the property in 1615; the Scherars (Shearer) were Burgesses of Ayr. The Earl of Stair held the property in 1696. In 1821 William Heron was the owner, followed by his nephew James Heron; William dying in 1830 and James in 1849. The property was included in the estate of James who died intestate and was claimed by an aunt, Elizabeth McKie as sole next of kin. It subsequently passed into the ownership of William McKie but occupied by William Dunn.William Dunn was once the quarry manager and his wife, was Jessie Mckie (died 1913), her father being William McKie (died 1857), described as a quarryman. William McKie had obtained Dalmore House from the Herons through inheritance. William Dunn died in 1868 and the estate was managed by his widow until their daughter inherited in 1876, having married John Cuninghame Montgomerie in the same year. John Montgomerie remained a proprietor until 1900.

An unusual joint memorial to the Herons, McKies and Dunns of Dalmore is located in the Stair cemetery close to the church.

=== Montgomerie of Dalmore ===
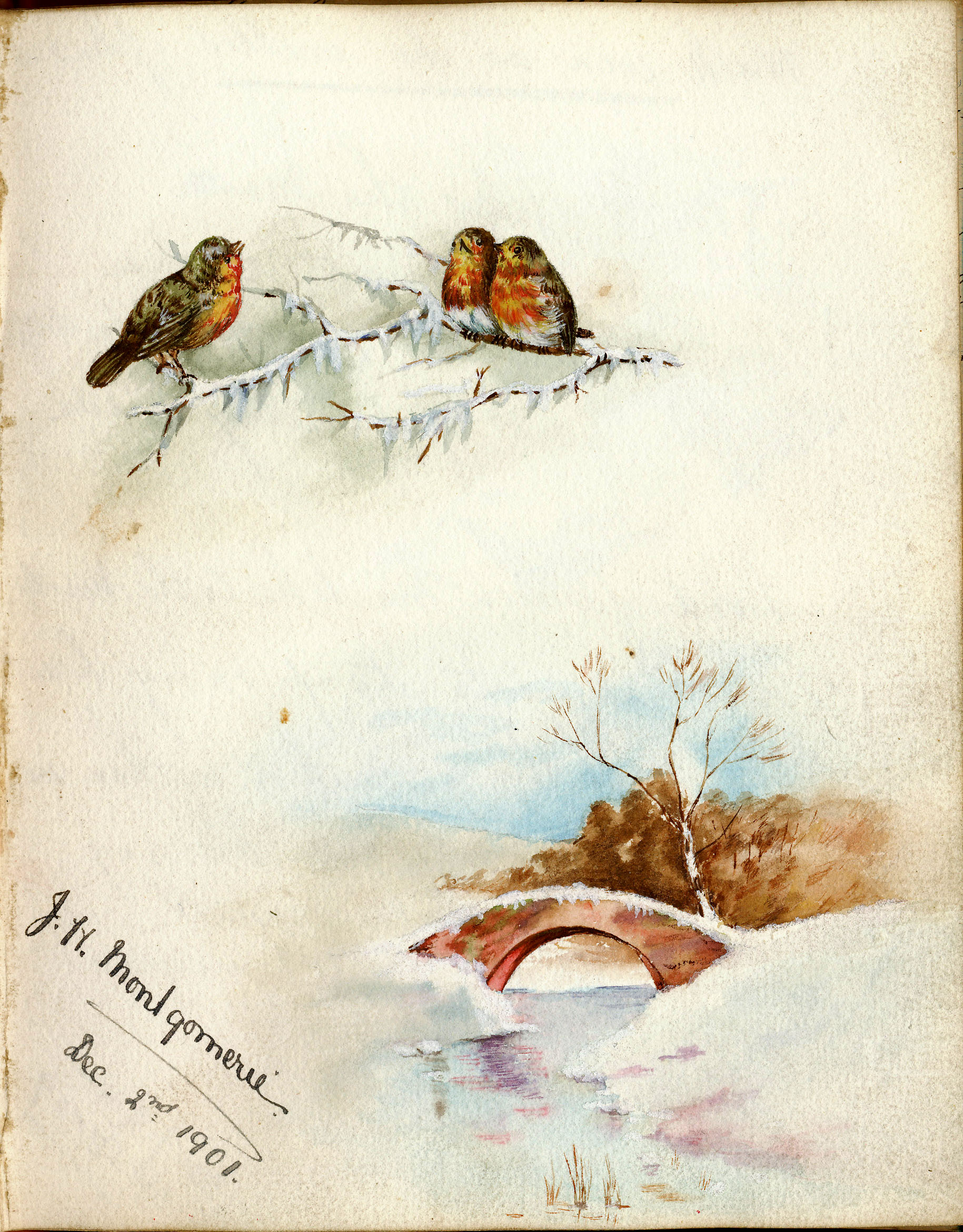
Isabella Montgomerie's 1901 Christmas card

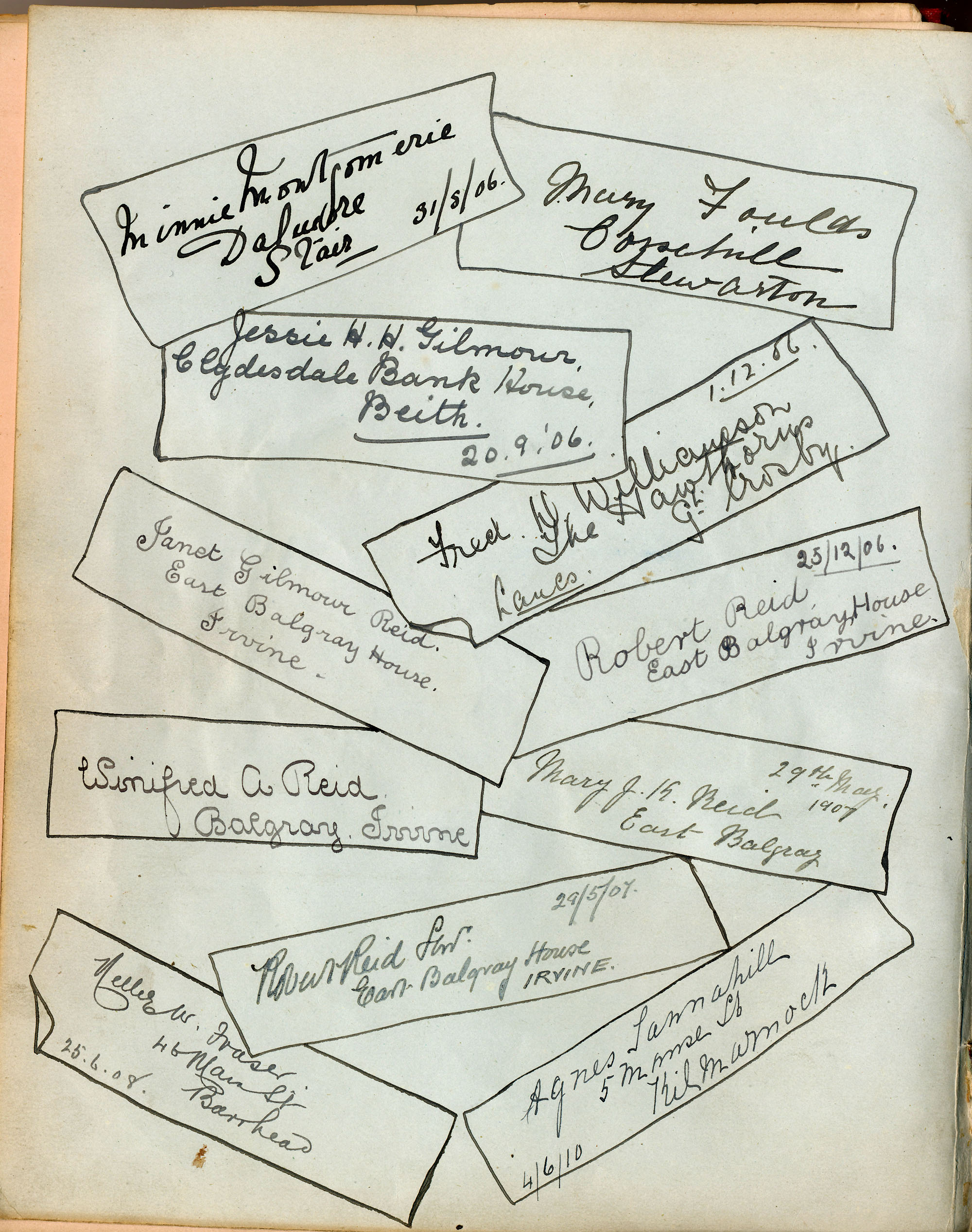
A page from the Bonshaw Visitors' Book

The family memorial in Stair cemetery shows that Jessie Helen Viola Dunn (JHVD), daughter of William Dunn, married John Cuninghame Montgomerie of Bruchag, Bute in 1876. Their first daughter, Mary Elizabeth, was born at Dalmore House in the year that the alterations on Dalmore House were completed, 1881. The Montgomerie family had five daughters and a son, John Cuninghame Montgomerie (died, Ayr, 1974).

=== Dalmore House ===
The architect David Bryce, the architect of the Bank of Scotland remodelling and extension, 1864–1870, is recorded as having worked on Dalmore House prior to 1868 and this may be an earlier house to which alterations and extensions were made in the 1880s. Dalmore House was completed in 1880–81 by the architects John and Robert Ingram for the Heron family. As shown by the illustration the house was an eccentric collection of styles, including Gothic, Tudor, French and Elizabethan styles. The owners clearly had problems with the chimneys and smoke as can be seen from the highly unusual presence of metal pipe vents.

In 1916 a machinery shed and water supply were added.

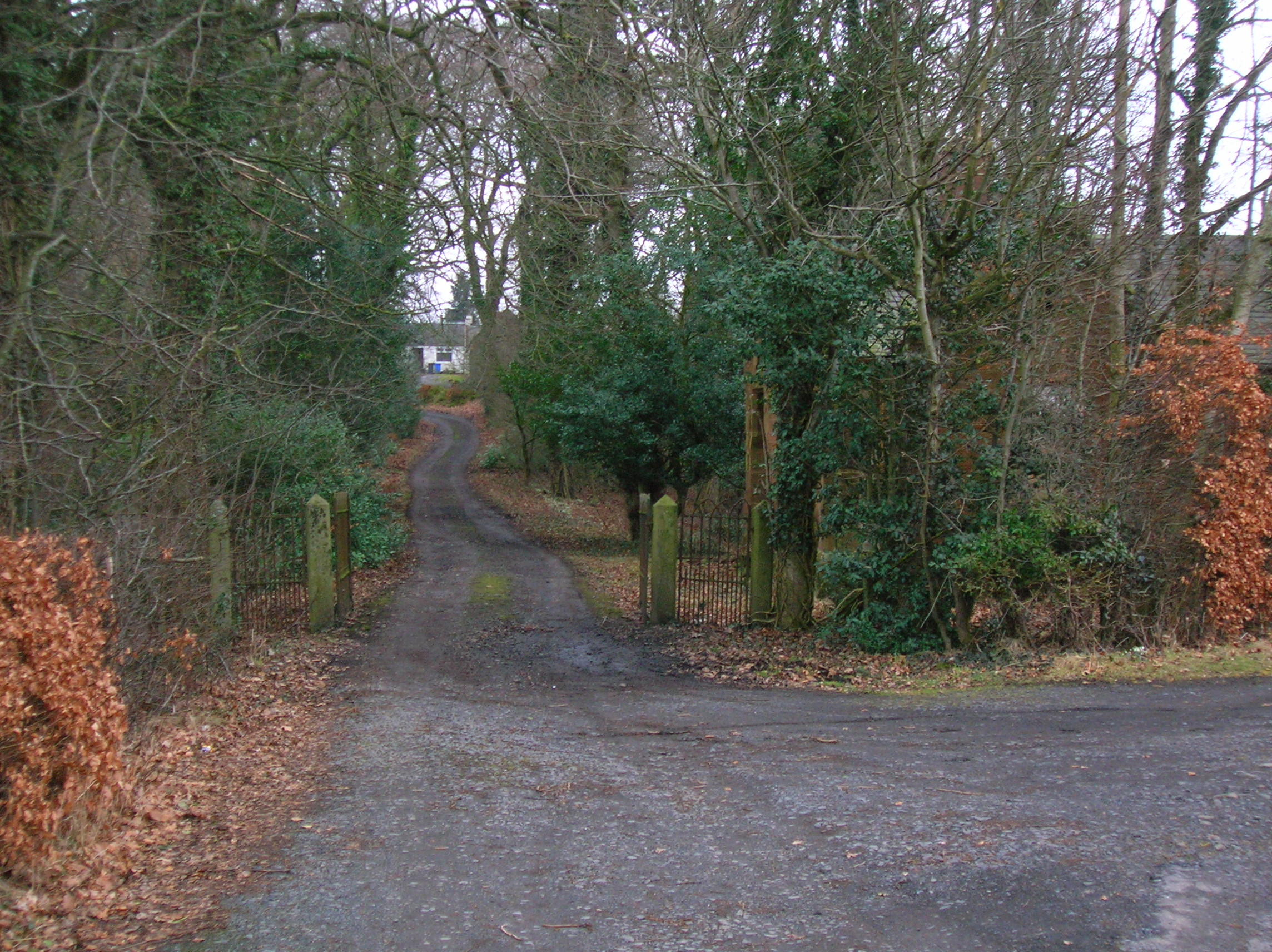
The old entrance way to Dalmore House

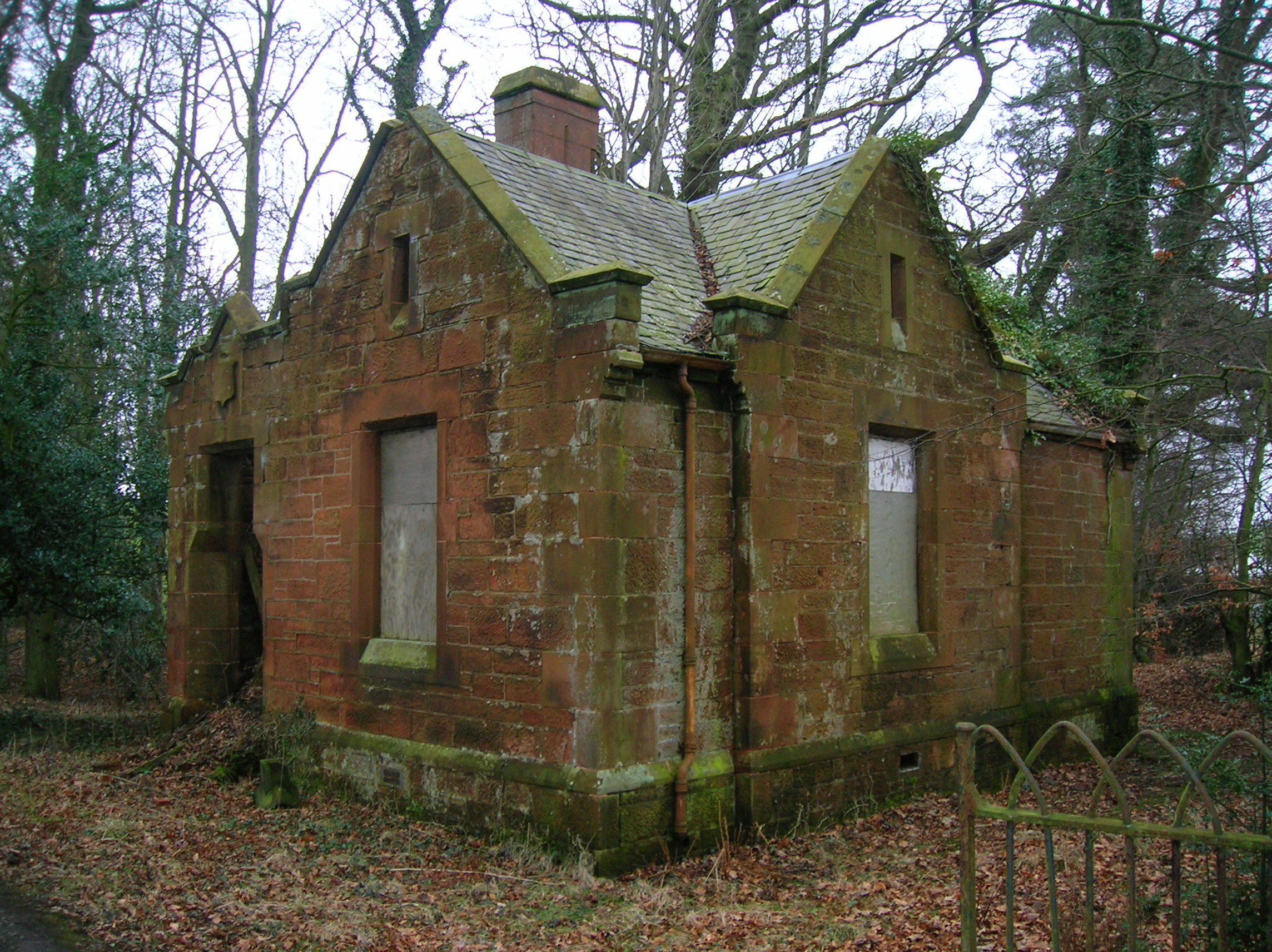
The old entrance lodge house

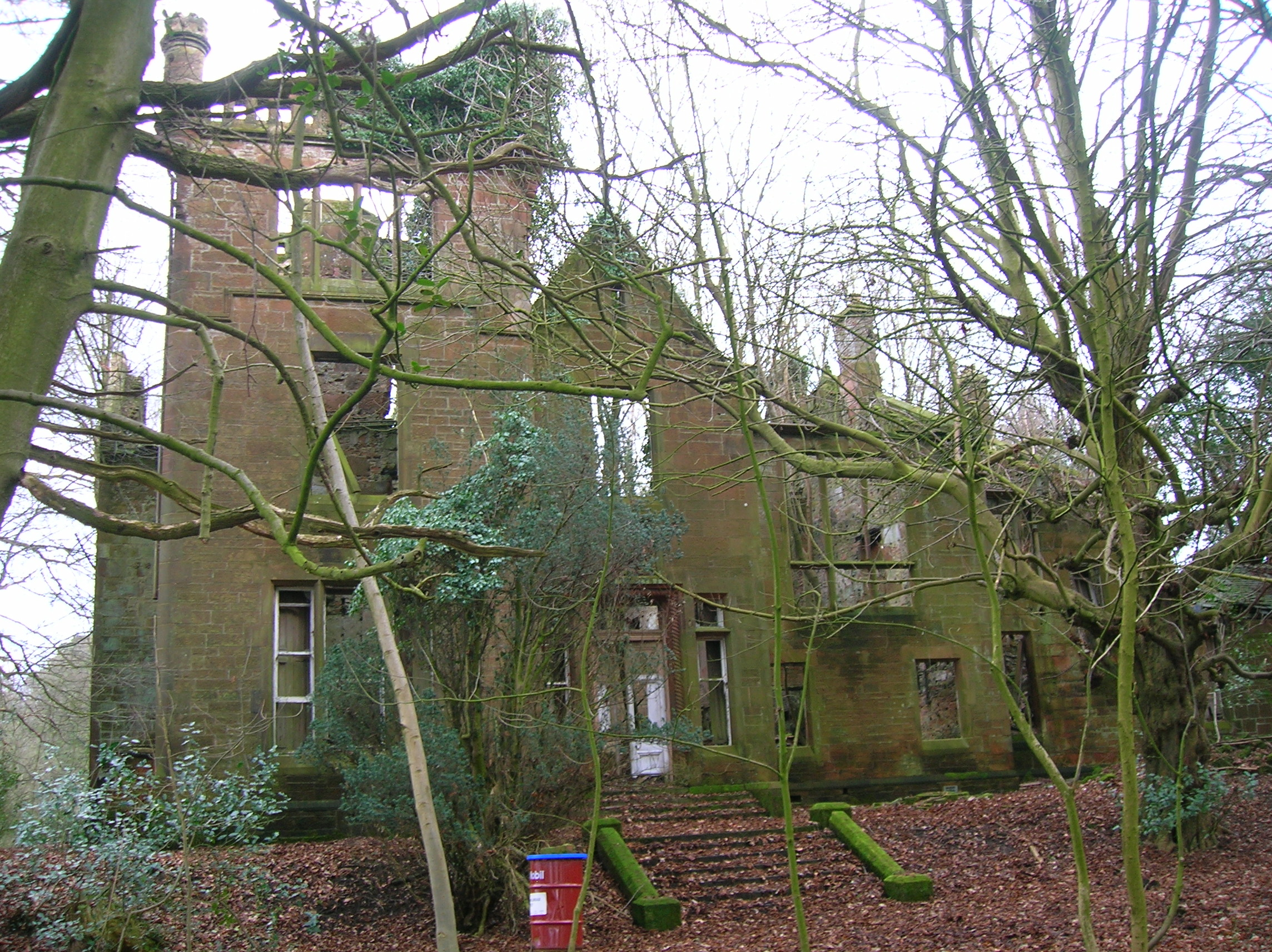
The ruins

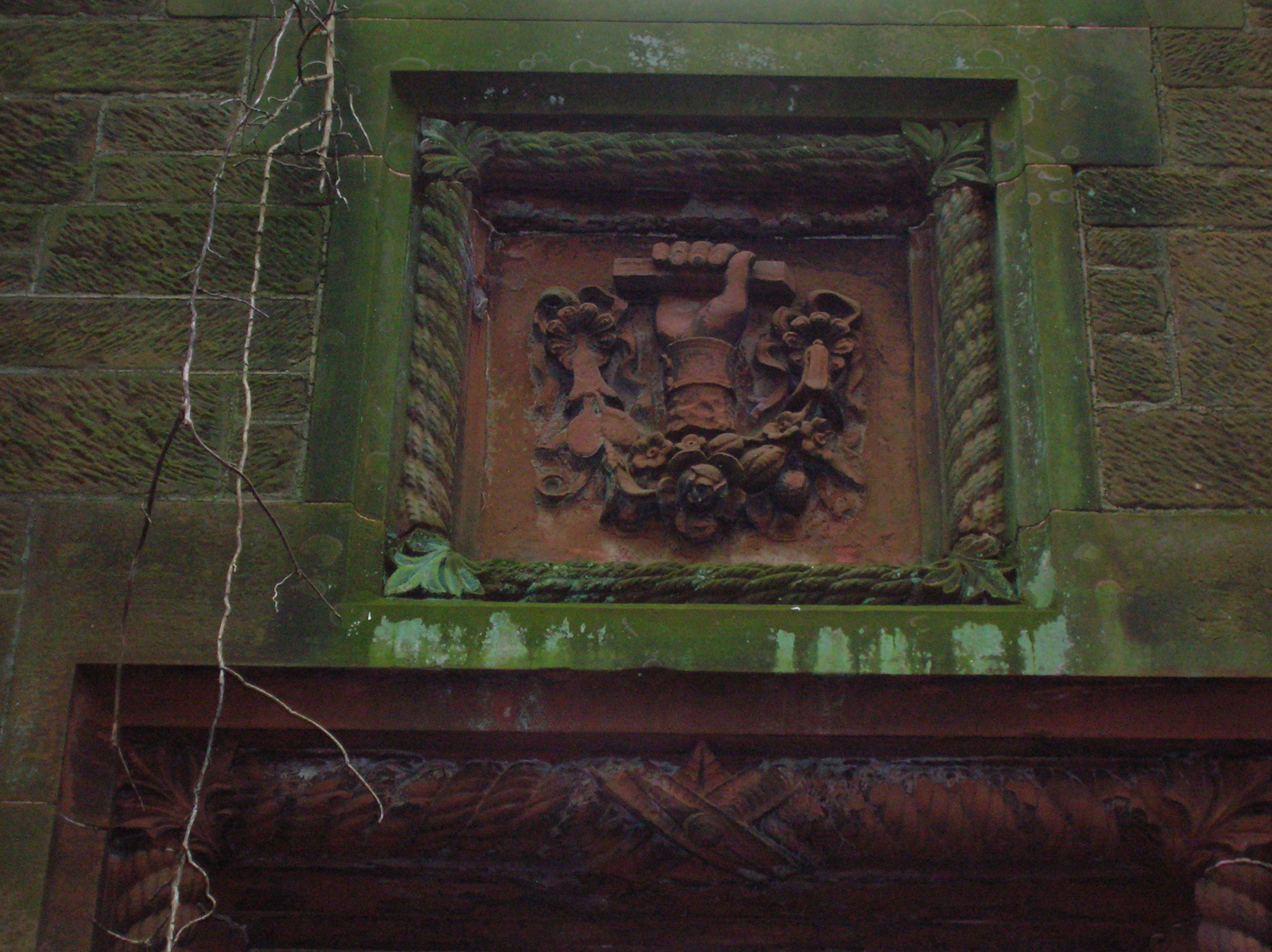
Armorial panel with a fist grasping a hone stone
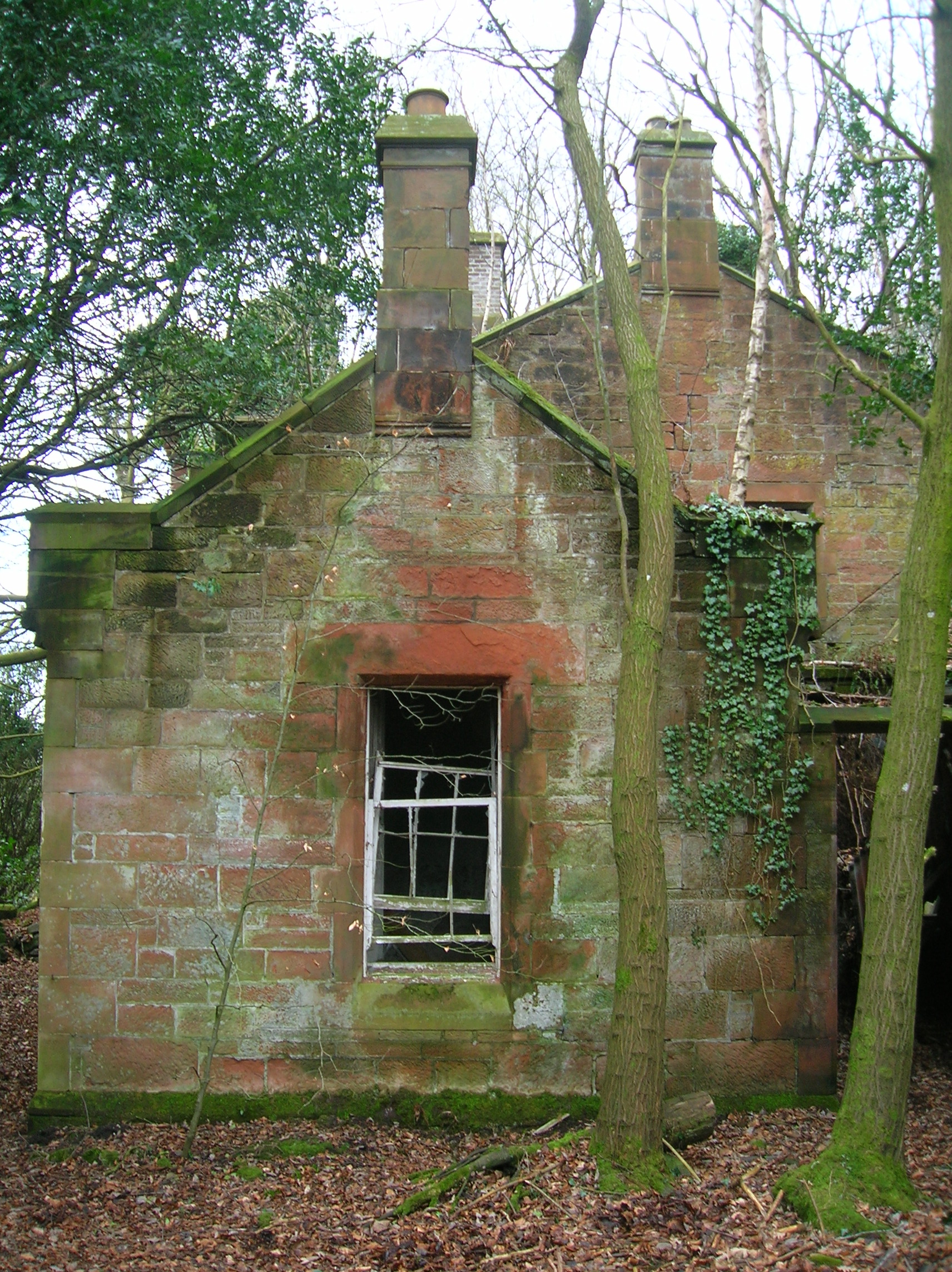
Servant's quarters

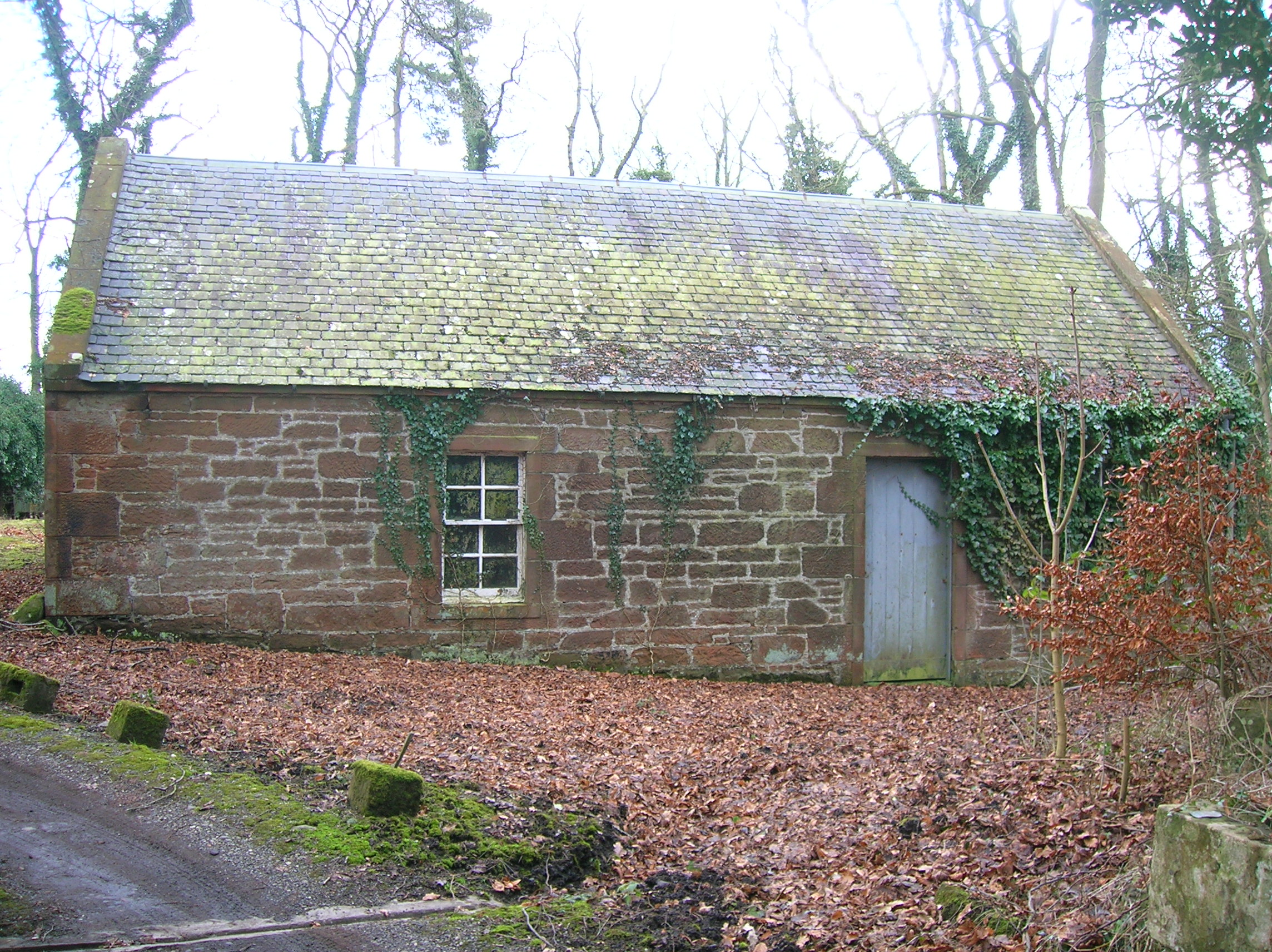
Store house, Dalmore Mains

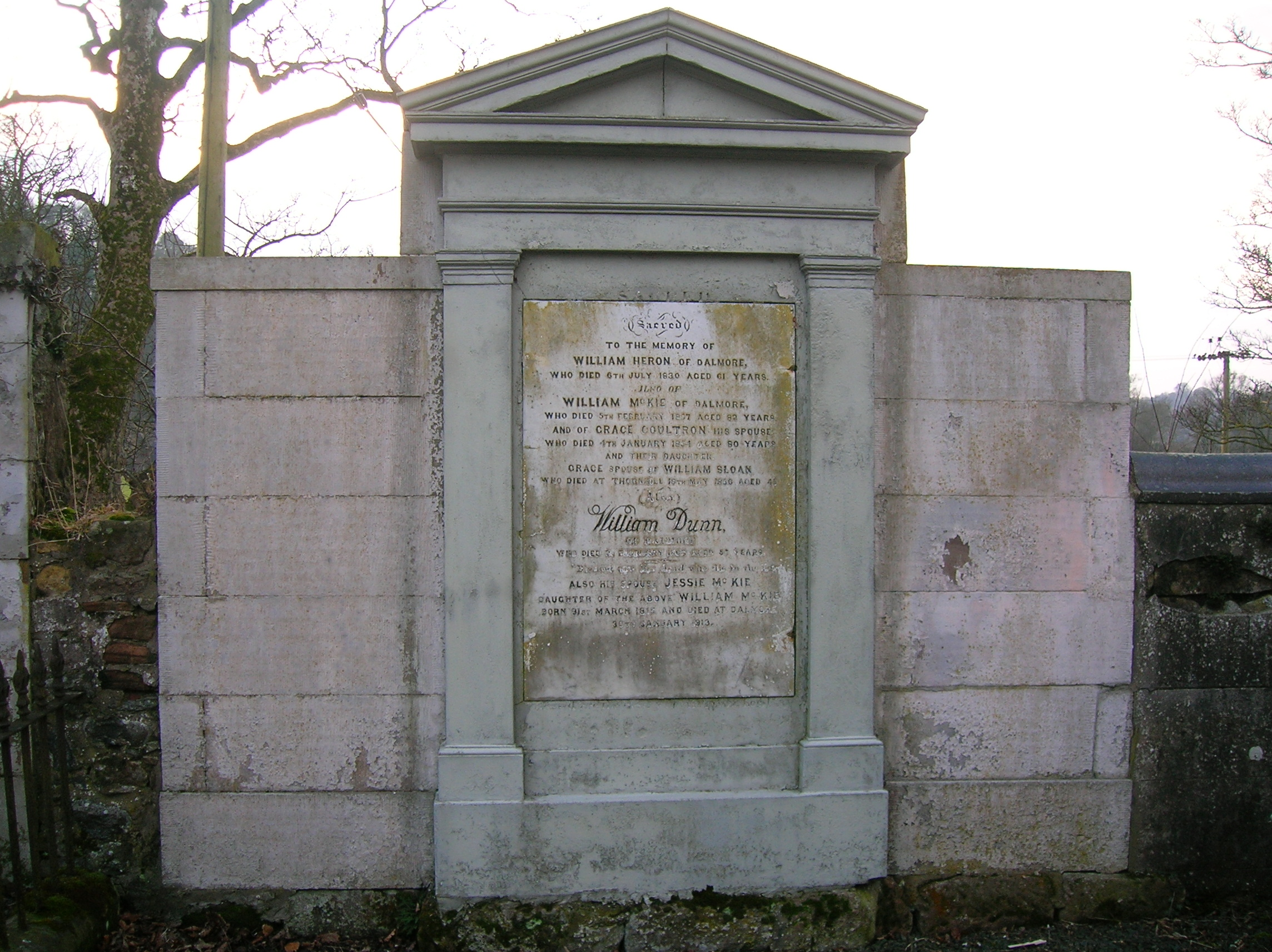
Memorial to the Heron, McKie and Dunn of Dalmore

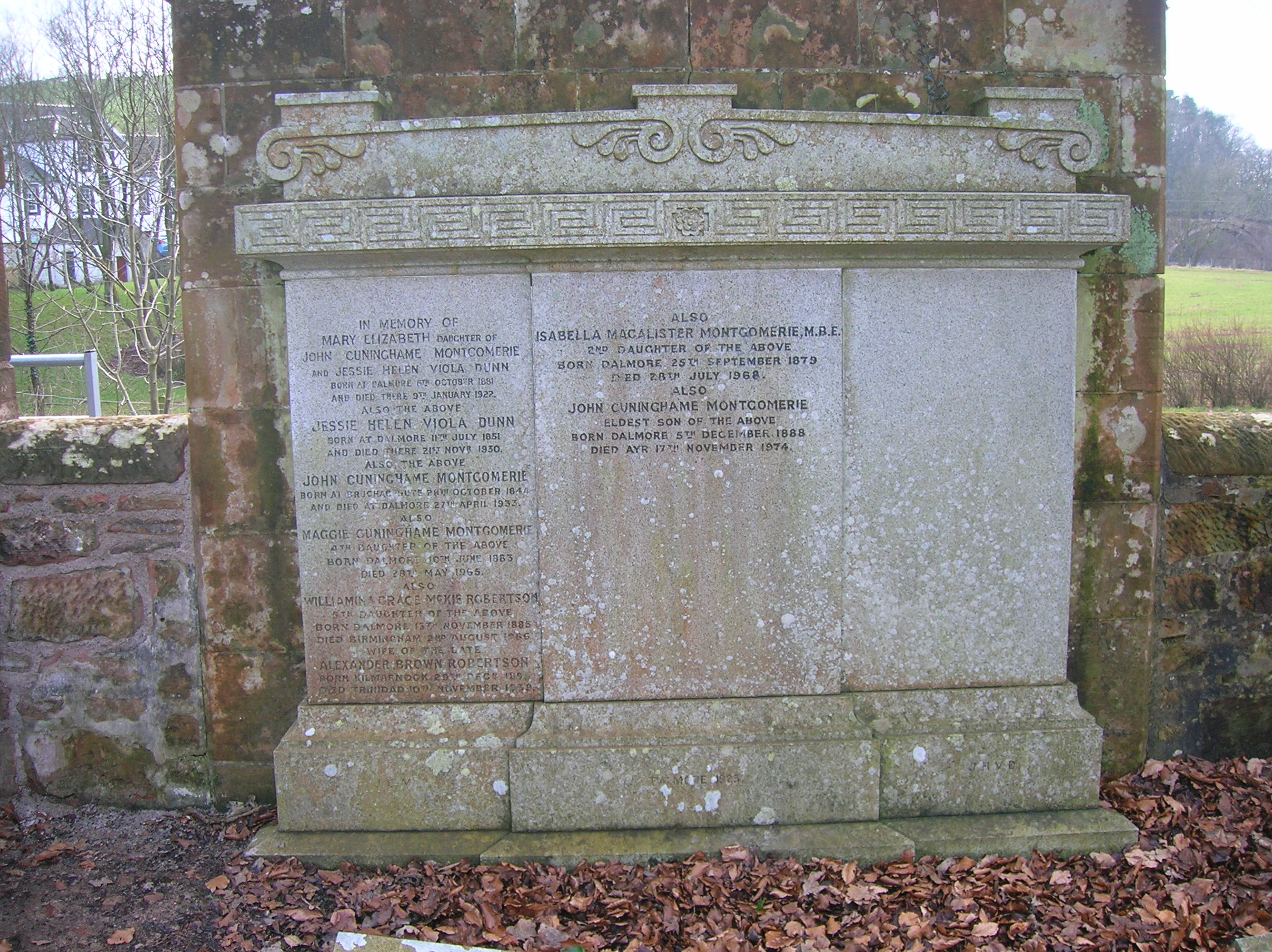
Montgomerie family of Dalmore House memorial

Dalmore House became uninhabitable in the early 1960s, recognised as such after John Montgomerie moved into the property with his new and much younger wife, his ex-secretary. The house was found to be riddled with dry rot and was condemned; John and his wife moved out and went to live in Sandfield Road, Ayr. John Montgomerie died in Ayr in 1974; as recorded on the family memorial in Stair cemetery.

After the fire in April 1969 (Tucker states 1958) the stone walls of the house, the abandoned and ruinous entrance lodge and the still occupied stable cottages remain. The property is still owned by the Montgomerie family who are now based in Coylton.

On Blaeu's 1654 map the site is named 'Dalmoir'. The name Dalmore may come from the Gaelic 'dail mòr', meaning 'big field'.

== Local industries ==
=== Graphite ===
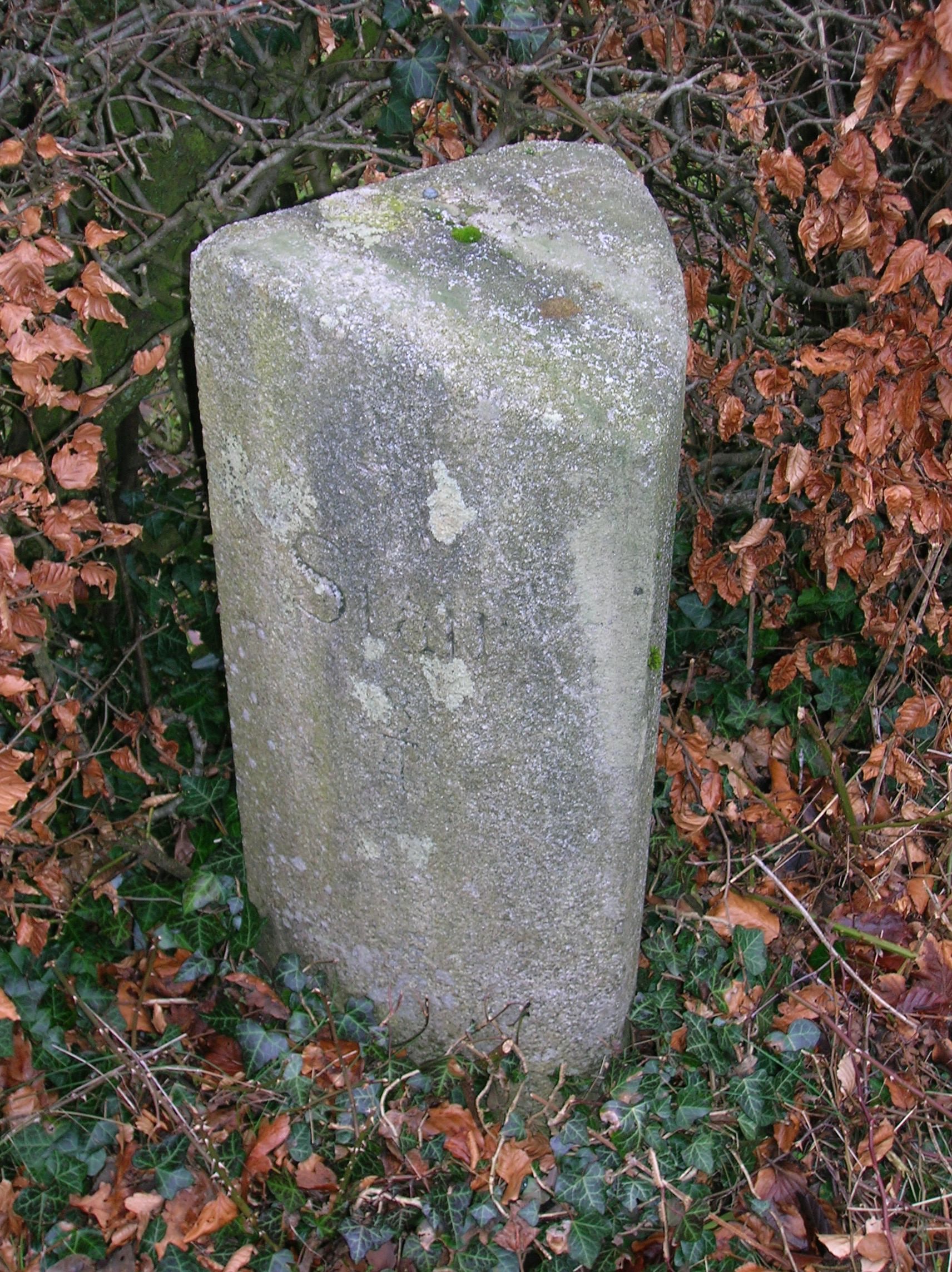
Old Stair to Ayr turnpike milestone at Dalmore

A plumbago, graphite or 'black-lead' quarry was noted from 1791, located at Laigh Dalmore and worked between 1808 and 1815, milling being carried out at Dalmore Mill. Between 1815 and 1830 William Heron erected a mill to pulverise the graphite but he did not proceed on a commercial scale. Nothing was left to e seen of the deposit by 1935. The mill was then extended and used for carding wool. By 1841, however, it was used only for the dressing of whetstone.

=== Coal ===
The No 11 coal pit was near Dalmore Farm; Willie McIlwraith, a farmer there in later years, had a narrow escape when the shaft pit collapsed whilst he was ploughing over it. A Mowlum steam engine was used to sink the shaft in 1877 and this was later used at the Hone pit.

=== Hone stone ===
Originally hone stones were taken from the riverbed, however as early as 1789 a quarry for whetstone existed on the estate, producing whetstones known either as 'Water-of-Ayr' stone or 'Tam o' Shanter' stone depending on their geological characteristics; The Hone Works themselves were situated west of the Stair Bridge. In 1789 a Mr Smith of Mauchline held the lease to one of the quarries; possibly the one situated near Stair Wood, beside the Glenstang Burn, as marked on the OS map. This Smith is well known for his family's involvement in the famous 'Mauchline ware'. William Aiton in 1808 records that extensive use of hone took place at Gadgirth. The Laigh Dalmore mine was drained until about 1938 using a beam engine with a 20 ft. beam, supplied with steam by a Lancashire boiler.

Three buildings made up the Dalmore Mill complex, one of which is two-storeys high and partly unroofed due to vandalism in 2003. The works finally closed circa 1990, although some stone was still being worked in 2000. A suspension footbridge, dating from 1902, crosses the river to Milton Mill which was part of the complex.

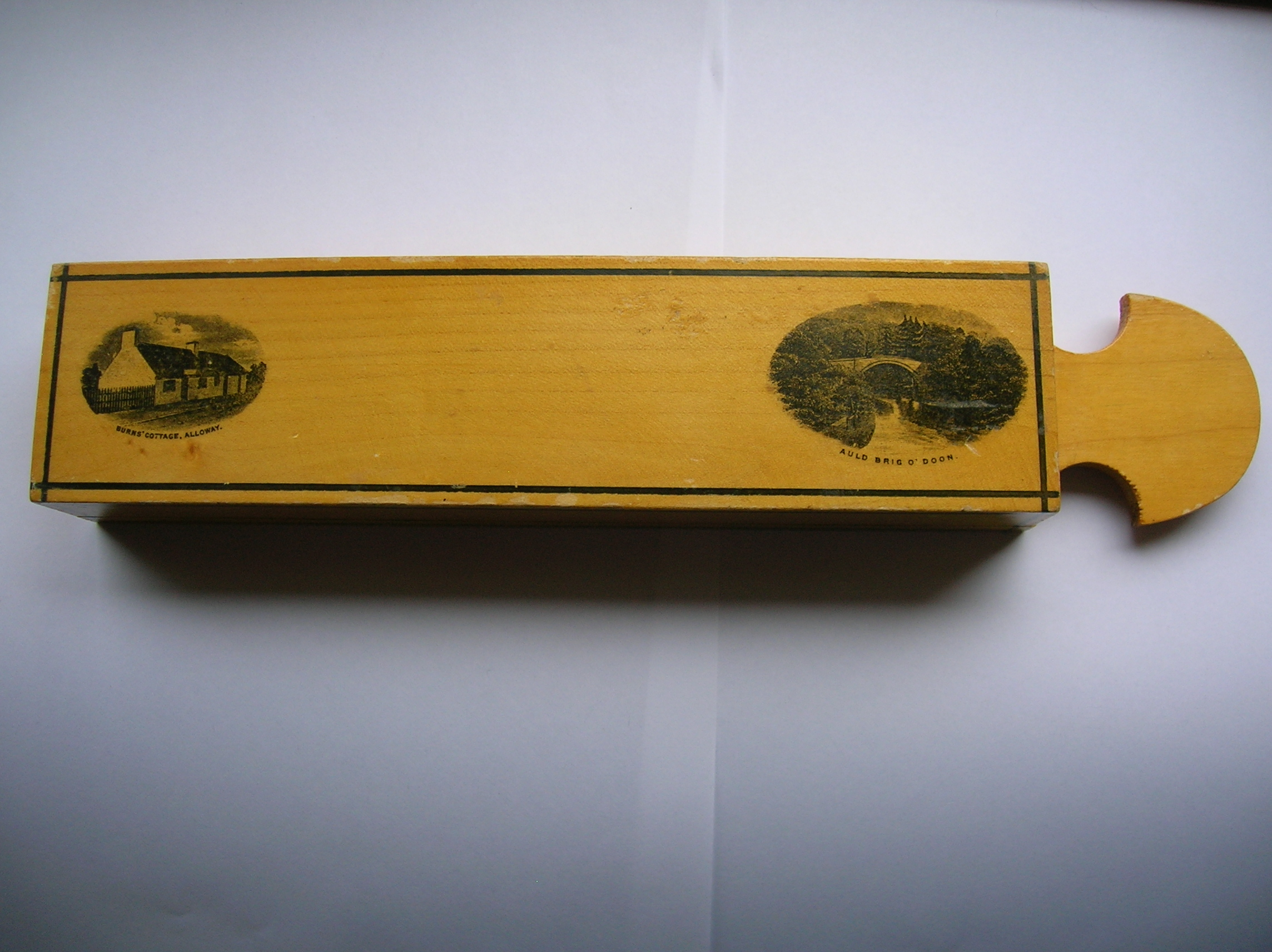
A Mauchline Ware hone stone case

The lade is still visible as a shallow ditch running from the river to the mill, a sluice originally controlling the water flow. A sizeable and unusual sculpture of a sheaf of corn with the name 'W Heron, 1821' is located on the mill wall, part of which was rebuilt after a German plane jettisoned incendiary bombs onto it in 1942.

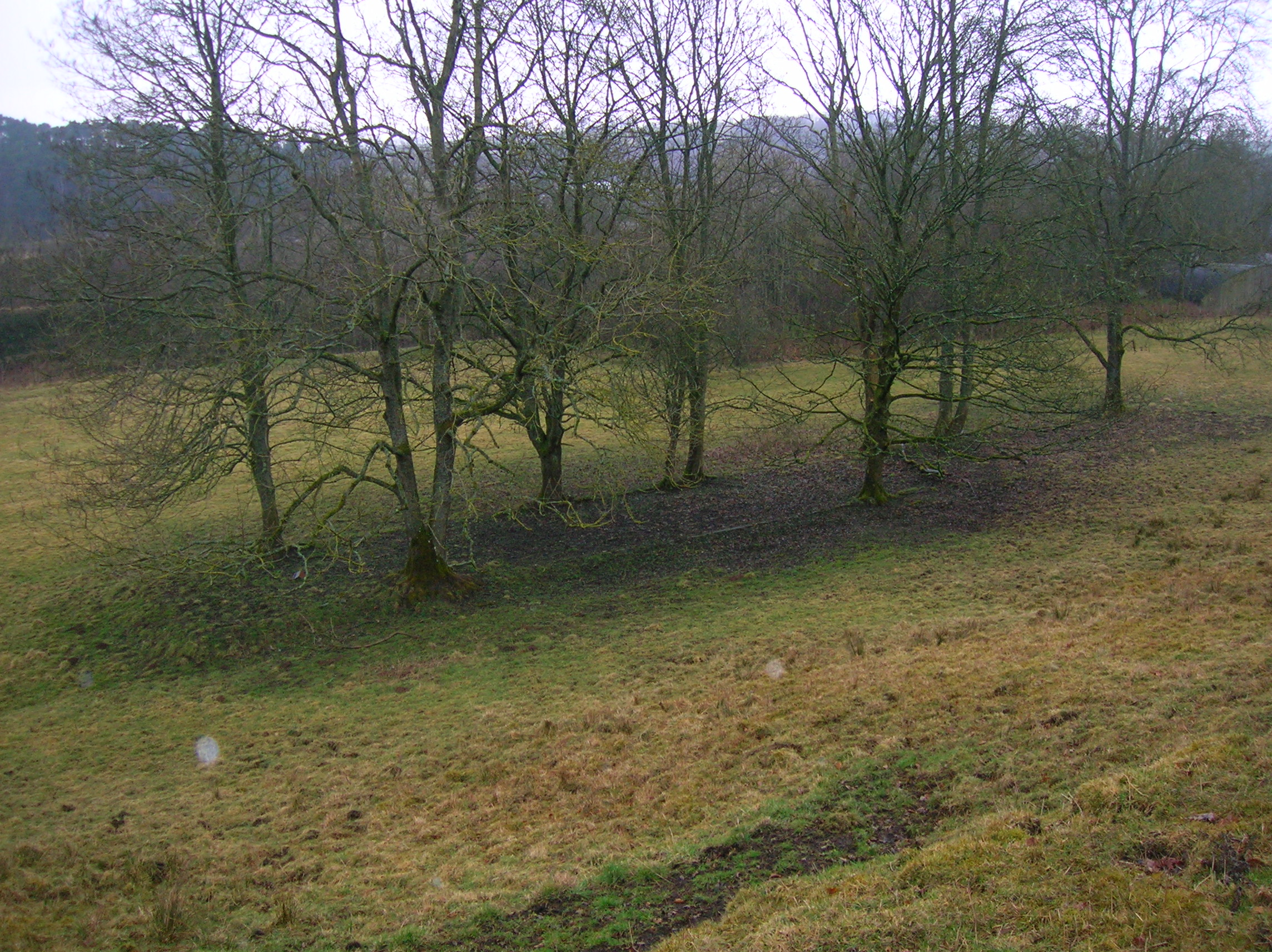
Dalmore holm and foundations of a structure beneath the mature trees

The mill at Milton had originally been a woollen mill, opened on New Year's Day 1830 by Mr Heron of Dalmore House and working until 1908. William (1795–1847) and Andrew (1797–1869) Smith were sons of William Smith, a mason in Mauchline. In the 1820s it is recorded that the brothers were running a Hone stone factory at Milton Mill and it is thought that the Smith brothers diversified as Box Makers and established the famous Mauchline Ware manufacture in the village of Mauchline because they wished to have their own source of cases for their 'Water of Ayr Stones'. Milton Mill generated electricity for the works from 1935 to 1964 using a turbine until a flood wrecked the motors; a Boving turbine installed circa 1935 provided power to the mine, the machinery being in a separate building.

In 1857 Dalmore Mill was described as 'A hone mill worked by water-10 horse power-two storeys high, slated and in good repair'. In later years Dalmore Mill housed the offices and stores. The stone from the aforementioned Dalmore Quarry was dressed and polished at the mill which was the property of William Dun Esq. of Dalmore House at that time.

The Dalmore Waggonway

The 1902 OS map shows a narrow-gauge mineral railway running from Laigh Dalmore quarry to Dalmore Mill; a number of the old rails are stacked (2010) in the old quarry. The Victorian photograph of Enterkine shows the track in situ, although no railway sleepers are visible. Sidings may have been present. The gauge was 20 inch, the same as the tracks in the mine and the line was worked by horses until about 1945 when it was taken up and a horse and cart were used instead; later a lorry was employed.

=== Saw mill ===
A sawmill was present on the Dalmore Estate.

=== Turnpikes ===
The old Ayr to Stair turnpike runs past the entrance to Dalmore House and the milestone is still located on the roadside verge near the entrance to Dalmore. The old toll house still stands beside the road down to Stair.

=== Views of the Tam o' Shanter Hone works ===
The works had been owned by the Heron family and their successors of Dalmore House. The house was directly connected to Dalmore Mill by a lane.

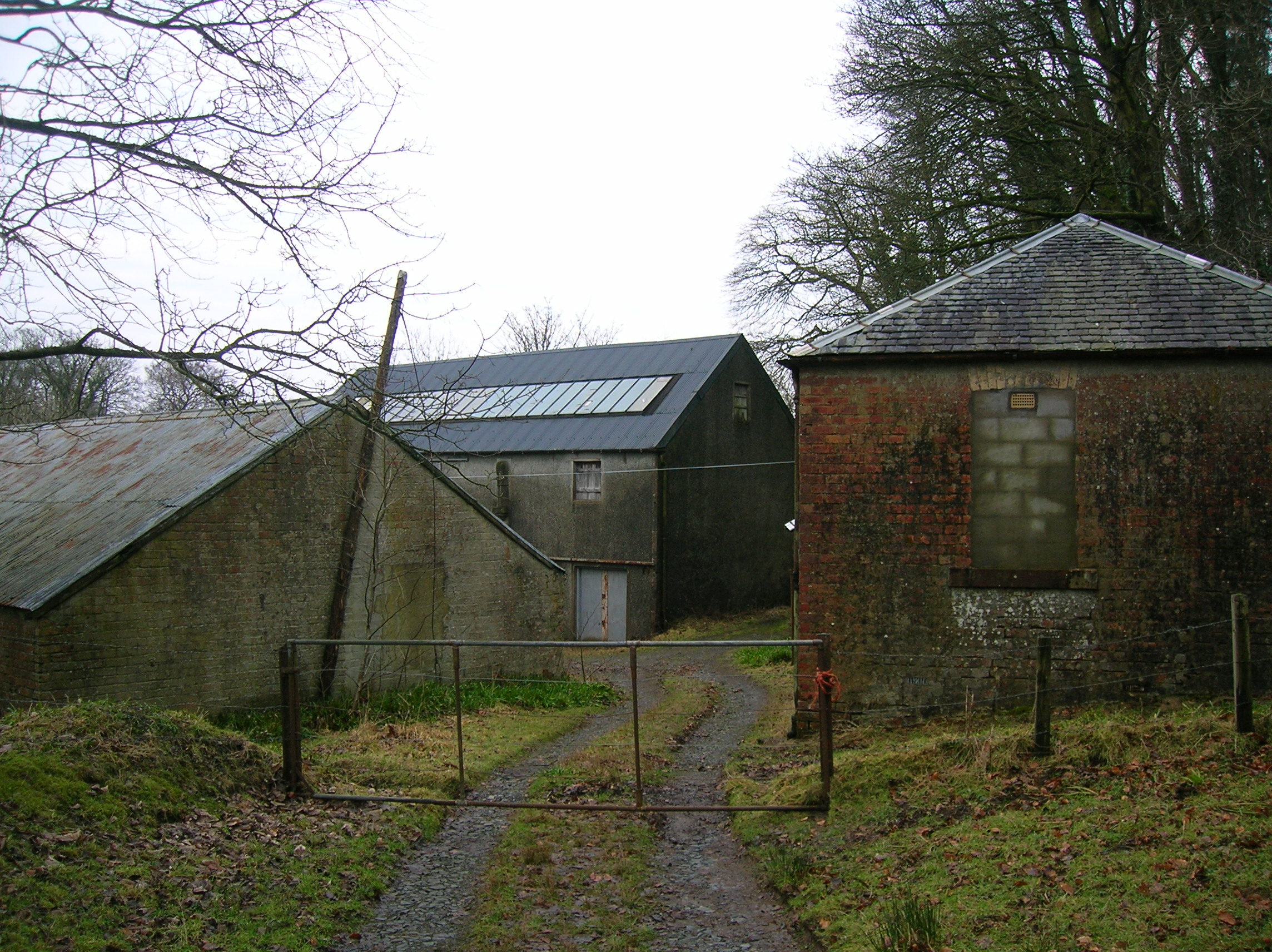
Dalmore Mill

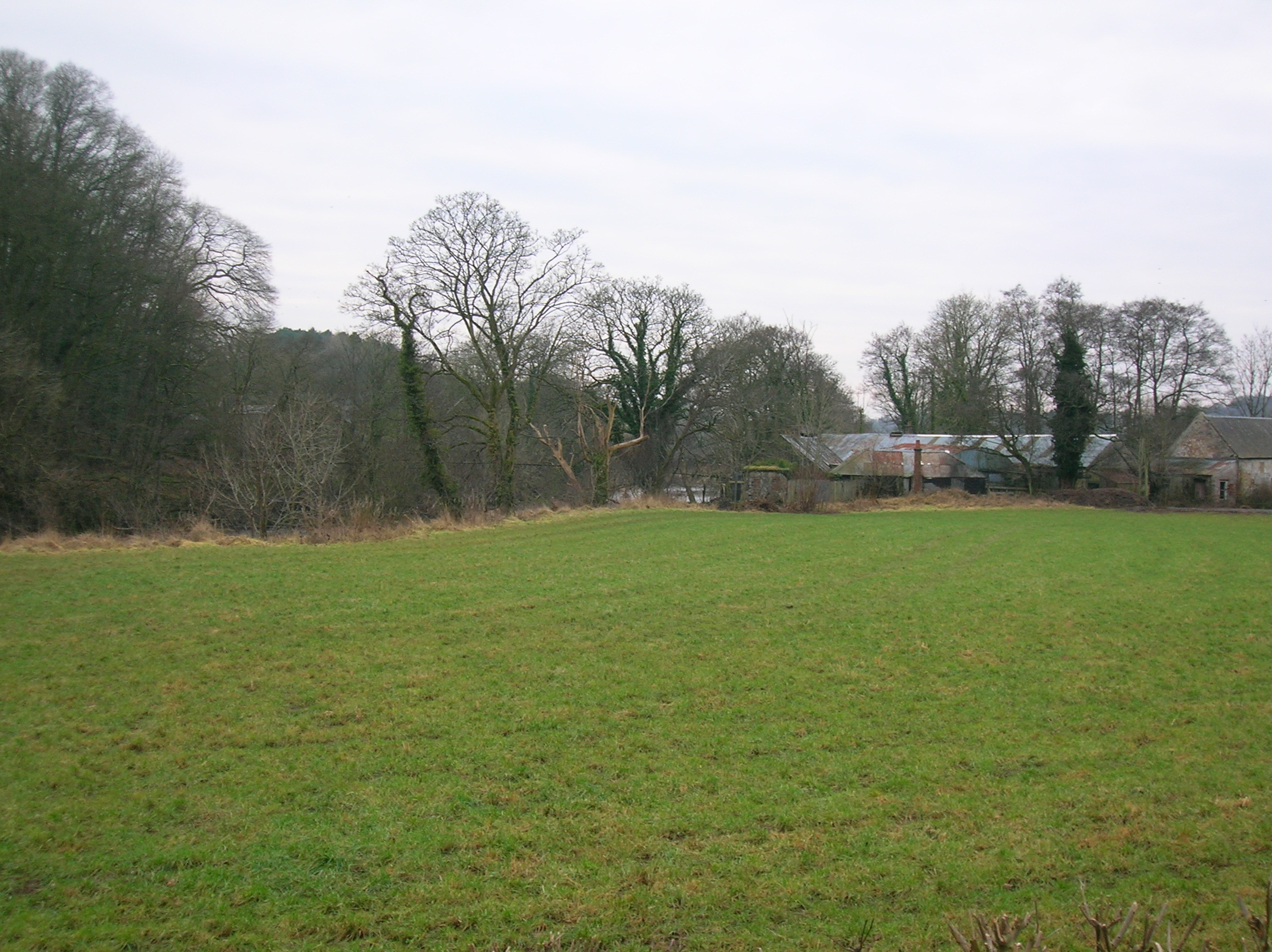
Milton Mill

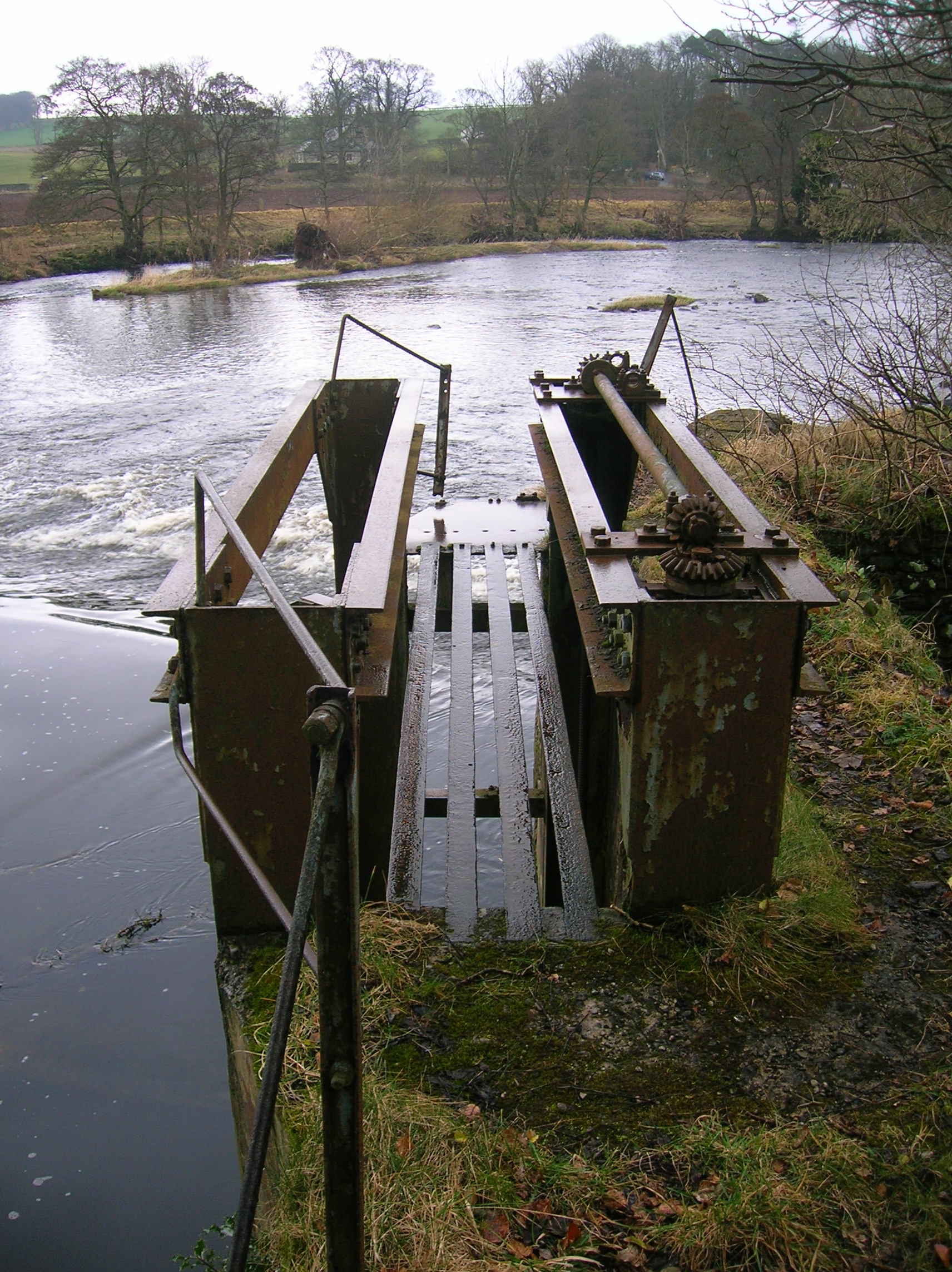
Sluice for Milton Mill

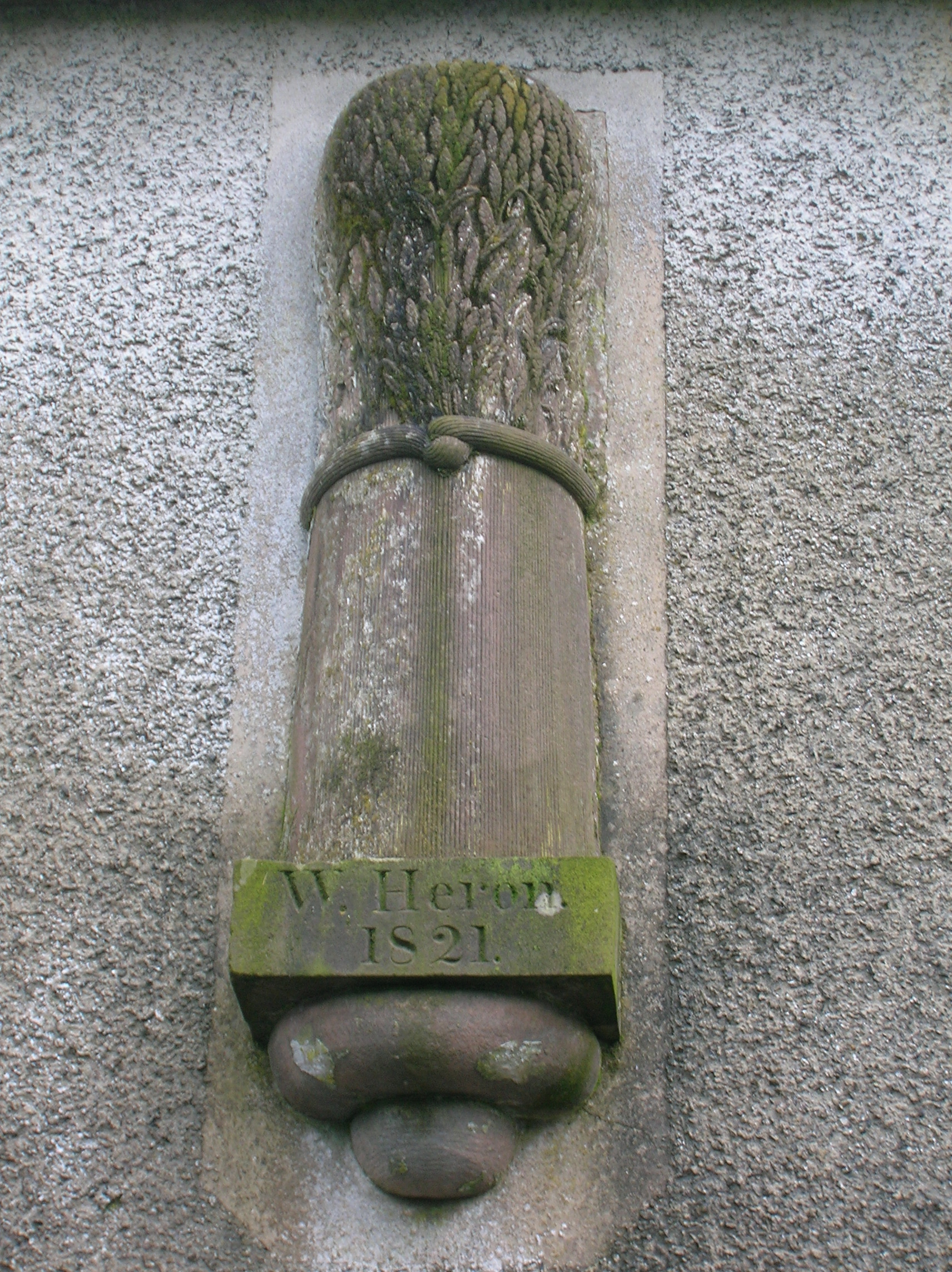
Wheat sheaf and inscription

A pedestrian suspension bridge over the River Ayr linked the two mills together. Grindstones and other items were taken up to Dalmore's gardens as ornamental features.

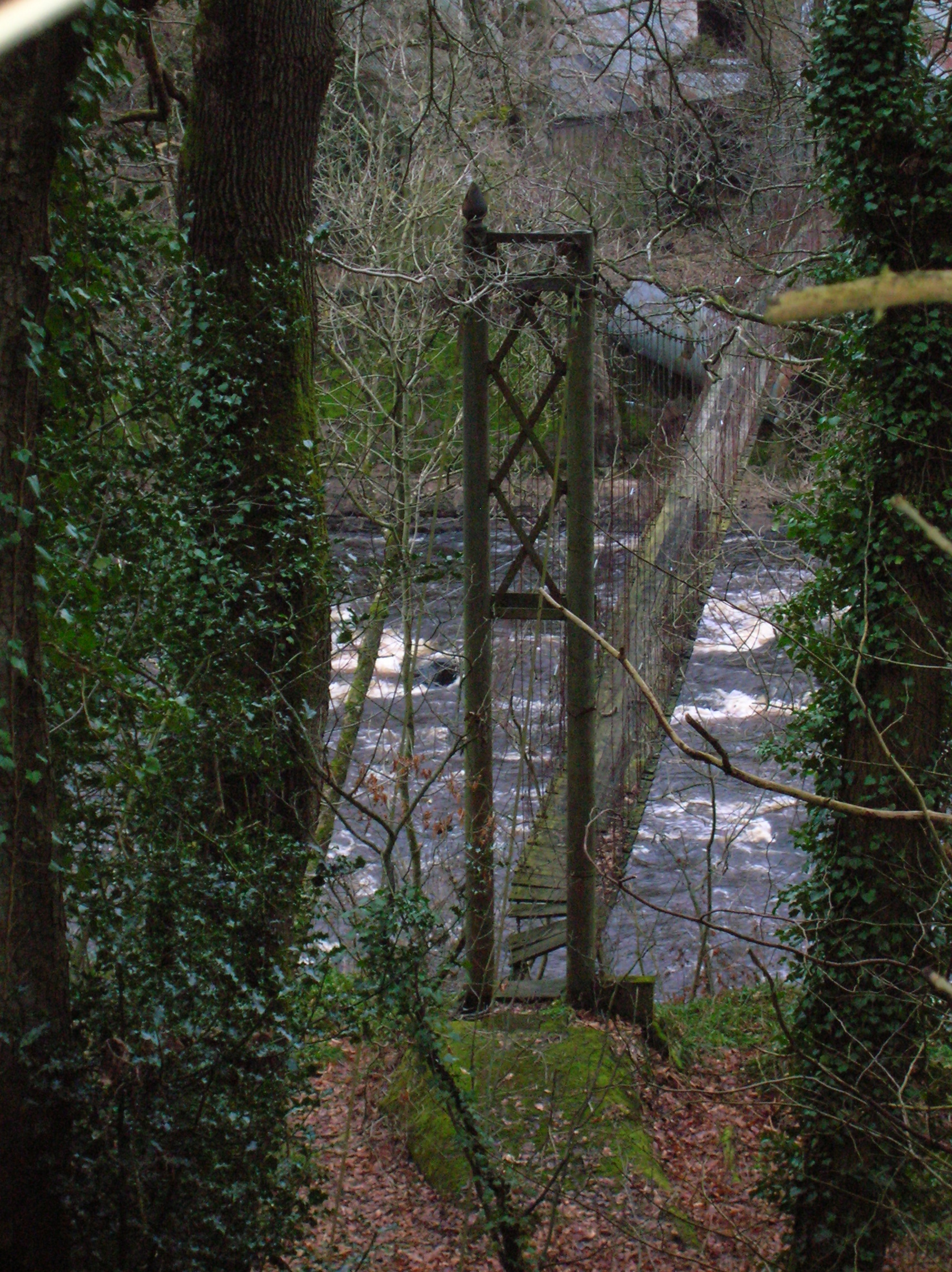
Dalmore Mill suspension bridge

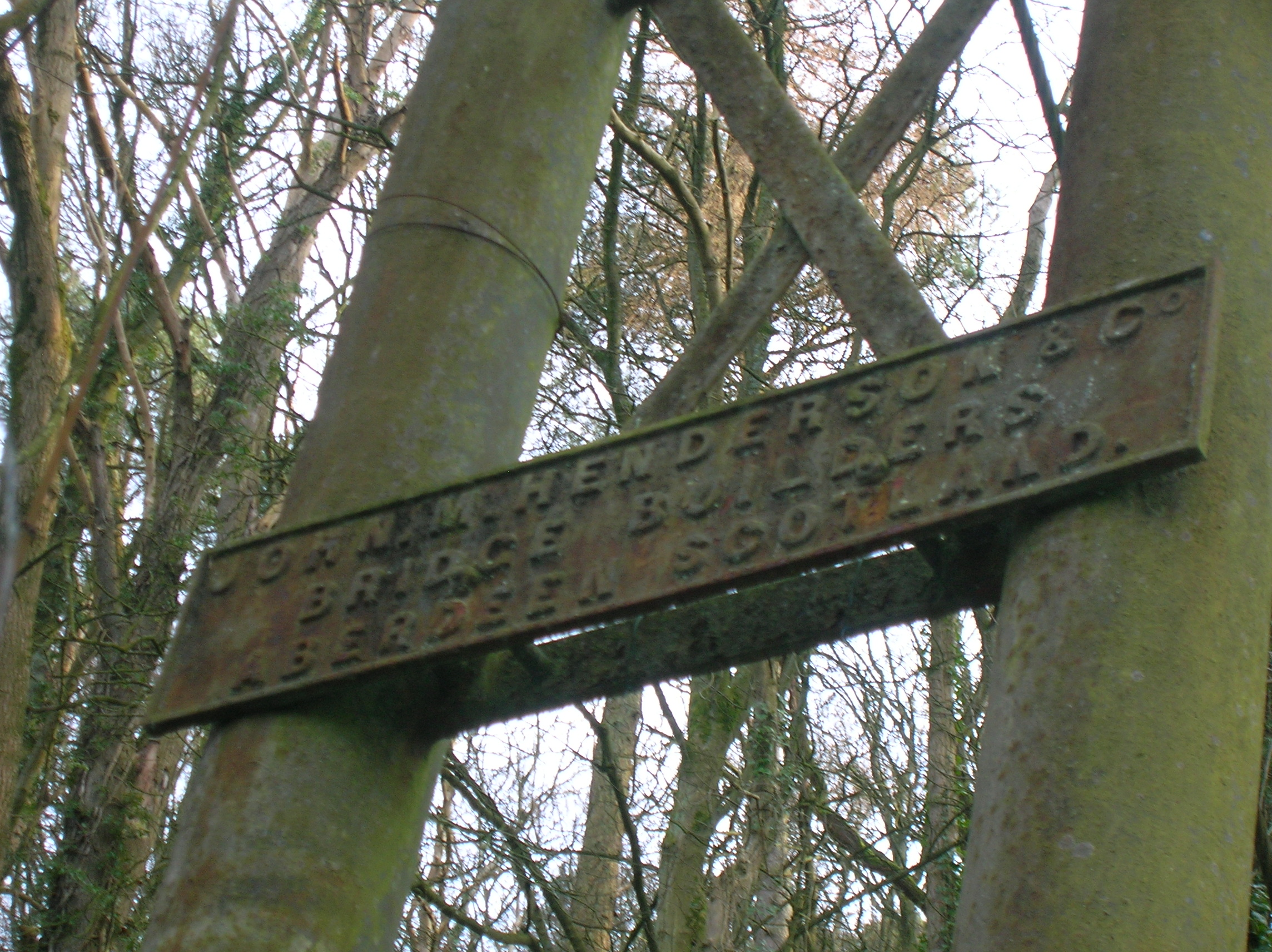
Suspension bridge makers plate

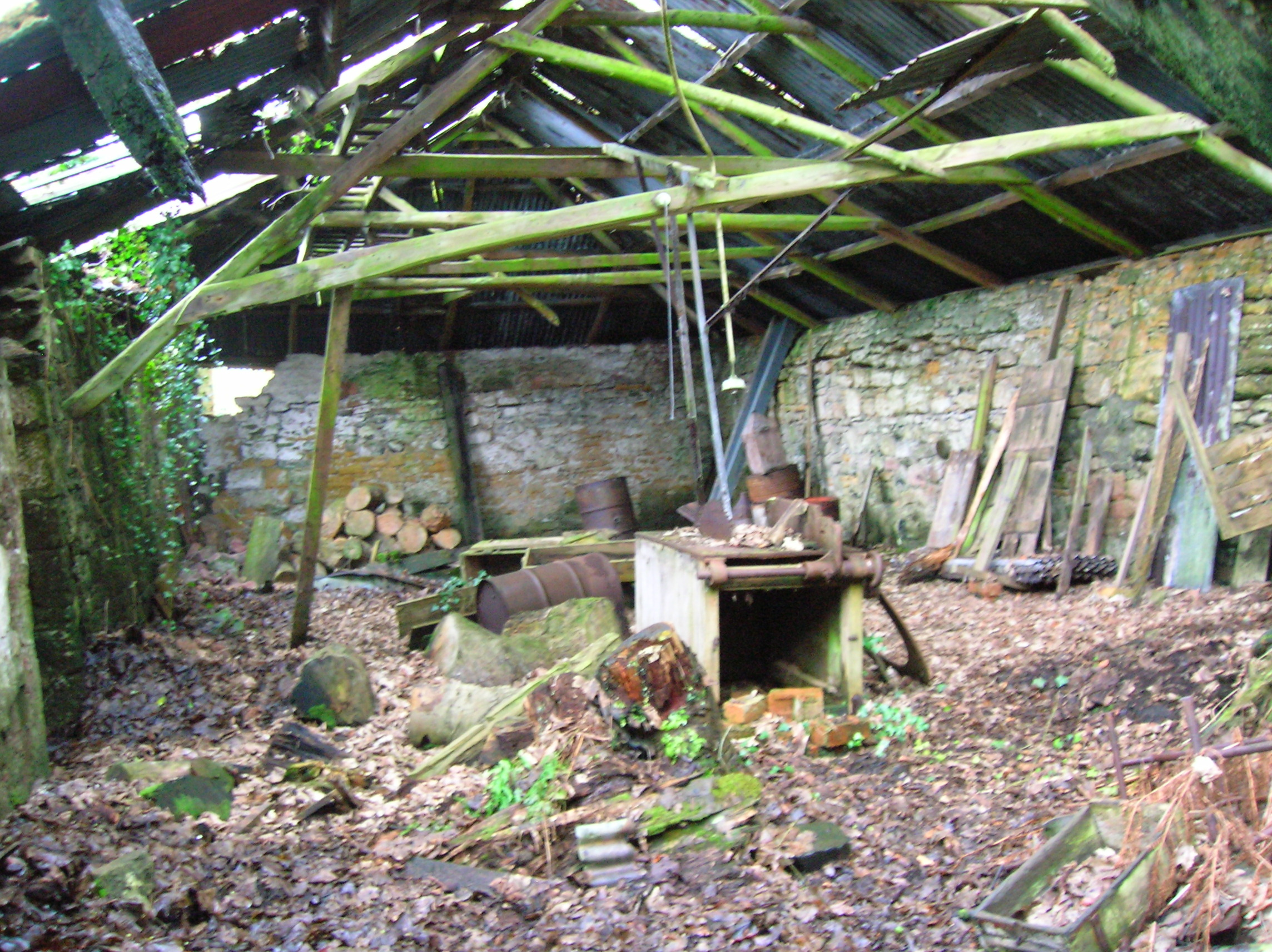
Interior of a Dalmore Mill outbuilding

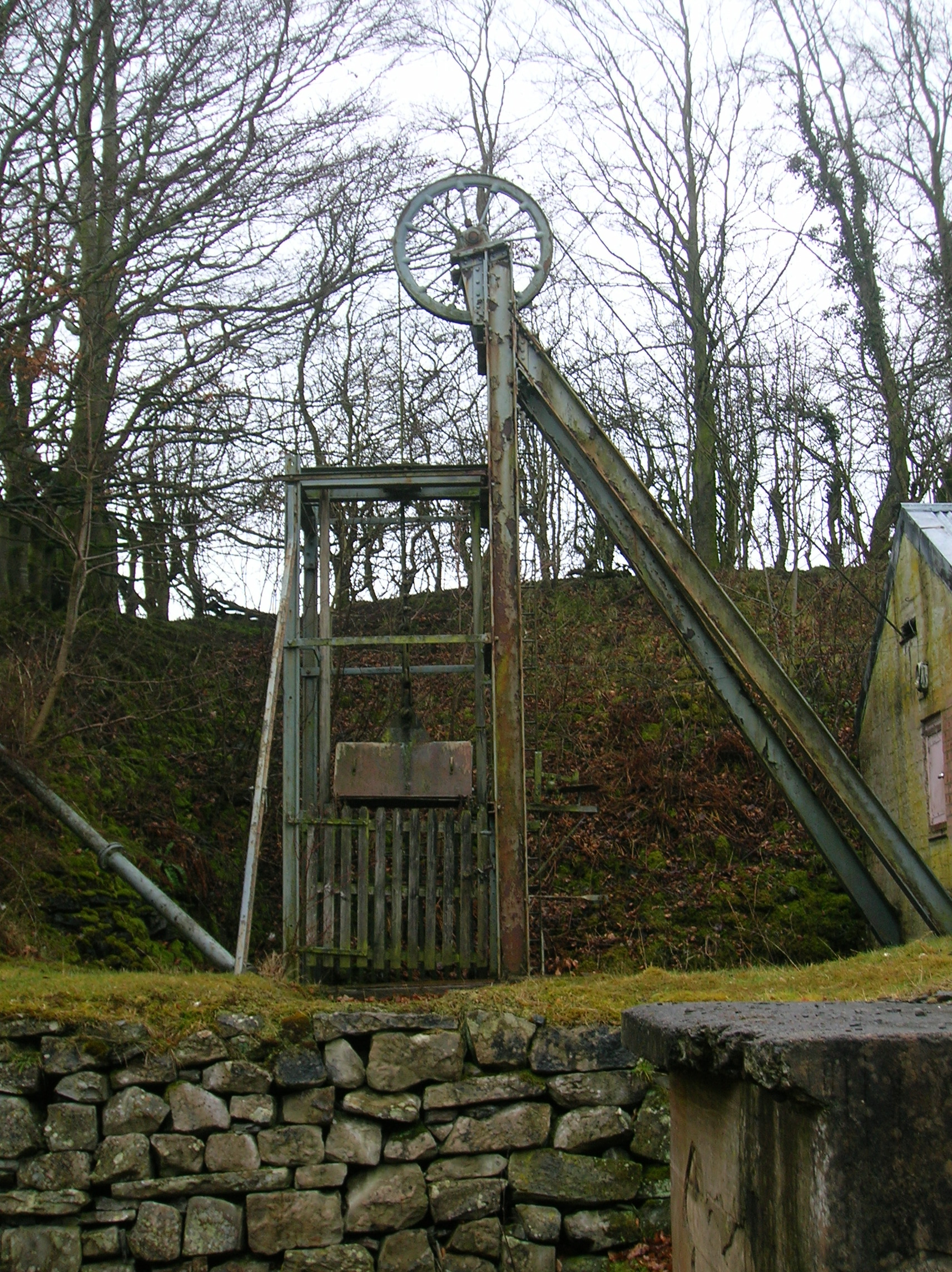
Laigh Dalmore Quarry and mine pithead gear

At first the hone stone was quarried, however, later it had to be mined.

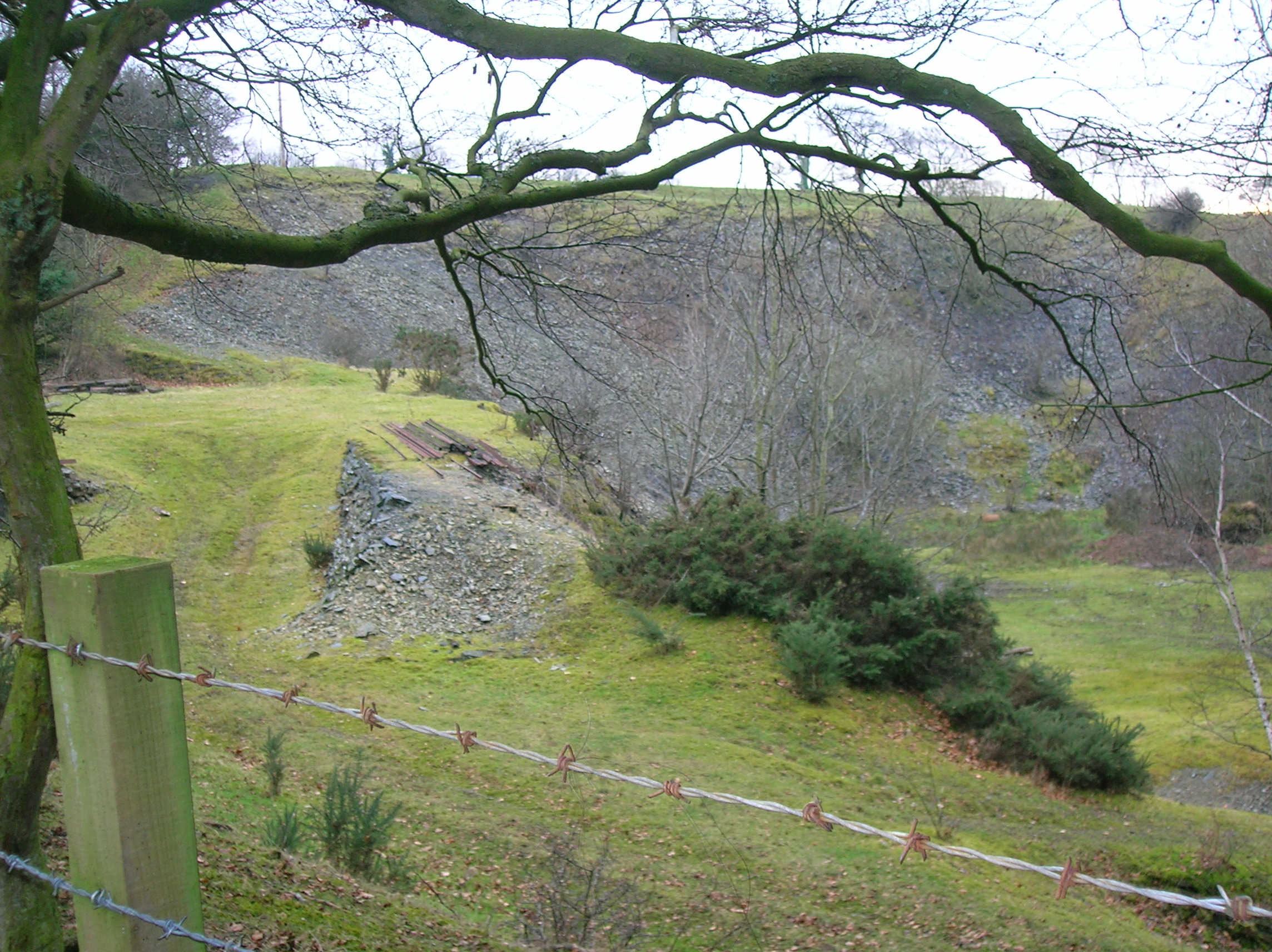
The Laigh Dalmore whetstone quarry

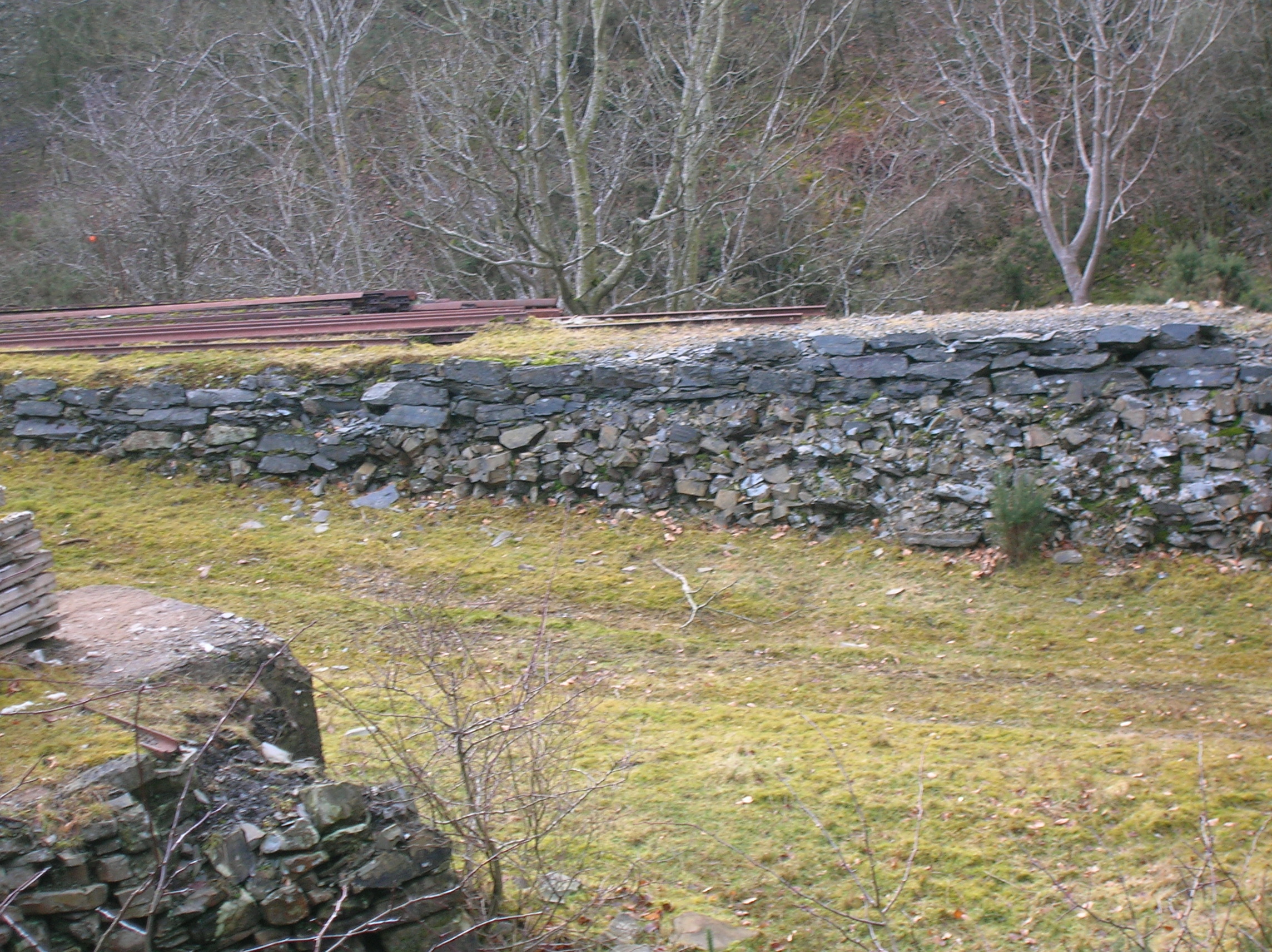
Quarry and embankment with old rails

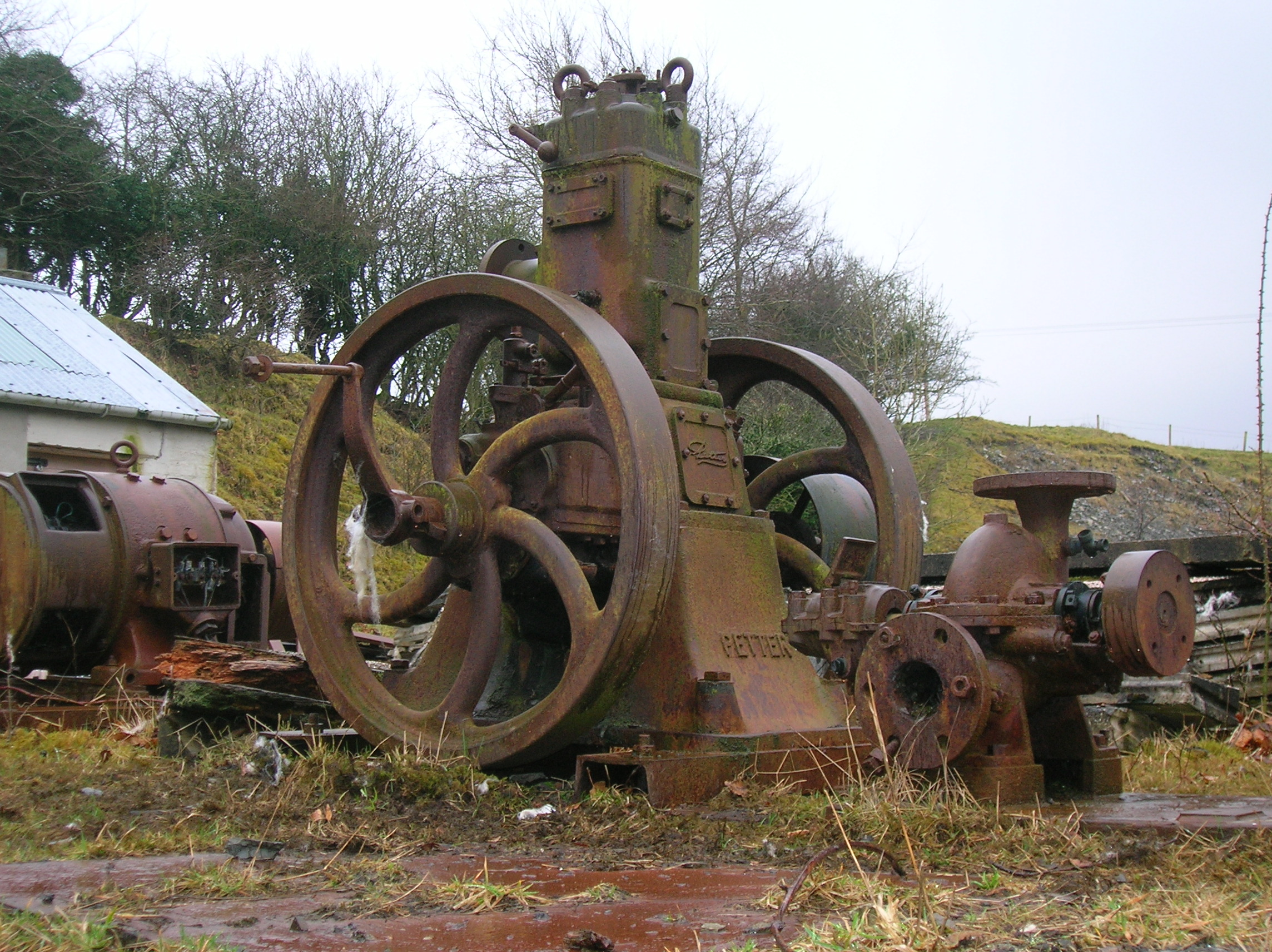
Petter hot-bulb engine at the quarry

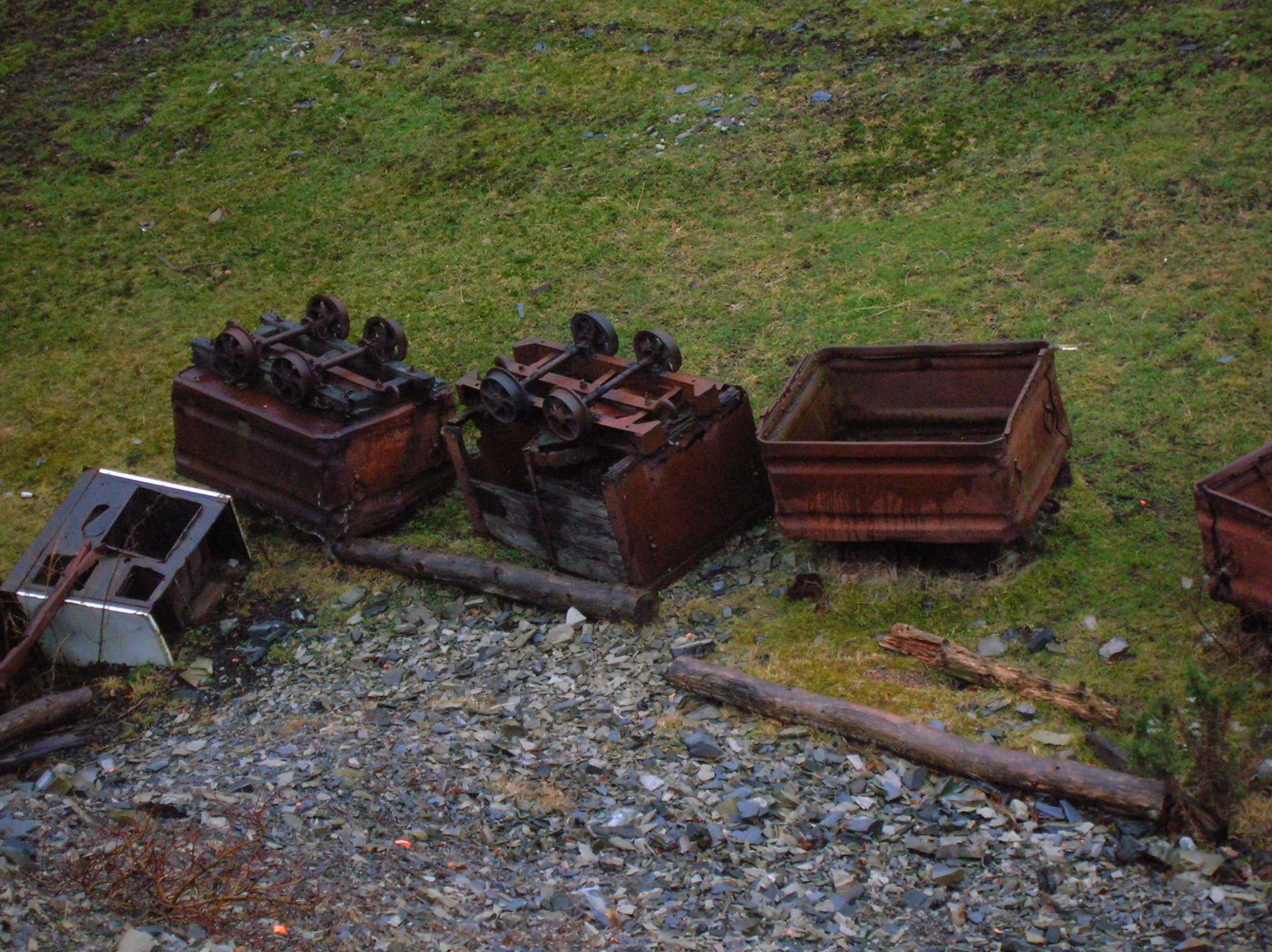
Old waggons in the quarry

== Micro-history ==
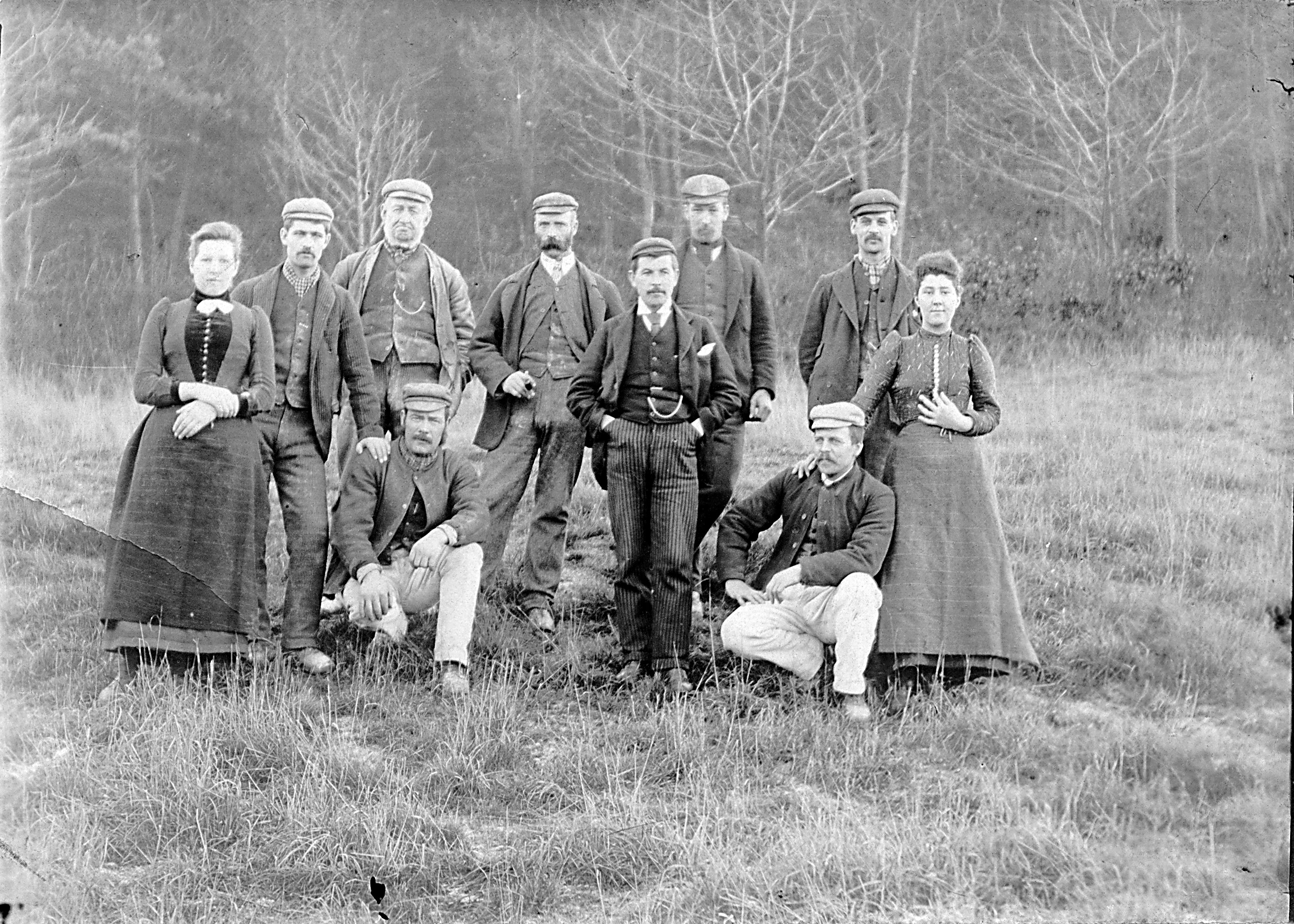
Probably the workforce of Dalmore Mill in the late 19th century

Gravestones to members of the Shearer (Scherar) family from the 20th century are present in Stair cemetery.

On 22 July 1928 a Conventicle was held at Dalgarnock near Closeburn in Dumfries and Galloway to unveil and dedicate a Northumbrian style 'Martyrs Cross', Mr John Cuninghame Montgomerie of Dalmore performing the official unveiling. A large number of people were in attendance as were a large united choir and the regimental band of the 7th Battalion of the Cameronian Territorial Regiment, commanded by Lieut. Colonel Vandaluer. A religious service was held and several clergy of other denominations also participated. A number of descendants of the Covenanter martyrs were present, including several of the Harkness family. The reason for John Cuninghame Montgomerie being given the honour of unveiling the cross has yet to be ascertained.

In 1883 Mrs Dunn of Dalmore presented Stair Church with two brass pulpit lamps which are still in perfect condition; later Mr Montgomerie gave two silver salvers to the church.

A number of groups of grind stones and unfinished hone stones were used as garden features around the old house. Old milestones were used to help protect the bridge piers from the scouring action of the river and these can still be seen at times of low water.

David Wyper is on the 'Stair Role of Honour', having worked at the hone mill until he was old enough to joy the army in 1917. David was killed in 1918 at the battle of Flanders Field.

The hamlet of Stair lies next to the River Ayr and consists of the Stair Inn, old converted mills, Stair Church, and Stair House.

Stair House, a late 16th-/17th-century house beyond the church, was the birthplace of John Dalrymple, 1st Earl of Stair. A category A listed building, it is still in use as a private dwelling.

The name Stair, previously written 'Stahar' or 'Stayhar', may come from the Gaelic 'Stair', meaning stepping-stones or a path over a bog.

In the 18th century, William Cunninghame of Enterkine held a Fête champêtre below the house on the holm pictured in the view from the Dalmore House tower. Robert Burns recorded the event in one of his songs; William was apparently trying to impress the local landowners to increase his chances of being elected as MP for Ayrshire.

Laigh Dalmore was home to Jeanie Shaw's uncle. A noted centenarian, Jeanie married John Gibson at the farm. Jeanie had eleven children and had 207 lineal descendants at the time of her death.

In 1982 the works still employed 10 people.

According to Mr K.B.C. Montgomery, the owner and last manager of the hone stone mine, interviewed at the site on 16 October 2010, the extant mine tubs in Dalmore Quarry were brought there a few years ago by the BBC for a television documentary about coal-mining during the nineteenth century. The wagons used in the hone stone mine were smaller and of a different type. For the documentary the broken waste stone dumped over the sides of the quarry was sprayed with black paint so that it looked like a huge stack of coal in the film. At the date of the interview there was a length of the stone mine track in situ beneath the grass leading from close to the mine shaft to the edge of the quarry, still present in 2010.

== Views of Dalmore and the Ayr Valley ==
The views of the River Ayr Valley were taken from the tower of Dalmore House.

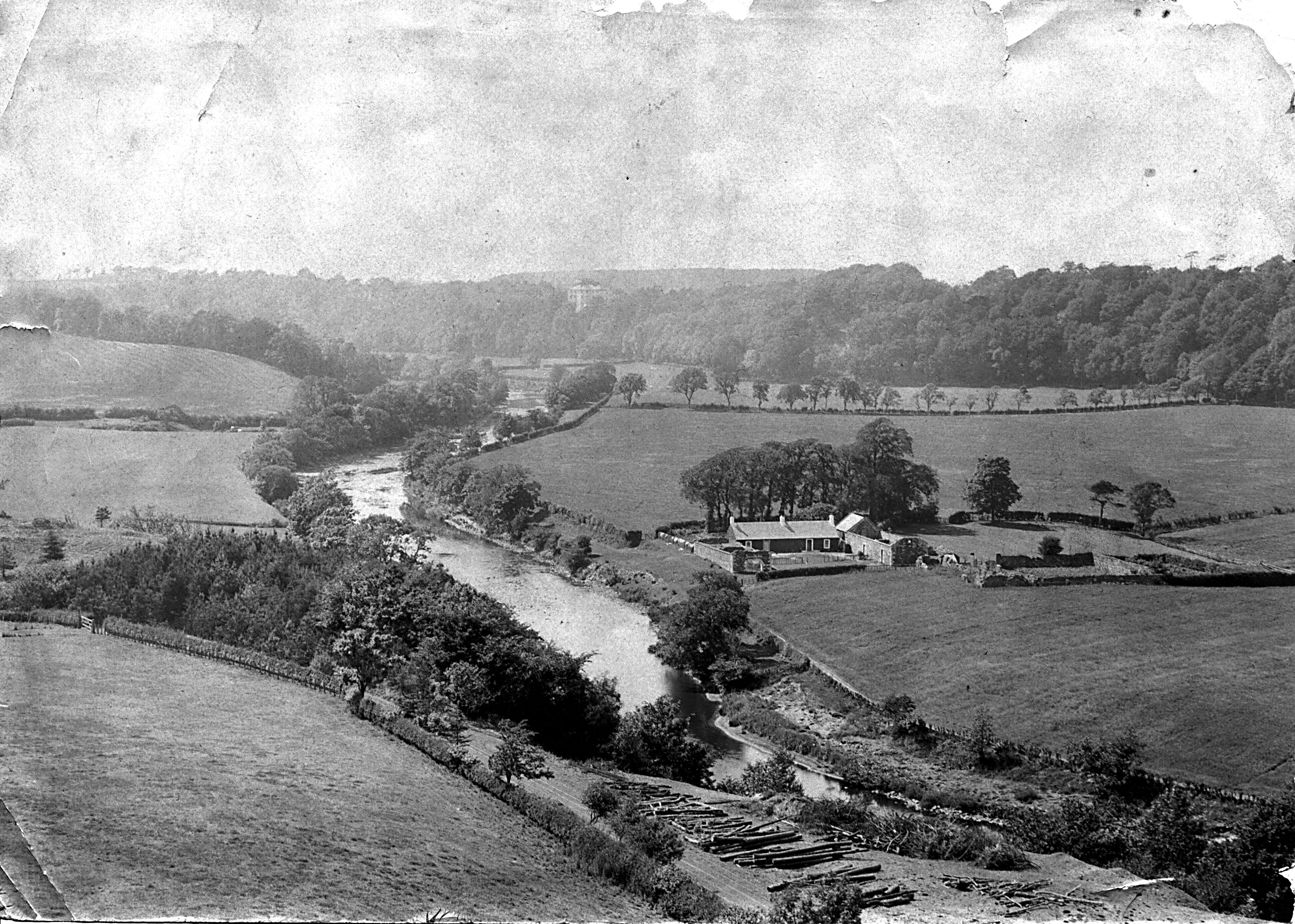
Enterkineholm Farm in the foreground and Enterkine House in the distance; Sawmill in the middle ground

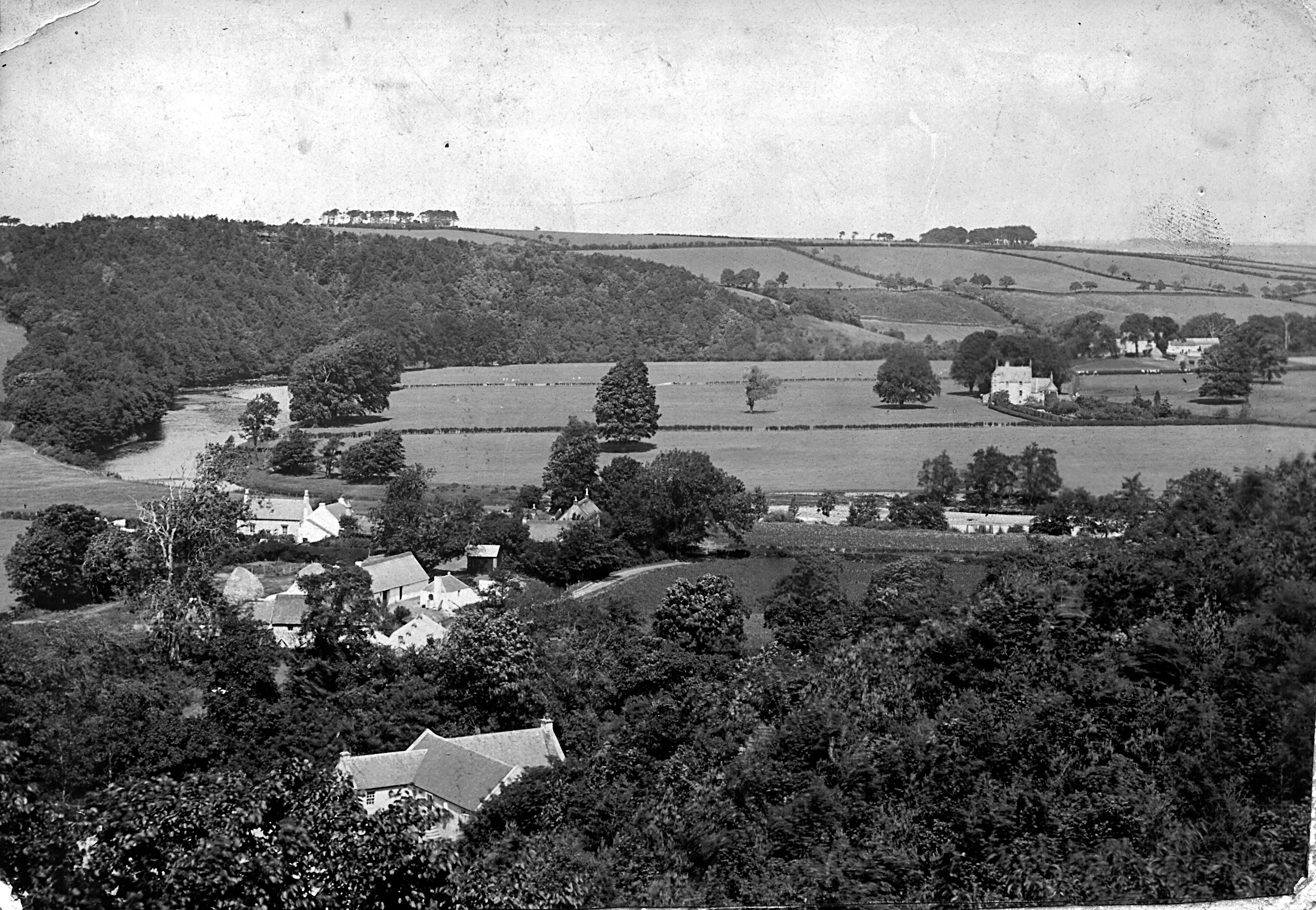
Stair House and village, with Dalmore Mill in the foreground

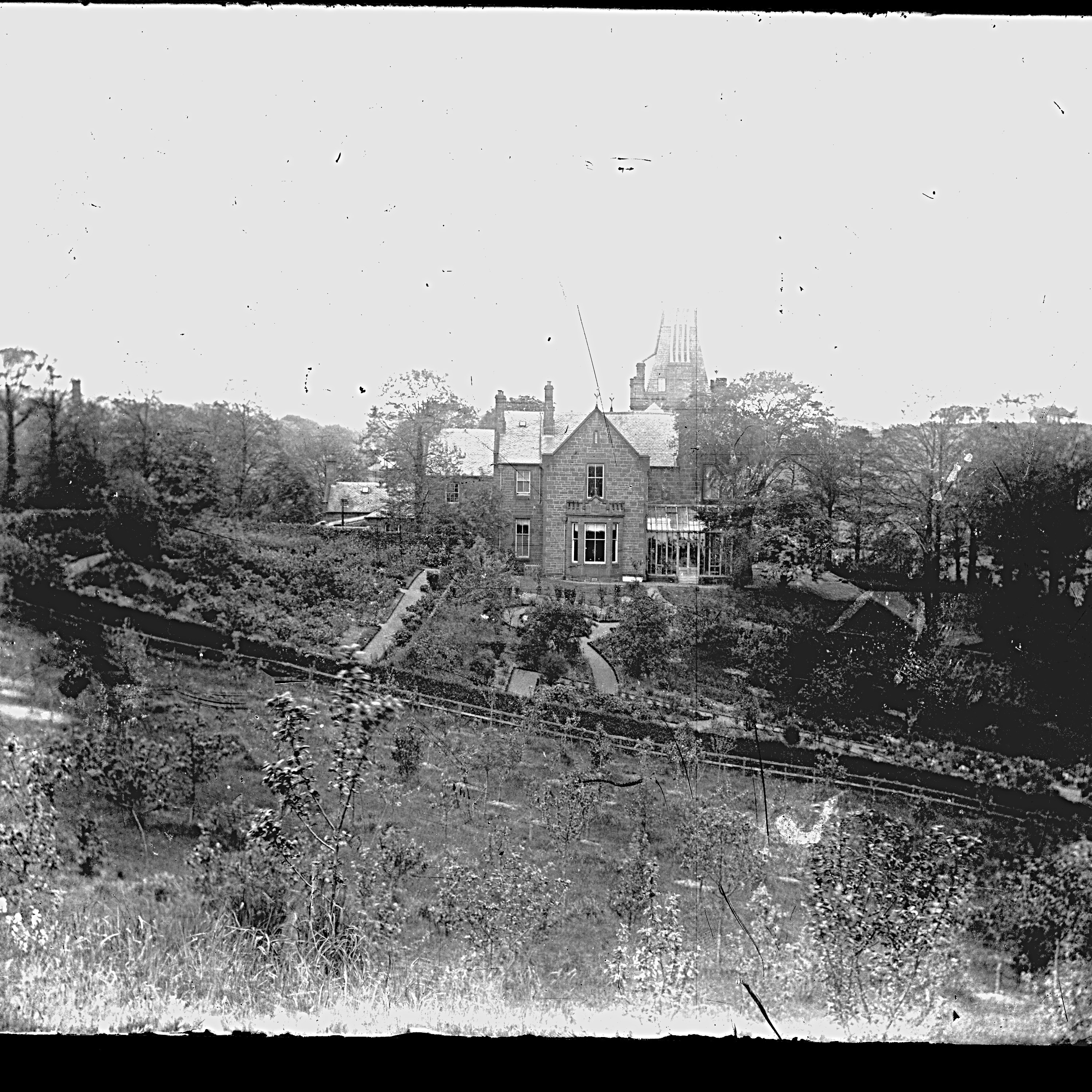
Dalmore House in the 19th century from the doocot

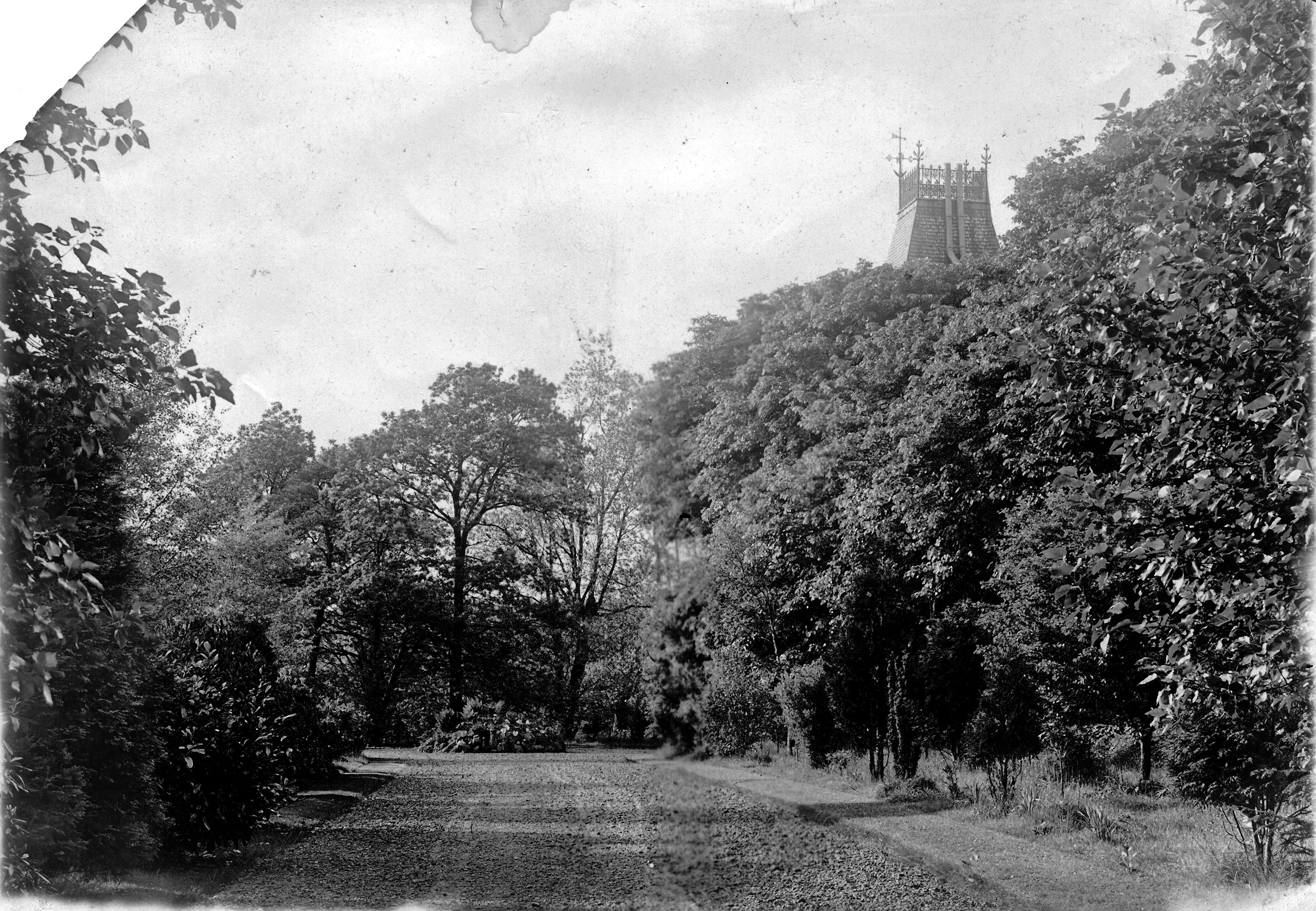
The driveway
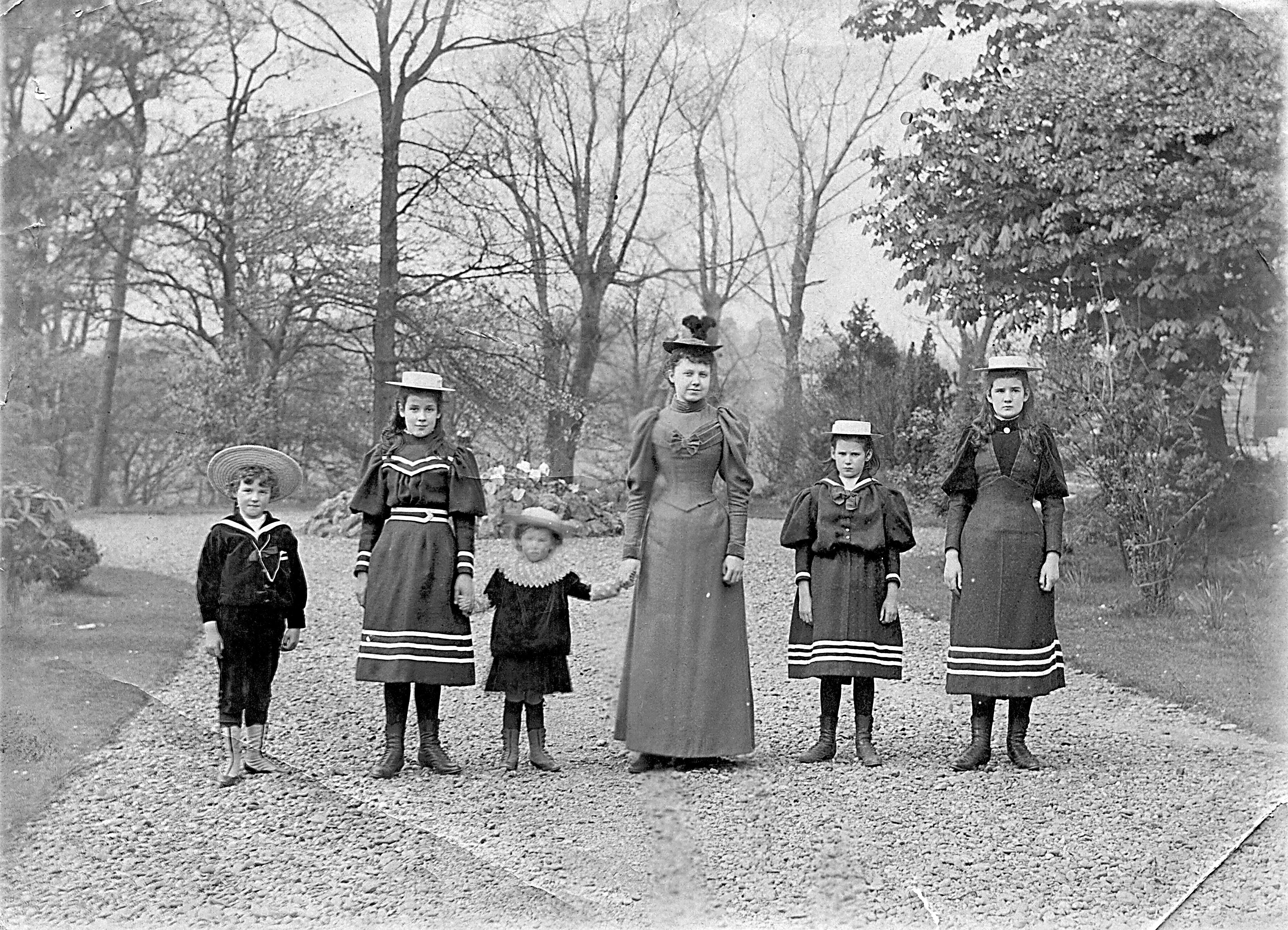
Dalmore House drive and a Montgomerie family portrait

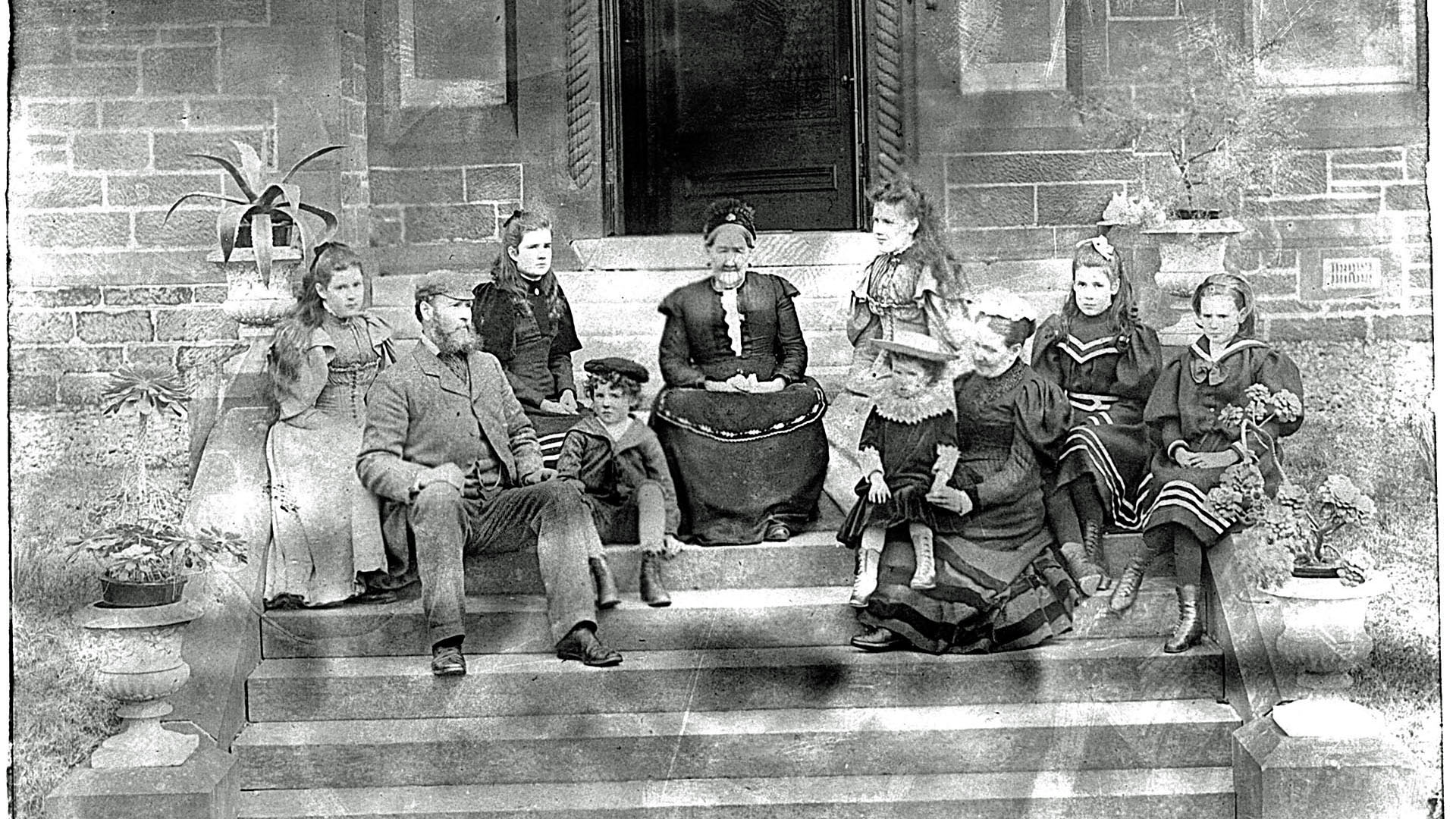
The Montgomerie family at Dalmore's front door

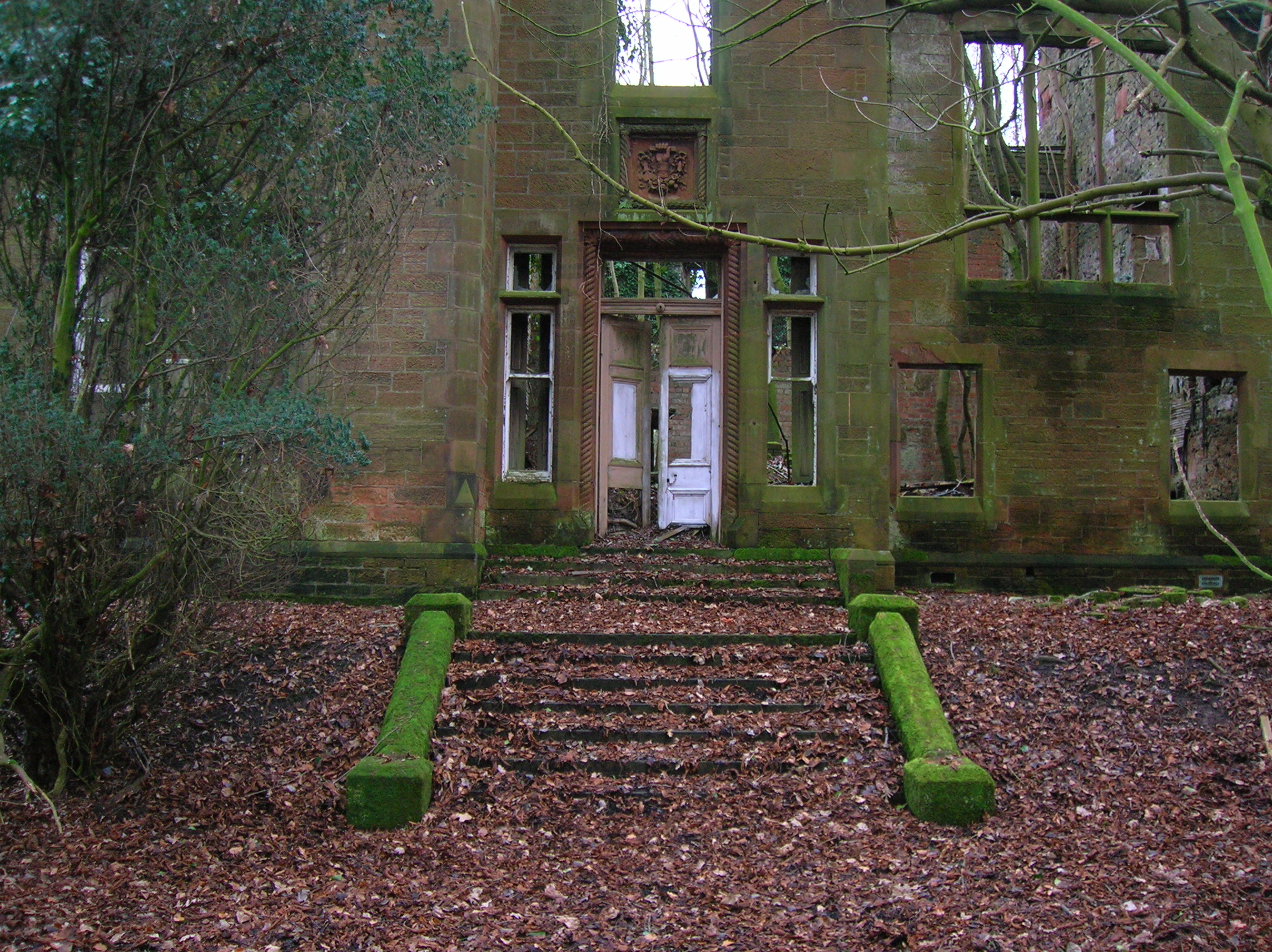
The same view in 2010

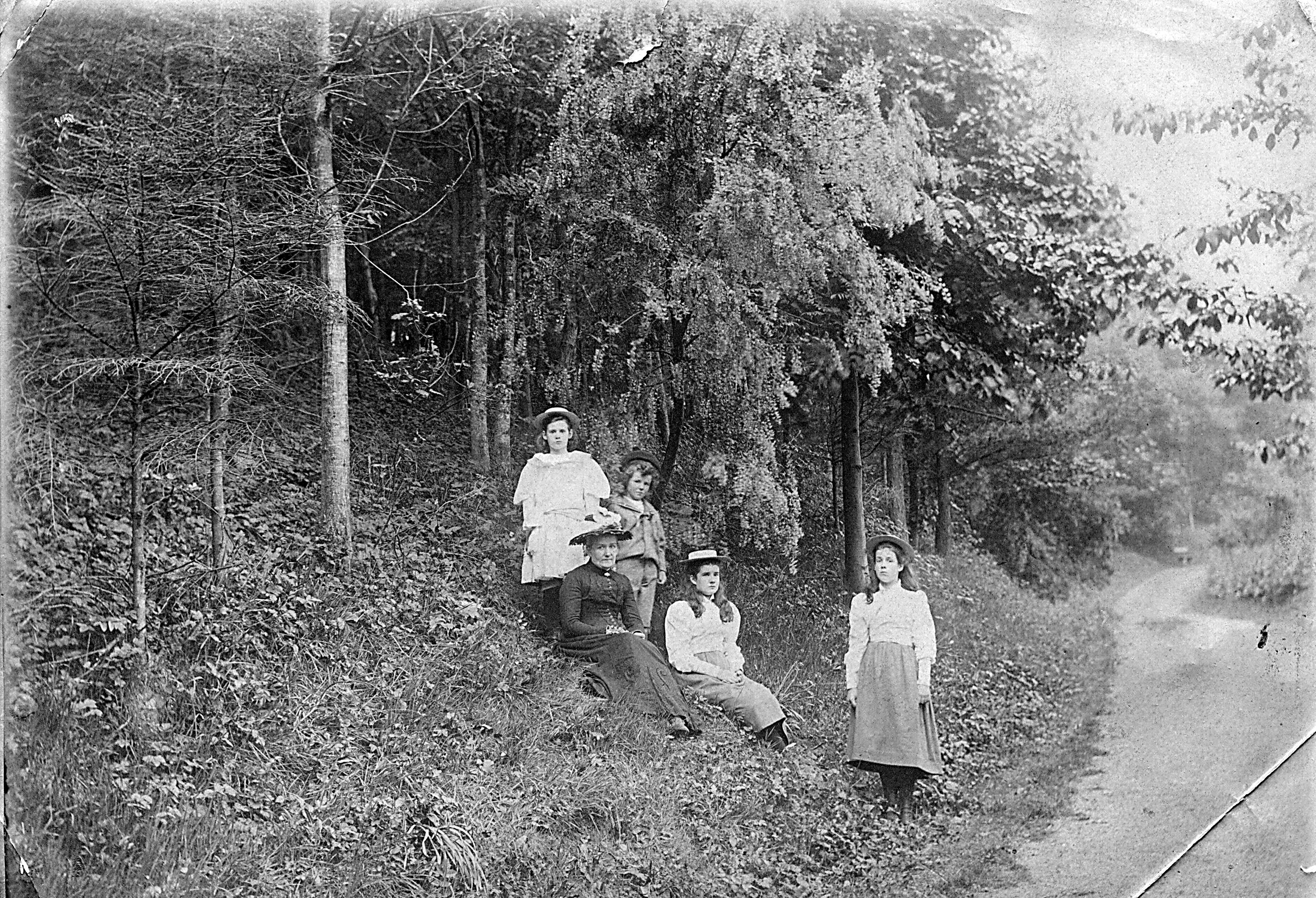
Members of the Montgomerie family under a flowering Laburnum tree within the Dalmore House gardens

Following the disastrous fire, the house and gardens were abandoned and left to nature. In 2010 it was in relatively good overall structural condition with part of the attached outbuildings still roofed.

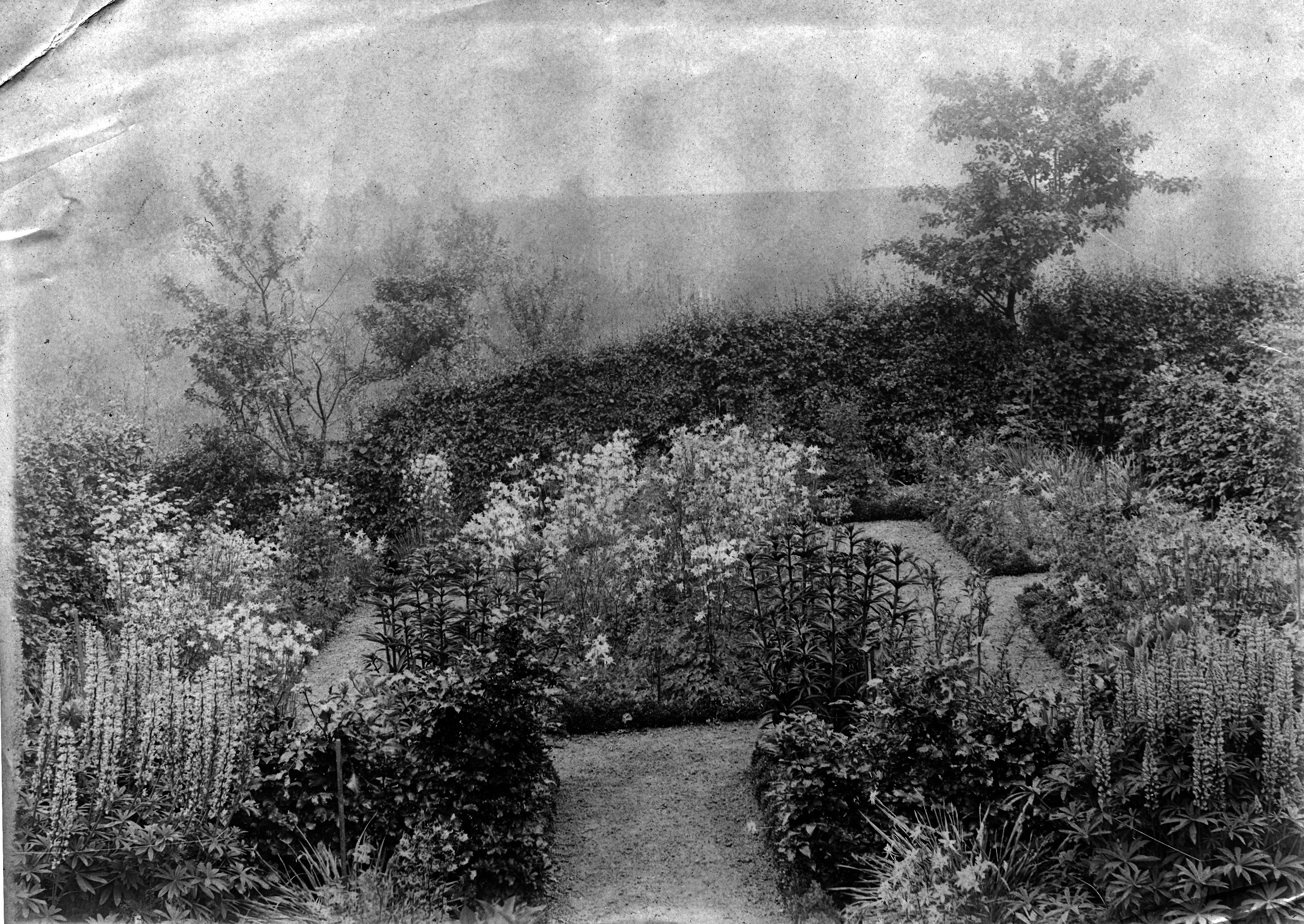
A part of the Dalmore Gardens

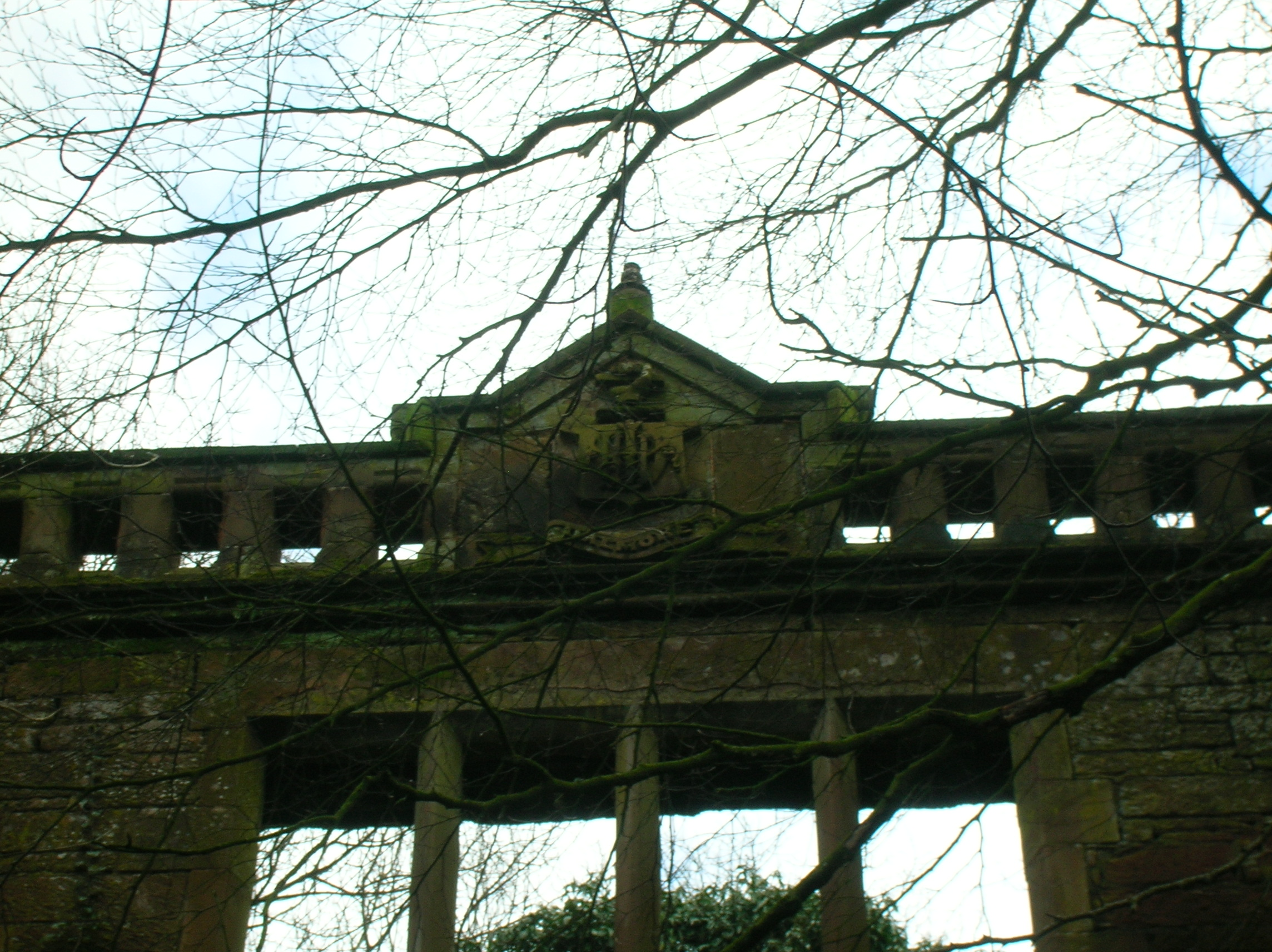
Monogram and Dalmore

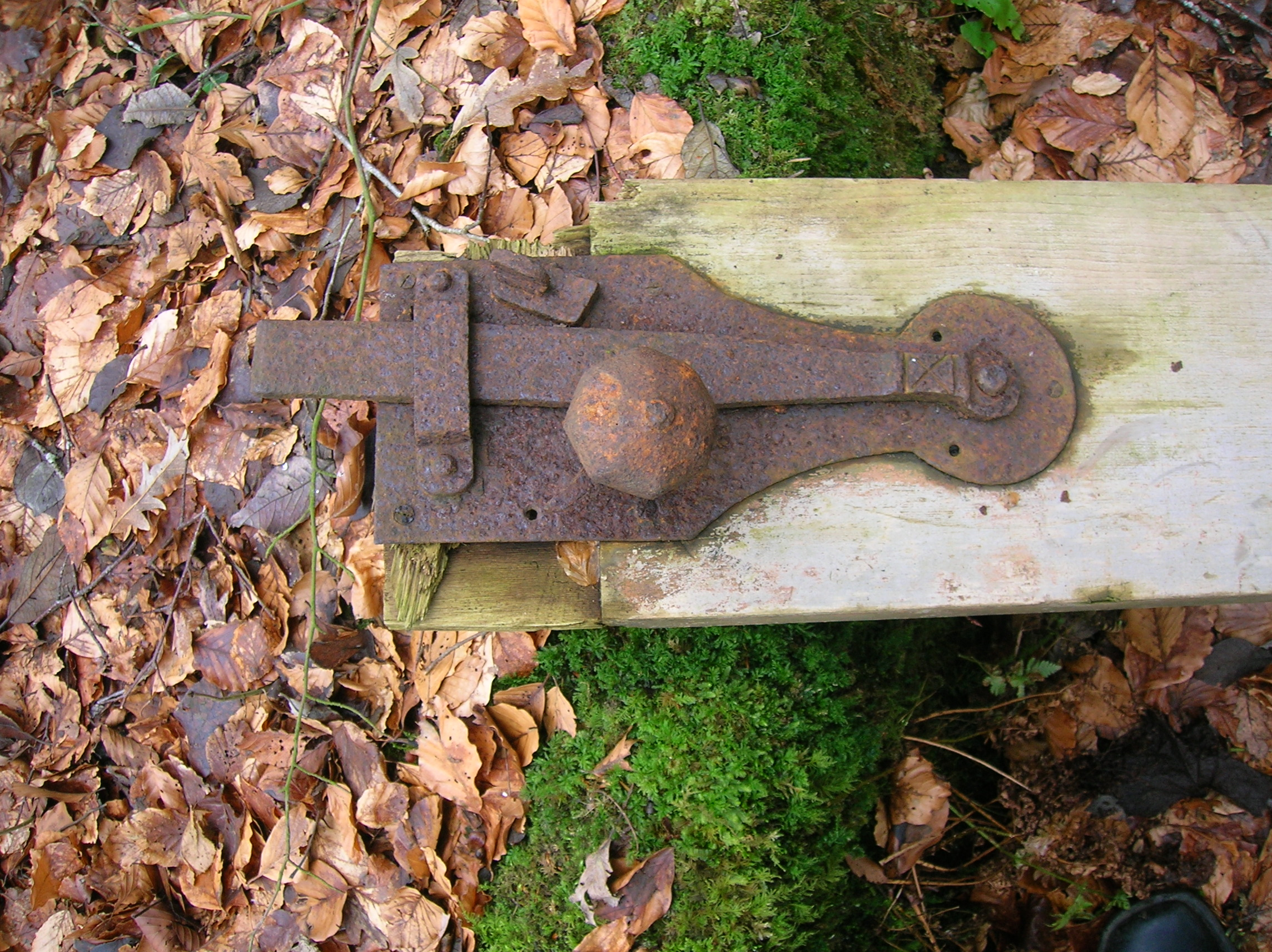
An old door lock

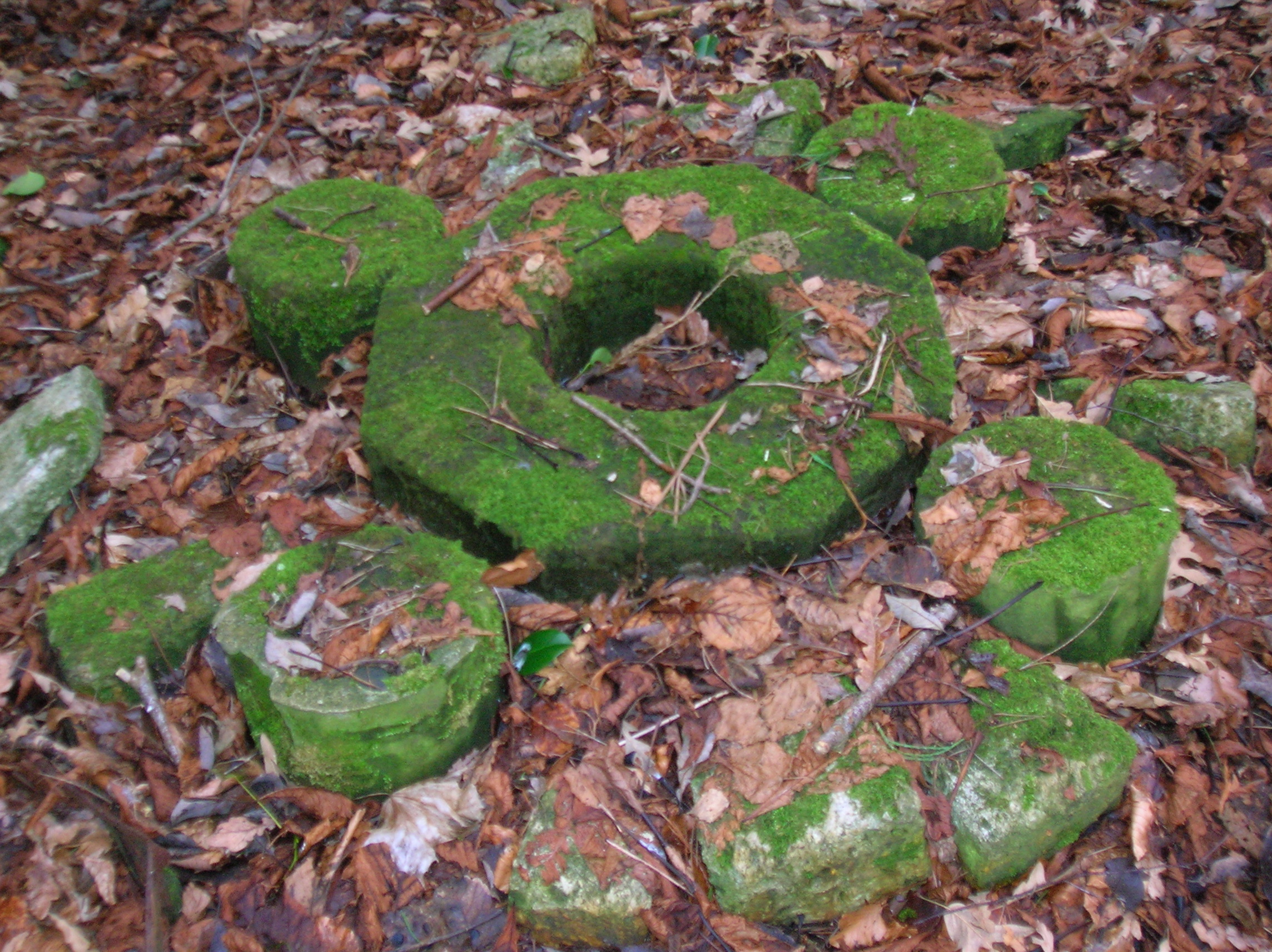
An old composite grindstone from the flour mill with unfinished hone stones
